= 2026 Carlos Alcaraz tennis season =

Tennis player season

- Alcaraz at the 2026 US Open
- Full name: Carlos Alcaraz Garfia
- Country: Spain
- Calendar prize money: $7,318,342

Singles
- Season record: 47–5 (90.4%)
- Calendar titles: 6
- Current ranking: No. 3
- Ranking change from previous year: ▼2

Grand Slam & significant results
- Australian Open: W
- French Open: A
- Wimbledon: A
- US Open: QF
- Other tournaments

Doubles
- Season record: 1–0 (100%)
- Current ranking: no ranking
- Ranking change from previous year: Steady

Mixed doubles
- Season record: 1–1 (50.0%)

Injuries
- Injuries: Injury to right wrist (April 15)
- Last updated on: 23 November 2026.

The 2026 Carlos Alcaraz tennis season officially began on 18 January 2026, with the start of the Australian Open in Melbourne.

During this season, Alcaraz:

- Became the youngest man in the Open Era to reach the final of all four majors
- Won his first title at the Australian Open, and seventh major title overall
- Became the youngest man in history to achieve the Career Grand Slam
- Held the world No. 1 ranking for a career total of 66 weeks.

== Yearly summary ==
=== Early hard court season ===
During the December preseason, Alcaraz parted ways with longtime coach Juan Carlos Ferrero.

==== Australian Open ====
Alcaraz began his 2026 season at the Australian Open. He reached the semifinals without dropping a single set. In the semifinal against Alexander Zverev, he won the first two sets before struggling due to cramps. After dropping the third and fourth sets in a pair of tiebreaks, he resurged to win the decider. At 5 hours and 27 minutes, this was the longest Australian Open semifinal and third-longest overall match in tournament history. Alcaraz became the youngest man in the Open Era to reach the final of all four majors, breaking the record set by Jim Courier in 1993. Alcaraz defeated Novak Djokovic in the final to clinch his first Australian Open title, becoming the youngest man in history to complete a Career Grand Slam at 22 years, 272 days old. He also became the youngest man in the Open Era to win seven major singles titles.

Alcaraz then withdrew from the Rotterdam Open, where he was defending champion, citing tiredness.

==== Qatar Open ====
Alcaraz resumed his season at the Qatar Open. He dropped just one set, to Karen Khachanov in the quarterfinal, on his way to the final. In the final, he defeated Arthur Fils in 50 minutes, the fastest completed match of his career to date, to claim his second title of the year.

=== Sunshine Double tournaments ===
==== Indian Wells ====
Alcaraz then returned to Indian Wells. With his quarterfinal victory against Cameron Norrie, he became the third and youngest man to reach five consecutive Indian Wells semifinals after Rafael Nadal and Novak Djokovic. This was also Alcaraz's 34th consecutive win on outdoor hardcourt – the third longest-such streak in the Open Era, tied with Pete Sampras, behind Roger Federer (46) and Jimmy Connors (55) respectively. In the semifinal, he met Daniil Medvedev for a rematch of the 2023 and 2024 finals. Despite being the heavy favorite, Alcaraz lost in straight sets.

==== Miami Open ====
At the Miami Open, Alcaraz defeated João Fonseca in their first career meeting before being upset by Sebastian Korda in the third round.

=== Clay season ===
==== Monte Carlo Masters ====
Alcaraz dropped just one set, to Tomás Martín Etcheverry, on the way to the final of the Monte Carlo Masters. He lost the match and the world No. 1 ranking to rival Jannik Sinner in their only match of the season.

==== Barcelona Open ====
A few days later, Alcaraz played his first match at the Barcelona Open. Towards the end of the first set he received a medical timeout to treat his forearm. While he won the match comfortably in straight sets, Alcaraz announced his withdrawal from the tournament soon afterwards, citing an unspecified wrist injury later identified as tenosynovitis.

=== Injury layoff ===
A few days after he withdrew from Barcelona, Alcaraz also withdrew from the Madrid Open to continue his recovery. At the end of April, Alcaraz announced his withdrawal from the Italian Open and the French Open, both tournaments where he was defending champion, ending his clay season. In May, he announced his withdrawal from the Queen's Club Championships, where he was defending champion, and Wimbledon, missing the entirety of the grass season. He did not enter the Canadian Open, and withdrew from the Cincinnati Open, where he was defending champion.

=== North American hard court swing ===
==== US Open ====
On August 20, Alcaraz announced he would return to competition at the US Open, where he was defending champion. During his injury layoff his ranking had dropped to world No. 3, but he entered the tournament as second seed due to Jannik Sinner's withdrawal. On August 22, the tournament confirmed longtime speculation that Alcaraz would also enter the mixed doubles draw partnered with Serena Williams. They defeated doubles specialists Erin Routliffe and Lloyd Glasspool, but lost in the second round.

Alcaraz played his first singles match in five months against Roman Safiullin and won in straight sets, although his average serve speed was noticeably reduced. He quickly shook off the rust and reached his fifth career quarterfinals at the US Open, losing one set on the way, to Jaime Faria. He extended his winning streak at the majors to a personal best 18 matches. Alcaraz then lost to Ben Shelton in the quarterfinals in a fifth set super tiebreak, with Shelton becoming the second player after Matteo Berrettini to defeat Alcaraz in five sets.

=== Asian hard court swing ===
==== Japan Open ====
After helping Team Europe win the Laver Cup, Alcaraz returned to the Japan Open. Still working on recovering his serve, he dropped two sets and was taken to four tiebreaks across the tournament, all of which he won. He defeated Jiří Lehečka in straight sets to defend his title. He became the first man to retain the title since Pete Sampras in 1994 and the third to do so, after Sampras and Stefan Edberg. He finished the tournament with a 10–0 career record in Tokyo. It was his tenth ATP 500 title, making him the fourth man to reach that total, after Roger Federer, Rafael Nadal and Novak Djokovic.

Vienna Open

Following a second round loss to Zizou Bergs in the Shanghai Open, Alcaraz surged through the Vienna draw. He defeated Karen Khachanov in 2 sets with a tie break decider. Facing seventh seed Tommy Paul in the Quarter Finals, he made it through in 2 sets with a tie break in the second. Alcaraz avenged his Indian Wells loss against Daniil Medvedev in the Semi Final with another 2 set victory. Reaching the final against Australian Alex de Minaur, who had beaten first seed Alexander Zverev in the Semis, Alcaraz won the title in a 2 set victory 6–1, 6–4. Alcaraz did not drop a set throughout the tournament and faced a tiebreak in every round except the final, winning them all.

== All matches ==
This table chronicles all the matches of Carlos Alcaraz in 2026.

Key
W	F	SF	QF	#R	RR	Q#	P#	DNQ	A	Z#	PO	G	S	B	NMS	NTI	P	NH

(W) winner; (F) finalist; (SF) semifinalist; (QF) quarterfinalist; (#R) rounds 4, 3, 2, 1; (RR) round-robin stage; (Q#) qualification round; (P#) preliminary round; (DNQ) did not qualify; (A) absent; (Z#) Davis/Fed Cup Zonal Group (with number indication) or (PO) play-off; (G) gold, (S) silver or (B) bronze Olympic/Paralympic medal; (NMS) not a Masters tournament; (NTI) not a Tier I tournament; (P) postponed; (NH) not held; (SR) strike rate (events won / competed); (W–L) win–loss record.
To avoid confusion and double counting, these charts are updated at the conclusion of a tournament or when the player's participation has ended.

=== Singles matches ===
Tournament	Match	W–L	Round	Opponent	Rank	Result	Score
Australian Open; Melbourne, Australia; Grand Slam; Hard, outdoor; Jan 18, 2026 – Feb 1, 2026	1 / 346	281 – 65	1R	(Australia) Adam Walton	81	Win	6–3, 7–6^{(7–2)}, 6–2
Australian Open; Melbourne, Australia; Grand Slam; Hard, outdoor; Jan 18, 2026 – Feb 1, 2026	2 / 347	282 – 65	2R	(Germany) Yannick Hanfmann	102	Win	7–6^{(7–4)}, 6–3, 6–2
Australian Open; Melbourne, Australia; Grand Slam; Hard, outdoor; Jan 18, 2026 – Feb 1, 2026	3 / 348	283 – 65	3R	(France) Corentin Moutet (32)	37	Win	6–2, 6–4, 6–1
Australian Open; Melbourne, Australia; Grand Slam; Hard, outdoor; Jan 18, 2026 – Feb 1, 2026	4 / 349	284 – 65	4R	(United States) Tommy Paul (19)	20	Win	7–6^{(8–6)}, 6–4, 7–5
Australian Open; Melbourne, Australia; Grand Slam; Hard, outdoor; Jan 18, 2026 – Feb 1, 2026	5 / 350	285 – 65	QF	(Australia) Alex de Minaur (6)	6	Win	7–5, 6–2, 6–1
Australian Open; Melbourne, Australia; Grand Slam; Hard, outdoor; Jan 18, 2026 – Feb 1, 2026	6 / 351	286 – 65	SF	(Germany) Alexander Zverev (3)	3	Win	6–4, 7–6^{(7–5)}, 6–7^{(3–7)}, 6–7^{(4–7)}, 7–5
Australian Open; Melbourne, Australia; Grand Slam; Hard, outdoor; Jan 18, 2026 – Feb 1, 2026	7 / 352	287 – 65	W	(Serbia) Novak Djokovic (4)	4	Win (1)	2–6, 6–2, 6–3, 7–5
Rotterdam Open; Rotterdam, Netherlands; ATP 500; Hard, indoor; Feb 9, 2026 – Feb 15, 2026	Withdrew						
Qatar Open; Dubai, United Arab Emirates; ATP 500; Hard, outdoor; February 16, 2026 – February 21, 2026	8 / 353	288 – 65	1R	(France) Arthur Rinderknech	30	Win	6–4, 7–6^{(7–5)}
Qatar Open; Dubai, United Arab Emirates; ATP 500; Hard, outdoor; February 16, 2026 – February 21, 2026	9 / 354	289 – 65	2R	(France) Valentin Royer	56	Win	6–2, 7–5
Qatar Open; Dubai, United Arab Emirates; ATP 500; Hard, outdoor; February 16, 2026 – February 21, 2026	10 / 355	290 – 65	QF	(Note: Russian and Belarus players are not allowed to compete under the name or flag of their country following the Russian invasion of Ukraine.) Karen Khachanov (7)	18	Win	6–7^{(3–7)}, 6–4, 6–3
Qatar Open; Dubai, United Arab Emirates; ATP 500; Hard, outdoor; February 16, 2026 – February 21, 2026	11 / 356	291 – 65	SF	Andrey Rublev (5)	14	Win	7–6^{(7–3)}, 6–4
Qatar Open; Dubai, United Arab Emirates; ATP 500; Hard, outdoor; February 16, 2026 – February 21, 2026	12 / 357	292 – 65	W	(France) Arthur Fils	40	Win (2)	6–2, 6–1
Indian Wells Open; Indian Wells, United States; ATP 1000; Hard, outdoor; March 4, 2026 – March 15, 2026	–	–	1R	Bye			
Indian Wells Open; Indian Wells, United States; ATP 1000; Hard, outdoor; March 4, 2026 – March 15, 2026	13 / 358	293 – 65	2R	(Bulgaria) Grigor Dimitrov	42	Win	6–2, 6–3
Indian Wells Open; Indian Wells, United States; ATP 1000; Hard, outdoor; March 4, 2026 – March 15, 2026	14 / 359	294 – 65	3R	(France) Arthur Rinderknech (26)	28	Win	6–7^{(6–8)}, 6–3, 6–2
Indian Wells Open; Indian Wells, United States; ATP 1000; Hard, outdoor; March 4, 2026 – March 15, 2026	15 / 360	295 – 65	4R	(Norway) Casper Ruud (13)	13	Win	6–1, 7–6^{(7–2)}
Indian Wells Open; Indian Wells, United States; ATP 1000; Hard, outdoor; March 4, 2026 – March 15, 2026	16 / 361	296 – 65	QF	(United Kingdom) Cameron Norrie (27)	29	Win	6–3, 6–4
Indian Wells Open; Indian Wells, United States; ATP 1000; Hard, outdoor; March 4, 2026 – March 15, 2026	17 / 362	296 – 66	SF	Daniil Medvedev (11)	11	Loss	3–6, 6–7^{(3–7)}
Miami Open; Miami, United States; ATP 1000; Hard, outdoor; Mar 17, 2026 - Mar 29, 2026	–	–	1R	Bye			
Miami Open; Miami, United States; ATP 1000; Hard, outdoor; Mar 17, 2026 - Mar 29, 2026	18 / 363	297 – 66	2R	(Brazil) João Fonseca	39	Win	6–4, 6–4
Miami Open; Miami, United States; ATP 1000; Hard, outdoor; Mar 17, 2026 - Mar 29, 2026	19 / 364	297 – 67	3R	(United States) Sebastian Korda (32)	36	Loss	3–6, 7–5, 4–6
Monte-Carlo Masters; Roquebrune-Cap-Martin, France; ATP 1000; Clay, outdoor; Apr 5, 2026 - Apr 12, 2026	–	–	1R	Bye			
Monte-Carlo Masters; Roquebrune-Cap-Martin, France; ATP 1000; Clay, outdoor; Apr 5, 2026 - Apr 12, 2026	20 / 365	298 – 67	2R	(Argentina) Sebastián Báez	65	Win	6–1, 6–3
Monte-Carlo Masters; Roquebrune-Cap-Martin, France; ATP 1000; Clay, outdoor; Apr 5, 2026 - Apr 12, 2026	21 / 366	299 – 67	3R	(Argentina) Tomás Martín Etcheverry	30	Win	6–1, 4–6, 6–3
Monte-Carlo Masters; Roquebrune-Cap-Martin, France; ATP 1000; Clay, outdoor; Apr 5, 2026 - Apr 12, 2026	22 / 367	300 – 67	QF	(Kazakhstan) Alexander Bublik (8)	11	Win	6–3, 6–0
Monte-Carlo Masters; Roquebrune-Cap-Martin, France; ATP 1000; Clay, outdoor; Apr 5, 2026 - Apr 12, 2026	23 / 368	301 – 67	SF	(Monaco) Valentin Vacherot (32)	23	Win	6–4, 6–4
Monte-Carlo Masters; Roquebrune-Cap-Martin, France; ATP 1000; Clay, outdoor; Apr 5, 2026 - Apr 12, 2026	24 / 369	301 – 68	F	(Italy) Jannik Sinner (2)	2	Loss	6–7^{(5–7)}, 3–6
Barcelona Open; Barcelona, Spain; ATP 500; Clay, outdoor; Apr 13, 2026 – Apr 19, 2026	25 / 370	302 – 68	1R	(Finland) Otto Virtanen	130	Win	6–4, 6–2
Barcelona Open; Barcelona, Spain; ATP 500; Clay, outdoor; Apr 13, 2026 – Apr 19, 2026	–	–	2R	(Czech Republic) Tomáš Macháč	47	Walkover	—N/a
Madrid Open; Madrid, Spain; ATP 1000; Clay, outdoor; Apr 23, 2026 – May 3, 2026	Withdrew						
Italian Open; Rome, Italy; ATP 1000; Clay, outdoor; May 5, 2026 – May 17, 2026	Withdrew						
French Open; Paris, France; Grand Slam; Clay, outdoor; May 24, 2026 – Jun 7, 2026	Withdrew						
Wimbledon Championships; London, United Kingdom; Grand Slam; Grass, outdoor; Jun 29, 2026 – Jul 12, 2026	Withdrew						
Canadian Open; Montreal, Canada; ATP 1000; Hard, outdoor; Aug 2, 2026 – Aug 13, 2026	Withdrew						
Cincinnati Open; Cincinnati, United States; ATP 1000; Hard, outdoor; Aug 13, 2026 – Aug 23, 2026	Withdrew						
US Open; New York, United States; Grand Slam; Hard, outdoor; Aug 30, 2026 – Sep 13, 2026	26 / 371	303 – 68	1R	Roman Safiullin	99	Win	6–4, 6–4, 6–4
US Open; New York, United States; Grand Slam; Hard, outdoor; Aug 30, 2026 – Sep 13, 2026	27 / 372	304 – 68	2R	(Portugal) Jaime Faria	72	Win	4–6, 6–0, 6–3, 6–2
US Open; New York, United States; Grand Slam; Hard, outdoor; Aug 30, 2026 – Sep 13, 2026	28 / 373	305 – 68	3R	(China) Wu Yibing	113	Win	6–3, 6–4, 6–1
US Open; New York, United States; Grand Slam; Hard, outdoor; Aug 30, 2026 – Sep 13, 2026	29 / 374	306 – 68	4R	(United States) Tommy Paul (20)	21	Win	6–4, 6–3, 6–4
US Open; New York, United States; Grand Slam; Hard, outdoor; Aug 30, 2026 – Sep 13, 2026	30 / 375	306 – 69	QF	(United States) Ben Shelton (8)	9	Loss	7–6^{(7–5)}, 1–6, 3–6, 6–1, 6–7^{(7–10)}
Laver Cup; London, Great Britain; Hard, indoor; Sep 25, 2026 – Sep 27, 2026	31 / 376	307 – 69	Day 2	(United States) Taylor Fritz	10	Win	6–3, 4–6, [13–11]
Laver Cup; London, Great Britain; Hard, indoor; Sep 25, 2026 – Sep 27, 2026	–	–	Day 3	(Australia) Alex de Minaur	9	—N/a	Not played
Japan Open; Tokyo, Japan; ATP 500; Hard, outdoor; Sep 30, 2026 – Oct 6, 2026	32 / 377	308 – 69	1R	(United States) Alex Michelsen	34	Win	7–6^{(7–1)}, 4–6, 6–1
Japan Open; Tokyo, Japan; ATP 500; Hard, outdoor; Sep 30, 2026 – Oct 6, 2026	33 / 378	309 – 69	2R	(Italy) Matteo Arnaldi	37	Win	7–6^{(8–6)}, 6–1
Japan Open; Tokyo, Japan; ATP 500; Hard, outdoor; Sep 30, 2026 – Oct 6, 2026	34 / 379	310 – 69	QF	(Canada) Denis Shapovalov	46	Win	7–6^{(7–3)}, 2–1 ret.
Japan Open; Tokyo, Japan; ATP 500; Hard, outdoor; Sep 30, 2026 – Oct 6, 2026	35 / 380	311 – 69	SF	(Spain) Jaume Munar (Q)	64	Win	5–7, 6–3, 6–1
Japan Open; Tokyo, Japan; ATP 500; Hard, outdoor; Sep 30, 2026 – Oct 6, 2026	36 / 381	312 – 69	W	(Czech Republic) Jiří Lehečka	23	Win (3)	7–6^{(7–4)}, 6–4
Shanghai Masters; Shanghai, China; ATP 1000; Hard, outdoor; Oct 7, 2026 – Oct 18, 2026	–	–	1R	Bye			
Shanghai Masters; Shanghai, China; ATP 1000; Hard, outdoor; Oct 7, 2026 – Oct 18, 2026	37 / 382	313 – 69	2R	(Argentina) Juan Manuel Cerúndolo	55	Win	6–3, 6–3
Shanghai Masters; Shanghai, China; ATP 1000; Hard, outdoor; Oct 7, 2026 – Oct 18, 2026	38 / 383	313 – 70	3R	(Belgium) Zizou Bergs	39	Loss	5–7, 6–7^{(4–7)}
Vienna Open; Vienna, Austria; ATP 500; Hard, indoor; Oct 26, 2026 – Nov 1, 2026	39 / 384	314 – 70	1R	Karen Khachanov	24	Win	6–4, 7–6^{(7–5)}
Vienna Open; Vienna, Austria; ATP 500; Hard, indoor; Oct 26, 2026 – Nov 1, 2026	40 / 385	315 – 70	2R	(Georgia (country)) Nikoloz Basilashvili	95	Win	6–1, 7–6^{(13–11)}
Vienna Open; Vienna, Austria; ATP 500; Hard, indoor; Oct 26, 2026 – Nov 1, 2026	41 / 386	316 – 70	QF	(United States) Tommy Paul (7)	14	Win	6–4, 7–6^{(7–2)}
Vienna Open; Vienna, Austria; ATP 500; Hard, indoor; Oct 26, 2026 – Nov 1, 2026	42 / 387	317 – 70	SF	Daniil Medvedev (3)	5	Win	6–4, 7–6^{(7–2)}
Vienna Open; Vienna, Austria; ATP 500; Hard, indoor; Oct 26, 2026 – Nov 1, 2026	43 / 388	318 – 70	W	(Australia) Alex de Minaur (5)	10	Win (4)	6–1, 6–4
Paris Masters; Paris, France; ATP 1000; Hard, indoor; Nov 2, 2026 – Nov 8, 2026	–	–	1R	Bye			
Paris Masters; Paris, France; ATP 1000; Hard, indoor; Nov 2, 2026 – Nov 8, 2026	44 / 389	319 – 70	2R	(United States) Alex Michelsen	35	Win	7–6^{(7–4)}, 6–3
Paris Masters; Paris, France; ATP 1000; Hard, indoor; Nov 2, 2026 – Nov 8, 2026	–	–	3R	(Italy) Matteo Berrettini	43	Walkover	—N/a
Paris Masters; Paris, France; ATP 1000; Hard, indoor; Nov 2, 2026 – Nov 8, 2026	45 / 390	320 – 70	QF	(United States) Taylor Fritz (11)	12	Win	6–7^{(10–12)}, 7–5, 6–3
Paris Masters; Paris, France; ATP 1000; Hard, indoor; Nov 2, 2026 – Nov 8, 2026	46 / 391	321 – 70	SF	(Norway) Casper Ruud	23	Win	6–4, 6–4
Paris Masters; Paris, France; ATP 1000; Hard, indoor; Nov 2, 2026 – Nov 8, 2026	47 / 392	322 – 70	W	(United States) Ben Shelton (3)	4	Win (5)	7–6^{(7–5)}, 7–5
ATP Finals; Turin, Italy; Tour Finals; Hard, indoor; Nov 15, 2026 – Nov 22, 2026	48 / 393	323 – 70	RR	(United States) Frances Tiafoe (7)	8	Win	6–2, 6–2
ATP Finals; Turin, Italy; Tour Finals; Hard, indoor; Nov 15, 2026 – Nov 22, 2026	49 / 394	324 – 70	RR	Daniil Medvedev (4)	5	Win	6–2, 6–4
ATP Finals; Turin, Italy; Tour Finals; Hard, indoor; Nov 15, 2026 – Nov 22, 2026	50 / 395	325 – 70	RR	(Italy) Flavio Cobolli (5)	6	Win	6–4, 6–1
ATP Finals; Turin, Italy; Tour Finals; Hard, indoor; Nov 15, 2026 – Nov 22, 2026	51 / 396	326 – 70	SF	(United States) Ben Shelton (3)	4	Win	3–6, 6–3, 7–6^{(7–1)}
ATP Finals; Turin, Italy; Tour Finals; Hard, indoor; Nov 15, 2026 – Nov 22, 2026	52 / 397	327 – 70	W	(Germany) Alexander Zverev (1)	1	Win (6)	6–2, 7–6^{(9–7)}
Source: Player activity

=== Doubles matches ===
Tournament	Match	Round	Opponents (seed or key)	Ranks	Result	Score
Laver Cup; London, Great Britain; Laver Cup; Hard, indoor 25 – 27 September 2026; Partner: (Czech Republic) Jakub Menšík
Laver Cup; London, Great Britain; Laver Cup; Hard, indoor 25 – 27 September 2026; Partner: (Czech Republic) Jakub Menšík	1 / 16	Day 1	(Kazakhstan) Alexander Bublik / (United States) Taylor Fritz	359 / –	Win	6–4, 6–4

=== Mixed doubles matches ===
Tournament	Match	Round	Opponents (seed or key)	Ranks	Result	Score
US Open; New York City, United States; Grand Slam tournament Hard, outdoor 24 August – 13 September 2026; Partner: (United States) Serena Williams
US Open; New York City, United States; Grand Slam tournament Hard, outdoor 24 August – 13 September 2026; Partner: (United States) Serena Williams	1 / 2	1R	(New Zealand) Erin Routliffe / (United Kingdom) Lloyd Glasspool (Q)	14 / 17	Win	5–3, 4–1
US Open; New York City, United States; Grand Slam tournament Hard, outdoor 24 August – 13 September 2026; Partner: (United States) Serena Williams	2 / 2	QF	(Switzerland) Belinda Bencic / (Italy) Flavio Cobolli (5)	1636 / 364	Loss	4–5^{(4–7)}, 1–4

== Exhibition matches ==
=== Singles ===
Tournament	Match	Round	Opponent (seed or key)	Rank	Result	Score
Hyundai Card Super Match; Seoul, South Korea Hard, outdoor 10 January 2026
Hyundai Card Super Match; Seoul, South Korea Hard, outdoor 10 January 2026	1	PO	(Italy) Jannik Sinner	2	Win	7–5, 7–6^{(8–6)}
Australian Open Opening Week; Melbourne, Australia Hard, outdoor 15 January 2026
Australian Open Opening Week; Melbourne, Australia Hard, outdoor 15 January 2026	2	PO	(Australia) Alex de Minaur	6	Win	6–3, 6–4

== Schedule ==
Per Carlos Alcaraz, this is his current 2026 schedule (subject to change).

=== Singles schedule ===
Date	Tournament	Location	Tier	Surface	Prev. result	Prev. points	New points	Result
18 January 2026– 1 February 2026	Australian Open	Melbourne, Australia	Grand Slam	Hard	QF	400	2000	Champion (defeated Novak Djokovic, 2–6, 6–2, 6–3, 7–5)
9 February 2026– 15 February 2026	Rotterdam Open	Rotterdam, Netherlands	ATP 500	Hard (i)	W	500	0	Withdrew
16 February 2026– 21 February 2026	Qatar Open	Doha, Qatar	ATP 500	Hard	QF	100	500	Champion (defeated Arthur Fils 6–2, 6–1)
4 March 2025– 15 March 2026	Indian Wells Open	Indian Wells, United States	ATP 1000	Hard	SF	400	400	Semifinals (lost to Daniil Medvedev, 3–6, 6–7^{(3–7)})
18 March 2026– 29 March 2026	Miami Open	Miami, United States	ATP 1000	Hard	2R	10	50	Third round (lost to Sebastian Korda, 3–6, 7–5, 4–6)
5 April 2026– 12 April 2026	Monte-Carlo Masters	Roquebrune-Cap-Martin, France	ATP 1000	Clay	W	1000	650	Final (lost to Jannik Sinner, 6–7^{(5–7)}, 3–6)
13 April 2026– 19 April 2026	Barcelona Open	Barcelona, Spain	ATP 500	Clay	F	330	50	Second round (withdrew)
22 April 2026– 3 May 2026	Madrid Open	Madrid, Spain	ATP 1000	Clay	A	0	0	Withdrew
6 May 2026– 17 May 2026	Italian Open	Rome, Italy	ATP 1000	Clay	W	1000	0	Withdrew
24 May 2026– 7 June 2026	French Open	Paris, France	Grand Slam	Clay	W	2000	0	Withdrew
15 June 2026– 21 June 2026	Queen's Club Championships	London, Great Britain	ATP 500	Grass	W	500	0	Withdrew
29 June 2026– 12 July 2026	Wimbledon	London, Great Britain	Grand Slam	Grass	F	1300	0	Withdrew
2 August 2026– 13 August 2026	Canadian Open	Montreal, Canada	ATP 1000	Hard	A	0	0	Withdrew
13 August 2026– 23 August 2026	Cincinnati Open	Cincinnati, United States	ATP 1000	Hard	W	1000	0	Withdrew
30 August 2026– 13 September 2026	US Open	New York City, United States	Grand Slam	Hard	W	2000	400	Quarterfinals (lost to Ben Shelton, 7–6^{(7–5)}, 1–6, 3–6, 6–1, 6–7^{(7–10)})
25 September 2026– 27 September 2026	Laver Cup	London, Great Britain	Laver Cup	Hard (i)	N/A	N/A	N/A	Team Europe defeated Team World, 13–5
30 September 2026– 6 October 2026	Japan Open	Tokyo, Japan	ATP 500	Hard	W	500	500	Champion (defeated Jiří Lehečka 7–6^{(7–4)}, 6–4)
7 October 2026– 18 October 2026	Shanghai Masters	Shanghai, China	ATP 1000	Hard	A	0	50	Third round (lost to Zizou Bergs, 5–7, 6–7^{(4–7)})
26 October 2026– 1 November 2026	Vienna Open	Vienna, Austria	ATP 500	Hard (i)	A	0	500	Champion (defeated Alex de Minaur 6–1, 6–4)
2 November 2026– 8 November 2026	Paris Masters	Paris, France	ATP 1000	Hard (i)	2R	10	1000	Champion (defeated Ben Shelton 7–6^{(7–5)}, 7–5)
15 November 2026– 22 November 2026	ATP Finals	Turin, Italy	Tour Finals	Hard (i)	F	1000	1500	Champion (defeated Alexander Zverev 6–2, 7–6^{(9–7)})
Total year-end points (as of ATP Finals)						12050	7600	
Total year-end points						12050	7600	▼4450 difference
Source: Rankings breakdown

== Yearly records ==
=== Head-to-head matchups ===
Carlos Alcaraz has a 47–5 (90.4%) ATP match win–loss record in the 2026 season. His record against players ranked in the ATP rankings Top 10 at the time of the meeting is 12–2 (85.7%). Bold indicates player was ranked top 10 at the time of at least one meeting. The following list is ordered by number of wins:

- (United States) Tommy Paul 3–0
- (United States) **Taylor Fritz** 2–0
- Karen Khachanov 2–0
- **Daniil Medvedev** 2–0
- (United States) Alex Michelsen 2–0
- (Australia) **Alex de Minaur** 2–0
- (France) Arthur Rinderknech 2–0
- (Norway) Casper Ruud 2–0
- (Germany) **Alexander Zverev** 2–0
- (United States) **Ben Shelton** 2–1
- (Italy) Matteo Arnaldi 1–0
- (Argentina) Sebastián Báez 1–0
- (Georgia (country)) Nikoloz Basilashvili 1–0
- (Kazakhstan) Alexander Bublik 1–0
- (Argentina) Juan Manuel Cerúndolo 1–0
- (Italy) **Flavio Cobolli** 1–0
- (Bulgaria) Grigor Dimitrov 1–0
- (Serbia) **Novak Djokovic** 1–0
- (Argentina) Tomás Martín Etcheverry 1–0
- (Portugal) Jaime Faria 1–0
- (France) Arthur Fils 1–0
- (Brazil) João Fonseca 1–0
- (Germany) Yannick Hanfmann 1–0
- (Czech Republic) Jiří Lehečka 1–0
- (France) Corentin Moutet 1–0
- (Spain) Jaume Munar 1–0
- (United Kingdom) Cameron Norrie 1–0
- (France) Valentin Royer 1–0
- Andrey Rublev 1–0
- Roman Safiullin 1–0
- (Canada) Denis Shapovalov 1–0
- (United States) **Frances Tiafoe** 1–0
- (Monaco) Valentin Vacherot 1–0
- (Finland) Otto Virtanen 1–0
- (Australia) Adam Walton 1–0
- (China) Wu Yibing 1–0
- (Belgium) Zizou Bergs 0–1
- (United States) Sebastian Korda 0–1
- Daniil Medvedev 0–1
- (Italy) **Jannik Sinner** 0–1

* Statistics correct as of 22 November 2026.

=== Top 10 record (12–2) ===
Category Grand Slam (3–1) ATP Finals (5–0) Laver Cup (1–0) Masters 1000 (1–1) 500 Series (2–0) 250 Series (0–0)	Wins by surface Hard (12–1) Clay (0–1) Grass (0–0)	Wins by setting Outdoor (3–2) Indoor (9–0)

Result	W–L	Player	Rk	Event	Surface	Rd	Score	Rk	Ref
Win	1–0	(Australia) Alex de Minaur	6	Australian Open, Australia	Hard	QF	7–5, 6–2, 6–1	**1**	
Win	2–0	(Germany) Alexander Zverev	3	Australian Open, Australia	Hard	SF	6–4, 7–6^{(7–5)}, 6–7^{(3–7)}, 6–7^{(4–7)}, 7–5	**1**	
Win	3–0	(Serbia) Novak Djokovic	4	Australian Open, Australia	Hard	F	2–6, 6–2, 6–3, 7–5	**1**	
Loss	3–1	(Italy) Jannik Sinner	2	Monte-Carlo Masters, France	Clay	F	6–7^{(5–7)}, 3–6	**1**	
Loss	3–2	(United States) Ben Shelton	9	US Open, United States	Hard	QF	7–6^{(7–5)}, 1–6, 3–6, 6–1, 6–7^{(7–10)}	3	
Win	4–2	(United States) Taylor Fritz	10	Laver Cup, United Kingdom	Hard (i)	RR	6–3, 4–6, [13–11]	3	
Win	5–2	Daniil Medvedev	5	Vienna Open, Austria	Hard (i)	SF	6–4, 7–6^{(7–2)}	3	
Win	6–2	(Australia) Alex de Minaur	10	Vienna Open, Austria	Hard (i)	F	6–1, 6–4	3	
Win	7–2	(United States) Ben Shelton	4	Paris Masters, France	Hard (i)	F	7–6^{(7–5)}, 7–5	3	
Win	8–2	(United States) Francis Tiafoe	8	ATP Finals, Turin, Italy	Hard (i)	RR	6–2, 6–2	3	
Win	9–2	Daniil Medvedev	5	ATP Finals, Turin, Italy	Hard (i)	RR	6–2, 6–4	3	
Win	10–2	(Italy) Flavio Cobolli	6	ATP Finals, Turin, Italy	Hard (i)	RR	6–4, 6–1	3	
Win	11–2	(United States) Ben Shelton	4	ATP Finals, Turin, Italy	Hard (i)	SF	3–6, 6–3, 7–6^{(7–1)}	3	
Win	12–2	(Germany) Alexander Zverev	1	ATP Finals, Turin, Italy	Hard (i)	F	6–2, 7–6^{(9–7)}	3	

- Key: (Rk) first use, opponent rank; (Rd) round; (Rk) 2nd use, player rank; (Ref) reference; (F) final; (SF) semifinal; (QF) quarterfinal; (#R) rounds 4, 3, 2, 1; (RR) round-robin stage; (Q#) qualifying rounds or stages (3), 2, 1.

=== Finals ===
==== Singles: 7 (6 titles, 1 runner-up) ====
Category Grand Slam (1–0) ATP Finals (1–0) ATP 1000 (1–1) ATP 500 (3–0) ATP 250 (0–0)	Titles by surface Hard (6–0) Clay (0–1) Grass (0–0)	Titles by setting Outdoor (3–1) Indoor (3–0)

Result	W–L	Date	Tournament	Tier	Surface	Opponent	Score
Win	1–0	Jan 2026	Australian Open, Australia	Grand Slam	Hard	(Serbia) Novak Djokovic	2–6, 6–2, 6–3, 7–5
Win	2–0	Feb 2026	Qatar Open, Qatar	ATP 500	Hard	(France) Arthur Fils	6–2, 6–1
Loss	2–1	Apr 2026	Monte-Carlo Masters, Monaco	ATP 1000	Clay	(Italy) Jannik Sinner	6–7^{(5–7)}, 3–6
Win	3–1	Oct 2026	Japan Open, Japan	ATP 500	Hard	(Czech Republic) Jiří Lehečka	7–6^{(7–4)}, 6–4
Win	4–1	Oct 2026	Vienna Open, Austria	ATP 500	Hard (i)	(Australia) Alex de Minaur	6–1, 6–4
Win	5–1	Nov 2026	Paris Masters, France	ATP 1000	Hard (i)	(United States) Ben Shelton	7–6^{(7–5)}, 7–5
Win	6–1	Nov 2026	ATP Finals, Italy	ATP Finals	Hard (i)	(Germany) Alexander Zverev	6–2, 7–6^{(9–7)}

=== Earnings ===
- **Bold** font denotes tournament win

**Singles**
Event	Prize money	Year-to-date
**Australian Open**	**A$4,150,000**	$2,771,785
**Qatar Open**	**$529,945**	$3,301,730
Indian Wells Open	$340,190	$3,641,920
Miami Open	$61,865	$3,703,785
Monte-Carlo Masters	€532,120	$4,316,628
Barcelona Open	€41,590	$4,365,354
US Open	$780,000	$5,145,354
**Japan Open**	**$437,955**	$5,583,309
Shanghai Masters	$61,865	$5,645,174
**Vienna Open**	**€523,305**	$6,231,433
**Paris Masters**	**€947,370**	$7,287,608
**ATP Finals**	**$5,171,000**	$12,458,608
Bonus Pool ATP Ranking		
		$12,458,608
**Total**
		**$12,458,608**

Figures in United States dollars (USD) unless noted.

- source：2026 Singles Activity
- source：2026 Doubles Activity

== See also ==
- 2026 ATP Tour
- 2026 Novak Djokovic tennis season
- 2026 Jannik Sinner tennis season
- 2026 Alexander Zverev tennis season
