= 2026 Novak Djokovic tennis season =

Tennis player season

Novak Djokovic
- Novak Djokovic in the 2026 US Open
- Country: Serbia
- Calendar prize money: $4,070,490

Singles
- Season record: 21–10 (67.7%)
- Calendar titles: 1
- Current ranking: No. 12
- Ranking change from previous year: ▼8

Grand Slam & significant results
- Australian Open: F
- French Open: 3R
- Wimbledon: SF
- US Open: 1R
- Other tournaments

Doubles
- Season record: 1–1 (50.0%)
- Calendar titles: 0
- Current ranking: No.572
- Ranking change from previous year: ▼71

Mixed doubles
- Season record: 0–1 (0%)
- Calendar titles: 0
- Last updated on: 9 November 2026.

The 2026 Novak Djokovic tennis season, officially began on 18 January 2026, with the start of the 2026 Australian Open, after he withdrew from his first scheduled tournament 2026 Adelaide International.

During this season, Djokovic:

- Won his 102nd ATP Tour title.
- Surpassed Roger Federer and Feliciano López's joint 81 Grand Slam appearance record at the French Open with 82.
- Extended his record of 82 Grand Slam appearance record to 84.
- Tied Federer's Australian Open singles appearance record with 21.
- Tied Richard Gasquet French Open singles appearance record with 22.
- Surpassed Feliciano López's 21 Most consecutive French Open main draw appearances with 22.
- Became the first player to achieve 100 singles match wins at three different Grand Slam tournaments. Brought the count to 102 later.
- Surpassed Federer's record of 102 Australian Open match wins to 104.
- Surpassed Federer's record of 15 Australian Open singles quarterfinals with 16.
- Extended his record of 397 career Grand Slam matches wins to 409 and became the first player to achieve 400 or more career Grand Slam wins.
- Extended his record of 64 Grand Slam singles quarterfinals to 66. (Note: This is the all-time record for any singles player, male or female. The women's singles record is 54 (Chris Evert, Serena Williams).)
- Extended his record of 53 Grand Slam singles semifinals to 55. (Note: This is the all-time record for any singles player, male or female. The women's singles record is 52 (Chris Evert).)
- Extended his record of 37 Grand Slam singles finals to 38. (Note: This is the all-time record for any singles player, male or female. The women's singles record is 34 (Chris Evert).)
- Extended his record of 263 wins over top 10 ranked men's singles players to 269. (Note: This record depends on ATP ranking, which was introduced in 1973. For comparison, Open Era started in 1968.)
- Extended his record of 194 career hardcourt majors wins to 199. (Note: This record depends on existence of hardcourt majors, and there were none until US Open switched to hardcourts in 1978 (Australian Open switched even later). For comparison, Open Era started in 1968.)
- Extended his record of 418 Masters singles match wins to 421.
- Became the third player in the Open Era to play 1,400 tour-level matches, after Jimmy Connors and Roger Federer.
- Surpassed Federer's Wimbledon men's singles match win record of 105 to 107.
- Became the first player in the Open Era to win more than 80 opening-round matches at the majors.
- Extended his own record by winning at least one title in 21 consecutive seasons (2006–2026).

== Yearly summary ==
=== Early hard court season ===
==== Adelaide International ====
Djokovic was scheduled to play the Adelaide International, however he withdrew as he was unable to return to match sharpness and was "not physically ready to compete."

==== Australian Open ====
In the opening rounds of the 2026 Australian Open , Djokovic faced Pedro Martinez and Francesco Maestrelli and dominated in straight sets, setting up a match with Botic van de Zandschulp, who had upset him at Indian Wells last year. He defeated him in three relatively comfortable straight sets, and faced Lorenzo Musetti in the quarterfinal as Jakub Mensik withdrew due to an abdominal injury. After losing the first two sets to Musetti, the Italian would be forced to retire in the third set due to a right leg injury.

In the semi-finals, he would produce arguably one of the greatest performances in his career as he upset two-time defending champion Jannik Sinner in five sets, saving 16 break points along the way to advance to his 11th final at Melbourne Park. Following his victory, he would become the oldest finalist to reach the final at the Australian Open at 38 years and 255 days old, only being younger than Ken Rosewall. (Rosewall having been older overall at the 1974 US Open.)

However, Djokovic's attempt at a record-extending 25th major title ended in the final, where he was defeated by Carlos Alcaraz in four sets. The result ended Djokovic's perfect record in Australian Open finals and allowed Alcaraz to become the youngest male player to achieve a career Grand Slam. With his finalist appearance, Djokovic would rise to be World No 3 after the end of the Australian Open and maintain his streak of 5 consecutive Grand Slam semifinal appearances.

== All matches ==
This table chronicles all the matches of Novak Djokovic in 2026.

Key
| W | F | SF | QF | #R | RR | Q# | P# | DNQ | A | Z# | PO | G | S | B | NMS | NTI | P | NH |

(W) winner; (F) finalist; (SF) semifinalist; (QF) quarterfinalist; (#R) rounds 4, 3, 2, 1; (RR) round-robin stage; (Q#) qualification round; (P#) preliminary round; (DNQ) did not qualify; (A) absent; (Z#) Davis/Fed Cup Zonal Group (with number indication) or (PO) play-off; (G) gold, (S) silver or (B) bronze Olympic/Paralympic medal; (NMS) not a Masters tournament; (NTI) not a Tier I tournament; (P) postponed; (NH) not held; (SR) strike rate (events won / competed); (W–L) win–loss record.
To avoid confusion and double counting, these charts are updated at the conclusion of a tournament or when the player's participation has ended.

=== Singles matches ===
Key

- Q = Qualifier
- WC = Wild card
- LL = Lucky loser
- Alt = Alternate
- ITF = ITF entry
- PR = Protected ranking
- SR = Special ranking
- SE = Special exempt
- JE = Junior exempt
- JR = Junior Accelerator Programme entrant
- CO = College Accelerator Programme entrant
- NG = Next Gen Accelerator Program entrant
- w/o = Walkover
- r = Retired
- d = Defaulted

| Tournament | Match | Round | Opponent (seed or key) | Rank | Result | Score |
|---|---|---|---|---|---|---|
Adelaide International; Adelaide, Australia; ATP 250; Hard, outdoor 12–17 January 2026
| Adelaide International; Adelaide, Australia; ATP 250; Hard, outdoor 12–17 January 2026 | Withdrew | | | | | |
Australian Open; Melbourne, Australia; Grand Slam tournament Hard, outdoor 18 January – 1 February 2026
| Australian Open; Melbourne, Australia; Grand Slam tournament Hard, outdoor 18 January – 1 February 2026 | 1 / 1397 | 1R | (Spain) Pedro Martínez | 71 | Win | 6–3, 6–2, 6–2 |
| Australian Open; Melbourne, Australia; Grand Slam tournament Hard, outdoor 18 January – 1 February 2026 | 2 / 1398 | 2R | (Italy) Francesco Maestrelli (Q) | 141 | Win | 6–3, 6–2, 6–2 |
| Australian Open; Melbourne, Australia; Grand Slam tournament Hard, outdoor 18 January – 1 February 2026 | 3 / 1399 | 3R | (Netherlands) Botic van de Zandschulp | 75 | Win | 6–3, 6–4, 7–6^{(7–4)} |
| Australian Open; Melbourne, Australia; Grand Slam tournament Hard, outdoor 18 January – 1 February 2026 | – | 4R | (Czech Republic) Jakub Menšík (16) | 17 | Walkover | N/A |
| Australian Open; Melbourne, Australia; Grand Slam tournament Hard, outdoor 18 January – 1 February 2026 | 4 / 1400 | QF | (Italy) Lorenzo Musetti (5) | 5 | Win | 4–6, 3–6, 3–1 ret. |
| Australian Open; Melbourne, Australia; Grand Slam tournament Hard, outdoor 18 January – 1 February 2026 | 5 / 1401 | SF | (Italy) Jannik Sinner (2) | 2 | Win | 3–6, 6–3, 4–6, 6–4, 6–4 |
| Australian Open; Melbourne, Australia; Grand Slam tournament Hard, outdoor 18 January – 1 February 2026 | 6 / 1402 | F | (Spain) Carlos Alcaraz (1) | 1 | Loss | 6–2, 2–6, 3–6, 5–7 |
Qatar Open; Doha, Qatar; ATP 500; Hard, outdoor 16–21 February 2026
| Qatar Open; Doha, Qatar; ATP 500; Hard, outdoor 16–21 February 2026 | Withdrew | | | | | |
Indian Wells Open; Indian Wells, United States; ATP 1000; Hard, outdoor 4–15 March 2026
| Indian Wells Open; Indian Wells, United States; ATP 1000; Hard, outdoor 4–15 March 2026 | – | 1R | Bye | | | |
| Indian Wells Open; Indian Wells, United States; ATP 1000; Hard, outdoor 4–15 March 2026 | 7 / 1403 | 2R | (Poland) Kamil Majchrzak | 57 | Win | 4–6, 6–1, 6–2 |
| Indian Wells Open; Indian Wells, United States; ATP 1000; Hard, outdoor 4–15 March 2026 | 8 / 1404 | 3R | (United States) Aleksandar Kovacevic | 72 | Win | 6–4, 1–6, 6–4 |
| Indian Wells Open; Indian Wells, United States; ATP 1000; Hard, outdoor 4–15 March 2026 | 9 / 1405 | 4R | (United Kingdom) Jack Draper (14) | 14 | Loss | 6–4, 4–6, 6–7^{(5–7)} |
Miami Open; Miami Gardens, United States; ATP 1000; Hard, outdoor 18–29 March 2026
| Miami Open; Miami Gardens, United States; ATP 1000; Hard, outdoor 18–29 March 2026 | Withdrew | | | | | |
Monte-Carlo Masters; Roquebrune-Cap-Martin, France; ATP 1000; Clay, outdoor 5–12 April 2026
| Monte-Carlo Masters; Roquebrune-Cap-Martin, France; ATP 1000; Clay, outdoor 5–12 April 2026 | Withdrew | | | | | |
Madrid Open; Madrid, Spain; ATP 1000; Clay, outdoor 22 April − 3 May 2026
| Madrid Open; Madrid, Spain; ATP 1000; Clay, outdoor 22 April − 3 May 2026 | Withdrew | | | | | |
Italian Open; Rome, Italy; ATP 1000; Clay, outdoor 6–17 May 2026
| Italian Open; Rome, Italy; ATP 1000; Clay, outdoor 6–17 May 2026 | – | 1R | Bye | | | |
| Italian Open; Rome, Italy; ATP 1000; Clay, outdoor 6–17 May 2026 | 10 / 1406 | 2R | (Croatia) Dino Prižmić (Q) | 79 | Loss | 6–2, 2–6, 4–6 |
Geneva Open; Geneva, Switzerland; ATP 250; Clay, outdoor 18–24 May 2026
| Geneva Open; Geneva, Switzerland; ATP 250; Clay, outdoor 18–24 May 2026 | Withdrew | | | | | |
French Open; Paris, France; Grand Slam tournament Clay, outdoor 24 May – 7 June 2026
| French Open; Paris, France; Grand Slam tournament Clay, outdoor 24 May – 7 June 2026 | 11 / 1407 | 1R | (France) Giovanni Mpetshi Perricard | 83 | Win | 5–7, 7–5, 6–1, 6–4 |
| French Open; Paris, France; Grand Slam tournament Clay, outdoor 24 May – 7 June 2026 | 12 / 1408 | 2R | (France) Valentin Royer | 74 | Win | 6–3, 6–2, 6–7^{(7–9)}, 6–3 |
| French Open; Paris, France; Grand Slam tournament Clay, outdoor 24 May – 7 June 2026 | 13 / 1409 | 3R | (Brazil) João Fonseca (28) | 30 | Loss | 6–4, 6–4, 3–6, 5–7, 5–7 |
Wimbledon; London, United Kingdom; Grand Slam tournament Grass, outdoor 29 June – 12 July 2026
| Wimbledon; London, United Kingdom; Grand Slam tournament Grass, outdoor 29 June – 12 July 2026 | 14 / 1410 | 1R | (China) Wu Yibing | 102 | Win | 6–4, 5–7, 6–4, 6–4 |
| Wimbledon; London, United Kingdom; Grand Slam tournament Grass, outdoor 29 June – 12 July 2026 | 15 / 1411 | 2R | (Greece) Stefanos Tsitsipas | 87 | Win | 6–3, 6–4, 6–2 |
| Wimbledon; London, United Kingdom; Grand Slam tournament Grass, outdoor 29 June – 12 July 2026 | 16 / 1412 | 3R | (France) Arthur Rinderknech (25) | 28 | Win | 7–5, 6–4, 1–6, 7–6^{(7–4)} |
| Wimbledon; London, United Kingdom; Grand Slam tournament Grass, outdoor 29 June – 12 July 2026 | 17 / 1413 | 4R | (Note: Russian and Belarus players are not allowed to compete under the name or flag of their country following the Russian invasion of Ukraine.) Roman Safiullin (Q) | 132 | Win | 7–6^{(8–6)}, 6–3, 3–6, 6–3 |
| Wimbledon; London, United Kingdom; Grand Slam tournament Grass, outdoor 29 June – 12 July 2026 | 18 / 1414 | QF | (Canada) Félix Auger-Aliassime (3) | 4 | Win | 7–6^{(12–10)}, 3–6, 6–3, 6–7^{(4–7)}, 7–6^{(10–4)} |
| Wimbledon; London, United Kingdom; Grand Slam tournament Grass, outdoor 29 June – 12 July 2026 | 19 / 1415 | SF | (Italy) Jannik Sinner (1) | 1 | Loss | 4–6, 4–6, 4–6 |
Canadian Open; Montreal, Canada; ATP 1000; Hard, outdoor 2–13 August 2026
| Canadian Open; Montreal, Canada; ATP 1000; Hard, outdoor 2–13 August 2026 | Withdrew | | | | | |
Cincinnati Open; Cincinnati, United States; ATP 1000; Hard, outdoor 13–23 August 2026
| Cincinnati Open; Cincinnati, United States; ATP 1000; Hard, outdoor 13–23 August 2026 | – | 1R | Bye | | | |
| Cincinnati Open; Cincinnati, United States; ATP 1000; Hard, outdoor 13–23 August 2026 | 20 / 1416 | 2R | (Argentina) Thiago Agustín Tirante | 50 | Loss | 6–2, 4–6, 4–6 |
US Open; New York City, United States; Grand Slam tournament Hard, outdoor 30 August – 13 September 2026
| US Open; New York City, United States; Grand Slam tournament Hard, outdoor 30 August – 13 September 2026 | 21 / 1417 | 1R | (Argentina) Mariano Navone | 49 | Loss | 6–7^{(5–7)}, 7–5, 6–4, 2–6, 1–6 |
China Open; Beijing, China; ATP 500; Hard, outdoor 30 September – 6 October 2026
| China Open; Beijing, China; ATP 500; Hard, outdoor 30 September – 6 October 2026 | 22 / 1418 | 1R | (Portugal) Nuno Borges | 49 | Win | 6–3, 7–6^{(7–2)} |
| China Open; Beijing, China; ATP 500; Hard, outdoor 30 September – 6 October 2026 | 23 / 1419 | 2R | (China) Bu Yunchaokete (WC) | 104 | Win | 4–6, 7–6^{(7–2)}, 6–2 |
| China Open; Beijing, China; ATP 500; Hard, outdoor 30 September – 6 October 2026 | 24 / 1420 | QF | (Germany) Alexander Zverev (1) | 2 | Win | 4–6, 6–4, 6–4 |
| China Open; Beijing, China; ATP 500; Hard, outdoor 30 September – 6 October 2026 | 25 / 1421 | SF | Daniil Medvedev (3) | 5 | Win | 7–5, 5–3 def. |
| China Open; Beijing, China; ATP 500; Hard, outdoor 30 September – 6 October 2026 | 26 / 1422 | W | (Australia) Alex de Minaur (5) | 9 | Win (1) | 7–6^{(7–3)}, 0–1 ret. |
Shanghai Masters; Shanghai, China; ATP 1000; Hard, outdoor 7–18 October 2026
| Shanghai Masters; Shanghai, China; ATP 1000; Hard, outdoor 7–18 October 2026 | – | 1R | Bye | | | |
| Shanghai Masters; Shanghai, China; ATP 1000; Hard, outdoor 7–18 October 2026 | 27 / 1423 | 2R | (Poland) Hubert Hurkacz | 34 | Loss | 4–6, 3–6 |
Swiss Indoors; Basel, Switzerland; ATP 500; Hard, indoor 28 October – 1 November 2026
| Swiss Indoors; Basel, Switzerland; ATP 500; Hard, indoor 28 October – 1 November 2026 | 28 / 1424 | 1R | (France) Ugo Humbert | 38 | Win | 4–6, 6–3, 6–4 |
| Swiss Indoors; Basel, Switzerland; ATP 500; Hard, indoor 28 October – 1 November 2026 | 29 / 1425 | 2R | (Germany) Jan-Lennard Struff (SE) | 47 | Loss | 7–6^{(7–4)}, 5–7, 6–7^{(5–7)} |
Paris Masters; Paris, France; ATP 1000; Hard, outdoor 2–8 November 2026
| Paris Masters; Paris, France; ATP 1000; Hard, outdoor 2–8 November 2026 | 30 / 1426 | 1R | (Monaco) Valentin Vacherot | 27 | Win | 6–7^{(5–7)}, 7–5, 6–1 |
| Paris Masters; Paris, France; ATP 1000; Hard, outdoor 2–8 November 2026 | 31 / 1427 | 2R | (Australia) Rinky Hijikata (Q) | 83 | Loss | 6–2, 3–6, 3–6 |

=== Doubles matches ===
| Tournament | Match | Round | Opponent (seed or key) | Rank | Result | Score |
|---|---|---|---|---|---|---|
Indian Wells Open; Indian Wells, United States; ATP 1000; Hard, outdoor 4–15 March 2026; Partner: (Greece) Stefanos Tsitsipas
| Indian Wells Open; Indian Wells, United States; ATP 1000; Hard, outdoor 4–15 March 2026; Partner: (Greece) Stefanos Tsitsipas | 1 / 149 | 1R | (El Salvador) Marcelo Arévalo / (Croatia) Mate Pavić (3) | 6 / 6 | Win | 6–3, 6–2 |
| Indian Wells Open; Indian Wells, United States; ATP 1000; Hard, outdoor 4–15 March 2026; Partner: (Greece) Stefanos Tsitsipas | 2 / 150 | 2R | (France) Arthur Rinderknech / (Monaco) Valentin Vacherot | 361 / 1288 | Loss | 6–7^{(4–7)}, 5–7 |

=== Mixed doubles matches ===
| Tournament | Match | Round | Opponent (seed or key) | Rank | Result | Score |
|---|---|---|---|---|---|---|
US Open; New York City, United States; Grand Slam tournament Hard, outdoor 30 August – 13 September 2026; Partner: Aryna Sabalenka
| US Open; New York City, United States; Grand Slam tournament Hard, outdoor 30 August – 13 September 2026; Partner: Aryna Sabalenka | 1 / 7 | 1R | (Czech Republic) Kateřina Siniaková / (United Kingdom) Henry Patten (Q) | 1 / 1 | Loss | 4–1, 2–4, [2–10] |

== Exhibition matches ==
=== Singles ===
| Tournament | Match | Round | Opponent (seed or key) | Rank | Result | Score |
|---|---|---|---|---|---|---|
Australian Open Opening Week; Melbourne, Australia Hard, outdoor 15 January 2026
| Australian Open Opening Week; Melbourne, Australia Hard, outdoor 15 January 2026 | 1 | PO | (United States) Frances Tiafoe | 31 | Win | 6–3, 6–4 |
Giorgio Armani Tennis Classic; London, United Kingdom Grass, outdoor 26 June 2026
| Giorgio Armani Tennis Classic; London, United Kingdom Grass, outdoor 26 June 2026 | 2 | PO | (United States) Tommy Paul | 24 | Win | 6–3, 6–7^{(6–8)}, [7–5] |
6 Kings Slam; Riyadh, Saudi Arabia Hard, outdoor 27 – 30 December 2026
| 6 Kings Slam; Riyadh, Saudi Arabia Hard, outdoor 27 – 30 December 2026 | 3 | SF | TBD | | | |

== Schedule ==
Per Novak Djokovic, this is his current 2026 schedule (subject to change).

=== Singles schedule ===
| Date | Tournament | Location | Tier | Surface | Prev. result | Prev. points | New points | Result |
|---|---|---|---|---|---|---|---|---|
| 4 January 2026– 11 January 2026 | Brisbane International | Brisbane (AUS) | ATP 250 | Hard | QF | 50 | 0 | Withdrew |
| 12 January 2026– 17 January 2026 | Adelaide International | Adelaide (AUS) | ATP 250 | Hard | A | 0 | 0 | Withdrew |
| 18 January 2026– 1 February 2026 | Australian Open | Melbourne (AUS) | Grand Slam | Hard | SF | 800 | 1300 | Final (lost to Carlos Alcaraz, 6–2, 2–6, 3–6, 5–7) |
| 16 February 2026– 21 February 2026 | Qatar Open | Doha (QAT) | ATP 500 | Hard | 1R | 0 | 0 | Withdrew |
| 4 March 2026– 15 March 2026 | Indian Wells Open | Indian Wells (USA) | Masters 1000 | Hard | 2R | 10 | 100 | Fourth round (lost to Jack Draper, 6–4, 4–6, 6–7^{(5–7)}) |
| 18 March 2026– 29 March 2026 | Miami Open | Miami (USA) | Masters 1000 | Hard | F | 650 | 0 | Withdrew |
| 5 April 2026– 12 April 2026 | Monte-Carlo Masters | Roquebrune-Cap-Martin (FRA) | Masters 1000 | Clay | 2R | 10 | 0 | Withdrew |
| 22 April 2026– 3 May 2026 | Madrid Open | Madrid (ESP) | Masters 1000 | Clay | 2R | 10 | 0 | Withdrew |
| 6 May 2026– 17 May 2026 | Italian Open | Rome (ITA) | Masters 1000 | Clay | A | 0 | 10 | Second round (lost to Dino Prižmić, 6–2, 2–6, 4–6) |
| 17 May 2026– 23 May 2026 | Geneva Open | Geneva (SUI) | ATP 250 | Clay | W | 250 | 0 | Withdrew |
| 24 May 2026– 7 June 2026 | French Open | Paris (FRA) | Grand Slam | Clay | SF | 800 | 100 | Third round (lost to João Fonseca, 6–4, 6–4, 3–6, 5–7, 5–7) |
| 29 June 2026– 12 July 2026 | Wimbledon | London (GBR) | Grand Slam | Grass | SF | 800 | 800 | Semifinals (lost to Jannik Sinner, 4–6, 4–6, 4–6) |
| 2 August 2026– 13 August 2026 | Canadian Open | Montreal (CAN) | ATP 1000 | Hard | A | 0 | 0 | Withdrew |
| 13 August 2026– 23 August 2026 | Cincinnati Open | Cincinnati (USA) | ATP 1000 | Hard | A | 0 | 10 | Second round (lost to Thiago Agustín Tirante, 6–2, 4–6, 4–6) |
| 30 August 2026– 13 September 2026 | US Open | New York (USA) | Grand Slam | Hard | SF | 800 | 10 | First round (lost to Mariano Navone, 6–7^{(5–7)}, 7–5, 6–4, 2–6, 1–6) |
| 30 September 2026– 6 October 2026 | China Open | Beijing (CHN) | ATP 500 | Hard | A | 0 | 500 | Champion (defeated Alex de Minaur, 7–6^{(7–3)}, 0–1 ret.) |
| 7 October 2026– 18 October 2026 | Shanghai Masters | Shanghai (CHN) | ATP 1000 | Hard | SF | 400 | 10 | Second round (lost to Hubert Hurkacz, 4–6, 3–6) |
| 26 October 2026– 1 November 2026 | Swiss Indoors | Basel (SUI) | ATP 500 | Hard (i) | A | 0 | 50 | Second round (lost to Jan-Lennard Struff, 7–6^{(7–4)}, 5–7, 6–7^{(5–7)}) |
| 2 November 2026– 8 November 2026 | Paris Masters | Paris (FRA) | ATP 1000 | Hard (i) | A | 0 | 10 | Second round (lost to Rinky Hijikata, 6–2, 3–6, 3–6) |
| 15 November 2026– 22 November 2026 | ATP Finals | Turin (ITA) | Tour Finals | Hard (i) | A | 0 | 0 | Did not qualify |
| Total year-end points (as of Swiss Indoors ) | | | | | | 4580 | 2900 | |
| Total year-end points | | | | | | 4830 | 3150 | ▼1680 difference |
Source: Rankings breakdown

== Yearly records ==
=== Head-to-head matchups ===
Novak Djokovic has a 21–10 (67.7%) ATP match win–loss record in the 2026 season. His record against players ranked in the ATP rankings Top 10 at the time of the meeting is 6–2 (75.0%). Bold indicates player was ranked top 10 at the time of at least one meeting. The following list is ordered by number of wins:

- (Canada) **Félix Auger-Aliassime** 1–0
- (Portugal) Nuno Borges 1–0
- (France) Ugo Humbert 1–0
- (United States) Aleksandar Kovacevic 1–0
- (Italy) Francesco Maestrelli 1–0
- (Poland) Kamil Majchrzak 1–0
- (Spain) Pedro Martínez 1–0
- **Daniil Medvedev** 1–0
- (Italy) **Lorenzo Musetti** 1–0
- (Australia) **Alex de Minaur** 1–0
- (France) Giovanni Mpetshi Perricard 1–0
- (France) Arthur Rinderknech 1–0
- (France) Valentin Royer 1–0
- Roman Safiullin 1–0
- (Greece) Stefanos Tsitsipas 1–0
- (Monaco) Valentin Vacherot 1–0
- (Netherlands) Botic van de Zandschulp 1–0
- (Germany) **Alexander Zverev** 1–0
- (China) Wu Yibing 1–0
- (China) Bu Yunchaokete 1–0
- (Italy) **Jannik Sinner** 1–1
- (Spain) **Carlos Alcaraz** 0–1
- (United Kingdom) Jack Draper 0–1
- (Brazil) João Fonseca 0–1
- (Australia) Rinky Hijikata 0–1
- (Poland) Hubert Hurkacz 0–1
- (Argentina) Mariano Navone 0–1
- (Croatia) Dino Prižmić 0–1
- (Argentina) Thiago Agustín Tirante 0–1
- (Germany) Jan-Lennard Struff 0–1

* Statistics correct as of 10 November 2026.

=== Top 10 record (6–2) ===
| Category Grand Slam (3–2) ATP Finals (0–0) Laver Cup (0–0) Masters 1000 (0–0) 500 Series (3–0) 250 Series (0–0) | Wins by surface Hard (5–1) Clay (0–0) Grass (1–1) | Wins by setting Outdoor (6–2) Indoor (0–0) |

| Result | W–L | Player | Rk | Event | Surface | Rd | Score | Rk | Ref |
|---|---|---|---|---|---|---|---|---|---|
| Win | 1–0 | (Italy) Lorenzo Musetti | 5 | Australian Open, Australia | Hard | QF | 4–6, 3–6, 3–1 ret. | 4 | |
| Win | 2–0 | (Italy) Jannik Sinner | 2 | Australian Open, Australia | Hard | SF | 3–6, 6–3, 4–6, 6–4, 6–4 | 4 | |
| Loss | 2–1 | (Spain) Carlos Alcaraz | **1** | Australian Open, Australia | Hard | F | 6–2, 2–6, 3–6, 5–7 | 4 | |
| Win | 3–1 | (Canada) Félix Auger-Aliassime | 4 | Wimbledon, United Kingdom | Grass | QF | 7–6^{(12–10)}, 3–6, 6–3, 6–7^{(4–7)}, 7–6^{(10–4)} | 8 | |
| Loss | 3–2 | (Italy) Jannik Sinner | **1** | Wimbledon, United Kingdom | Grass | SF | 4–6, 4–6, 4–6 | 8 | |
| Win | 4–2 | (Germany) Alexander Zverev | 2 | China Open, China | Hard | QF | 4–6, 6–4, 6–4 | 11 | |
| Win | 5–2 | Daniil Medvedev | 5 | China Open, China | Hard | SF | 7–5, 5–3 def. | 11 | |
| Win | 6–2 | (Australia) Alex de Minaur | 9 | China Open, China | Hard | F | 7–6^{(7–3)}, 0–1 ret. | 11 | |

- Key: (Rk) first use, opponent rank; (Rd) round; (Rk) 2nd use, player rank; (Ref) reference; (F) final; (SF) semifinal; (QF) quarterfinal; (#R) rounds 4, 3, 2, 1; (RR) round-robin stage; (Q#) qualifying rounds or stages (3), 2, 1.

=== Finals ===
==== Singles: 2 (1 title, 1 runner-up) ====
| Category Grand Slam (0–1) ATP Finals (0–0) ATP 1000 (0–0) ATP 500 (1–0) ATP 250 (0–0) | Titles by surface Hard (1–1) Clay (0–0) Grass (0–0) | Titles by setting Outdoor (1–1) Indoor (0–0) |

| Result | W–L | Date | Tournament | Tier | Surface | Opponent | Score |
|---|---|---|---|---|---|---|---|
| Loss | 0–1 | Jan 2026 | Australian Open, Australia | Grand Slam | Hard | (Spain) Carlos Alcaraz | 6–2, 2–6, 3–6, 5–7 |
| Win | 1–1 | Oct 2026 | China Open, China | ATP 500 | Hard | (Australia) Alex de Minaur | 7–6 ^{(7–3)}, 0–1 ret. |

=== Earnings ===
**Singles**
| Event | Prize money | Year-to-date |
| Australian Open | A$2,150,000 | $1,435,985 |
| Indian Wells Open | $105,720 | $1,541,705 |
| Italian Open | €31,585 | $1,578,728 |
| French Open | €187,000 | $1,795,761 |
| Wimbledon Championships | £900,000 | $2,982,556 |
| Cincinnati Open | $36,110 | $3,018,666 |
| US Open | $140,000 | $3,158,666 |
| **China Open** | **$764,750** | $3,923,416 |
| Shanghai Masters | $36,110 | $3,959,526 |
| Swiss Indoors | €37,790 | $4,001,862 |
| Paris Masters | €45,520 | $4,052,640 |
| Bonus Pool ATP Ranking | | |
| | | $4,052,640 |
**Doubles**
| Event | Prize money | Year-to-date |
| Indian Wells Open | $17,850 | $17,850 |
**Total**
| | | **$4,070,490** |

Figures in United States dollars (USD) unless noted.

- source：2026 Singles Activity
- source：2026 Doubles Activity

== See also ==
- 2026 ATP Tour
- 2026 Carlos Alcaraz tennis season
- 2026 Jannik Sinner tennis season
- 2026 Alexander Zverev tennis season
