= 2026 Jannik Sinner tennis season =

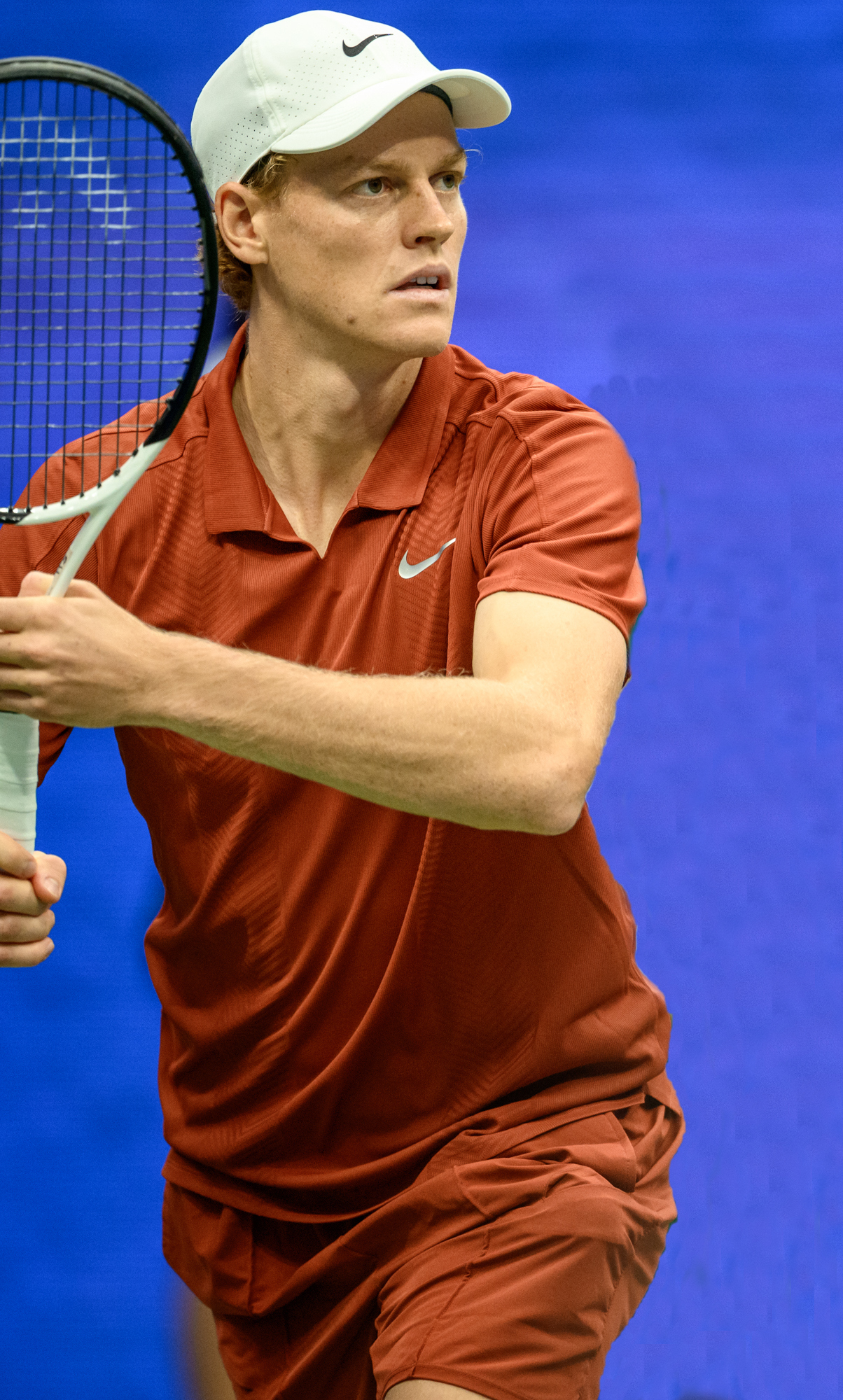
- Sinner at the 2025 US Open
- Full name: Jannik Sinner
- Country: Italy
- Calendar prize money: $11,607,775

Singles
- Season record: 44–3 (93.6%)
- Calendar titles: 6
- Current ranking: No. 2
- Ranking change from previous year: Steady

Grand Slam & significant results
- Australian Open: SF
- French Open: 2R
- Wimbledon: W
- US Open: A
- Other tournaments

Doubles
- Season record: 1–1 (50.0%)
- Current ranking: no ranking
- Ranking change from previous year: Steady

Injuries
- Injuries: Right knee injury
- Last updated on: 2 November 2026.

The 2026 Jannik Sinner tennis season began on 18 January 2026, with the start of the Australian Open in Melbourne. During the season, Sinner achieved a series of historic milestones, including becoming the youngest player in the Open Era, at 24 years and 211 days old, to win all hard-court Big Titles (2 Slams, 6 Masters 1000 and the ATP Finals) after claiming his first Indian Wells Masters title, and regaining the No. 1 position in the ATP rankings. He also earned his 350th career win, becoming the first man born in the 2000s to reach that milestone, and extended his total time as world No. 1 to 95 weeks.

Over the course of the season, Sinner established unprecedented consistency at ATP Masters 1000 level, becoming the first player in history to win three consecutive titles in the series (Paris, Indian Wells and Miami) without dropping a set. During this run, he surpassed Novak Djokovic's record for most consecutive sets won in Masters 1000 format (37) and became the first man in history to complete the Sunshine Double without dropping a set. He also won his first Big Title on clay at the Monte-Carlo Masters, defeating world No. 1 Carlos Alcaraz in straight sets, after which he regained the world No. 1 ranking.

At the Madrid Open, Sinner defeated Alexander Zverev (2026 Alexander Zverev tennis season) in the final, 6–1, 6–2, to claim his fifth consecutive ATP Masters 1000 title (Paris, Indian Wells, Miami, Monte-Carlo and Madrid), becoming the first man in history to achieve this feat, as well as the first player to win the first four Masters 1000 tournaments of a single season. He also became the fourth and youngest man to reach nine ATP Masters 1000 finals since the series began in 1990, further consolidating his position as the leading player of the season.

At the Italian Open in Rome, Sinner defeated Casper Ruud in the final to claim his sixth consecutive ATP Masters 1000 title and his tenth Masters 1000 crown overall. With the victory, he became only the second man in history, after Rafael Nadal in 2010, to win all three clay-court Masters 1000 events (Monte-Carlo, Madrid and Rome) in the same season. Sinner also completed the Career Golden Masters, becoming the youngest player ever to win all nine active ATP Masters 1000 tournaments at 24 years old, and only the second man to achieve the feat after Novak Djokovic, who completed it at age 31. In addition, he became the first Italian man to win the Rome Masters since Adriano Panatta in 1976, exactly 50 years earlier. The title further extended his own Open Era records for most consecutive ATP Masters 1000 titles won (6), most consecutive Masters 1000 titles won from the start of a season (5), and longest winning streak at Masters 1000 level (34 matches).

At the French Open, Sinner extended his winning streak to 30 matches before losing to Juan Manuel Cerúndolo in the second round, despite leading by two sets. The five-set defeat ended his winning streak and marked his earliest Grand Slam exit since the 2023 French Open.

At Wimbledon, Sinner successfully defended his title, defeating Alexander Zverev in the final, 6–7^{(7–9)}, 7–6^{(7–2)}, 6–3, 6–4, to win his second consecutive Wimbledon championship and his fifth Grand Slam singles title overall. During the tournament, he recovered from a five-set opening-round victory over Miomir Kecmanović before defeating Novak Djokovic in straight sets in the semi-finals and Zverev in four sets in the championship match. The final victory was also Sinner's 100th career match win at Grand Slam level, making him the first Italian man to reach the milestone. By reaching the final, he also became the first player to qualify for the 2026 ATP Finals.

== Event breakdown ==
=== Early hard court season ===
==== Australian Open ====
Sinner began his 2026 season at the Australian Open, returning as the defending champion for the second time. He reached the semifinals for the third time in his career, losing to Novak Djokovic after holding a two-sets-to-one lead and failing to convert critical break points. This was Sinner's first loss to Djokovic since 2023 and the first time he had not reached a major final since Wimbledon 2024.

==== Qatar Open ====
In a shock upset, Sinner lost to Jakub Menšík in three sets at the quarterfinals of the Qatar Open. Since 2024, this marked the second ever time Sinner lost before the finals in consecutive tournaments, and the first time since 2023 he has lost to a player outside of the top 10 on hard courts.

=== Sunshine Double tournaments ===
==== Indian Wells ====
With a straight sets victory against Alexander Zverev, Sinner reached the finals for the first time in his career. Facing Daniil Medvedev in the final, Sinner came back from 0–4 down in the second set tiebreak by winning 7 points in succession. He sealed his maiden Indian Wells victory and first title of the season, making him the first man in history to win consecutive Masters 1000 titles without conceding a set all tournament. Sinner also became the third and youngest man after Novak Djokovic and Roger Federer to claim 'Big Titles' across all hardcourt tournaments. These include his wins across all six Masters 1000 hardcourt events, ATP Finals, Australian Open and US Open.

==== Miami Open ====
After securing a straight sets win over Corentin Moutet in Round 3, Sinner surpassed Novak Djokovic in most consecutive sets won in the Masters 1000 format (37). He faced Jiří Lehečka in the final and emerged victorious in another straight sets win, claiming his second title of the year. Sinner completed the Sunshine Double for the first time in his career and became the first player in history to achieve this feat without conceding a set in both tournaments.

=== Clay season ===
==== Monte-Carlo Masters ====
Sinner began his clay court season with the Monte Carlo Masters. He entered the Doubles event with Zizou Bergs. Following their round 1 victory against Tomas Machac & Casper Ruud, Sinner withdrew to focus on his Singles matches.

He became the fourth man in history to win 20 consecutive matches at the Masters level after defeating Félix Auger-Aliassime in the quarterfinals. He faced Carlos Alcaraz in the final for the first time this year, defeating him in straight sets. This marked Sinner's first Masters 1000 clay title and his fourth Masters title in a row. He became the second ever man after Novak Djokovic to win the Sunshine Double and Monte Carlo Masters in succession. With this victory, Sinner regained the World No.1 ranking.

==== Madrid Open ====
Following his victory against Arthur Fils, Sinner became the fourth and youngest man in history to reach the finals of all nine Masters 1000 tournaments. With another straight sets victory against Alexander Zverev in the final, Sinner became the first man in history to win five consecutive Masters 1000 tournaments.

==== Italian Open ====
Following his victory against Andrey Rublev in the quarterfinals, Sinner surpassed Novak Djokovic for most consecutive matches won at the Masters 1000 level. Facing Casper Ruud in the final, Sinner emerged victorious and claimed his maiden Rome Open title. He achieved his tenth Masters 1000 title and completed the Career Golden Masters, making him the second and youngest man after Novak Djokovic to win all nine Masters 1000 events. He became the first Italian man in 50 years to lift the trophy on home soil since Adriano Panatta in 1976. He joined Rafael Nadal as the second ever player to win all the clay masters tournaments (Monte Carlo, Madrid and Rome) in the same season.

This also marked Sinner's sixth consecutive Masters 1000 victory, extending his historic win streak to 34 matches at this level.

==== French Open ====
At the 2026 French Open, where Sinner was attempting to complete a Career Grand Slam, he was defeated in the second round by world No. 56 Juan Manuel Cerúndolo. After leading 5–1 in the third set, Sinner experienced a noticeable drop in energy levels, possibly influenced by the extremely hot conditions, and won only two of the final twenty games. Sinner's loss ended a streak of nine consecutive major titles won between him and Alcaraz, dating back to the 2024 Australian Open, as well as a career-best winning streak of 30 matches. This marked the first time an incumbent world No. 1 failed to reach the third round of the French Open since Andre Agassi in 2000, and was the first time Sinner lost before the third round of a major since the 2023 French Open.

=== Grass season ===
==== Wimbledon ====
Following a three week break after his early round loss at the French Open and opting out of playing any warm up grass tournaments, Sinner arrived at Wimbledon as the defending champion and heavy favourite. He started his title defence bid against world No. 50 Miomir Kecmanovic, winning it in five sets after dropping the first and losing the third in tiebreak. He faced Novak Djokovic for the second time at the semi final of a Slam this year and for the fourth time at Wimbledon. Sinner won the match in straight sets.

He faced Alexander Zverev in the final, marking their fifth meeting of the year. Sinner successfully defended his Wimbledon title with a 4 set victory, making this his sixth title of the year and first Major title of the year. He became the tenth man to defend his Wimbledon title. This marked Zverev’s 10th consecutive loss against Sinner, having not won a match against him since 2023.

== All matches ==
This table chronicles all the matches of Jannik Sinner in 2026.

Key
W	F	SF	QF	#R	RR	Q#	P#	DNQ	A	Z#	PO	G	S	B	NMS	NTI	P	NH

(W) winner; (F) finalist; (SF) semifinalist; (QF) quarterfinalist; (#R) rounds 4, 3, 2, 1; (RR) round-robin stage; (Q#) qualification round; (P#) preliminary round; (DNQ) did not qualify; (A) absent; (Z#) Davis/Fed Cup Zonal Group (with number indication) or (PO) play-off; (G) gold, (S) silver or (B) bronze Olympic/Paralympic medal; (NMS) not a Masters tournament; (NTI) not a Tier I tournament; (P) postponed; (NH) not held; (SR) strike rate (events won / competed); (W–L) win–loss record.
To avoid confusion and double counting, these charts are updated at the conclusion of a tournament or when the player's participation has ended.

=== Singles matches ===
Tournament	Match	Round	Opponent (seed or key)	Rank	Result	Score
Australian Open; Melbourne, Australia; Grand Slam tournament Hard, outdoor 18 January – 1 February 2026
Australian Open; Melbourne, Australia; Grand Slam tournament Hard, outdoor 18 January – 1 February 2026	1 / 408	1R	(France) Hugo Gaston	93	Win	6–2, 6–1, 0–0 ret.
Australian Open; Melbourne, Australia; Grand Slam tournament Hard, outdoor 18 January – 1 February 2026	2 / 409	2R	(Australia) James Duckworth (WC)	88	Win	6–1, 6–4, 6–2
Australian Open; Melbourne, Australia; Grand Slam tournament Hard, outdoor 18 January – 1 February 2026	3 / 410	3R	(United States) Eliot Spizzirri	85	Win	4–6, 6–3, 6–4, 6–4
Australian Open; Melbourne, Australia; Grand Slam tournament Hard, outdoor 18 January – 1 February 2026	4 / 411	4R	(Italy) Luciano Darderi (22)	25	Win	6–1, 6–3, 7–6^{(7–2)}
Australian Open; Melbourne, Australia; Grand Slam tournament Hard, outdoor 18 January – 1 February 2026	5 / 412	QF	(United States) Ben Shelton (8)	7	Win	6–3, 6–4, 6–4
Australian Open; Melbourne, Australia; Grand Slam tournament Hard, outdoor 18 January – 1 February 2026	6 / 413	SF	(Serbia) Novak Djokovic (4)	4	Loss	6–3, 3–6, 6–4, 4–6, 4–6
Qatar Open; Doha, Qatar; ATP 500; Hard, outdoor 16–21 February 2026
Qatar Open; Doha, Qatar; ATP 500; Hard, outdoor 16–21 February 2026	7 / 414	1R	(Czech Republic) Tomáš Macháč	31	Win	6–1, 6–4
Qatar Open; Doha, Qatar; ATP 500; Hard, outdoor 16–21 February 2026	8 / 415	2R	(Australia) Alexei Popyrin	53	Win	6–3, 7–5
Qatar Open; Doha, Qatar; ATP 500; Hard, outdoor 16–21 February 2026	9 / 416	QF	(Czech Republic) Jakub Menšík	16	Loss	6–7^{(3–7)}, 6–2, 3–6
Indian Wells Open; Indian Wells, United States; ATP 1000; Hard, outdoor 4–15 March 2026
Indian Wells Open; Indian Wells, United States; ATP 1000; Hard, outdoor 4–15 March 2026	–	1R	Bye			
Indian Wells Open; Indian Wells, United States; ATP 1000; Hard, outdoor 4–15 March 2026	10 / 417	2R	(Czech Republic) Dalibor Svrčina (Q)	109	Win	6–1, 6–1
Indian Wells Open; Indian Wells, United States; ATP 1000; Hard, outdoor 4–15 March 2026	11 / 418	3R	(Canada) Denis Shapovalov	39	Win	6–3, 6–2
Indian Wells Open; Indian Wells, United States; ATP 1000; Hard, outdoor 4–15 March 2026	12 / 419	4R	(Brazil) João Fonseca	35	Win	7–6^{(8–6)}, 7–6^{(7–4)}
Indian Wells Open; Indian Wells, United States; ATP 1000; Hard, outdoor 4–15 March 2026	13 / 420	QF	(United States) Learner Tien (25)	27	Win	6–1, 6–2
Indian Wells Open; Indian Wells, United States; ATP 1000; Hard, outdoor 4–15 March 2026	14 / 421	SF	(Germany) Alexander Zverev (4)	4	Win	6–2, 6–4
Indian Wells Open; Indian Wells, United States; ATP 1000; Hard, outdoor 4–15 March 2026	15 / 422	W	(Note: Russian and Belarus players are not allowed to compete under the name or flag of their country following the Russian invasion of Ukraine.) Daniil Medvedev (11)	11	Win (1)	7–6^{(8–6)}, 7–6^{(7–4)}
Miami Open; Miami Gardens, United States; ATP 1000; Hard, outdoor 18–29 March 2026
Miami Open; Miami Gardens, United States; ATP 1000; Hard, outdoor 18–29 March 2026	–	1R	Bye			
Miami Open; Miami Gardens, United States; ATP 1000; Hard, outdoor 18–29 March 2026	16 / 423	2R	(Bosnia and Herzegovina) Damir Džumhur	76	Win	6–3, 6–3
Miami Open; Miami Gardens, United States; ATP 1000; Hard, outdoor 18–29 March 2026	17 / 424	3R	(France) Corentin Moutet (30)	33	Win	6–1, 6–4
Miami Open; Miami Gardens, United States; ATP 1000; Hard, outdoor 18–29 March 2026	18 / 425	4R	(United States) Alex Michelsen	40	Win	7–5, 7–6^{(7–4)}
Miami Open; Miami Gardens, United States; ATP 1000; Hard, outdoor 18–29 March 2026	19 / 426	QF	(United States) Frances Tiafoe (19)	20	Win	6–2, 6–2
Miami Open; Miami Gardens, United States; ATP 1000; Hard, outdoor 18–29 March 2026	20 / 427	SF	(Germany) Alexander Zverev (3)	4	Win	6–3, 7–6^{(7–4)}
Miami Open; Miami Gardens, United States; ATP 1000; Hard, outdoor 18–29 March 2026	21 / 428	W	(Czech Republic) Jiří Lehečka (21)	22	Win (2)	6–4, 6–4
Monte-Carlo Masters; Roquebrune-Cap-Martin, France; ATP 1000; Clay, outdoor 5–12 April 2026
Monte-Carlo Masters; Roquebrune-Cap-Martin, France; ATP 1000; Clay, outdoor 5–12 April 2026	–	1R	Bye			
Monte-Carlo Masters; Roquebrune-Cap-Martin, France; ATP 1000; Clay, outdoor 5–12 April 2026	22 / 429	2R	(France) Ugo Humbert	34	Win	6–3, 6–0
Monte-Carlo Masters; Roquebrune-Cap-Martin, France; ATP 1000; Clay, outdoor 5–12 April 2026	23 / 430	3R	(Czech Republic) Tomáš Macháč	53	Win	6–1, 6–7^{(3–7)}, 6–3
Monte-Carlo Masters; Roquebrune-Cap-Martin, France; ATP 1000; Clay, outdoor 5–12 April 2026	24 / 431	QF	(Canada) Félix Auger-Aliassime (6)	7	Win	6–3, 6–4
Monte-Carlo Masters; Roquebrune-Cap-Martin, France; ATP 1000; Clay, outdoor 5–12 April 2026	25 / 432	SF	(Germany) Alexander Zverev (3)	3	Win	6–1, 6–4
Monte-Carlo Masters; Roquebrune-Cap-Martin, France; ATP 1000; Clay, outdoor 5–12 April 2026	26 / 433	W	(Spain) Carlos Alcaraz (1)	1	Win (3)	7–6^{(7–5)}, 6–3
Madrid Open; Madrid, Spain; ATP 1000; Clay, outdoor 22 April – 3 May 2026
Madrid Open; Madrid, Spain; ATP 1000; Clay, outdoor 22 April – 3 May 2026	–	1R	Bye			
Madrid Open; Madrid, Spain; ATP 1000; Clay, outdoor 22 April – 3 May 2026	27 / 434	2R	(France) Benjamin Bonzi (Q)	104	Win	6–7^{(6–8)}, 6–1, 6–4
Madrid Open; Madrid, Spain; ATP 1000; Clay, outdoor 22 April – 3 May 2026	28 / 435	3R	(Denmark) Elmer Møller (Q)	169	Win	6–2, 6–3
Madrid Open; Madrid, Spain; ATP 1000; Clay, outdoor 22 April – 3 May 2026	29 / 436	4R	(United Kingdom) Cameron Norrie (19)	23	Win	6–2, 7–5
Madrid Open; Madrid, Spain; ATP 1000; Clay, outdoor 22 April – 3 May 2026	30 / 437	QF	(Spain) Rafael Jódar (WC)	42	Win	6–2, 7–6^{(7–0)}
Madrid Open; Madrid, Spain; ATP 1000; Clay, outdoor 22 April – 3 May 2026	31 / 438	SF	(France) Arthur Fils (21)	25	Win	6–2, 6–4
Madrid Open; Madrid, Spain; ATP 1000; Clay, outdoor 22 April – 3 May 2026	32 / 439	W	(Germany) Alexander Zverev (2)	3	Win (4)	6–1, 6–2
Italian Open; Rome, Italy; ATP 1000; Clay, outdoor 6–17 May 2026
Italian Open; Rome, Italy; ATP 1000; Clay, outdoor 6–17 May 2026	–	1R	Bye			
Italian Open; Rome, Italy; ATP 1000; Clay, outdoor 6–17 May 2026	33 / 440	2R	(Austria) Sebastian Ofner	82	Win	6–3, 6–4
Italian Open; Rome, Italy; ATP 1000; Clay, outdoor 6–17 May 2026	34 / 441	3R	(Australia) Alexei Popyrin	60	Win	6–2, 6–0
Italian Open; Rome, Italy; ATP 1000; Clay, outdoor 6–17 May 2026	35 / 442	4R	(Italy) Andrea Pellegrino (Q)	155	Win	6–2, 6–3
Italian Open; Rome, Italy; ATP 1000; Clay, outdoor 6–17 May 2026	36 / 443	QF	Andrey Rublev (12)	14	Win	6–2, 6–4
Italian Open; Rome, Italy; ATP 1000; Clay, outdoor 6–17 May 2026	37 / 444	SF	Daniil Medvedev (7)	9	Win	6–2, 5–7, 6–4
Italian Open; Rome, Italy; ATP 1000; Clay, outdoor 6–17 May 2026	38 / 445	W	(Norway) Casper Ruud (23)	25	Win (5)	6–4, 6–4
French Open; Paris, France; Grand Slam tournament Clay, outdoor 24 May – 7 June 2026
French Open; Paris, France; Grand Slam tournament Clay, outdoor 24 May – 7 June 2026	39 / 446	1R	(France) Clément Tabur (WC)	171	Win	6–1, 6–3, 6–4
French Open; Paris, France; Grand Slam tournament Clay, outdoor 24 May – 7 June 2026	40 / 447	2R	(Argentina) Juan Manuel Cerúndolo	56	Loss	6–3, 6–2, 5–7, 1–6, 1–6
Halle Open; Halle, Germany; ATP 500; Grass, outdoor 15–21 June 2026
Halle Open; Halle, Germany; ATP 500; Grass, outdoor 15–21 June 2026	Withdrew					
Wimbledon; London, United Kingdom; Grand Slam tournament Grass, outdoor 29 June – 12 July 2026
Wimbledon; London, United Kingdom; Grand Slam tournament Grass, outdoor 29 June – 12 July 2026	41 / 448	1R	(Serbia) Miomir Kecmanović	50	Win	4–6, 6–3, 6–7^{(6–8)}, 6–2, 6–3
Wimbledon; London, United Kingdom; Grand Slam tournament Grass, outdoor 29 June – 12 July 2026	42 / 449	2R	(Portugal) Nuno Borges	48	Win	7–6^{(7–4)}, 7–6^{(7–2)}, 6–4
Wimbledon; London, United Kingdom; Grand Slam tournament Grass, outdoor 29 June – 12 July 2026	43 / 450	3R	(United States) Jenson Brooksby	81	Win	6–4, 6–3, 6–4
Wimbledon; London, United Kingdom; Grand Slam tournament Grass, outdoor 29 June – 12 July 2026	44 / 451	4R	(Japan) Shintaro Mochizuki (Q)	151	Win	6–3, 7–6^{(7–0)}, 6–3
Wimbledon; London, United Kingdom; Grand Slam tournament Grass, outdoor 29 June – 12 July 2026	45 / 452	QF	(Germany) Jan-Lennard Struff	74	Win	7–5, 7–6^{(7–4)}, 6–3
Wimbledon; London, United Kingdom; Grand Slam tournament Grass, outdoor 29 June – 12 July 2026	46 / 453	SF	(Serbia) Novak Djokovic (7)	8	Win	6–4, 6–4, 6–4
Wimbledon; London, United Kingdom; Grand Slam tournament Grass, outdoor 29 June – 12 July 2026	47 / 454	W	(Germany) Alexander Zverev (2)	3	Win (6)	6–7^{(7–9)}, 7–6^{(7–2)}, 6–3, 6–4
Canadian Open; Montreal, Canada; ATP 1000; Hard, outdoor 2–13 August 2026
Canadian Open; Montreal, Canada; ATP 1000; Hard, outdoor 2–13 August 2026	Withdrew					
Cincinnati Open; Cincinnati, United States; ATP 1000; Hard, outdoor 13–23 August 2026
Cincinnati Open; Cincinnati, United States; ATP 1000; Hard, outdoor 13–23 August 2026	Withdrew					
US Open; New York City, United States; Grand Slam tournament Hard, outdoor 30 August – 13 September 2026
US Open; New York City, United States; Grand Slam tournament Hard, outdoor 30 August – 13 September 2026	Withdrew					
China Open; Beijing, China; ATP 500; Hard, outdoor 30 September – 6 October 2026
China Open; Beijing, China; ATP 500; Hard, outdoor 30 September – 6 October 2026	Withdrew					
Shanghai Masters; Shanghai, China; ATP 1000; Hard, outdoor 7–18 October 2026
Shanghai Masters; Shanghai, China; ATP 1000; Hard, outdoor 7–18 October 2026	Withdrew					
Vienna Open; Vienna, Austria; ATP 500; Hard, indoor 26 October – 1 November 2026
Vienna Open; Vienna, Austria; ATP 500; Hard, indoor 26 October – 1 November 2026	Withdrew					
Paris Masters; Paris, France; ATP 1000; Hard, indoor 2–8 November 2026
Paris Masters; Paris, France; ATP 1000; Hard, indoor 2–8 November 2026	Withdrew					
ATP Finals; Turin, Italy; ATP Finals; Hard, indoor 15–22 November 2026
ATP Finals; Turin, Italy; ATP Finals; Hard, indoor 15–22 November 2026	Withdrew					

=== Doubles matches ===
Tournament	Match	Round	Opponent (seed or key)	Rank	Result	Score
Indian Wells Open; Indian Wells, United States; ATP 1000; Hard, outdoor 4–15 March 2026; Partner: (United States) Reilly Opelka
Indian Wells Open; Indian Wells, United States; ATP 1000; Hard, outdoor 4–15 March 2026; Partner: (United States) Reilly Opelka	1 / 52	1R	(Spain) Marcel Granollers / (Argentina) Horacio Zeballos (1)	3 / 2	Loss	4–6, 4–6
Monte-Carlo Masters; Roquebrune-Cap-Martin, France; ATP 1000; Clay, outdoor 5–12 April 2026; Partner: (Belgium) Zizou Bergs
Monte-Carlo Masters; Roquebrune-Cap-Martin, France; ATP 1000; Clay, outdoor 5–12 April 2026; Partner: (Belgium) Zizou Bergs	2 / 53	1R	(Czech Republic) Tomáš Macháč / (Norway) Casper Ruud	128 / –	Win	6–4, 7–5
Monte-Carlo Masters; Roquebrune-Cap-Martin, France; ATP 1000; Clay, outdoor 5–12 April 2026; Partner: (Belgium) Zizou Bergs	–	2R	(Argentina) Guido Andreozzi / (France) Manuel Guinard (8)	18 / 16	Withdrew	N/A

== Exhibition matches ==
=== Singles ===
Tournament	Match	Round	Opponent (seed or key)	Rank	Result	Score
Hyundai Card Super Match; Seoul, South Korea Hard, outdoor 10 January 2026
Hyundai Card Super Match; Seoul, South Korea Hard, outdoor 10 January 2026	1	PO	(Spain) Carlos Alcaraz	1	Loss	5–7, 6–7^{(6–8)}
Australian Open Opening Week; Melbourne, Australia Hard, outdoor 16 January 2026
Australian Open Opening Week; Melbourne, Australia Hard, outdoor 16 January 2026	2	PO	(Canada) Félix Auger-Aliassime	7	Win	6–4, 4–6, [10–4]
Giorgio Armani Tennis Classic; London, United Kingdom Grass, outdoor 24 June 2026
Giorgio Armani Tennis Classic; London, United Kingdom Grass, outdoor 24 June 2026	3	PO	(United Kingdom) Cameron Norrie	29	Win	6–3, 6–3

== Schedule ==
Per Jannik Sinner, this is his current 2026 schedule (subject to change).

=== Singles schedule ===
Date	Tournament	Location	Tier	Surface	Prev. result	Prev. points	New points	Result
18 January 2026– 1 February 2026	Australian Open	Melbourne (AUS)	Grand Slam	Hard	W	2000	800	Semifinals (lost to Novak Djokovic, 6–3, 3–6, 6–4, 4–6, 4–6)
16 February 2026– 21 February 2026	Qatar Open	Doha (QAT)	ATP 500	Hard	A (Note: Did not compete during WADA suspension of 3 months)	0	100	Quarterfinals (lost to Jakub Menšík, 6–7^{(3–7)}, 6–2, 3–6)
4 March 2026– 15 March 2026	Indian Wells Open	Indian Wells (USA)	ATP 1000	Hard	A	0	1000	Champion (defeated Daniil Medvedev, 7–6^{(8–6)}, 7–6^{(7–4)})
18 March 2026– 29 March 2026	Miami Open	Miami (USA)	ATP 1000	Hard	A	0	1000	Champion (defeated Jiří Lehečka, 6–4, 6–4)
5 April 2026– 12 April 2026	Monte-Carlo Masters	Roquebrune-Cap-Martin (FRA)	ATP 1000	Clay	A	0	1000	Champion (defeated Carlos Alcaraz, 7–6^{(7–5)}, 6–3)
22 April 2026– 3 May 2026	Madrid Open	Madrid (ESP)	ATP 1000	Clay	A	0	1000	Champion (defeated Alexander Zverev, 6–1, 6–2)
6 May 2026– 17 May 2026	Italian Open	Rome (ITA)	ATP 1000	Clay	F	650	1000	Champion (defeated Casper Ruud, 6–4, 6–4)
24 May 2026– 7 June 2026	French Open	Paris (FRA)	Grand Slam	Clay	F	1300	50	Second round (lost to Juan Manuel Cerúndolo, 6–3, 6–2, 5–7, 1–6, 1–6)
15 June 2026– 21 June 2026	Halle Open	Halle (GER)	ATP 500	Grass	2R	50	0	Withdrew
29 June 2026– 12 July 2026	Wimbledon	London (GBR)	Grand Slam	Grass	W	2000	2000	Champion (defeated Alexander Zverev, 6–7^{(7–9)}, 7–6^{(7–2)}, 6–3, 6–4)
2 August 2026– 13 August 2026	Canadian Open	Montreal (CAN)	ATP 1000	Hard	A	0	0	Withdrew
13 August 2026– 23 August 2026	Cincinnati Open	Cincinnati (USA)	ATP 1000	Hard	F	650	0	Withdrew
30 August 2026– 13 September 2026	US Open	New York (USA)	Grand Slam	Hard	F	1300	0	Withdrew
30 September 2026– 6 October 2026	China Open	Beijing (CHN)	ATP 500	Hard	W	500	0	Withdrew
7 October 2026– 18 October 2026	Shanghai Masters	Shanghai (CHN)	ATP 1000	Hard	3R	50	0	Withdrew
28 October 2026– 1 November 2026	Vienna Open	Vienna (AUT)	ATP 500	Hard (i)	W	500	0	Withdrew
2 November 2026– 8 November 2026	Paris Masters	Paris (FRA)	ATP 1000	Hard (i)	W	1000	0	Withdrew
15 November 2026– 22 November 2026	ATP Finals	Turin (ITA)	Tour Finals	Hard (i)	W	1500	0	Withdrew
Total year-end points (as of ATP Finals)						11500	7950	
Total year-end points						11500	7950	▼3550 difference
Source: Rankings breakdown

== Yearly records ==
=== Head-to-head matchups ===
Jannik Sinner has a 44–3 (93.6%) ATP match win–loss record in the 2026 season. His record against players ranked in the ATP rankings Top 10 at the time of the meeting is 10–1 (90.9%). Bold indicates player was ranked top 10 at the time of at least one meeting. The following list is ordered by number of wins:

- (Germany) **Alexander Zverev** 5–0
- (Czech Republic) Tomáš Macháč 2–0
- **Daniil Medvedev** 2–0
- (Australia) Alexei Popyrin 2–0
- (Spain) **Carlos Alcaraz** 1–0
- (Canada) **Félix Auger-Aliassime** 1–0
- (France) Benjamin Bonzi 1–0
- (Portugal) Nuno Borges 1–0
- (United States) Jenson Brooksby 1–0
- (Italy) Luciano Darderi 1–0
- (Australia) James Duckworth 1–0
- (Bosnia and Herzegovina) Damir Džumhur 1–0
- (France) Arthur Fils 1–0
- (Brazil) João Fonseca 1–0
- (France) Hugo Gaston 1–0
- (France) Ugo Humbert 1–0
- (Spain) Rafael Jódar 1–0
- (Serbia) Miomir Kecmanović 1–0
- (Czech Republic) Jiří Lehečka 1–0
- (United States) Alex Michelsen 1–0
- (Japan) Shintaro Mochizuki 1–0
- (Denmark) Elmer Møller 1–0
- (France) Corentin Moutet 1–0
- (United Kingdom) Cameron Norrie 1–0
- (Austria) Sebastian Ofner 1–0
- (Italy) Andrea Pellegrino 1–0
- Andrey Rublev 1–0
- (Norway) Casper Ruud 1–0
- (Canada) Denis Shapovalov 1–0
- (United States) **Ben Shelton** 1–0
- (United States) Eliot Spizzirri 1–0
- (Germany) Jan-Lennard Struff 1–0
- (Czech Republic) Dalibor Svrčina 1–0
- (France) Clément Tabur 1–0
- (United States) Frances Tiafoe 1–0
- (United States) Learner Tien 1–0
- (Serbia) **Novak Djokovic** 1–1
- (Argentina) Juan Manuel Cerúndolo 0–1
- (Czech Republic) Jakub Menšík 0–1

* Statistics correct as of 12 July 2026.

=== Top 10 record (10–1) ===
Category Grand Slam (3–1) ATP Finals (0–0) Laver Cup (0–0) Masters 1000 (7–0) 500 Series (0–0) 250 Series (0–0)	Wins by surface Hard (3–1) Clay (5–0) Grass (2–0)	Wins by setting Outdoor (10–1) Indoor (0–0)

Result	W–L	Player	Rk	Event	Surface	Rd	Score	Rk	Ref
Win	1–0	(United States) Ben Shelton	7	Australian Open, Australia	Hard	QF	6–3, 6–4, 6–4	2	
Loss	1–1	(Serbia) Novak Djokovic	4	Australian Open, Australia	Hard	SF	6–3, 3–6, 6–4, 4–6, 4–6	2	
Win	2–1	(Germany) Alexander Zverev	4	Indian Wells Open, United States	Hard	SF	6–2, 6–4	2	
Win	3–1	(Germany) Alexander Zverev	4	Miami Open, United States	Hard	SF	6–3, 7–6^{(7–4)}	2	
Win	4–1	(Canada) Félix Auger-Aliassime	7	Monte-Carlo Masters, France	Clay	QF	6–3, 6–4	2	
Win	5–1	(Germany) Alexander Zverev	3	Monte-Carlo Masters, France	Clay	SF	6–1, 6–4	2	
Win	6–1	(Spain) Carlos Alcaraz	**1**	Monte-Carlo Masters, France	Clay	F	7–6^{(7–5)}, 6–3	2	
Win	7–1	(Germany) Alexander Zverev	3	Madrid Open, Spain	Clay	F	6–1, 6–2	**1**	
Win	8–1	Daniil Medvedev	9	Italian Open, Italy	Clay	SF	6–2, 5–7, 6–4	**1**	
Win	9–1	(Serbia) Novak Djokovic	8	Wimbledon, United Kingdom	Grass	SF	6–4, 6–4, 6–4	**1**	
Win	10–1	(Germany) Alexander Zverev	3	Wimbledon, United Kingdom	Grass	F	6–7^{(7–9)}, 7–6^{(7–2)}, 6–3, 6–4	**1**	

- Key: (Rk) first use, opponent rank; (Rd) round; (Rk) 2nd use, player rank; (Ref) reference; (F) final; (SF) semifinal; (QF) quarterfinal; (#R) rounds 4, 3, 2, 1; (RR) round-robin stage; (Q#) qualifying rounds or stages (3), 2, 1.

=== Finals ===
==== Singles: 6 (6 titles) ====
Category Grand Slam (1–0) ATP Finals (0–0) ATP 1000 (5–0) ATP 500 (0–0) ATP 250 (0–0)	Titles by surface Hard (2–0) Clay (3–0) Grass (1–0)	Titles by setting Outdoor (6–0) Indoor (0–0)

Result	W–L	Date	Tournament	Tier	Surface	Opponent	Score
Win	1–0	Mar 2026	Indian Wells Open, United States	Masters 1000	Hard	Daniil Medvedev	7–6^{(8–6)}, 7–6^{(7–4)}
Win	2–0	Mar 2026	Miami Open, United States	Masters 1000	Hard	(Czech Republic) Jiří Lehečka	6–4, 6–4
Win	3–0	Apr 2026	Monte-Carlo Masters, France	Masters 1000	Clay	(Spain) Carlos Alcaraz	7–6^{(7–5)}, 6–3
Win	4–0	May 2026	Madrid Open, Spain	Masters 1000	Clay	(Germany) Alexander Zverev	6–1, 6–2
Win	5–0	May 2026	Italian Open, Italy	Masters 1000	Clay	(Norway) Casper Ruud	6–4, 6–4
Win	6–0	Jul 2026	Wimbledon, United Kingdom	Grand Slam	Grass	(Germany) Alexander Zverev	6–7^{(7–9)}, 7–6^{(7–2)}, 6–3, 6–4

=== Earnings ===
- **Bold** font denotes tournament win

**Singles**
Event	Prize money	Year-to-date
Australian Open	A$1,250,000	$834,875
Qatar Open	$77,625	$912,500
**Indian Wells Open**	**$1,151,380**	$2,063,880
**Miami Open**	**$1,151,380**	$3,215,260
**Monte-Carlo Masters**	**€974,370**	$4,337,441
**Madrid Open**	**€1,007,615**	$5,521,867
**Italian Open**	**€1,007,615**	$6,702,466
French Open	€130,000	$6,853,344
**Wimbledon Championships**	**£3,600,000**	$11,589,515
Bonus Pool ATP Ranking		
		$11,589,515
**Doubles**
Event	Prize money	Year-to-date
Indian Wells Open	$9,755	$9,755
Monte-Carlo Masters	€7,385	$8,505
		$18,260
**Total**
		**$11,607,775**

Figures in United States dollars (USD) unless noted.

- source: 2026 Singles Activity
- source: 2026 Doubles Activity

== See also ==
- 2026 ATP Tour
- 2026 Novak Djokovic tennis season
- 2026 Carlos Alcaraz tennis season
- 2026 Alexander Zverev tennis season
