= 2026 Japan Open Tennis Championships – Doubles =

Doubles
- 2026 Japan Open Tennis Championships

Final
- Champions: (United States) Austin Krajicek (Croatia) Nikola Mektić
- Runners-up: (France) Théo Arribagé (France) Albano Olivetti
- Score: 7–6^{(7–5)}, 5–7, [10–6]

Events
Singles	Doubles
- Japan Open

Austin Krajicek and Nikola Mektić defeated Théo Arribagé and Albano Olivetti in the final, 7–6^{(7–5)}, 5–7, [10–6] to win the doubles tennis title at the 2026 Japan Open Tennis Championships.

Hugo Nys and Édouard Roger-Vasselin were the defending champions, but lost in the quarterfinals to Rinky Hijikata and Kaito Uesugi.

== Seeds ==
1. (Italy) Simone Bolelli / (Italy) Andrea Vavassori (semifinals)
2. (France) Théo Arribagé / (France) Albano Olivetti (final)
3. (Monaco) Hugo Nys / (France) Édouard Roger-Vasselin (quarterfinals)
4. (United States) Austin Krajicek / (Croatia) Nikola Mektić (champions)

== Draw ==
Key

- Q = Qualifier
- WC = Wild card
- LL = Lucky loser
- Alt = Alternate
- ITF = ITF entry
- PR = Protected ranking
- SR = Special ranking
- SE = Special exempt
- JE = Junior exempt
- JR = Junior Accelerator Programme entrant
- CO = College Accelerator Programme entrant
- NG = Next Gen Accelerator Program entrant
- w/o = Walkover
- r = Retired
- d = Defaulted

First round
1	(Italy) S Bolelli (Italy) A Vavassori	7^{7}	7^{7}
WC	(Japan) S Mochizuki (Japan) S Watanbe	6^{1}	6^{2}
(United Kingdom) L Johnson (Czech Republic) P Rikl	6	2	[9]
(Australia) M Polmans (Poland) J Zieliński	2	6	[11]
4	(United States) A Krajicek (Croatia) N Mektić	5	7^{8}	[10]
PR	(Czech Republic) P Nouza (New Zealand) M Venus	7	6^{6}	[7]
(United States) R Galloway (Sweden) A Göransson	5	4
(Chile) A Tabilo (France) L Van Assche	7	6
(Italy) L Darderi (Argentina) TM Etcheverry	6	5	[10]
WC	(Australia) R Hijikata (Japan) K Uesugi	4	7	[12]
Q	(United Kingdom) D Stevenson (United Kingdom) M Willis	2	4
3	(Monaco) H Nys (France) É Roger-Vasselin	6	6
(Austria) L Miedler (Austria) N Oberleitner	6	7^{7}
(Belgium) A Blockx (United States) A Michelsen	4	6^{5}
LL	(Netherlands) J-J Rojer (United States) T Winegar	3	6	[8]
2	(France) T Arribagé (France) A Olivetti	6	3	[10]

Quarterfinals
1	(Italy) S Bolelli (Italy) A Vavassori	6	6
(Australia) M Polmans (Poland) J Zieliński	3	4
4	(United States) A Krajicek (Croatia) N Mektić	7^{7}	7^{7}
(Chile) A Tabilo (France) L Van Assche	6^{2}	6^{3}
WC	(Australia) R Hijikata (Japan) K Uesugi	6	6
3	(Monaco) H Nys (France) É Roger-Vasselin	4	4
(Austria) L Miedler (Austria) N Oberleitner	4	6^{3}
2	(France) T Arribagé (France) A Olivetti	6	7^{7}

Semifinals
1	(Italy) S Bolelli (Italy) A Vavassori	5	6^{3}
4	(United States) A Krajicek (Croatia) N Mektić	7	7^{7}
WC	(Australia) R Hijikata (Japan) K Uesugi	6	4	[10]
2	(France) T Arribagé (France) A Olivetti	4	6	[12]

Final
4	(United States) A Krajicek (Croatia) N Mektić	7^{7}	5	[10]
2	(France) T Arribagé (France) A Olivetti	6^{5}	7	[6]

== Qualifying ==
=== Seeds ===
1. (Netherlands) Jean-Julien Rojer / (United States) Theodore Winegar (qualifying competition, lucky losers)
2. (United Kingdom) David Stevenson / (United Kingdom) Marcus Willis (qualified)

=== Qualifiers ===
1. (United Kingdom) David Stevenson / (United Kingdom) Marcus Willis

=== Lucky losers ===
1. (Netherlands) Jean-Julien Rojer / (United States) Theodore Winegar

=== Qualifying draw ===
First round
1	(Netherlands) Jean-Julien Rojer (United States) Theodore Winegar	3	6	[10]
WC	(Japan) Rei Sakamoto (Japan) Sho Shimabukuro	6	3	[4]
(Mexico) Santiago González (Germany) Hendrik Jebens	6^{4}	4
2	(United Kingdom) David Stevenson (United Kingdom) Marcus Willis	7^{7}	6

Qualifying competition
1	(Netherlands) Jean-Julien Rojer (United States) Theodore Winegar	4	6	[8]
2	(United Kingdom) David Stevenson (United Kingdom) Marcus Willis	6	2	[10]
