= 2026 Japan Open Tennis Championships – Singles =

Singles
- 2026 Japan Open Tennis Championships

Final
- Champion: (Spain) Carlos Alcaraz
- Runner-up: (Czech Republic) Jiří Lehečka
- Score: 7–6^{(7–4)}, 6–4

Details
- Draw: 32 (4Q / 3WC)
- Seeds: 8

Events
Singles	Doubles
- Japan Open

At the 2026 Japan Open Tennis Championships, defending champion Carlos Alcaraz defeated Jiří Lehečka in the final, 7–6^{(7–4)}, 6–4 to win the men's singles tennis title. The event took place on outdoor hard courts in Tokyo, Japan, and was an ATP 500 level tournament. It was Alcaraz's first title following a four-month layoff due to a wrist injury. Alcaraz was the first player to defend the Japan Open title since Pete Sampras in 1994.

This tournament marked the final professional appearance of 2014 US Open finalist, 2016 Olympic bronze medalist, and former world No. 4 Kei Nishikori. He lost in the first round to Frances Tiafoe.

== Seeds ==
1. (Spain) Carlos Alcaraz (champion)
2. (United States) Frances Tiafoe (second round)
3. (United States) Taylor Fritz (first round)
4. (Spain) Rafael Jódar (first round)
5. (United States) Brandon Nakashima (first round)
6. (Norway) Casper Ruud (first round)
7. (United States) Tommy Paul (first round)
8. (Monaco) Valentin Vacherot (semifinals)

== Draw ==
Key

- Q = Qualifier
- WC = Wild card
- LL = Lucky loser
- Alt = Alternate
- ITF = ITF entry
- PR = Protected ranking
- SR = Special ranking
- SE = Special exempt
- JE = Junior exempt
- JR = Junior Accelerator Programme entrant
- CO = College Accelerator Programme entrant
- NG = Next Gen Accelerator Program entrant
- w/o = Walkover
- r = Retired
- d = Defaulted

=== Finals ===
Semifinals
1	(Spain) Carlos Alcaraz	5	6	6
Q	(Spain) Jaume Munar	7	3	1
(Czech Republic) Jiří Lehečka	6	6
8	(Monaco) Valentin Vacherot	4	2

Final
1	(Spain) Carlos Alcaraz	7^{7}	6
(Czech Republic) Jiří Lehečka	6^{4}	4

=== Top half ===
First round
1	(Spain) C Alcaraz	7^{7}	4	6
(United States) A Michelsen	6^{1}	6	1
(Italy) M Arnaldi	2	6	6
WC	(Japan) R Sakamoto	6	4	4
(Canada) D Shapovalov	7	6
WC	(Japan) S Shimabukuro	5	1
(Chile) A Tabilo	6	6
7	(United States) T Paul	1	2
3	(United States) T Fritz	7^{9}	4	3
Q	(Spain) J Munar	6^{7}	6	6
LL	(Portugal) J Faria	6	3	6
(United Kingdom) A Fery	4	6	4
(Denmark) H Rune	3	1
SE	(France) K Jacquet	6	6
(Italy) L Darderi	7^{7}	6
6	(Norway) C Ruud	6^{3}	3

Second round
1	(Spain) C Alcaraz	7^{8}	6
(Italy) M Arnaldi	6^{6}	1
(Canada) D Shapovalov	7	3	6
(Chile) A Tabilo	5	6	4
Q	(Spain) J Munar	6	6
LL	(Portugal) J Faria	1	1
SE	(France) K Jacquet	6	7^{7}
(Italy) L Darderi	3	6^{5}

Quarterfinals
1	(Spain) C Alcaraz	7^{7}	2
(Canada) D Shapovalov	6^{3}	1^{r}
Q	(Spain) J Munar	6	6
SE	(France) K Jacquet	4	2

Semifinals
1	(Spain) C Alcaraz	5	6	6
Q	(Spain) J Munar	7	3	1

=== Bottom half ===
First round
5	(United States) B Nakashima	3	2
(France) U Humbert	6	6
(Czech Republic) J Lehečka	6	6^{3}	6
(Belgium) Z Bergs	3	7^{7}	3
(Spain) A Davidovich Fokina	6	6^{1}	4
(Italy) M Berrettini	1	7^{7}	6
Q	(Paraguay) AD Vallejo	6	6
4	(Spain) R Jódar	1	3
8	(Monaco) V Vacherot	7^{7}	7^{7}
(Belgium) A Blockx	6^{2}	6^{4}
(Argentina) TM Etcheverry	6	3	4
Q	(Greece) S Tsitsipas	4	6	6
Q	(France) A Fils	6	6
(France) L Van Assche	3	2
WC	(Japan) K Nishikori	4	4
2	(United States) F Tiafoe	6	6

Second round
(France) U Humbert	7	4	4
(Czech Republic) J Lehečka	5	6	6
(Italy) M Berrettini	6^{6}	1
Q	(Paraguay) AD Vallejo	7^{8}	6
8	(Monaco) V Vacherot	4	7^{7}	6
Q	(Greece) S Tsitsipas	6	6^{5}	4
Q	(France) A Fils	6	7
2	(United States) F Tiafoe	3	5

Quarterfinals
(Czech Republic) J Lehečka	6	6
Q	(Paraguay) AD Vallejo	1	1
8	(Monaco) V Vacherot	7	4	6
Q	(France) A Fils	5	6	4

Semifinals
(Czech Republic) J Lehečka	6	6
8	(Monaco) V Vacherot	4	2

== Qualifying ==
=== Seeds ===
1. (France) Arthur Fils (qualified)
2. (Greece) Stefanos Tsitsipas (qualified)
3. (Paraguay) Adolfo Daniel Vallejo (qualified)
4. (Spain) Jaume Munar (qualified)
5. (Portugal) Jaime Faria (qualifying competition, lucky loser)
6. (Poland) Kamil Majchrzak (qualifying competition)
7. (Argentina) Camilo Ugo Carabelli (first round)
8. (United States) Aleksandar Kovacevic (qualifying competition)

=== Qualifiers ===
1. (France) Arthur Fils
2. (Greece) Stefanos Tsitsipas
3. (Paraguay) Adolfo Daniel Vallejo
4. (Spain) Jaume Munar

=== Lucky loser ===
1. (Portugal) Jaime Faria

=== Qualifying draw ===
==== First qualifier ====
First round
1	(France) Arthur Fils	2	6	6
(United States) Martin Damm	6	1	1
(Italy) Lorenzo Sonego	5	2
6	(Poland) Kamil Majchrzak	7	6

Qualifying competition
1	(France) Arthur Fils	6	3	6
6	(Poland) Kamil Majchrzak	2	6	1

==== Second qualifier ====
First round
2/Alt	(Greece) Stefanos Tsitsipas	7	6
WC	(Japan) Yoshihito Nishioka	5	2
(Australia) Rinky Hijikata	6	6
7	(Argentina) Camilo Ugo Carabelli	2	3

Qualifying competition
2/Alt	(Greece) Stefanos Tsitsipas	6	6
(Australia) Rinky Hijikata	4	3

==== Third qualifier ====
First round
3	(Paraguay) Adolfo Daniel Vallejo	6	6
WC	(Japan) Taro Daniel	3	2
WC	(Japan) Shintaro Mochizuki	2	4
5	(Portugal) Jaime Faria	6	6

Qualifying competition
3	(Paraguay) Adolfo Daniel Vallejo	6	5	7
5	(Portugal) Jaime Faria	4	7	5

==== Fourth qualifier ====
First round
4	(Spain) Jaume Munar	5	6	6
(United States) Marcos Giron	7	1	4
(United States) Zachary Svajda	7^{9}	2	4
8	(United States) Aleksandar Kovacevic	6^{7}	6	6

Qualifying competition
4	(Spain) Jaume Munar	6	6
8	(United States) Aleksandar Kovacevic	2	3
