= 2026 Japan Open Tennis Championships =

- Date: 30 September–6 October
- Edition: 52nd
- Category: ATP 500
- Draw: 32S/16D
- Surface: Hard / outdoor
- Location: Tokyo, Japan
- Venue: Ariake Coliseum

Champions

Singles
- (Spain) Carlos Alcaraz

Doubles
- (United States) Austin Krajicek / (Croatia) Nikola Mektić
- Japan Open

The 2026 Kinoshita Group Japan Open Tennis Championships was a men's tennis tournament played on outdoor hardcourts. It was the 52nd edition of the Japan Open, and an ATP 500 tournament on the 2026 ATP Tour. It was held at the Ariake Coliseum in Tokyo, Japan, from 30 September to 6 October 2026.

== Champions ==
=== Singles ===
- (Spain) Carlos Alcaraz def. (Czech Republic) Jiří Lehečka, 7–6^{(7–4)}, 6–4

=== Doubles ===
- (United States) Austin Krajicek / (Croatia) Nikola Mektić def. (France) Théo Arribagé / (France) Albano Olivetti, 7–6^{(7–5)}, 5–7, [10–6]

== Singles main-draw entrants ==
=== Seeds ===
Country	Player	Rank^{1}	Seed
ESP	Carlos Alcaraz	3	1
USA	Frances Tiafoe	8	2
USA	Taylor Fritz	10	3
ESP	Rafael Jódar	14	4
USA	Brandon Nakashima	16	5
NOR	Casper Ruud	17	6
USA	Tommy Paul	18	7
MON	Valentin Vacherot	19	8

- ^{1} Rankings are as of 21 September 2026.

=== Other entrants ===
The following players received wildcards into the singles main draw:

- (Japan) Kei Nishikori
- (Japan) Rei Sakamoto
- (Japan) Sho Shimabukuro

The following player used a special exempt into the singles main draw:

- (France) Kyrian Jacquet

The following players received entry from the qualifying draw:

- (France) Arthur Fils
- (Spain) Jaume Munar
- (Greece) Stefanos Tsitsipas
- (Paraguay) Adolfo Daniel Vallejo

The following player received entry as a lucky loser:

- (Portugal) Jaime Faria

=== Withdrawals ===
- (Brazil) João Fonseca → replaced by (France) Luca Van Assche
- (Italy) Lorenzo Musetti → replaced by (Portugal) Jaime Faria
- (United States) Ben Shelton → replaced by (United States) Alex Michelsen

== Doubles main-draw entrants ==
=== Seeds ===
Country	Player	Country	Player	Rank^{1}	Seed
ITA	Simone Bolelli	ITA	Andrea Vavassori	23	1
FRA	Théo Arribagé	FRA	Albano Olivetti	39	2
MON	Hugo Nys	FRA	Édouard Roger-Vasselin	45	3
USA	Austin Krajicek	CRO	Nikola Mektić	55	4

- Rankings are as of 21 September 2026.

=== Other entrants ===
The following pairs received wildcards into the doubles main draw:

- (Australia) Rinky Hijikata / (Japan) Kaito Uesugi
- (Japan) Shintaro Mochizuki / (Japan) Seita Watanabe

The following pair received entry using a protected ranking:

- (Czech Republic) Petr Nouza / (New Zealand) Michael Venus

The following pair received entry from the qualifying draw:

- (United Kingdom) David Stevenson / (United Kingdom) Marcus Willis

The following pair received entry as lucky losers:

- (Netherlands) Jean-Julien Rojer / (United States) Theodore Winegar

=== Withdrawals ===
- (United States) Evan King / (United States) Brandon Nakashima → replaced by (Netherlands) Jean-Julien Rojer / (United States) Theodore Winegar
