= 2026 French Open =

2026 tennis tournament held in Paris, France

- Date: 24 May – 7 June 2026
- Edition: 125th
- Category: Grand Slam
- Prize money: €61,723,000
- Surface: Clay
- Location: Paris (XVI^{e}), France
- Venue: Roland Garros Stadium

Champions

Men's singles
- (Germany) Alexander Zverev

Women's singles
- Mirra Andreeva

Men's doubles
- (Spain) Marcel Granollers / (Argentina) Horacio Zeballos

Women's doubles
- (Czech Republic) Kateřina Siniaková / (United States) Taylor Townsend

Mixed doubles
- (Italy) Sara Errani / (Italy) Andrea Vavassori

Wheelchair men's singles
- (Japan) Tokito Oda

Wheelchair women's singles
- (Netherlands) Diede de Groot

Wheelchair quad singles
- (Netherlands) Niels Vink

Wheelchair men's doubles
- (United Kingdom) Alfie Hewett / (United Kingdom) Gordon Reid

Wheelchair women's doubles
- (Japan) Yui Kamiji / (China) Zhu Zhenzhen

Wheelchair quad doubles
- (Israel) Guy Sasson / (Netherlands) Niels Vink

Boys' singles
- (Brazil) Luís Guto Miguel

Girls' singles
- Alisa Oktiabreva

Boys' doubles
- (Germany) Jamie Mackenzie / (Germany) Vincent Reisach

Girls' doubles
- (Czech Republic) Jana Kovačková / (Czech Republic) Kateřina Zajíčková

Wheelchair boys' singles
- (United Kingdom) Matthew Knoesen

Wheelchair girls' singles
- (Belgium) Luna Gryp

Wheelchair boys' doubles
- (United Kingdom) Matthew Knoesen / (Belgium) Alexander Lantermann

Wheelchair girls' doubles
- (Belgium) Luna Gryp / (Japan) Seira Matsuoka
- French Open

The 2026 French Open was a Grand Slam tennis tournament held at the Stade Roland Garros in Paris, France from 24 May to 7 June 2026.

Alexander Zverev defeated Flavio Cobolli in five sets for his first major title in his fourth final. In doing so, he became the first German to win a men's major singles championship since Boris Becker in 1996, and the first player other than Jannik Sinner or Carlos Alcaraz to win a slam since 2023.

In the women's draw, Mirra Andreeva defeated Maja Chwalińska in straight sets, becoming the fourth Russian tennis woman player to achieve the trophy, behind of Anastasia Myskina in 2004, Svetlana Kuznetsova in 2009 and Maria Sharapova, who won the tournament twice in 2012 and 2014. No former major winners reached the semifinals of either the men's or women's singles events.

The 2026 French Open retained the use of human line judges, unlike the other Grand Slam tournaments which had shifted to electronic line calling. Starting at the 2026 French Open, the Grand Slams permitted the use of connected devices by players for the first time, such as the Whoop bands, allowing players access to a broader range of performance-related information during competition.

Two-time reigning men's singles champion Carlos Alcaraz did not defend his title, as he withdrew before the start of the tournament due to a wrist injury. Coco Gauff was the defending champion in women's singles but lost in the third round to Anastasia Potapova.

The women's doubles defending champions pair, Jasmine Paolini and Sara Errani, did not defend their title together, as Paolini decided to only play at the singles draw of this edition, due to a foot injury, leaving Errani to play alongside Lilli Tagger. Errani and Tagger lost in the second round to Demi Schuurs and Ellen Perez.

Horacio Zeballos and Marcel Granollers, the defending champions pair on the men's doubles draw, successfully defended their title by defeating Harri Heliovaara and Henry Patten in two sets at the final and without dropping a single set throughout their campaign.

Diede de Groot won her sixth French Open title on wheelchair women's singles after defeating Ksenia Chasteau in two sets at the final, which also marked the sixth time she achieved the singles career slam.

== Special events ==
The French Open tournament commemorated its heritage, history, and past champions during the 2026 edition through a series of official tributes and ceremonies.

A ceremony honoring Caroline Garcia took place on Court Philippe-Chatrier on 4 June 2026, between the women’s singles semifinals. Garcia, a former world No. 4, concluded her professional career in 2025 after 19 seasons on the tour.

In addition, a tribute was organized on 26 May 2026 to mark the 70th anniversary of Althea Gibson’s victory at the 1956 French Championships. By winning the singles title, Gibson became the first woman of color to claim a Grand Slam singles championship.

On the men's side, Stan Wawrinka—the 2015 champion and 2017 finalist— competed in his 21st and final appearance at Roland-Garros in 2026. Tournament organizers honored him following his last match at Porte d’Auteuil, which was a defeat to Jesper De Jong on the first round, held on 25 May. The tribute included a video showing moments of Wawrinka's career, specifically those at the French Open, and followed with a speech by Wawrinka, a presentation of a custom trophy, and a video with words from active and retired tennis players, such as Carlos Alcaraz, Gaël Monfils, Roger Federer, Jannik Sinner, Rafael Nadal, Novak Djokovic and others.

Later, on that same day, Gaël Monfils made his final appearance at the tournament. A formal tribute was held on court after his last match, which was a defeat on the first round to compatriot Hugo Gaston. The tribute consisted of a video showing moments of Monfils at the French Open across his career, and later also included a speech by him. A custom trophy was also given to Monfils. At the end, a video containing words from various active and former tennis players, such as Richard Gasquet, Stan Wawrinka, Roger Federer, Amelie Mauresmo, Arthur Fils, Rafael Nadal, Novak Djokovic and others, was shown, followed by a on court appearance from Jo-Wilfried Tsonga and Richard Gasquet, to honor Monfils in person.

=== Gael and friends ===
Monfils also headlined a special exhibition event on 21 May 2026 at Court Philippe-Chatrier, featuring appearances by current and former players, as well as figures from outside the sport, such as Jannik Sinner, Maria Sakkari, Novak Djokovic, Alexander Zverev, Belinda Bencic, Elina Svitolina, Naomi Osaka and others.

The event, called "Gael and friends", was organized in a celebratory format and included an exhibition tennis tournament in a mixed doubles format with custom rules, which Monfils was the winner, playing alongside his wife Elina Svitolina. It also featured entertainment segments, featuring names such as DJ Martin Solveig, singer Matt Pokora and comedian Paul de Saint Sernin. The event ended with a Q&A segment with Monfils and messages from his fans, friends and family.

Proceeds from this event were donated to several charitable organisations, including the French Tennis Federation’s fundraising foundation, Terre d’Impact, as well as partner charities such as KELINA, founded by Flora Coquerel, and the Epic Foundation.

== Singles players ==
- Men's singles

Men's singles players
Champion		Runner-up	
(Germany) Alexander Zverev [2]		(Italy) Flavio Cobolli [10]	
Semifinals out
(Italy) Matteo Arnaldi		(Czech Republic) Jakub Menšík [26]	
Quarterfinals out
(Italy) Matteo Berrettini	(Canada) Félix Auger-Aliassime [4]	(Brazil) João Fonseca [28]	(Spain) Rafael Jódar [27]
4th round out
(Argentina) Juan Manuel Cerúndolo	(United States) Frances Tiafoe [19]	(Chile) Alejandro Tabilo	(United States) Zachary Svajda
Andrey Rublev [11]	(Norway) Casper Ruud [15]	(Spain) Pablo Carreño Busta	(Netherlands) Jesper de Jong (LL)
3rd round out
(Spain) Martín Landaluce	(Argentina) Francisco Comesaña	(Portugal) Jaime Faria (Q)	(Belgium) Raphaël Collignon
(United States) Brandon Nakashima [31]	(France) Moïse Kouamé (WC)	(United States) Learner Tien [18]	(Argentina) Francisco Cerúndolo [25]
(Australia) Alex de Minaur [8]	(Portugal) Nuno Borges	(United States) Tommy Paul [24]	(Serbia) Novak Djokovic [3]
(United States) Alex Michelsen	(Argentina) Thiago Agustín Tirante	Karen Khachanov [13]	(France) Quentin Halys
2nd round out
(Italy) Jannik Sinner [1]	(Czech Republic) Vít Kopřiva	(France) Arthur Rinderknech [22]	(Italy) Luciano Darderi [14]
(Germany) Jan-Lennard Struff	(Poland) Hubert Hurkacz	(Greece) Stefanos Tsitsipas	(United States) Ben Shelton [5]
(Argentina) Román Andrés Burruchaga	(France) Luca Van Assche	(Paraguay) Adolfo Daniel Vallejo	(Monaco) Valentin Vacherot [16]
(China) Wu Yibing	(Argentina) Facundo Díaz Acosta (Q)	(France) Hugo Gaston (WC)	(Australia) Adam Walton (WC)
(Belgium) Alexander Blockx	(Argentina) Mariano Navone	(Serbia) Miomir Kecmanović	(Argentina) Camilo Ugo Carabelli
(Serbia) Hamad Medjedovic	(Italy) Lorenzo Sonego	(Croatia) Dino Prižmić	(France) Valentin Royer
(United States) Nishesh Basavareddy (WC)	(Australia) James Duckworth	(Spain) Alejandro Davidovich Fokina [21]	(Australia) Thanasi Kokkinakis (PR)
(Argentina) Marco Trungelliti	(Italy) Federico Cinà (Q)	(France) Ugo Humbert [32]	(Czech Republic) Tomáš Macháč
1st round out
(France) Clément Tabur (WC)	(United Kingdom) Jacob Fearnley	(Bolivia) Juan Carlos Prado Ángelo (Q)	(France) Corentin Moutet [30]
(Austria) Jurij Rodionov (Q)	(Hungary) Márton Fucsovics	(United States) Ethan Quinn	(Austria) Sebastian Ofner
(Kazakhstan) Alexander Bublik [9]	(Canada) Denis Shapovalov	(Spain) Jaume Munar	(United States) Eliot Spizzirri
(Netherlands) Tallon Griekspoor [29]	(France) Alexandre Müller	(Australia) Aleksandar Vukic	(Spain) Daniel Mérida
(Germany) Daniel Altmaier	(Argentina) Sebastián Báez	(Lithuania) Vilius Gaubas (LL)	(Spain) Roberto Bautista Agut
(United Kingdom) Cameron Norrie [20]	(Croatia) Marin Čilić	(Poland) Kamil Majchrzak	(France) Thomas Faurel (Q)
(Italy) Andrea Pellegrino (Q)	(United States) Marcos Giron	(China) Zhang Zhizhen (PR)	(Chile) Cristian Garín
(Netherlands) Botic van de Zandschulp	(France) Gaël Monfils (WC)	(Australia) Alexei Popyrin	Daniil Medvedev [6]
(United Kingdom) Toby Samuel (Q)	(Hong Kong) Coleman Wong (LL)	(United States) Jenson Brooksby	(France) Titouan Droguet (WC)
(Argentina) Tomás Martín Etcheverry [23]	(Hungary) Fábián Marozsán	(United States) Emilio Nava (Q)	(Peru) Ignacio Buse
Roman Safiullin (Q)	(Germany) Yannick Hanfmann	(France) Pierre-Hugues Herbert (Q)	(Australia) Rinky Hijikata
(France) Luka Pavlovic (Q)	(United States) Michael Zheng (Q)	(Bolivia) Hugo Dellien (Q)	(France) Giovanni Mpetshi Perricard
(United States) Taylor Fritz [7]	(Kazakhstan) Alexander Shevchenko	(Canada) Gabriel Diallo	(United States) Aleksandar Kovacevic
(Bosnia and Herzegovina) Damir Džumhur	(Spain) Pablo Llamas Ruiz (Q)	(France) Térence Atmane	(Czech Republic) Jiří Lehečka [12]
(France) Arthur Géa (WC)	(France) Kyrian Jacquet (Q)	(United States) Reilly Opelka	(Switzerland) Stan Wawrinka
(France) Adrian Mannarino	(Italy) Mattia Bellucci	(Belgium) Zizou Bergs	(France) Benjamin Bonzi

- Women's singles

Women's singles players
Champion		Runner-up	
Mirra Andreeva [8]		(Poland) Maja Chwalińska (Q)	
Semifinals out
Diana Shnaider [25]		(Ukraine) Marta Kostyuk [15]	
Quarterfinals out
Aryna Sabalenka [1]	Anna Kalinskaya [22]	(Ukraine) Elina Svitolina [7]	(Romania) Sorana Cîrstea [18]
4th round out
(Japan) Naomi Osaka [16]	(United States) Madison Keys [19]	(Austria) Anastasia Potapova [28]	(France) Diane Parry
(Switzerland) Belinda Bencic [11]	(Poland) Iga Świątek [3]	(Switzerland) Jil Teichmann (PR)	(China) Wang Xiyu (Q)
3rd round out
(Australia) Daria Kasatkina	(United States) Iva Jovic [17]	(Canada) Victoria Mboko [9]	(Ukraine) Oleksandra Oliynykova
(United States) Coco Gauff [4]	(Colombia) Camila Osorio	(Greece) Maria Sakkari	(United States) Amanda Anisimova [6]
(Germany) Tamara Korpatsch	(United States) Peyton Stearns	(Switzerland) Viktorija Golubic	(Poland) Magda Linette
(Czech Republic) Marie Bouzková [27]	(Czech Republic) Karolína Muchová [10]	(Argentina) Solana Sierra	(Ukraine) Yuliia Starodubtseva
2nd round out
(France) Elsa Jacquemot	(Switzerland) Susan Bandecchi (Q)	(United States) Emma Navarro	(Croatia) Donna Vekić
(Czech Republic) Kateřina Siniaková	(Croatia) Antonia Ružić	(United States) McCartney Kessler	(Australia) Kimberly Birrell
(Egypt) Mayar Sherif (Q)	(United Kingdom) Katie Boulter	Alina Korneeva (Q)	(Kazakhstan) Yulia Putintseva
(United States) Claire Liu (Q)	(Belgium) Elise Mertens [23]	(United States) Ann Li [30]	(Austria) Julia Grabher
(Spain) Kaitlin Quevedo (Q)	(China) Wang Xinyu [32]	(Ukraine) Daria Snigur	(United States) Caty McNally
(United States) Katie Volynets	(United States) Alycia Parks	(Latvia) Jeļena Ostapenko [29]	(Czech Republic) Sára Bejlek
(Spain) Marina Bassols Ribera (Q)	(United Kingdom) Francesca Jones	(Poland) Magdalena Fręch	(Uzbekistan) Kamilla Rakhimova
(Italy) Jasmine Paolini [13]	(Germany) Eva Lys	(United States) Hailey Baptiste [26]	(Kazakhstan) Elena Rybakina [2]
1st round out
(Spain) Jéssica Bouzas Maneiro	(Czech Republic) Linda Fruhvirtová (Q)	(Turkey) Zeynep Sönmez	(Spain) Cristina Bucșa [31]
(Philippines) Alexandra Eala	(Indonesia) Janice Tjen	(France) Alice Tubello (WC)	(Germany) Laura Siegemund
(Czech Republic) Nikola Bartůňková	(Switzerland) Simona Waltert	(United States) Ashlyn Krueger (Q)	(Belgium) Hanne Vandewinkel
(Mexico) Renata Zarazúa	(China) Guo Hanyu (Q)	Elena Pridankina (Q)	(United States) Jessica Pegula [5]
(United States) Taylor Townsend	(Hungary) Dalma Gálfi	(United States) Akasha Urhobo (WC)	(Australia) Maya Joint
(France) Loïs Boisson	(Italy) Elisabetta Cocciaretto	(Australia) Talia Gibson	Ekaterina Alexandrova [14]
(Czech Republic) Linda Nosková [12]	(Japan) Moyuka Uchijima	(China) Zheng Qinwen	(Germany) Tatjana Maria
(China) Zhang Shuai	(Ukraine) Anhelina Kalinina (PR)	(Slovakia) Rebecca Šramková (Q)	(France) Tiantsoa Rakotomanga Rajaonah (WC)
(Hungary) Anna Bondár	(France) Léolia Jeanjean (WC)	(Spain) Sara Sorribes Tormo (PR)	(Austria) Lilli Tagger
(Denmark) Clara Tauson [21]	(United States) Sofia Kenin	(Australia) Ajla Tomljanović	(Austria) Sinja Kraus (Q)
(Spain) Oksana Selekhmeteva	(France) Clara Burel (WC)	(Hungary) Panna Udvardy	(Canada) Leylah Fernandez [24]
(Germany) Ella Seidel	(Czech Republic) Tereza Valentová	(United States) Sloane Stephens (Q)	(Australia) Emerson Jones (WC)
(France) Fiona Ferro (WC)	(Colombia) Emiliana Arango	(Brazil) Beatriz Haddad Maia	(Italy) Lucia Bronzetti (Q)
Liudmila Samsonova [20]	(Romania) Elena-Gabriela Ruse	(Romania) Jaqueline Cristian	Anastasia Zakharova
(Ukraine) Dayana Yastremska	(United Kingdom) Emma Raducanu	(Croatia) Petra Marčinko	(France) Ksenia Efremova (WC)
(Czech Republic) Barbora Krejčíková	(Montenegro) Danka Kovinić (PR)	Anna Blinkova	(Slovenia) Veronika Erjavec

== Events ==
=== Men's singles ===
- (Germany) Alexander Zverev defeated (Italy) Flavio Cobolli, 6–1, 4–6, 6–4, 6–7^{(5–7)}, 6–1

=== Women's singles ===
- Mirra Andreeva defeated (Poland) Maja Chwalińska, 6–3, 6–2

=== Men's doubles ===
- (Spain) Marcel Granollers / (Argentina) Horacio Zeballos defeated (Finland) Harri Heliövaara / (United Kingdom) Henry Patten, 6–4, 6–2

=== Women's doubles ===
- (Czech Republic) Kateřina Siniaková / (United States) Taylor Townsend defeated (Kazakhstan) Anna Danilina / (Serbia) Aleksandra Krunić, 6–2, 7–5

=== Mixed doubles ===
- (Italy) Sara Errani / (Italy) Andrea Vavassori defeated (Canada) Gabriela Dabrowski / (United States) Evan King, 4–6, 6–3, [10–4]

=== Wheelchair men's singles ===
- (Japan) Tokito Oda defeated (United Kingdom) Alfie Hewett, 6–3, 6–3

=== Wheelchair women's singles ===
- (Netherlands) Diede de Groot defeated (France) Ksénia Chasteau, 6–1, 6–0

=== Wheelchair quad singles ===
- (Netherlands) Niels Vink defeated (Turkey) Ahmet Kaplan, 6–3, 6–4

=== Wheelchair men's doubles ===
- (United Kingdom) Alfie Hewett / (United Kingdom) Gordon Reid defeated (Spain) Martín de la Puente / (France) Stéphane Houdet, 6–2, 6–3

=== Wheelchair women's doubles ===
- (Japan) Yui Kamiji / (China) Zhu Zhenzhen defeated (Netherlands) Jinte Bos / (Netherlands) Lizzy de Greef, 6–3, 6–0

=== Wheelchair quad doubles ===
- (Israel) Guy Sasson / (Netherlands) Niels Vink defeated (Netherlands) Sam Schröder / (Australia) Jin Woodman, 6–4, 6–3

=== Boys' singles ===
- (Brazil) Luís Guto Miguel defeated (United States) Michael Antonius, 6–3, 6–4

=== Girls' singles ===
- Alisa Oktiabreva defeated (China) Sun Xinran, 6–2, 6–1

=== Boys' doubles ===
- (Germany) Jamie Mackenzie / (Germany) Vincent Reisach defeated (France) Mathys Domenc / (France) Daniel Jade, 6–1, 6–4

=== Girls' doubles ===
- (Czech Republic) Jana Kovačková / (Czech Republic) Kateřina Zajíčková defeated (United States) Jordyn Hazelitt / (United States) Welles Newman, 6–1, 6–4

=== Wheelchair boys' singles ===
- (United Kingdom) Matthew Knoesen defeated (Belgium) Alexander Lantermann, 7–6^{(7–4)}, 6–4

=== Wheelchair girls' singles ===
- (Belgium) Luna Gryp defeated (Japan) Seira Matsuoka, 6–2, 6–2

=== Wheelchair boys' doubles ===
- (United Kingdom) Matthew Knoesen / (Belgium) Alexander Lantermann defeated (United Kingdom) Will Barton / (United Kingdom) Lucas John De Gouveia, 6–4, 6–3

=== Wheelchair girls' doubles ===
- (Belgium) Luna Gryp / (Japan) Seira Matsuoka defeated (United States) Lucy Heald / (Colombia) Paula Michelle Lopez Meza, 6–4, 6–2

== Point distribution and prize money ==
=== Point distribution ===
Below is a series of tables for each competition showing the ranking points offered for each event.

==== Senior points ====
Event	W	F	SF	QF	Round of 16	Round of 32	Round of 64	Round of 128	Q	Q3	Q2	Q1
Men's singles	2000	1300	800	400	200	100	50	10	30	16	8	0
Men's doubles	2000	1200	720	360	180	90	0	N/A				
Women's singles	2000	1300	780	430	240	130	70	10	40	30	20	2
Women's doubles	2000	1300	780	430	240	130	10	N/A				

==== Wheelchair points ====
Event	W	F	SF	QF	Round of 16
Singles	800	500	375	200	100
Doubles	800	500	375	100	N/A
Quad singles	800	500	375	200	100
Quad doubles	800	500	375	100	N/A

==== Junior points ====
Event	W	F	SF	QF	Round of 16	Round of 32	Q	Q3
Boys' singles	1000	700	490	300	180	90	25	20
Girls' singles	1000	700	490	300	180	90	25	20
Boys' doubles	750	525	367	225	135	N/A		
Girls' doubles	750	525	367	225	135	N/A		

=== Prize money ===
The French Open announced a total prize fund of €61.723 million for the 2026 edition, representing an increase of 9.53% compared to the previous year.

Tournament organizers confirmed the continuation of financial support for the qualifying competition, aimed at assisting players in covering seasonal expenses and maintaining their professional structures. The total prize money allocated to the qualifying rounds increased by 12.9%.

Prize money for the main draw rose by 10.1% compared to 2025, with a notable emphasis on the early stages of the singles competition. The first three rounds saw increases ranging between 11.11% and 11.54%. In addition, all remaining rounds of the main draw experienced increases between 6.82% and 9.80%.

Prize money for the doubles events—including men’s, women’s, and mixed competitions—was increased by 3.90% compared to the previous year.

The total prize money allocated to wheelchair and quad tennis events reached €1,018,500, marking an increase of 14.55% compared to 2025.

Event	Winner	Finalist	Semifinals	Quarterfinals	Round of 16	Round of 32	Round of 64	Round of 128	Q3	Q2	Q1
Singles	€2,800,000	€1,400,000	€750,000	€470,000	€285,000	€187,000	€130,000	€87,000	€48,000	€33,000	€24,000
Doubles^{1}	€600,000	€300,000	€150,000	€82,000	€45,000	€29,000	€19,000	—N/a	—N/a	—N/a	—N/a
Mixed doubles^{1}	€122,000	€61,000	€31,000	€17,500	€10,000	€5,000	—N/a	—N/a	—N/a	—N/a	—N/a
Wheelchair singles	€68,000	€35,000	€24,000	€15,000	€11,000	—N/a	—N/a	—N/a	—N/a	—N/a	—N/a
Wheelchair doubles^{1}	€22,000	€12,000	€9,000	€6,000	—N/a	—N/a	—N/a	—N/a	—N/a	—N/a	—N/a
Quad wheelchair singles	€68,000	€35,000	€24,000	€15,000	—N/a	—N/a	—N/a	—N/a	—N/a	—N/a	—N/a
Quad wheelchair doubles^{1}	€25,000	€12,500	€10,000	—N/a	—N/a	—N/a	—N/a	—N/a	—N/a	—N/a	—N/a

- ^{1} Prize money for doubles is per team.

Preceded by 2025 French Open	French Open	Succeeded by 2027 French Open
Preceded by 2026 Australian Open	Grand Slam events	Succeeded by 2026 Wimbledon Championships
