= 2026 Monte-Carlo Masters =

- Date: 5–12 April
- Edition: 119th
- Category: Masters 1000
- Draw: 56S / 28D
- Surface: Clay
- Location: Roquebrune-Cap-Martin, France (billed as Monte Carlo, Monaco)
- Venue: Monte Carlo Country Club

Champions

Singles
- (Italy) Jannik Sinner

Doubles
- (Germany) Kevin Krawietz / (Germany) Tim Pütz
- Monte-Carlo Masters

The 2026 Monte-Carlo Masters (also known as the Rolex Monte-Carlo Masters for sponsorship reasons) is a tennis tournament for male professionals currently played on outdoor clay courts. It is the 119th edition of the annual Monte Carlo Masters tournament, sponsored by Rolex for the 17th time. It is held at the Monte Carlo Country Club in Roquebrune-Cap-Martin, France (though billed as Monte Carlo, Monaco). The event is an ATP Masters 1000 tournament on the 2026 ATP Tour.

== Champions ==
=== Singles ===
- (Italy) Jannik Sinner def. (Spain) Carlos Alcaraz, 7–6^{(7–5)}, 6–3

=== Doubles ===
- (Germany) Kevin Krawietz / (Germany) Tim Pütz def. (El Salvador) Marcelo Arévalo / (Croatia) Mate Pavić, 4–6, 6–2, [10–8]

== Points ==
Because the Monte Carlo Masters is a non-mandatory Masters 1000 event, special rules regarding points distribution are in place. The Monte Carlo Masters counts as one of a player's 500 level tournaments, while distributing Masters 1000 points.

Event	W	F	SF	QF	Round of 16	Round of 32	Round of 64	Q	Q2	Q1
Singles	1,000	650	400	200	100	50	10	30	16	0
Doubles	1,000	600	360	180	90	0	—N/a	—N/a	—N/a	—N/a

=== Prize money ===
Event	W	F	SF	QF	Round of 16	Round of 32	Round of 64	Q2	Q1
Singles	€974,370	€532,120	€290,960	€158,700	€84,890	€45,520	€25,220	€12,920	€6,765
Doubles*	€298,950	€162,400	€89,210	€49,220	€27,050	€14,770	—N/a	—N/a	—N/a

_{*per team}

== Singles main draw entrants ==
=== Seeds ===
Country	Player	Rank^{1}	Seed
ESP	Carlos Alcaraz	1	1
ITA	Jannik Sinner	2	2
GER	Alexander Zverev	3	3
ITA	Lorenzo Musetti	5	4
AUS	Alex de Minaur	6	5
CAN	Félix Auger-Aliassime	7	6
	Daniil Medvedev	10	7
KAZ	Alexander Bublik	11	8
NOR	Casper Ruud	12	9
ITA	Flavio Cobolli	13	10
CZE	Jiří Lehečka	14	11
	Karen Khachanov	15	12
	Andrey Rublev	16	13
~~USA~~	~~Frances Tiafoe~~	~~18~~	~~14~~
ITA	Luciano Darderi	19	15
ARG	Francisco Cerúndolo	20	16

^{1} Rankings are as of 30 March 2026

=== Other entrants ===
The following players received wildcards into the main draw:

- (Italy) Matteo Berrettini
- (France) Moïse Kouamé
- (France) Gaël Monfils
- (Switzerland) Stan Wawrinka

The following player received entry using a protected ranking:

- (Poland) Hubert Hurkacz

The following players received entry via the qualifying draw:

- (Belgium) Alexander Blockx
- (Argentina) Juan Manuel Cerúndolo
- (Argentina) Francisco Comesaña
- (Chile) Cristian Garín
- (France) Alexandre Müller
- (United States) Emilio Nava
- (Kazakhstan) Alexander Shevchenko

The following players received entry as lucky losers:

- (Italy) Matteo Arnaldi
- (Spain) Roberto Bautista Agut
- (Bosnia and Herzegovina) Damir Džumhur
- (United States) Ethan Quinn

=== Withdrawals ===
- (Spain) Alejandro Davidovich Fokina → replaced by (Hungary) Márton Fucsovics
- (Serbia) Novak Djokovic → replaced by (Argentina) Sebastián Báez
- (United Kingdom) Jack Draper → replaced by (Germany) Daniel Altmaier
- (France) Arthur Fils → replaced by (Serbia) Miomir Kecmanović
- (United States) Taylor Fritz → replaced by (France) Térence Atmane
- (United States) Sebastian Korda → replaced by (Spain) Roberto Bautista Agut
- (Czech Republic) Jakub Menšík → replaced by (Bosnia and Herzegovina) Damir Džumhur
- (Spain) Jaume Munar → replaced by (United States) Ethan Quinn
- (United States) Frances Tiafoe → replaced by (Italy) Matteo Arnaldi

== Doubles main draw entrants ==
=== Seeds ===
Country	Player	Country	Player	Rank	Seed
ESP	Marcel Granollers	ARG	Horacio Zeballos	3	1
GBR	Julian Cash	GBR	Lloyd Glasspool	9	2
FIN	Harri Heliövaara	GBR	Henry Patten	12	3
USA	Christian Harrison	GBR	Neal Skupski	14	4
ESA	Marcelo Arévalo	CRO	Mate Pavić	18	5
GER	Kevin Krawietz	GER	Tim Pütz	25	6
POR	Francisco Cabral	GBR	Joe Salisbury	29	7
ARG	Guido Andreozzi	FRA	Manuel Guinard	36	8

^{1} Rankings are as of 30 March 2026.

=== Other entrants ===
The following pairs received wildcards into the doubles main draw:

- (Monaco) Romain Arneodo / (France) Pierre-Hugues Herbert
- (Italy) Matteo Berrettini / (Italy) Andrea Vavassori
- (Greece) Pavlos Tsitsipas / (Greece) Stefanos Tsitsipas

The following pair received entry as alternates:

- (United States) Austin Krajicek / (Croatia) Nikola Mektić

=== Withdrawals ===
- (Argentina) Francisco Cerúndolo / (Argentina) Tomás Martín Etcheverry → replaced by (United States) Austin Krajicek / (Croatia) Nikola Mektić
