= 2026 Coco Gauff tennis season =

Tennis season statistics

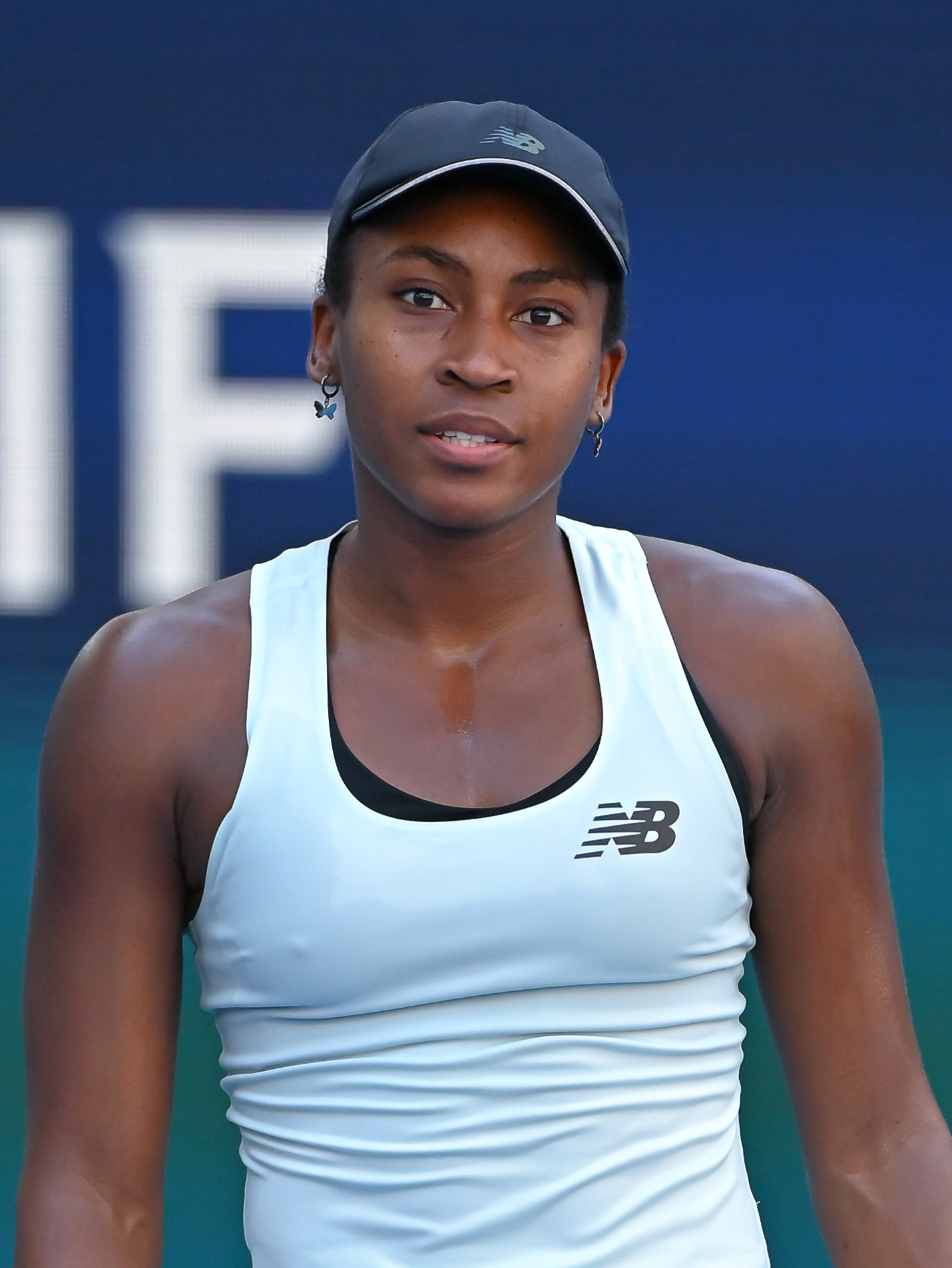
- Gauff at the 2026 Miami Open
- Country: United States
- Calendar prize money: $7,077,496

Singles
- Season record: 47–15 (76%)
- Calendar titles: 1
- Current ranking: No. 5
- Ranking change from previous year: ▼2

Grand Slam & significant results
- Australian Open: QF
- French Open: 3R
- Wimbledon: SF
- US Open: SF
- Championships: –

Doubles
- Season record: 5–3 (63%)
- Calendar titles: 0
- Current ranking: No. 143
- Ranking change from previous year: ▼127

Grand Slam doubles results
- Australian Open: A
- French Open: A
- Wimbledon: A
- US Open: A

Mixed doubles
- Season record: 3–1
- Last updated on: May 28, 2026.

The 2026 Coco Gauff tennis season officially began on January 3, 2026, with the start of the United Cup in Perth.

== All matches ==
This table chronicles all the matches of Coco Gauff in 2026.

Key
W	F	SF	QF	#R	RR	Q#	P#	DNQ	A	Z#	PO	G	S	B	NMS	NTI	P	NH

(W) winner; (F) finalist; (SF) semifinalist; (QF) quarterfinalist; (#R) rounds 4, 3, 2, 1; (RR) round-robin stage; (Q#) qualification round; (P#) preliminary round; (DNQ) did not qualify; (A) absent; (Z#) Davis/Fed Cup Zonal Group (with number indication) or (PO) play-off; (G) gold, (S) silver or (B) bronze Olympic/Paralympic medal; (NMS) not a Masters tournament; (NTI) not a Tier I tournament; (P) postponed; (NH) not held; (SR) strike rate (events won / competed); (W–L) win–loss record.
To avoid confusion and double counting, these charts are updated at the conclusion of a tournament or when the player's participation has ended.

=== Singles matches ===
Tournament	Match	Round	Opponent	Rank	Result	Score
United Cup; Perth/Sydney, Australia; WTA 500; Hard, outdoor; January 2, 2026 – January 11, 2026	1	RR	(Argentina) Solana Sierra (14)	66	Win	6–1, 6–1
United Cup; Perth/Sydney, Australia; WTA 500; Hard, outdoor; January 2, 2026 – January 11, 2026	2	RR	(Spain) Jéssica Bouzas Maneiro (10)	42	Loss	1–6, 7–6^{(7–3)}, 0–6
United Cup; Perth/Sydney, Australia; WTA 500; Hard, outdoor; January 2, 2026 – January 11, 2026	3	QF	(Greece) Maria Sakkari (12)	51	Win	6–3, 6–2
United Cup; Perth/Sydney, Australia; WTA 500; Hard, outdoor; January 2, 2026 – January 11, 2026	4	SF	(Poland) Iga Świątek (9)	2	Win	6–4, 6–2
Australian Open; Melbourne, Australia; Grand Slam; Hard, outdoor; January 18, 2026 – February 1, 2026	5	1R	(Uzbekistan) Kamilla Rakhimova	93	Win	6–2, 6–3
Australian Open; Melbourne, Australia; Grand Slam; Hard, outdoor; January 18, 2026 – February 1, 2026	6	2R	(Serbia) Olga Danilović	69	Win	6–2, 6–2
Australian Open; Melbourne, Australia; Grand Slam; Hard, outdoor; January 18, 2026 – February 1, 2026	7	3R	(United States) Hailey Baptiste	70	Win	3–6, 6–0, 6–3
Australian Open; Melbourne, Australia; Grand Slam; Hard, outdoor; January 18, 2026 – February 1, 2026	8	4R	(Czech Republic) Karolína Muchová (19)	19	Win	6–1, 3–6, 6–3
Australian Open; Melbourne, Australia; Grand Slam; Hard, outdoor; January 18, 2026 – February 1, 2026	9	QF	(Ukraine) Elina Svitolina (12)	12	Loss	1–6, 2–6
Qatar Open; Doha, Qatar; WTA 1000; Hard, outdoor; February 8, 2026 – February 14, 2026	–	1R	Bye			
Qatar Open; Doha, Qatar; WTA 1000; Hard, outdoor; February 8, 2026 – February 14, 2026	10	2R	(Italy) Elisabetta Cocciaretto (LL)	57	Loss	4–6, 2–6
Dubai Tennis Championships; Dubai, United Arab Emirates; WTA 1000; Hard, outdoor; February 15, 2026 – February 21, 2026	–	1R	Bye			
Dubai Tennis Championships; Dubai, United Arab Emirates; WTA 1000; Hard, outdoor; February 15, 2026 – February 21, 2026	11	2R	Anna Kalinskaya	23	Win	6–4, 6–4
Dubai Tennis Championships; Dubai, United Arab Emirates; WTA 1000; Hard, outdoor; February 15, 2026 – February 21, 2026	12	3R	(Belgium) Elise Mertens	22	Win	2–6, 7–6^{(11–9)}, 6–3
Dubai Tennis Championships; Dubai, United Arab Emirates; WTA 1000; Hard, outdoor; February 15, 2026 – February 21, 2026	13	QF	(Philippines) Alexandra Eala	47	Win	6–0, 6–2
Dubai Tennis Championships; Dubai, United Arab Emirates; WTA 1000; Hard, outdoor; February 15, 2026 – February 21, 2026	14	SF	(Ukraine) Elina Svitolina (7)	9	Loss	4–6, 7–6^{(15–13)}, 4–6
Indian Wells Open; Indian Wells, United States; WTA 1000; Hard, outdoor; March 4, 2026 – March 15, 2026	–	1R	Bye			
Indian Wells Open; Indian Wells, United States; WTA 1000; Hard, outdoor; March 4, 2026 – March 15, 2026	15	2R	(Uzbekistan) Kamilla Rakhimova (Q)	88	Win	6–3, 7–6^{(7–5)}
Indian Wells Open; Indian Wells, United States; WTA 1000; Hard, outdoor; March 4, 2026 – March 15, 2026	16	3R	(Philippines) Alexandra Eala (31)	32	Loss	2–6, 0–2 ret.
Miami Open; Miami, United States; WTA 1000; Hard, outdoor; March 17, 2026 - March 29, 2026	–	1R	Bye			
Miami Open; Miami, United States; WTA 1000; Hard, outdoor; March 17, 2026 - March 29, 2026	17	2R	(Italy) Elisabetta Cocciaretto	44	Win	3–6, 6–4, 6–3
Miami Open; Miami, United States; WTA 1000; Hard, outdoor; March 17, 2026 - March 29, 2026	18	3R	(United States) Alycia Parks	105	Win	3–6, 6–0, 6–1
Miami Open; Miami, United States; WTA 1000; Hard, outdoor; March 17, 2026 - March 29, 2026	19	4R	(Romania) Sorana Cîrstea	35	Win	6–4, 3–6, 6–2
Miami Open; Miami, United States; WTA 1000; Hard, outdoor; March 17, 2026 - March 29, 2026	20	QF	(Switzerland) Belinda Bencic (12)	12	Win	6–2, 1–6, 6–3
Miami Open; Miami, United States; WTA 1000; Hard, outdoor; March 17, 2026 - March 29, 2026	21	SF	(Czech Republic) Karolína Muchová (13)	14	Win	6–1, 6–1
Miami Open; Miami, United States; WTA 1000; Hard, outdoor; March 17, 2026 - March 29, 2026	22	F	Aryna Sabalenka (1)	1	Loss	2–6, 6–4, 3–6
Stuttgart Open; Stuttgart, Germany; WTA 500; Clay, indoor; April 13, 2026 – April 19, 2026	–	1R	Bye			
Stuttgart Open; Stuttgart, Germany; WTA 500; Clay, indoor; April 13, 2026 – April 19, 2026	23	2R	Liudmila Samsonova	21	Win	7–5, 6–1
Stuttgart Open; Stuttgart, Germany; WTA 500; Clay, indoor; April 13, 2026 – April 19, 2026	24	QF	(Czech Republic) Karolína Muchová (7)	12	Loss	3–6, 7–5, 3–6
Madrid Open; Madrid, Spain; WTA 1000; Clay, outdoor; April 23, 2026 – May 3, 2026	–	1R	Bye			
Madrid Open; Madrid, Spain; WTA 1000; Clay, outdoor; April 23, 2026 – May 3, 2026	25	2R	(France) Leolia Jeanjean (Q)	126	Win	6–3, 6–0
Madrid Open; Madrid, Spain; WTA 1000; Clay, outdoor; April 23, 2026 – May 3, 2026	26	3R	(Romania) Sorana Cîrstea (25)	26	Win	4–6, 7–5, 6–1
Madrid Open; Madrid, Spain; WTA 1000; Clay, outdoor; April 23, 2026 – May 3, 2026	27	4R	(Czech Republic) Linda Nosková (13)	13	Loss	4–6, 6–1, 6–7^{(5–7)}
Italian Open; Rome, Italy; WTA 1000; Clay, outdoor; May 5, 2026 – May 17, 2026	–	1R	Bye			
Italian Open; Rome, Italy; WTA 1000; Clay, outdoor; May 5, 2026 – May 17, 2026	28	2R	(Czech Republic) Tereza Valentová	48	Win	6–3, 6–4
Italian Open; Rome, Italy; WTA 1000; Clay, outdoor; May 5, 2026 – May 17, 2026	29	3R	(Argentina) Solana Sierra	72	Win	5–7, 6–0, 6–4
Italian Open; Rome, Italy; WTA 1000; Clay, outdoor; May 5, 2026 – May 17, 2026	30	4R	(United States) Iva Jovic (16)	17	Win	5–7, 7–5, 6–2
Italian Open; Rome, Italy; WTA 1000; Clay, outdoor; May 5, 2026 – May 17, 2026	31	QF	Mirra Andreeva (8)	7	Win	4–6, 6–2, 6–4
Italian Open; Rome, Italy; WTA 1000; Clay, outdoor; May 5, 2026 – May 17, 2026	32	SF	(Romania) Sorana Cîrstea (26)	27	Win	6–4, 6–3
Italian Open; Rome, Italy; WTA 1000; Clay, outdoor; May 5, 2026 – May 17, 2026	33	F	(Ukraine) Elina Svitolina (7)	10	Loss	4–6, 7–6^{(7–3)}, 2–6
French Open; Paris, France; Grand Slam; Clay, outdoor; 24 May 2026 – 8 June 2026	34	1R	(United States) Taylor Townsend	75	Win	6–4, 6–0
French Open; Paris, France; Grand Slam; Clay, outdoor; 24 May 2026 – 8 June 2026	35	2R	(Egypt) Mayar Sherif (Q)	129	Win	6–3, 6–2
French Open; Paris, France; Grand Slam; Clay, outdoor; 24 May 2026 – 8 June 2026	36	3R	(Austria) Anastasia Potapova (28)	30	Loss	6–4, 6–7^{(1–7)}, 4–6
Berlin Open; Berlin, Germany; WTA 500; Grass, outdoor; 15 June 2026 – 21 June 2026	–	1R	Bye			
Berlin Open; Berlin, Germany; WTA 500; Grass, outdoor; 15 June 2026 – 21 June 2026	37	2R	(Spain) Paula Badosa (WC)	142	Loss	6–1, 3–6, 2–6
Wimbledon Championships; London, United Kingdom; Grand Slam; Grass, outdoor; 29 June 2026 – 12 July 2026	38	1R	(Germany) Tamara Korpatsch	78	Win	6–2, 6–1
Wimbledon Championships; London, United Kingdom; Grand Slam; Grass, outdoor; 29 June 2026 – 12 July 2026	39	2R	(Argentina) Solana Sierra	56	Win	6–3, 3–6, 7–6^{(10–7)}
Wimbledon Championships; London, United Kingdom; Grand Slam; Grass, outdoor; 29 June 2026 – 12 July 2026	40	3R	(United States) Claire Liu (Q)	146	Win	6–3, 6–7^{(5–7)}, 6–2
Wimbledon Championships; London, United Kingdom; Grand Slam; Grass, outdoor; 29 June 2026 – 12 July 2026	41	4R	(Switzerland) Belinda Bencic (11)	11	Win	4–6, 6–3, 6–4
Wimbledon Championships; London, United Kingdom; Grand Slam; Grass, outdoor; 29 June 2026 – 12 July 2026	42	QF	(United States) Jessica Pegula (4)	4	Win	4–6, 6–3, 6–3
Wimbledon Championships; London, United Kingdom; Grand Slam; Grass, outdoor; 29 June 2026 – 12 July 2026	43	SF	(Czech Republic) Karolína Muchová (10)	9	Loss	2–6, 6–1, 6–7^{(10–12)}
Canadian Open; Toronto, Canada; WTA 1000; Hard, outdoor; August 2, 2026 – August 13, 2026	–	1R	Bye			
Canadian Open; Toronto, Canada; WTA 1000; Hard, outdoor; August 2, 2026 – August 13, 2026	44	2R	(United States) Kayla Day (Q)	131	Win	6–2, 7–5
Canadian Open; Toronto, Canada; WTA 1000; Hard, outdoor; August 2, 2026 – August 13, 2026	45	3R	(Greece) Maria Sakkari (29)	33	Win	6–1, 6–4
Canadian Open; Toronto, Canada; WTA 1000; Hard, outdoor; August 2, 2026 – August 13, 2026	46	4R	Alina Korneeva	89	Win	6–3, 6–1
Canadian Open; Toronto, Canada; WTA 1000; Hard, outdoor; August 2, 2026 – August 13, 2026	–	QF	(Switzerland) Belinda Bencic (12)	14	Walkover	—N/a
Canadian Open; Toronto, Canada; WTA 1000; Hard, outdoor; August 2, 2026 – August 13, 2026	47	SF	(Kazakhstan) Elena Rybakina (2)	2	Loss	7–5, 2–6, 2–6
Cincinnati Open; Cincinnati, United States; WTA 1000; Hard, outdoor; August 13, 2026 – August 23, 2026	–	1R	Bye			
Cincinnati Open; Cincinnati, United States; WTA 1000; Hard, outdoor; August 13, 2026 – August 23, 2026	48	2R	Liudmila Samsonova	43	Win	2–6, 6–4, 6–1
Cincinnati Open; Cincinnati, United States; WTA 1000; Hard, outdoor; August 13, 2026 – August 23, 2026	49	3R	(United States) Ann Li (28)	29	Win	6–1, 7–6^{(7–3)}
Cincinnati Open; Cincinnati, United States; WTA 1000; Hard, outdoor; August 13, 2026 – August 23, 2026	50	4R	(Czech Republic) Marie Bouzkova (22)	27	Win	6–3, 6–2
Cincinnati Open; Cincinnati, United States; WTA 1000; Hard, outdoor; August 13, 2026 – August 23, 2026	51	QF	(Ukraine) Marta Kostyuk (10)	11	Win	6–2, 6–2
Cincinnati Open; Cincinnati, United States; WTA 1000; Hard, outdoor; August 13, 2026 – August 23, 2026	52	SF	(Serbia) Sara Bejlek	35	Win	6–4, 6–1
Cincinnati Open; Cincinnati, United States; WTA 1000; Hard, outdoor; August 13, 2026 – August 23, 2026	53	W	(United States) Jessica Pegula (3)	3	Win (1)	6–2, 6–4
US Open; New York, United States; Grand Slam; Hard, outdoor; 30 August 2026 – 13 September 2026	54	1R	(Turkey) Zeynep Sönmez	53	Win	6–3, 6–4
US Open; New York, United States; Grand Slam; Hard, outdoor; 30 August 2026 – 13 September 2026	55	2R	(Spain) Paula Badosa	87	Win	6–4, 7–6^{(7–5)}
US Open; New York, United States; Grand Slam; Hard, outdoor; 30 August 2026 – 13 September 2026	56	3R	(Spain) Cristina Bucsa	40	Win	6–3, 6–4
US Open; New York, United States; Grand Slam; Hard, outdoor; 30 August 2026 – 13 September 2026	57	4R	(United States) Iva Jovic (14)	14	Win	6–1, 6–4
US Open; New York, United States; Grand Slam; Hard, outdoor; 30 August 2026 – 13 September 2026	58	QF	Mirra Andreeva (5)	5	Win	2–6, 7–6^{(9–7)}, 6–2
US Open; New York, United States; Grand Slam; Hard, outdoor; 30 August 2026 – 13 September 2026	59	SF	(Kazakhstan) Elena Rybakina (2)	2	Loss	6–3, 4–6, 4–6
China Open; Beijing, China; WTA 1000; Hard, outdoor; September 30, 2026 – October 11, 2026	–	1R	Bye			
China Open; Beijing, China; WTA 1000; Hard, outdoor; September 30, 2026 – October 11, 2026	60	2R	(Colombia) Camila Osorio	66	Win	7–6^{(7–4)}, 4–6, 6–2
China Open; Beijing, China; WTA 1000; Hard, outdoor; September 30, 2026 – October 11, 2026	61	3R	(China) Sun Xinran (WC)	582	Win	7–5, 6–1
China Open; Beijing, China; WTA 1000; Hard, outdoor; September 30, 2026 – October 11, 2026	62	4R	(Belgium) Elise Mertens (13)	19	Loss	3–6, 3–6

=== Doubles matches ===
Tournament	Match	Round	Opponent	Rank	Result	Score
Qatar Open; Doha, Qatar; WTA 1000; Hard, outdoor; February 8, 2026 – February 14, 2026; Partner: (Canada) Victoria Mboko	1	1R	(Spain) Cristina Bucsa / (United States) Nicole Melichar-Martinez	22 / 17	Loss	6–4, 4–6, 9–11
Madrid Open; Madrid, Spain; WTA 1000; Clay, outdoor; April 21, 2026 – May 3, 2026; Partner: (United States) Robin Montgomery	2	1R	Irina Khromacheva / (Mexico) Giuliana Olmos	37 / 43	Win	6–3, 6–4
Madrid Open; Madrid, Spain; WTA 1000; Clay, outdoor; April 21, 2026 – May 3, 2026; Partner: (United States) Robin Montgomery	3	2R	(Norway) Ulrikke Eikeri / (United States) Quinn Gleason	36 / 52	Walkover	—N/a
Italian Open; Rome, Italy; WTA 1000; Clay, outdoor; May 5, 2026 – May 17, 2026; Partner: (United States) Caty McNally	4	1R	(Indonesia) Aldila Sutjiadi / (Indonesia) Janice Tjen	46 / 41	Win	5–7, 7–5, 13–11
Italian Open; Rome, Italy; WTA 1000; Clay, outdoor; May 5, 2026 – May 17, 2026; Partner: (United States) Caty McNally	5	2R	(Czech Republic) Marie Bouzkova / Alexandra Panova	68 / 20	Win	6–3, 7–5
Italian Open; Rome, Italy; WTA 1000; Clay, outdoor; May 5, 2026 – May 17, 2026; Partner: (United States) Caty McNally	6	QF	(Spain) Cristina Bucsa / (United States) Nicole Melichar-Martinez (7)	17 / 16	Walkover	—N/a
Berlin Open; Berlin, Germany; WTA 500; Grass, outdoor; 15 June 2026 – 21 June 2026; Partner: (United States) Jessica Pegula	7	1R	(Austria) Anastasia Potapova / Diana Shnaider	451 / 29	Win	7–6^{(7–4)}, 6–4
Berlin Open; Berlin, Germany; WTA 500; Grass, outdoor; 15 June 2026 – 21 June 2026; Partner: (United States) Jessica Pegula	8	QF	(United States) Asia Muhammad / (Hungary) Fanny Stollar	40 / 36	Loss	2–6, 6–3, 8–10
Canadian Open; Toronto, Canada; WTA 1000; Hard, outdoor; August 2, 2026 – August 13, 2026; Partner: (United States) Caty McNally	9	1R	(Canada) Gabriela Dabrowski / Ekaterina Alexandrova	3 / 51	Win	3–6, 6–3, 11–9
Canadian Open; Toronto, Canada; WTA 1000; Hard, outdoor; August 2, 2026 – August 13, 2026; Partner: (United States) Caty McNally	10	2R	(Czech Republic) Katerina Siniakova / (China) Zhang Shuai (1)	1 / 8	Loss	0–6, 4–6

=== Mixed doubles matches ===
Tournament	Match	Round	Opponent	Result	Score
United Cup; Perth/Sydney, Australia; United Cup; Hard, outdoor; January 2, 2026 – January 11, 2026; Partner: (United States) Christian Harrison	1	RR	(Argentina) Guido Andreozzi / (Argentina) Maria Carle	Win	6–4, 6–1
United Cup; Perth/Sydney, Australia; United Cup; Hard, outdoor; January 2, 2026 – January 11, 2026; Partner: (United States) Christian Harrison	2	RR	(Spain) Iñigo Cervantes / (Spain) Yvonne Cavalle-Reimers	Win	7–6^{(7–5)}, 6–0
United Cup; Perth/Sydney, Australia; United Cup; Hard, outdoor; January 2, 2026 – January 11, 2026; Partner: (United States) Christian Harrison	3	QF	(Greece) Stefanos Tsitsipas / (Greece) Maria Sakkari	Win	4–6, 6–4, 10–8
United Cup; Perth/Sydney, Australia; United Cup; Hard, outdoor; January 2, 2026 – January 11, 2026; Partner: (United States) Christian Harrison	4	SF	(Poland) Jan Zieliński / (Poland) Katarzyna Kawa	Loss	6–7^{(5–7)}, 6–7^{(3–7)}

== Tournament schedule ==
Key
W	F	SF	QF	#R	RR

(W) winner; (F) finalist; (SF) semifinalist; (QF) quarterfinalist; (#R) rounds 4, 3, 2, 1; (RR) round-robin stage.

=== Singles schedule ===
Date	Tournament	Location	Category	Surface	Prev. result	Prev. points	New points	Outcome
January 2, 2026 – January 11, 2026	United Cup*	Perth, Australia	WTA 500	Hard	W	500	150	Semfinal defeated (Poland) Iga Świątek; 6–4, 6–2
January 18, 2026 – February 1, 2026	Australian Open	Melbourne, Australia	Grand Slam	Hard	QF	430	430	Quarterfinals lost to (Ukraine) Elina Svitolina; 1–6, 2–6
February 8, 2026 – February 14, 2026	Qatar Open	Doha, Qatar	WTA 1000	Hard	2R	10	10	Second round lost to (Italy) Elisabetta Cocciaretto; 4–6, 2–6
February 15, 2026 – February 26, 2026	Dubai Tennis Championships	Dubai, United Arab Emirates	WTA 1000	Hard	2R	10	390	Semifinals lost to (Ukraine) Elina Svitolina; 4–6, 7–6^{(15–13)}, 4–6
March 4, 2026 – March 15, 2026	Indian Wells Open	Indian Wells, United States	WTA 1000	Hard	4R	120	65	Third round lost to (Philippines) Alexandra Eala; 2–6, 0–2 ret.
March 17, 2026 – March 29, 2026	Miami Open	Miami, United States	WTA 1000	Hard	4R	120	650	Finals lost to Aryna Sabalenka; 2–6, 6–4, 3–6
April 13, 2026 – April 19, 2026	Stuttgart Open	Stuttgart, Germany	WTA 500	Clay	QF	108	108	Quarterfinals lost to (Czech Republic) Karolína Muchová; 3–6, 7–5, 3–6
April 21, 2026 – May 3, 2026	Madrid Open	Madrid, Spain	WTA 1000	Clay	F	650	120	Fourth round lost to (Czech Republic) Linda Nosková; 4–6, 6–1, 6–7^{(5–7)}
May 5, 2026 – May 17, 2026	Italian Open	Rome, Italy	WTA 1000	Clay	F	650	650	Final lost to (Ukraine) Elina Svitolina; 4–6, 7–6^{(7–3)}, 2–6
May 24, 2026 – June 7, 2026	French Open	Paris, France	Grand Slam	Clay	W	2000	130	Third round lost to (Austria) Anastasia Potapova 6–4, 6–7^{(1–7)}, 4–6
June 15, 2026 – June 21, 2026	Berlin Open	Berlin, Germany	WTA 500	Grass	2R	1	1	Second round lost to (Spain) Paula Badosa 6–1, 3–6, 2–6
June 29, 2026 – July 12, 2026	Wimbledon Championships	London, United Kingdom	Grand Slam	Grass	1R	10	780	Semifinals lost to (Czech Republic) Karolína Muchová; 2–6, 6–1, 6–7^{(10–12)}
August 2, 2026 – August 13, 2026	Canadian Open	Toronto, Canada	WTA 1000	Hard	4R	120	390	Semifinals lost to (Kazakhstan) Elena Rybakina; 7–5, 2–6, 2–6
August 13, 2026 – August 23, 2026	Cincinnati Open	Cincinnati, United States	WTA 1000	Hard	QF	215	1000	Winner defeated (United States) Jessica Pegula 6–2, 6–4
August 30, 2026 – September 13, 2026	US Open	New York, United States	Grand Slam	Hard	4R	240	780	Semfinals lost to (Kazakhstan) Elena Rybakina 6–3, 4–6, 4–6
September 30, 2026 – October 11, 2026	China Open	Beijing, China	WTA 1000	Hard	SF	390	120	Fourth round lost to (Belgium) Elise Mertens 3–6, 3–6
October 12, 2026 – October 18, 2026	Wuhan Open	Wuhan, China	WTA 1000	Hard	W	1000	A	Withdrew
Total year-end points						6359	5774	▼585

- *Denotes tournament does not count as a singles title but points are earned

== Yearly records ==
=== Head-to-head match-ups ===
Gauff has a 49–16 (75%) WTA match win–loss record in the 2026 season. Her record against players who were part of the WTA rankings top ten at the time of their meetings is 7–7 (50%). Bold indicates player was ranked top 10 at the time of at least one meeting. The following list is ordered by number of wins:

- (Argentina) Solana Sierra 3–0
- (Romania) Sorana Cîrstea 3–0
- **(United States) Jessica Pegula** 3–0
- (United States) Iva Jovic 2–0
- **Mirra Andreeva** 2–0
- (Uzbekistan) Kamilla Rakhimova 2–0
- Liudmila Samsonova 2–0
- **(Ukraine) Marta Kostyuk** 2–0
- (Greece) Maria Sakkari 2–0
- (Switzerland) Belinda Bencic 2–0
- (Egypt) Mayar Sherif 1–0
- (Czech Republic) Sara Bejlek 1–0
- (Spain) Cristina Bucsa 1–0
- (Colombia) Camila Osorio 1–0
- (China) Sun Xinran 1–0
- (Germany) Tamara Korpatsch 1–0
- (United States) Claire Liu 1–0
- (Turkey) Zeynep Sönmez 1–0
- (United States) Kayla Day 1–0
- (United States) Taylor Townsend 1–0
- Alina Korneeva 1–0
- (Czech Republic) Tereza Valentová 1–0
- (Czech Republic) Marie Bouzkova 1–0
- (France) Leolia Jeanjean 1–0
- (United States) Ann Li 1–0
- **(Poland) Iga Świątek** 1–0
- (Serbia) Olga Danilović 1–0
- Anna Kalinskaya 1–0
- (United States) Hailey Baptiste 1–0
- (United States) Alycia Parks 1–0
- **(Czech Republic) Karolína Muchová** 2–2
- (Italy) Elisabetta Cocciaretto 1–1
- (Spain) Paula Badosa 1–1
- (Belgium) Elise Mertens 1–1
- (Philippines) Alexandra Eala 1–1
- **Aryna Sabalenka** 0–1
- (Spain) Jéssica Bouzas Maneiro 0–1
- (Austria) Anastasia Potapova 0–1
- **(Czech Republic) Linda Nosková** 0–2
- **(Kazakhstan) Elena Rybakina** 0–2
- **(Ukraine) Elina Svitolina** 0–3

=== Top 10 record ===
Result	W–L	Opponent	Rk	Tournament	Surface	Rd	Score	Rk	Ref
Win	1–0	(Poland) Iga Świątek	2	United Cup, Australia	Hard	SF	6–4, 6–2	3	
Loss	1–1	(Ukraine) Elina Svitolina	9	Dubai Tennis Championships, United Arab Emirates	Hard	QF	4–6, 7–6^{(15–13)}, 4–6	4	
Loss	1–2	Aryna Sabalenka	**1**	Miami Open, United States	Hard	F	2–6, 6–4, 3–6	4	
Win	2–2	Mirra Andreeva	7	Italian Open, Italy	Clay	QF	4–6, 6–2, 6–4	4	
Loss	2–3	(Ukraine) Elina Svitolina	10	Italian Open, Italy	Clay	F	4–6, 7–6^{(7–3)}, 2–6	4	
Win	3–3	(United States) Jessica Pegula	4	Wimbledon, United Kingdom	Grass	QF	4–6, 6–3, 6–3	7	
Loss	3–4	(Czech Republic) Karolína Muchová	9	Wimbledon, United Kingdom	Grass	SF	2–6, 6–1, 6–7^{(10–12)}	7	
Loss	3–5	(Kazakhstan) Elena Rybakina	2	Canadian Open, Canada	Hard	SF	7–5, 2–6, 2–6	4	
Win	4–5	(United States) Jessica Pegula	3	Cincinnati Open, United States	Hard	**F**	6–2, 6–4	4	
Win	5–5	Mirra Andreeva	5	US Open, United States	Hard	QF	2–6, 7–6^{(9–7)}, 6–2	4	
Loss	5–6	(Kazakhstan) Elena Rybakina	2	US Open, United States	Hard	SF	6–3, 4–6, 4–6	4	
Win	6–6	(United States) Jessica Pegula	5	WTA Finals, United States	Hard	RR	6–4, 6–7^{(5–7)}, 6–2	4	
Loss	6–7	(Czech Republic) Linda Noskova	8	WTA Finals, United States	Hard	RR	3–6, 3–6	4	
Win	7–7	(Ukraine) Marta Kostyuk	9	WTA Finals, United States	Hard	RR	6–4, 7–5	4	

- Key: (Rk) first use, opponent rank; (Rd) round; (Rk) 2nd use, player rank; (Ref) reference; (F) final; (SF) semifinal; (QF) quarterfinal; (#R) rounds 4, 3, 2, 1; (RR) round-robin stage; (Q#) qualifying rounds or stages (3), 2, 1.

=== Finals ===
==== Singles: 2 (1 title, 2 runner-ups) ====
Legend Grand Slam (0–0) WTA 1000 (1–2)	Finals by surface Hard (1–1) Clay (0–1)

Result	W–L	Date	Tournament	Tier	Surface	Opponent	Score
Loss	0–1	March 2026	Miami Open, United States	WTA 1000	Hard	Aryna Sabalenka	2–6, 6–4, 3–6
Loss	0–2	May 2026	Italian Open, Italy	WTA 1000	Clay	(Ukraine) Elina Svitolina	4–6, 7–6^{(7–3)}, 2–6
Win	1–2	August 2026	Cincinnati Open, United States	WTA 1000	Hard	(United States) Jessica Pegula	6–2, 6–4

==== Doubles: 0 (titles) ====
Legend WTA 1000 (0–0)	Finals by surface Hard (0–0)

Result	W–L	Date	Tournament	Tier	Surface	Partner	Opponents	Score

=== Earnings ===
- **Bold** font denotes tournament win

**Singles**
Event	Prize money	Year-to-date
United Cup	$554,000	$554,000
Australian Open	$485,565	$1,039,965
Qatar Open	$26,000	$1,065,965
Dubai Tennis Championships	$197,000	$1,262,965
Indian Wells Open	$47,375	$1,310,340
Miami Open	$612,340	$1,922,680
Stuttgart Open	$35,000	$1,957,680
Madrid Open	$92,470	$2,050,150
Italian Open	$564,920	$2,615,070
French Open	$218,169	$2,833,239
Berlin Open	$17,795	$2,851,034
Wimbledon Championships	$1,205,512	$4,056,546
Canadian Open	$297,315	$4,353,861
Cincinnati Open	**$1,085,220**	$5,439,081
US Open	$1,450,000	$6,889,081
China Open	$105,720	$6,994,801
		$6,994,801
**Doubles**
Event	Prize money	Year-to-date
Qatar Open	$5,750	$5,750
Madrid Open	$15,610	$21,360
Italian Open	$26,950	$48,310
Berlin Open	$5,575	$53,885
Canadian Open	$28,810	$82,695
		$82,695
**Total**
		**$7,077,496**

Figures in United States dollars (USD) unless noted.

== See also ==
- 2026 Iga Świątek tennis season
- 2026 Elena Rybakina tennis season
- 2026 Aryna Sabalenka tennis season
