= 2026 Iga Świątek tennis season =

2026 tennis player season

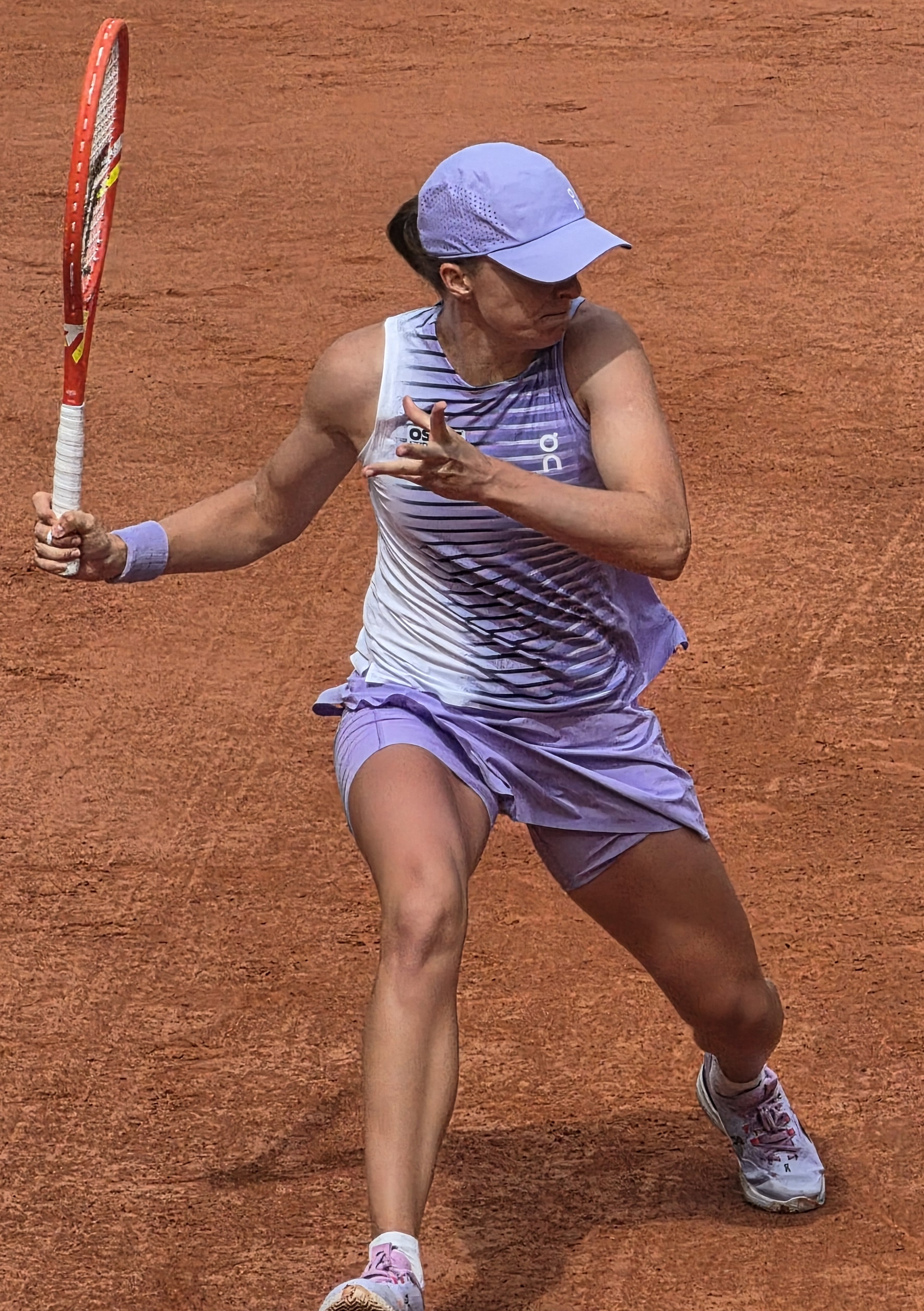
- Swiatek playing at the 2026 French Open
- Full name: Iga Świątek
- Country: Poland
- Calendar prize money: $4,499,239

Singles
- Season record: 42–16 (72%)
- Calendar titles: 1
- Current ranking: No. 9
- Ranking change from previous year: ▼7

Grand Slam & significant results
- Australian Open: QF
- French Open: 4R
- Wimbledon: 3R
- US Open: 4R
- Last updated on: 26 October 2026.

The 2026 Iga Świątek tennis season officially began on 2 January 2026 at the 2026 United Cup as the start of the 2026 WTA Tour.

This was one of her worst seasons on tour, where she failed to qualify for WTA Finals for the first time since 2019, and didn't win a major in the entire year for the first time since 2021. She finished the year ranked No.9 in the world, her worst year end ranking since 2020.

She won a WTA 1000 tournament at Canadian Open, defeating World no.2 Elena Rybakina in the final in striaght sets.

== All matches ==
Key
W	F	SF	QF	#R	RR	Q#	P#	DNQ	A	Z#	PO	G	S	B	NMS	NTI	P	NH

(W) winner; (F) finalist; (SF) semifinalist; (QF) quarterfinalist; (#R) rounds 4, 3, 2, 1; (RR) round-robin stage; (Q#) qualification round; (P#) preliminary round; (DNQ) did not qualify; (A) absent; (Z#) Davis/Fed Cup Zonal Group (with number indication) or (PO) play-off; (G) gold, (S) silver or (B) bronze Olympic/Paralympic medal; (NMS) not a Masters tournament; (NTI) not a Tier I tournament; (P) postponed; (NH) not held; (SR) strike rate (events won / competed); (W–L) win–loss record.
To avoid confusion and double counting, these charts are updated at the conclusion of a tournament or when the player's participation has ended.

=== Singles matches ===
Tournament	Match	Round	Opponent	Rank	Result	Score
United Cup; Perth/Sydney, Australia; United Cup; Hard, outdoor; 2 January 2026 – 11 January 2026	1	RR	(Germany) Eva Lys	40	Win	3–6, 6–3, 6–4
United Cup; Perth/Sydney, Australia; United Cup; Hard, outdoor; 2 January 2026 – 11 January 2026	2	RR	(Netherlands) Suzan Lamens	89	Win	6–3, 6–2
United Cup; Perth/Sydney, Australia; United Cup; Hard, outdoor; 2 January 2026 – 11 January 2026	3	QF	(Australia) Maya Joint	32	Win	6–1, 6–1
United Cup; Perth/Sydney, Australia; United Cup; Hard, outdoor; 2 January 2026 – 11 January 2026	4	SF	(United States) Coco Gauff	4	Loss	4–6, 2–6
United Cup; Perth/Sydney, Australia; United Cup; Hard, outdoor; 2 January 2026 – 11 January 2026	5	F	(Switzerland) Belinda Bencic	11	Loss	6–3, 0–6, 3–6
Australian Open; Melbourne, Australia; Grand Slam; Hard, outdoor; 18 January 2026 – 1 February 2026	6	1R	(China) Yuan Yue (Q)	130	Win	7–6^{(7–5)}, 6–3
Australian Open; Melbourne, Australia; Grand Slam; Hard, outdoor; 18 January 2026 – 1 February 2026	7	2R	(Czech Republic) Marie Bouzková	45	Win	6–2, 6–3
Australian Open; Melbourne, Australia; Grand Slam; Hard, outdoor; 18 January 2026 – 1 February 2026	8	3R	Anna Kalinskaya (Note: Russian and Belarus players are not allowed to compete under the name or flag of their country following the Russian invasion of Ukraine.) (31)	33	Win	6–1, 1–6, 6–1
Australian Open; Melbourne, Australia; Grand Slam; Hard, outdoor; 18 January 2026 – 1 February 2026	9	4R	(Australia) Maddison Inglis (Q)	168	Win	6–0, 6–3
Australian Open; Melbourne, Australia; Grand Slam; Hard, outdoor; 18 January 2026 – 1 February 2026	10	QF	(Kazakhstan) Elena Rybakina (5)	5	Loss	5–7, 1–6
Qatar Open; Doha, Qatar; WTA 1000; Hard, outdoor; 8 February 2026 – 14 February 2026	–	1R	Bye			
Qatar Open; Doha, Qatar; WTA 1000; Hard, outdoor; 8 February 2026 – 14 February 2026	11	2R	(Indonesia) Janice Tjen (WC)	46	Win	6–0, 6–3
Qatar Open; Doha, Qatar; WTA 1000; Hard, outdoor; 8 February 2026 – 14 February 2026	12	3R	(Australia) Daria Kasatkina	61	Win	5–7, 6–1, 6–1
Qatar Open; Doha, Qatar; WTA 1000; Hard, outdoor; 8 February 2026 – 14 February 2026	13	QF	(Greece) Maria Sakkari	52	Loss	6–2, 4–6, 5–7
Indian Wells Open; Indian Wells, United States; WTA 1000; Hard, outdoor; 4 March 2026 – 15 March 2026	–	1R	Bye			
Indian Wells Open; Indian Wells, United States; WTA 1000; Hard, outdoor; 4 March 2026 – 15 March 2026	14	2R	(United States) Kayla Day (Q)	187	Win	6–0, 7–6^{(7–2)}
Indian Wells Open; Indian Wells, United States; WTA 1000; Hard, outdoor; 4 March 2026 – 15 March 2026	15	3R	(Greece) Maria Sakkari (32)	34	Win	6–3, 6–2
Indian Wells Open; Indian Wells, United States; WTA 1000; Hard, outdoor; 4 March 2026 – 15 March 2026	16	4R	(Czech Republic) Karolína Muchová (13)	13	Win	6–2, 6–0
Indian Wells Open; Indian Wells, United States; WTA 1000; Hard, outdoor; 4 March 2026 – 15 March 2026	17	QF	(Ukraine) Elina Svitolina (9)	9	Loss	2–6, 6–4, 4–6
Miami Open; Miami Gardens, United States; WTA 1000; Hard, outdoor; 17 March 2026 – 29 March 2026	–	1R	Bye			
Miami Open; Miami Gardens, United States; WTA 1000; Hard, outdoor; 17 March 2026 – 29 March 2026	18	2R	(Poland) Magda Linette	50	Loss	6–1, 5–7, 3–6
Stuttgart Open; Stuttgart, Germany; WTA 500; Clay, indoor; 13 April 2026 – 19 April 2026	–	1R	Bye			
Stuttgart Open; Stuttgart, Germany; WTA 500; Clay, indoor; 13 April 2026 – 19 April 2026	19	2R	(Germany) Laura Siegemund	51	Win	6–2, 6–3
Stuttgart Open; Stuttgart, Germany; WTA 500; Clay, indoor; 13 April 2026 – 19 April 2026	20	QF	Mirra Andreeva	9	Loss	6–3, 4–6, 3–6
Madrid Open; Madrid, Spain; WTA 1000; Clay, outdoor; 21 April 2026 – 3 May 2026	–	1R	Bye			
Madrid Open; Madrid, Spain; WTA 1000; Clay, outdoor; 21 April 2026 – 3 May 2026	21	2R	(Ukraine) Daria Snigur (Q)	98	Win	6–1, 6–2
Madrid Open; Madrid, Spain; WTA 1000; Clay, outdoor; 21 April 2026 – 3 May 2026	22	3R	(United States) Ann Li (31)	34	Loss	6–7^{(4–7)}, 6–2, 0–3 ret.
Italian Open; Rome, Italy; WTA 1000; Clay, outdoor; 5 May 2026 – 17 May 2026	–	1R	Bye			
Italian Open; Rome, Italy; WTA 1000; Clay, outdoor; 5 May 2026 – 17 May 2026	23	2R	(United States) Caty McNally	63	Win	6–1, 6–7^{(5–7)}, 6–3
Italian Open; Rome, Italy; WTA 1000; Clay, outdoor; 5 May 2026 – 17 May 2026	24	3R	(Italy) Elisabetta Cocciaretto	41	Win	6–1, 6–0
Italian Open; Rome, Italy; WTA 1000; Clay, outdoor; 5 May 2026 – 17 May 2026	25	4R	(Japan) Naomi Osaka (15)	16	Win	6–2, 6–1
Italian Open; Rome, Italy; WTA 1000; Clay, outdoor; 5 May 2026 – 17 May 2026	26	QF	(United States) Jessica Pegula (5)	5	Win	6–1, 6–2
Italian Open; Rome, Italy; WTA 1000; Clay, outdoor; 5 May 2026 – 17 May 2026	27	SF	(Ukraine) Elina Svitolina (7)	10	Loss	4–6, 6–2, 2–6
French Open; Paris, France; Grand Slam; Clay, outdoor; 24 May 2026 – 7 June 2026	28	1R	(Australia) Emerson Jones (WC)	136	Win	6–1, 6–2
French Open; Paris, France; Grand Slam; Clay, outdoor; 24 May 2026 – 7 June 2026	29	2R	(Czech Republic) Sára Bejlek	35	Win	6–2, 6–3
French Open; Paris, France; Grand Slam; Clay, outdoor; 24 May 2026 – 7 June 2026	30	3R	(Poland) Magda Linette	73	Win	6–4, 6–4
French Open; Paris, France; Grand Slam; Clay, outdoor; 24 May 2026 – 7 June 2026	31	4R	(Ukraine) Marta Kostyuk (15)	15	Loss	5–7, 1–6
Bad Homburg Open; Bad Homburg, Germany; WTA 500; Grass, outdoor; 21 June 2026 – 27 June 2026	–	1R	Bye			
Bad Homburg Open; Bad Homburg, Germany; WTA 500; Grass, outdoor; 21 June 2026 – 27 June 2026	32	2R	(United States) Emma Navarro	24	Loss	5–7, 6–2, 3–6
Wimbledon; London, United Kingdom; Grand Slam; Grass, outdoor; 29 June 2025 – 12 July 2025	33	1R	(United States) Taylor Townsend	79	Win	6–1, 2–6, 6–3
Wimbledon; London, United Kingdom; Grand Slam; Grass, outdoor; 29 June 2025 – 12 July 2025	34	2R	(Czech Republic) Karolína Plíšková (PR)	73	Win	6–1, 6–3
Wimbledon; London, United Kingdom; Grand Slam; Grass, outdoor; 29 June 2025 – 12 July 2025	35	3R	(Philippines) Alexandra Eala (29)	32	Loss	6–7^{(9–11)}, 2–6
Canadian Open; Toronto, Canada; WTA 1000; Hard, outdoor; 1 August 2026 – 13 August 2026	–	1R	Bye			
Canadian Open; Toronto, Canada; WTA 1000; Hard, outdoor; 1 August 2026 – 13 August 2026	36	2R	(Czech Republic) Sára Bejlek	38	Win	6–0, 6–3
Canadian Open; Toronto, Canada; WTA 1000; Hard, outdoor; 1 August 2026 – 13 August 2026	37	3R	(Switzerland) Viktorija Golubic	51	Win	6–2, 6–1
Canadian Open; Toronto, Canada; WTA 1000; Hard, outdoor; 1 August 2026 – 13 August 2026	38	4R	(Ukraine) Marta Kostyuk (10)	11	Win	3–6, 6–1, 6–2
Canadian Open; Toronto, Canada; WTA 1000; Hard, outdoor; 1 August 2026 – 13 August 2026	39	QF	Diana Shnaider (15)	17	Win	6–2, 6–1
Canadian Open; Toronto, Canada; WTA 1000; Hard, outdoor; 1 August 2026 – 13 August 2026	40	SF	(Ukraine) Elina Svitolina (9)	9	Win	6–3, 1–6, 6–3
Canadian Open; Toronto, Canada; WTA 1000; Hard, outdoor; 1 August 2026 – 13 August 2026	41	W	(Kazakhstan) Elena Rybakina (2)	2	Win (1)	6–2, 6–3
Cincinnati Open; Mason, United States; WTA 1000; Hard, outdoor; 13 August 2026 – 23 August 2026	–	1R	Bye			
Cincinnati Open; Mason, United States; WTA 1000; Hard, outdoor; 13 August 2026 – 23 August 2026	42	2R	(Colombia) Emiliana Arango (Q)	95	Win	6–3, 6–0
Cincinnati Open; Mason, United States; WTA 1000; Hard, outdoor; 13 August 2026 – 23 August 2026	43	3R	(Greece) Maria Sakkari (29)	32	Win	4–6, 6–1, 6–1
Cincinnati Open; Mason, United States; WTA 1000; Hard, outdoor; 13 August 2026 – 23 August 2026	44	4R	(France) Diane Parry	66	Win	6–3, 6–3
Cincinnati Open; Mason, United States; WTA 1000; Hard, outdoor; 13 August 2026 – 23 August 2026	45	QF	(Kazakhstan) Elena Rybakina (2)	2	Win	4–1 ret.
Cincinnati Open; Mason, United States; WTA 1000; Hard, outdoor; 13 August 2026 – 23 August 2026	46	SF	(United States) Jessica Pegula (3)	3	Loss	5–7, 6–4, 4–6
US Open; New York City, United States; Grand Slam; Hard, outdoor; 30 August 2026 – 13 September 2026	47	1R	(China) Wang Xiyu	80	Win	6–2, 6–3
US Open; New York City, United States; Grand Slam; Hard, outdoor; 30 August 2026 – 13 September 2026	48	2R	(Argentina) Nadia Podoroska (PR)	449	Win	6–3, 6–2
US Open; New York City, United States; Grand Slam; Hard, outdoor; 30 August 2026 – 13 September 2026	49	3R	(Czech Republic) Marie Bouzkova (25)	26	Win	7–6^{(7–3)}, 7–6^{(7–3)}
US Open; New York City, United States; Grand Slam; Hard, outdoor; 30 August 2026 – 13 September 2026	50	4R	(China) Zheng Qinwen (Q)	121	Loss	5–7, 3–6
China Open; Beijing, China; WTA 1000; Hard, outdoor; 30 September 2026 – 11 October 2026	–	1R	Bye			
China Open; Beijing, China; WTA 1000; Hard, outdoor; 30 September 2026 – 11 October 2026	51	2R	(China) Yuan Yue (WC)	244	Win	6–2, 6–3
China Open; Beijing, China; WTA 1000; Hard, outdoor; 30 September 2026 – 11 October 2026	52	3R	(Croatia) Donna Vekić (30)	40	Win	4–6, 7–6^{(7–0)}, 6–2
China Open; Beijing, China; WTA 1000; Hard, outdoor; 30 September 2026 – 11 October 2026	53	4R	(United States) Iva Jovic (10)	13	Win	6–1, 6–3
China Open; Beijing, China; WTA 1000; Hard, outdoor; 30 September 2026 – 11 October 2026	54	QF	(Belgium) Elise Mertens (13)	19	Loss	6–7^{(0–7)}, 3–6
Wuhan Open; Wuhan, China; WTA 1000; Hard, outdoor; 12 October 2026 – 18 October 2026	–	1R	Bye			
Wuhan Open; Wuhan, China; WTA 1000; Hard, outdoor; 12 October 2026 – 18 October 2026	55	2R	(Poland) Magdalena Fręch (LL)	68	Win	6–2, 6–1
Wuhan Open; Wuhan, China; WTA 1000; Hard, outdoor; 12 October 2026 – 18 October 2026	56	3R	(United States) Ashlyn Krueger (LL)	56	Win	6–1, 6–4
Wuhan Open; Wuhan, China; WTA 1000; Hard, outdoor; 12 October 2026 – 18 October 2026	57	QF	(United States) Ann Li	31	Win	6–4, 6–1
Wuhan Open; Wuhan, China; WTA 1000; Hard, outdoor; 12 October 2026 – 18 October 2026	58	SF	(Poland) Maja Chwalińska (16)	22	Loss	5–7, 1–6

== Schedule ==
Key
W	F	SF	QF	#R	RR

(W) winner; (F) finalist; (SF) semifinalist; (QF) quarterfinalist; (#R) rounds 4, 3, 2, 1; (RR) round-robin stage.

=== Singles schedule ===
Date	Tournament	Location	Tier	Surface	Prev. result	Prev. points	New points	Result
2 January 2026 – 11 January 2026	United Cup	Australia	WTA 500	Hard	F	325	150	Winner but lost to (Switzerland) Belinda Bencic; 6–3, 0–6, 3–6
18 January 2026– 1 February 2026	Australian Open	Australia	Grand Slam	Hard	SF	780	430	Quarterfinals lost to (Kazakhstan) Elena Rybakina; 5–7, 1–6
8 February 2026 – 14 February 2026	Qatar Open	Qatar	WTA 1000	Hard	SF	390	215	Quarterfinals lost to (Greece) Maria Sakkari; 6–2, 4–6, 5–7
4 March 2026 – 15 March 2026	Indian Wells Open	United States	WTA 1000	Hard	SF	390	215	Quarterfinals lost to (Ukraine) Elina Svitolina; 2–6, 6–4, 4–6
17 March 2026 – 29 March 2026	Miami Open	United States	WTA 1000	Hard	QF	215	10	Second round lost to (Poland) Magda Linette; 6–1, 5–7, 3–6
13 April 2026 – 19 April 2026	Stuttgart Open	Germany	WTA 500	Clay (i)	QF	108	108	Quarterfinals lost to Mirra Andreeva; 6–3, 4–6, 3–6
21 April 2026 – 3 May 2026	Madrid Open	Spain	WTA 1000	Clay	SF	390	65	Third round lost to (United States) Ann Li; 6–7^{(4–7)}, 6–2, 0–3 ret
5 May 2026 – 17 May 2026	Italian Open	Italy	WTA 1000	Clay	3R	65	390	Semifinals lost to (Ukraine) Elina Svitolina; 4–6, 6–2, 2–6
24 May 2026 – 7 June 2026	French Open	France	Grand Slam	Clay	SF	780	240	Fourth round lost to (Ukraine) Marta Kostyuk; 5–7, 1–6
22 June 2026 – 28 June 2026	Bad Homburg Open	Germany	WTA 500	Grass	F	325	1	Second round lost to (United States) Emma Navarro; 5–7, 6–2, 3–6
29 June 2026 – 12 July 2026	Wimbledon	United Kingdom	Grand Slam	Grass	W	2000	130	Third round lost to (Philippines) Alexandra Eala; 6–7^{(9–11)}, 2–6
1 August 2026 – 13 August 2026	Canadian Open	Canada	WTA 1000	Hard	4R	120	1000	Winner defeated (Kazakhstan) Elena Rybakina; 6–2, 6–3
13 August 2026 – 23 August 2026	Cincinnati Open	United States	WTA 1000	Hard	W	1000	390	Semifinals lost to (United States) Jessica Pegula; 5–7, 6–4, 4–6
31 August 2026 – 13 September 2026	US Open	United States	Grand Slam	Hard	QF	430	240	Fourth round lost to (China) Zheng Qinwen; 5–7, 3–6
30 September 2026 – 11 October 2026	China Open	China	WTA 1000	Hard	4R	120	215	Quarterfinals lost to (Belgium) Elise Mertens; 6–7^{(0–7)}, 3–6
12 October 2026 – 18 October 2026	Wuhan Open	China	WTA 1000	Hard	QF	215	390	Semifinals lost to (Poland) Maja Chwalińska; 5–7, 1–6
Total year-end points						8395	4189	

== Yearly records ==
=== Head-to-head match-ups ===
Świątek has a 36–14 (72%) WTA match win–loss record in the 2026 season. Her record against players who were part of the WTA rankings top ten at the time of their meetings is 4–6 (40%). Bold indicates player was ranked top 10 at the time of at least one meeting. The following list is ordered by number of wins:

- (Czech Republic) Sára Bejlek 2–0
- (Czech Republic) Marie Bouzková 2–0
- (Colombia) Emiliana Arango 1–0
- (Italy) Elisabetta Cocciaretto 1–0
- (United States) Kayla Day 1–0
- (Australia) Maddison Inglis 1–0
- (Australia) Maya Joint 1–0
- (Australia) Emerson Jones 1–0
- Anna Kalinskaya 1–0
- (Australia) Daria Kasatkina 1–0
- (Switzerland) Viktorija Golubic 1–0
- (Netherlands) Suzan Lamens 1–0
- (Germany) Eva Lys 1–0
- (United States) Caty McNally 1–0
- (Czech Republic) Karolína Muchová 1–0
- (France) Diane Parry 1–0
- (Czech Republic) Karolina Pliskova 1–0
- (Japan) Naomi Osaka 1–0
- Diana Shnaider 1–0
- (Germany) Laura Siegemund 1–0
- (Ukraine) Daria Snigur 1–0
- (Indonesia) Janice Tjen 1–0
- (United States) Taylor Townsend 1–0
- (China) Yuan Yue 1–0
- (China) Wang Xiyu 1–0
- (Argentina) Nadia Podoroska 1–0
- (Croatia) Donna Vekić 1–0
- **(Kazakhstan) Elena Rybakina** 2–1
- (Greece) Maria Sakkari 2–1
- **(United States) Jessica Pegula** 1–1
- (Poland) Magda Linette 1–1
- (Ukraine) Marta Kostyuk 1–1
- **(Ukraine) Elina Svitolina** 1–2
- (China) Zheng Qinwen 0–1
- **Mirra Andreeva** 0–1
- (Switzerland) Belinda Bencic 0–1
- **(United States) Coco Gauff** 0–1
- (United States) Emma Navarro 0–1
- (Philippines) Alexandra Eala 0–1
- (United States) Ann Li 0–1

=== Top 10 record ===
- Key: (Rk) first use, opponent rank; (Rd) round; (Rk) 2nd use, player rank; (Ref) reference; (F) final; (SF) semifinal; (QF) quarterfinal; (#R) rounds 4, 3, 2, 1; (RR) round-robin stage; (Q#) qualifying rounds or stages (3), 2, 1.

==== Singles ====
Result	W–L	Opponent	Rk	Tournament	Surface	Rd	Score	Rk	Ref
Loss	0–1	(United States) Coco Gauff	4	United Cup, Australia	Hard	SF	4–6, 2–6	2	
Loss	0–2	(Kazakhstan) Elena Rybakina	5	Australian Open, Australia	Hard	QF	5–7, 1–6	2	
Loss	0–3	(Ukraine) Elina Svitolina	9	Indian Wells Open, United States	Hard	QF	2–6, 6–4, 4–6	2	
Loss	0–4	Mirra Andreeva	9	Stuttgart Open, Germany	Clay (i)	QF	6–3, 4–6, 3–6	4	
Win	1–4	(United States) Jessica Pegula	5	Italian Open, Italy	Clay	QF	6–1, 6–2	3	
Loss	1–5	(Ukraine) Elina Svitolina	10	Italian Open, Italy	Clay	SF	4–6, 6–2, 2–6	3	
Win	2–5	(Ukraine) Elina Svitolina	9	Canadian Open, Canada	Hard	SF	6–3, 1–6, 6–3	8	
Win	3–5	(Kazakhstan) Elena Rybakina	2	Canadian Open, Canada	Hard	F	6–2, 6–3	8	
Win	4–5	(Kazakhstan) Elena Rybakina	2	Cincinnati Open, United States	Hard	QF	4–1 ret.	5	
Loss	4–6	(United States) Jessica Pegula	3	Cincinnati Open, United States	Hard	SF	5–7, 6–4, 4–6	5	

=== Finals ===
==== Singles: 1 (1 title) ====
Legend Grand Slam tournaments (0–0) WTA Tour Championships (0–0) WTA 1000 (1–0) WTA 500 (0–0) WTA 250 (0–0)	Finals by surface Hard (1–0) Clay (0–0) Grass (0–0)	Finals by setting Outdoor (1–0) Indoor (0–0)

Result	W–L	Date	Tournament	Tier	Surface	Opponent	Score
Win	1–0	Aug 2026	Canadian Open, United States	WTA 1000	Hard	(Kazakhstan) Elena Rybakina	6–2, 6–3

=== Earnings ===
#	Tournament	Singles Prize money	Doubles Prize money	Mixed doubles Prize money	Year-to-date
1.	United Cup	$486,900	$0	$0	$486,900
2.	Australian Open	$485,565	$0	$0	$972,465
3.	Qatar Open	$98,500	$0	$0	$1,070,965
4.	Indian Wells Open	$154,210	$0	$0	$1,225,175
5.	Miami Open	$36,110	$0	$0	$1,261,285
6.	Stuttgart Open	$35,000	$0	$0	$1,296,285
7.	Madrid Open	$54,110	$0	$0	$1,350,395
8.	Italian Open	$297,315	$0	$0	$1,647,710
9.	French Open	$332,504	$0	$0	$1,980,214
10.	Bad Homburg Open	$18,045	$0	$0	$1,998,259
11.	Wimbledon Championships	$247,800	$0	$0	$2,246,059
12.	Canadian Open	$1,085,220	$0	$0	$3,331,279
13.	Cincinnati Open	$297,315	$0	$0	$3,628,594
14.	US Open	$480,000	$0	$0	$4,108,594
15.	China Open	$193,645	$0	$0	$4,302,239
16.	Wuhan Open	$197,000	$0	$0	$4,499,239
**Total prize money**		**$4,499,239**	**$0**	**$0**	**$4,499,239**

== See also ==
- 2026 Mirra Andreeva tennis season
- 2026 Coco Gauff tennis season
- 2026 Elena Rybakina tennis season
- 2026 Aryna Sabalenka tennis season
