= 2026 Qatar TotalEnergies Open – Doubles =

Doubles
- 2026 Qatar TotalEnergies Open

Final
- Champions: (Kazakhstan) Anna Danilina (Serbia) Aleksandra Krunić
- Runners-up: (Chinese Taipei) Hsieh Su-wei (Latvia) Jeļena Ostapenko
- Score: 0–6, 7–6^{(7–3)}, [10–8]

Details
- Draw: 28
- Seeds: 8

Events
Singles	Doubles
- WTA Qatar Open

Anna Danilina and Aleksandra Krunić defeated Hsieh Su-wei and Jeļena Ostapenko in the final, 0–6, 7–6^{(7–3)}, [10–8] to win the doubles tennis title at the 2026 WTA Qatar Open. They saved a championship point en route to Krunić's first WTA 1000 title, and Danilina's second.

Sara Errani and Jasmine Paolini were the defending champions, but lost in the semifinals to Hsieh and Ostapenko.

== Seeds ==
The top four seeds received a bye into the second round.

1. (Italy) Sara Errani / (Italy) Jasmine Paolini (semifinals)
2. (Belgium) Elise Mertens / (China) Zhang Shuai (withdrew)
3. (Chinese Taipei) Hsieh Su-wei / (Latvia) Jeļena Ostapenko (final)
4. (Kazakhstan) Anna Danilina / (Serbia) Aleksandra Krunić (champions)
5. (Canada) Gabriela Dabrowski / (Brazil) Luisa Stefani (semifinals)
6. (United States) Asia Muhammad / (New Zealand) Erin Routliffe (first round)
7. (Spain) Cristina Bucșa / (United States) Nicole Melichar-Martinez (quarterfinals)
8. (Australia) Ellen Perez / (Netherlands) Demi Schuurs (second round)

== Draw ==
Key

- Q = Qualifier
- WC = Wild card
- LL = Lucky loser
- Alt = Alternate
- ITF = ITF entry
- PR = Protected ranking
- SR = Special ranking
- SE = Special exempt
- JE = Junior exempt
- JR = Junior Accelerator Programme entrant
- CO = College Accelerator Programme entrant
- NG = Next Gen Accelerator Program entrant
- w/o = Walkover
- r = Retired
- d = Defaulted

=== Finals ===
Semifinals
1	(Italy) Sara Errani (Italy) Jasmine Paolini	5	6	[6]
3	(Chinese Taipei) Hsieh Su-wei (Latvia) Jeļena Ostapenko	7	3	[10]
4	(Kazakhstan) Anna Danilina (Serbia) Aleksandra Krunić	6	6
5	(Canada) Gabriela Dabrowski (Brazil) Luisa Stefani	3	4

Final
3	(Chinese Taipei) Hsieh Su-wei (Latvia) Jeļena Ostapenko	6	6^{3}	[8]
4	(Kazakhstan) Anna Danilina (Serbia) Aleksandra Krunić	0	7^{7}	[10]

=== Top half ===
First round
(Norway) U Eikeri (China) X Jiang	6	6
WC	(Qatar) M Al-Naimi (France) E Jacquemot	1	1
PR	(Germany) L Siegemund; V Zvonareva	6	6
(Ukraine) L Kichenok (Ukraine) N Kichenok	2	3
(United States) C Gauff (Canada) V Mboko	6	4	[9]
7	(Spain) C Bucșa (United States) N Melichar-Martinez	4	6	[11]
PR	(Croatia) D Jurak Schreiber (Belgium) M Kempen	5	1
PR	(Slovenia) A Klepač (Poland) K Piter	7	6
(Japan) E Hozumi (Chinese Taipei) F-h Wu	3	2
(Slovakia) T Mihalíková (United Kingdom) O Nicholls	6	6
(Czech Republic) B Krejčíková (Czech Republic) K Siniaková	6	6
6	(United States) A Muhammad (New Zealand) E Routliffe	4	1

Second round
1	(Italy) S Errani (Italy) J Paolini	6	6
(Norway) U Eikeri (China) X Jiang	3	1
PR	(Germany) L Siegemund; V Zvonareva	2	4
7	(Spain) C Bucșa (United States) N Melichar-Martinez	6	6
3	(Chinese Taipei) S-w Hsieh (Latvia) J Ostapenko	6	6
PR	(Slovenia) A Klepač (Poland) K Piter	3	3
(Slovakia) T Mihalíková (United Kingdom) O Nicholls	6	2	[10]
(Czech Republic) B Krejčíková (Czech Republic) K Siniaková	4	6	[5]

Quarterfinals
1	(Italy) S Errani (Italy) J Paolini	6	1	[10]
7	(Spain) C Bucșa (United States) N Melichar-Martinez	2	6	3
3	(Chinese Taipei) S-w Hsieh (Latvia) J Ostapenko	6	6
(Slovakia) T Mihalíková (United Kingdom) O Nicholls	1	2

Semifinals
1	(Italy) S Errani (Italy) J Paolini	5	6	[6]
3	(Chinese Taipei) S-w Hsieh (Latvia) J Ostapenko	7	3	[10]

=== Bottom half ===
First round
8	(Australia) E Perez (Netherlands) D Schuurs	6	6
(United States) S Kenin (United States) D Krawczyk	3	2
(Australia) S Hunter (Australia) M Joint	4	6	[10]
(China) Y Xu (China) Z Yang	6	2	[6]
WC	(Canada) L Fernandez (France) K Mladenovic	7	7^{7}
WC	(China) Xin Wang (China) S Zheng	5	6^{2}
5	(Canada) G Dabrowski (Brazil) L Stefani	7	6
I Khromacheva (Indonesia) A Sutjiadi	5	2
(Czech Republic) L Nosková (Czech Republic) T Valentová	6	4	[8]
(Czech Republic) M Bouzková; L Samsonova	4	6	[10]
(Japan) M Kato (Hungary) F Stollár	3	6	[7]
A Panova; D Shnaider	6	2	[10]

Second round
8	(Australia) E Perez (Netherlands) D Schuurs	3	7^{10}	[4]
(Australia) S Hunter (Australia) M Joint	6	6^{8}	[10]
WC	(Canada) L Fernandez (France) K Mladenovic	2	6	[4]
4	(Kazakhstan) A Danilina (Serbia) A Krunić	6	4	[10]
5	(Canada) G Dabrowski (Brazil) L Stefani	6	6
(Czech Republic) M Bouzková; L Samsonova	3	4
A Panova; D Shnaider	1	3
Alt	(Chinese Taipei) H-c Chan (Denmark) C Tauson	6	6

Quarterfinals
(Australia) S Hunter (Australia) M Joint	2	6	[4]
4	(Kazakhstan) A Danilina (Serbia) A Krunić	6	4	[10]
5	(Canada) G Dabrowski (Brazil) L Stefani	6	6
Alt	(Chinese Taipei) H-c Chan (Denmark) C Tauson	1	3

Semifinals
4	(Kazakhstan) A Danilina (Serbia) A Krunić	6	6
5	(Canada) G Dabrowski (Brazil) L Stefani	3	4
