= 2026 Berlin Tennis Open =

- Date: 15–22 June
- Edition: 103rd
- Category: WTA 500
- Draw: 28S / 24Q / 16D
- Surface: Grass
- Location: Berlin, Germany
- Venue: Rot-Weiss Tennis Club

Champions

Singles
- (Czech Republic) Linda Nosková

Doubles
- Ekaterina Alexandrova / (Czech Republic) Linda Nosková
- German Open (WTA)

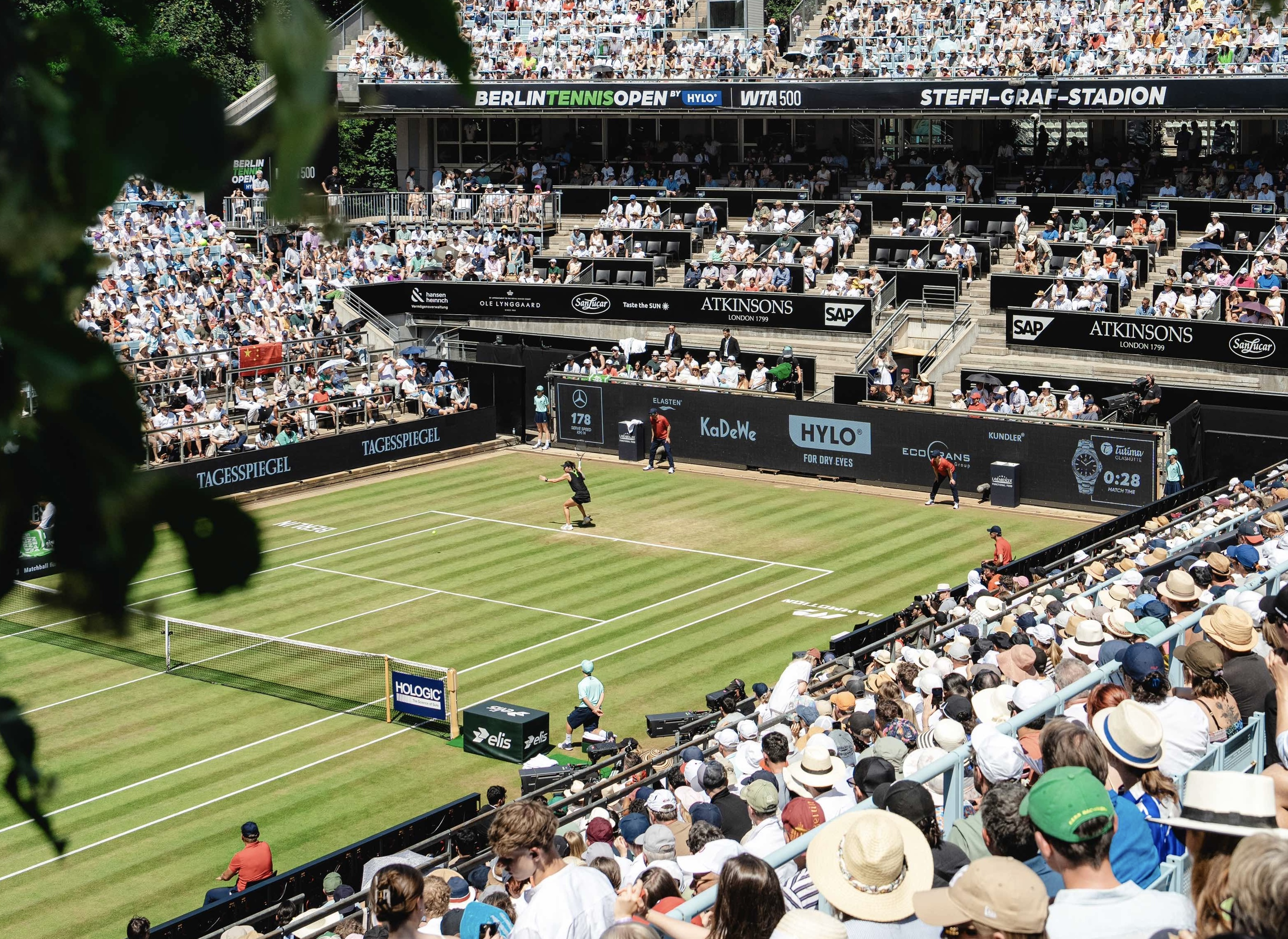
The Berlin tennis tournament in 2025

The 2026 Vanda Pharmaceuticals Berlin Tennis Open was a professional women's tennis tournament played on outdoor grass courts at the Rot-Weiss Tennis Club in Berlin, Germany from 15 June to 22 June 2026. It was the 103rd edition of the WTA German Open classed as a WTA 500 on the 2026 WTA Tour.

== Champions ==
=== Singles ===
- (Czech Republic) Linda Nosková def. (United States) Jessica Pegula, 6–4, 4–6, 6–3

=== Doubles ===
- Ekaterina Alexandrova / (Czech Republic) Linda Nosková def. (Italy) Sara Errani / (United States) Nicole Melichar-Martinez, 6–2, 6–4

== Singles main-draw entrants ==
=== Seeds ===
| Country | Player | Rank | Seed |
|---|---|---|---|
| | Aryna Sabalenka | 1 | 1 |
| KAZ | Elena Rybakina | 2 | 2 |
| USA | Jessica Pegula | 4 | 3 |
| ~~USA~~ | ~~Amanda Anisimova~~ | ~~5~~ | ~~4~~ |
| USA | Coco Gauff | 7 | 5 |
| UKR | Elina Svitolina | 8 | 6 |
| CZE | Karolína Muchová | 10 | 7 |
| CZE | Linda Nosková | 13 | 8 |
| | Diana Shnaider | 16 | 9 |

- Rankings are as of 8 June 2026.

=== Other entrants ===
The following players received wildcards into the singles main draw:

- (Spain) Paula Badosa
- (Czech Republic) Nikola Bartůňková
- (Philippines) Alexandra Eala
- (Germany) Eva Lys

The following player received entry as a special exempt:

- (Croatia) Donna Vekić

The following players received entry from the qualifying draw:

- (Netherlands) Suzan Lamens
- (Switzerland) Rebeka Masarova
- (France) Diane Parry
- (Czech Republic) Kateřina Siniaková
- (Mexico) Renata Zarazúa
- (China) Zhang Shuai

The following player received entry as a lucky loser:

- (Poland) Magdalena Fręch

=== Withdrawals ===
- Mirra Andreeva → replaced by Diana Shnaider
- (United States) Amanda Anisimova → replaced by (Poland) Magdalena Fręch
- (Switzerland) Belinda Bencic → replaced by (Belgium) Elise Mertens
- (Romania) Sorana Cîrstea → replaced by (China) Wang Xinyu
- (Canada) Victoria Mboko → replaced by (Austria) Anastasia Potapova
- (Italy) Jasmine Paolini → replaced by Anna Kalinskaya

== Doubles main draw entrants ==
=== Seeds ===
| Country | Player | Country | Player | Rank | Seed |
|---|---|---|---|---|---|
| KAZ | Anna Danilina | SRB | Aleksandra Krunić | 11 | 1 |
| BEL | Elise Mertens | CHN | Zhang Shuai | 12 | 2 |
| ITA | Sara Errani | USA | Nicole Melichar-Martinez | 27 | 3 |
| AUS | Ellen Perez | NED | Demi Schuurs | 43 | 4 |

- Rankings are as of 8 June 2026.

=== Other entrants ===
The following pair received a wildcard into the doubles main draw:

- (Czech Republic) Karolína Muchová / (United States) Serena Williams
