= 2026 Berlin Tennis Open – Doubles =

Doubles
- 2026 Berlin Tennis Open

Final
- Champion: Ekaterina Alexandrova (Czech Republic) Linda Nosková
- Runner-up: (Italy) Sara Errani (United States) Nicole Melichar-Martinez
- Score: 6–2, 6–4

Details
- Draw: 16
- Seeds: 4

Events
Singles	Doubles
- German Open (WTA)

Ekaterina Alexandrova and Linda Nosková defeated Sara Errani and Nicole Melichar-Martinez in the final, 6−2, 6−4 to win the doubles title at the 2026 Berlin Tennis Open. Nosková was the first player to win both the singles and doubles titles in the same year since Conchita Martínez in 2000.

Tereza Mihalíková and Olivia Nicholls were the defending champions, but lost in the first round to Elise Mertens and Zhang Shuai.

== Seeds ==
1. (Kazakhstan) Anna Danilina / (Serbia) Aleksandra Krunić (first round)
2. (Belgium) Elise Mertens / (China) Zhang Shuai (quarterfinals)
3. (Italy) Sara Errani / (United States) Nicole Melichar-Martinez (final)
4. (Australia) Ellen Perez / (Netherlands) Demi Schuurs (first round)

== Draw ==
Key

- Q = Qualifier
- WC = Wild card
- LL = Lucky loser
- Alt = Alternate
- ITF = ITF entry
- PR = Protected ranking
- SR = Special ranking
- SE = Special exempt
- JE = Junior exempt
- JR = Junior Accelerator Programme entrant
- CO = College Accelerator Programme entrant
- NG = Next Gen Accelerator Program entrant
- w/o = Walkover
- r = Retired
- d = Defaulted

First round
1	(Kazakhstan) A Danilina (Serbia) A Krunić	6	6^{6}	[6]
(United States) A Muhammad (Hungary) F Stollár	3	7^{8}	[10]
(United States) C Gauff (United States) J Pegula	7^{7}	6
(Austria) A Potapova; D Shnaider	6^{4}	4
3	(Italy) S Errani (United States) N Melichar-Martinez	6	7
(China) X Jiang (China) Y Xu	2	5
WC	(Czech Republic) K Muchová (United States) S Williams	4	4
(Mexico) G Olmos (New Zealand) E Routliffe	6	6
(Czech Republic) A Dețiuc; I Khromacheva	4	5
(Ukraine) L Kichenok (United States) D Krawczyk	6	7
E Alexandrova (Czech Republic) L Nosková	7^{7}	7
4	(Australia) E Perez (Netherlands) D Schuurs	6^{2}	5
(Netherlands) I Haverlag (Brazil) I Martins	3	2
(Norway) U Eikeri (United States) Q Gleason	6	6
(Slovakia) T Mihalíková (United Kingdom) O Nicholls	1	5
2	(Belgium) E Mertens (China) S Zhang	6	7

Quarterfinals
(United States) A Muhammad (Hungary) F Stollár	6	3	[10]
(United States) C Gauff (United States) J Pegula	2	6	[8]
3	(Italy) S Errani (United States) N Melichar-Martinez	6	6
(Mexico) G Olmos (New Zealand) E Routliffe	2	1
(Ukraine) L Kichenok (United States) D Krawczyk	3	3
E Alexandrova (Czech Republic) L Nosková	6	6
(Norway) U Eikeri (United States) Q Gleason	7^{7}	7
2	(Belgium) E Mertens (China) S Zhang	6^{4}	5

Semifinals
(United States) A Muhammad (Hungary) F Stollár	3	4
3	(Italy) S Errani (United States) N Melichar-Martinez	6	6
E Alexandrova (Czech Republic) L Nosková	6	7^{9}
(Norway) U Eikeri (United States) Q Gleason	3	6^{7}

Finals
3	(Italy) S Errani (United States) N Melichar-Martinez	2	4
E Alexandrova (Czech Republic) L Nosková	6	6
