= 2026 Cincinnati Open – Women's doubles =

Women's doubles
- 2026 Cincinnati Open

Final
- Champions: (Czech Republic) Marie Bouzková (Czech Republic) Linda Nosková
- Runners-up: (Belgium) Magali Kempen; Alexandra Panova
- Score: 6–1, 6–2
- Date: 22 August 2026

Details
- Draw: 32 (3 WC )
- Seeds: 8

Events
Singles	men	women
Doubles	men	women
- Cincinnati Open

Marie Bouzková and Linda Nosková defeated Magali Kempen and Alexandra Panova in the final, 6–1, 6–2 to win the women's doubles tennis title at the 2026 Cincinnati Open.

Gabriela Dabrowski and Erin Routliffe were the defending champions, but chose not to compete together this year. Dabrowski partnered Barbora Krejčíková, but lost in the second round to Bouzková and Nosková. Routliffe partnered Aldila Sutjiadi, but lost in the quarterfinals to Bouzková and Nosková.

== Seeds ==
1. (Czech Republic) Kateřina Siniaková / (United States) Taylor Townsend (second round)
2. (Kazakhstan) Anna Danilina / (Serbia) Aleksandra Krunić (second round)
3. (China) Guo Hanyu / (France) Kristina Mladenovic (quarterfinals)
4. (Spain) Cristina Bucșa / (United States) Nicole Melichar-Martinez (first round)
5. (Chinese Taipei) Hsieh Su-wei / (Latvia) Jeļena Ostapenko (semifinals)
6. (China) Jiang Xinyu / (China) Zhang Shuai (quarterfinals)
7. (New Zealand) Erin Routliffe / (Indonesia) Aldila Sutjiadi (quarterfinals)
8. (Belgium) Elise Mertens / Diana Shnaider (first round)

== Draw ==
Key

- Q = Qualifier
- WC = Wild card
- LL = Lucky loser
- Alt = Alternate
- ITF = ITF entry
- PR = Protected ranking
- SR = Special ranking
- SE = Special exempt
- JE = Junior exempt
- JR = Junior Accelerator Programme entrant
- CO = College Accelerator Programme entrant
- NG = Next Gen Accelerator Program entrant
- w/o = Walkover
- r = Retired
- d = Defaulted

=== Finals ===
Semifinals
(United States) Iva Jovic (United States) Caty McNally	3	2
(Czech Republic) Marie Bouzková (Czech Republic) Linda Nosková	6	6
5	(Chinese Taipei) Hsieh Su-wei (Latvia) Jeļena Ostapenko	3	5
(Belgium) Magali Kempen; Alexandra Panova	6	7

Final
(Czech Republic) Marie Bouzková (Czech Republic) Linda Nosková	6	6
(Belgium) Magali Kempen; Alexandra Panova	1	2

=== Top half ===
First round
1	(Czech Republic) K Siniaková (United States) T Townsend	6	4	[10]
PR	(Croatia) D Jurak Schreiber (Chinese Taipei) F-h Wu	2	6	[7]
(United States) I Jovic (United States) C McNally	6	5	[10]
(China) Q Tang (China) Y Xu	3	7	[7]
(Australia) E Perez (Netherlands) D Schuurs	2	6	[7]
(Norway) U Eikeri (United States) Q Gleason	6	1	[10]
(Poland) K Piter (Indonesia) J Tjen	5	7^{7}	[7]
6	(China) X Jiang (China) S Zhang	7	6^{2}	[10]
4	(Spain) C Bucșa (United States) N Melichar-Martinez	3	6	[4]
(Canada) G Dabrowski (Czech Republic) B Krejčíková	6	1	[10]
(Czech Republic) M Bouzková (Czech Republic) L Nosková	6	6
WC	(United States) C Dolehide (United States) E Navarro	4	4
(Japan) S Aoyama (Chinese Taipei) E-s Liang	6	7
PR	(Estonia) I Neel (Mexico) G Olmos	2	5
(United States) A Muhammad (Hungary) F Stollár	5	5
7	(New Zealand) E Routliffe (Indonesia) A Sutjiadi	7	7

Second round
1	(Czech Republic) K Siniaková (United States) T Townsend	7	4	[8]
(United States) I Jovic (United States) C McNally	5	6	[10]
(Norway) U Eikeri (United States) Q Gleason	1	2
6	(China) X Jiang (China) S Zhang	6	6
(Canada) G Dabrowski (Czech Republic) B Krejčíková	3	6	[7]
(Czech Republic) M Bouzková (Czech Republic) L Nosková	6	1	[10]
(Japan) S Aoyama (Chinese Taipei) E-s Liang	3	2
7	(New Zealand) E Routliffe (Indonesia) A Sutjiadi	6	6

Quarterfinals
(United States) I Jovic (United States) C McNally	7^{10}	3	[10]
6	(China) X Jiang (China) S Zhang	6^{8}	6	[6]
(Czech Republic) M Bouzková (Czech Republic) L Nosková	7	7
7	(New Zealand) E Routliffe (Indonesia) A Sutjiadi	5	5

Semifinals
(United States) I Jovic (United States) C McNally	3	2
(Czech Republic) M Bouzková (Czech Republic) L Nosková	6	6

=== Bottom half ===
First round
5	(Chinese Taipei) S-w Hsieh (Latvia) J Ostapenko	7^{7}	6
(Slovakia) T Mihalíková (United Kingdom) O Nicholls	6^{2}	3
PR	(Slovenia) A Klepač (United Kingdom) M Lumsden	6	6
(Czech Republic) A Dețiuc; I Khromacheva	3	3
WC	(Ukraine) M Kostyuk (United States) P Stearns	6	1	[10]
WC	(United States) S Williams (United States) V Williams	2	6	[8]
(Japan) M Kato (Ukraine) L Kichenok	4	2
3	(China) H Guo (France) K Mladenovic	6	6
8	(Belgium) E Mertens; D Shnaider	6^{4}	6	[3]
(Chinese Taipei) H-c Chan (Australia) M Joint	7^{7}	3	[10]
Alt	(Germany) T Korpatsch (United Kingdom) E Webley-Smith	2	6^{2}
(Italy) S Errani (Canada) L Fernandez	6	7^{7}
(Australia) S Hunter (United States) D Krawczyk	3	4
(Belgium) M Kempen; A Panova	6	6
(United States) A Li (Denmark) C Tauson	4	2
2	(Kazakhstan) A Danilina (Serbia) A Krunić	6	6

Second round
5	(Chinese Taipei) S-w Hsieh (Latvia) J Ostapenko	6	2
PR	(Slovenia) A Klepač (United Kingdom) M Lumsden	3	1^{r}
WC	(Ukraine) M Kostyuk (United States) P Stearns	6	3	[6]
3	(China) H Guo (France) K Mladenovic	3	6	[10]
(Chinese Taipei) H-c Chan (Australia) M Joint	7^{7}	6
(Italy) S Errani (Canada) L Fernandez	6^{4}	1
(Belgium) M Kempen; A Panova	6	6
2	(Kazakhstan) A Danilina (Serbia) A Krunić	3	2

Quarterfinals
5	(Chinese Taipei) S-w Hsieh (Latvia) J Ostapenko	6	6
3	(China) H Guo (France) K Mladenovic	3	4
(Chinese Taipei) H-c Chan (Australia) M Joint	6	4	[2]
(Belgium) M Kempen; A Panova	1	6	[10]

Semifinals
5	(Chinese Taipei) S-w Hsieh (Latvia) J Ostapenko	3	5
(Belgium) M Kempen; A Panova	6	7

== Seeded teams ==
The following are the seeded teams. Seedings are based on WTA rankings as of August 3, 2026.

Country	Player	Country	Player	Rank	Seed
CZE	Kateřina Siniaková	USA	Taylor Townsend	3	1
KAZ	Anna Danilina	SRB	Aleksandra Krunic	11	2
CHN	Guo Hanyu	FRA	Kristina Mladenovic	23	3
ESP	Cristina Bucșa	USA	Nicole Melichar-Martinez	28	4
TPE	Hsieh Su-wei	LAT	Jeļena Ostapenko	32	5
CHN	Jiang Xinyu	CHN	Zhang Shuai	34	6
NZL	Erin Routliffe	INA	Aldila Sutjiadi	36	7
BEL	Elise Mertens		Diana Shnaider	39	8

== Other entry information ==
=== Wildcards ===
- (United States) Caroline Dolehide / (United States) Emma Navarro
- (Ukraine) Marta Kostyuk / (United States) Peyton Stearns
- (United States) Serena Williams / (United States) Venus Williams

=== Protected ranking ===
- (Croatia) Darija Jurak Schreiber / (Chinese Taipei) Wu Fang-hsien
- (Slovenia) Andreja Klepač / (United Kingdom) Maia Lumsden
- (Estonia) Ingrid Neel / (Mexico) Giuliana Olmos

=== Alternates ===
- (Germany) Tamara Korpatsch / (United Kingdom) Emily Webley-Smith

=== WIthdrawals ===
- Mirra Andreeva / (Romania) Sorana Cîrstea → replaced by (Germany) Tamara Korpatsch / (United Kingdom) Emily Webley-Smith
