= 2026 Berlin Tennis Open – Singles =

Singles
- 2026 Berlin Tennis Open

Final
- Champion: (Czech Republic) Linda Nosková
- Runner-up: (United States) Jessica Pegula
- Score: 6–4, 4–6, 6–3

Details
- Draw: 28 (6 Q / 4 WC )
- Seeds: 8

Events
Singles	Doubles
- German Open (WTA)

Linda Nosková defeated Jessica Pegula in the final, 6–4, 4–6, 6–3 to win the singles tennis title at the 2026 Berlin Tennis Open. It was her second WTA Tour title, with her first was 2024 Monterrey Open. By winning the tournament, Nosková made her top 10 debut in the WTA rankings. Nosková was the first player to win both the singles and doubles titles in the same year since Conchita Martínez in 2000.

Markéta Vondroušová was the reigning champion, but did not participate this year.

== Seeds ==
The top four seeds received a bye into the second round.

1. Aryna Sabalenka (semifinals)
2. (Kazakhstan) Elena Rybakina (second round)
3. (United States) Jessica Pegula (final)
4. (United States) Amanda Anisimova (withdrew)
5. (United States) Coco Gauff (second round)
6. (Ukraine) Elina Svitolina (quarterfinals)
7. (Czech Republic) Karolína Muchová (second round)
8. (Czech Republic) Linda Nosková (champion)
9. Diana Shnaider (first round)

== Draw ==
Key

- Q = Qualifier
- WC = Wild card
- LL = Lucky loser
- Alt = Alternate
- ITF = ITF entry
- PR = Protected ranking
- SR = Special ranking
- SE = Special exempt
- JE = Junior exempt
- JR = Junior Accelerator Programme entrant
- CO = College Accelerator Programme entrant
- NG = Next Gen Accelerator Program entrant
- w/o = Walkover
- r = Retired
- d = Defaulted

=== Finals ===
Semifinals
1	Aryna Sabalenka	4	7^{7}	0
3	(United States) Jessica Pegula	6	6^{4}	6
8	(Czech Republic) Linda Nosková	6	6
WC	(Philippines) Alexandra Eala	2	4

Final
3	(United States) Jessica Pegula	4	6	3
8	(Czech Republic) Linda Nosková	6	4	6

=== Top half ===
First round
E Alexandrova	6	0
(Austria) A Potapova	1	0^{r}
(Belgium) E Mertens	1	6	6
L Samsonova	6	3	0
WC	(Czech Republic) N Bartůňková	6	6^{2}	6
9	D Shnaider	2	7^{7}	3
Q	(Czech Republic) K Siniaková	6	6
Q	(Switzerland) R Masarova	2	4
(United States) M Keys	7^{7}	6
(China) Xin Wang	6^{3}	1
Q	(China) S Zhang	1	3
7	(Czech Republic) K Muchová	6	6

Second round
1	A Sabalenka	6	6
E Alexandrova	4	4
(Belgium) E Mertens	1	4
WC	(Czech Republic) N Bartůňková	6	6
3	(United States) J Pegula	6	6
Q	(Czech Republic) K Siniaková	2	4
(United States) M Keys	6	7
7	(Czech Republic) K Muchová	4	5

Quarterfinals
1	A Sabalenka	2	7^{7}	6
WC	(Czech Republic) N Bartůňková	6	6^{2}	4
3	(United States) J Pegula	7^{7}	7^{10}
(United States) M Keys	6^{5}	6^{8}

Semifinals
1	A Sabalenka	4	7^{7}	0
3	(United States) J Pegula	6	6^{4}	6

=== Bottom half ===
First round
8	(Czech Republic) L Nosková	6	6
Q	(Mexico) R Zarazúa	1	4
(Denmark) C Tauson	3	4
Q	(France) D Parry	6	6
Q	(Netherlands) S Lamens	3	2
WC	(Spain) P Badosa	6	6
6	(Ukraine) E Svitolina	6	4
A Kalinskaya	1	1^{r}
LL	(Poland) M Fręch	6^{7}	3
WC	(Germany) E Lys	7^{9}	6
SE	(Croatia) D Vekić	5	4
WC	(Philippines) A Eala	7	6

Second round
8	(Czech Republic) L Nosková	6	6
Q	(France) D Parry	2	2
WC	(Spain) P Badosa	1	6	6
5	(United States) C Gauff	6	3	2
6	(Ukraine) E Svitolina	6	6
WC	(Germany) E Lys	3	2
WC	(Philippines) A Eala	7	6
2	(Kazakhstan) E Rybakina	5	4

Quarterfinals
8	(Czech Republic) L Nosková	6	6
WC	(Spain) P Badosa	1	3
6	(Ukraine) E Svitolina	3	4
WC	(Philippines) A Eala	6	6

Semifinals
8	(Czech Republic) L Nosková	6	6
WC	(Philippines) A Eala	2	4

== Qualifying ==
=== Seeds ===
1. (China) Wang Xinyu (moved into main draw)
2. (Czech Republic) Kateřina Siniaková (qualified)
3. (Poland) Magdalena Fręch (qualifying competition, lucky loser)
4. (Croatia) Petra Marčinko (qualifying competition)
5. (France) Diane Parry (qualified)
6. (Czech Republic) Nikola Bartůňková (received wildcard into main draw)
7. (China) Zhang Shuai (qualified)
8. (Ukraine) Anhelina Kalinina (qualifying competition)
9. (Mexico) Renata Zarazúa (qualified)
10. (Germany) Tamara Korpatsch (first round)
11. (United States) Alycia Parks (first round)
12. (Austria) Sinja Kraus (first round)

=== Qualifiers ===
1. (Netherlands) Suzan Lamens
2. (Czech Republic) Kateřina Siniaková
3. (China) Zhang Shuai
4. (Mexico) Renata Zarazúa
5. (France) Diane Parry
6. (Switzerland) Rebeka Masarova

=== Lucky loser ===
1. (Poland) Magdalena Fręch

=== Qualifying draw ===
==== First qualifier ====
First round
Alt	(Netherlands) Suzan Lamens	6	7^{7}
(Hungary) Dalma Gálfi	3	6^{4}
WC	(Germany) Tessa Brockmann	4	6	6
11	(United States) Alycia Parks	6	4	2

Qualifying competition
Alt	(Netherlands) Suzan Lamens	6	6
WC	(Germany) Tessa Brockmann	2	2

==== Second qualifier ====
First round
2	(Czech Republic) Kateřina Siniaková	6	6
(China) Yuan Yue	4	2
Alt	(China) Zhu Lin	6	6
12	(Austria) Sinja Kraus	2	3

Qualifying competition
2	(Czech Republic) Kateřina Siniaková	6	6
Alt	(China) Zhu Lin	4	2

==== Third qualifier ====
First round
3	(Poland) Magdalena Fręch	6^{3}	6	7^{7}
Aliaksandra Sasnovich	7^{7}	4	6^{4}
WC	(Germany) Milena Steinkamp	3	2
7	(China) Zhang Shuai	6	6

Qualifying competition
3	(Poland) Magdalena Fręch	2	4
7	(China) Zhang Shuai	6	6

==== Fourth qualifier ====
First round
4	(Croatia) Petra Marčinko	6	4	6
PR	(Japan) Aoi Ito	2	6	2
(Uzbekistan) Maria Timofeeva	5	2
9	(Mexico) Renata Zarazúa	7	6

Qualifying competition
4	(Croatia) Petra Marčinko	6	4	3
9	(Mexico) Renata Zarazúa	1	6	6

==== Fifth qualifier ====
First round
5	(France) Diane Parry	6	6
(Germany) Ella Seidel	3	4
(New Zealand) Lulu Sun	4	3
8	(Ukraine) Anhelina Kalinina	6	6

Qualifying competition
5	(France) Diane Parry	6	7
8	(Ukraine) Anhelina Kalinina	4	5

==== Sixth qualifier ====
First round
Alt	(Switzerland) Rebeka Masarova	4	6	6
WC	(Germany) Noma Noha Akugue	6	1	2
WC	(Slovakia) Mia Pohánková	6	7^{7}
10	(Germany) Tamara Korpatsch	2	6^{1}

Qualifying competition
Alt	(Switzerland) Rebeka Masarova	6	6
WC	(Slovakia) Mia Pohánková	1	4
