= 2026 Italian Open – Men's doubles =

Men's doubles
- 2026 Italian Open

Final
- Champions: (Italy) Simone Bolelli (Italy) Andrea Vavassori
- Runners-up: (Spain) Marcel Granollers (Argentina) Horacio Zeballos
- Score: 7–6^{(10–8)}, 6–7^{(3–7)}, [10–3]

Details
- Draw: 32
- Seeds: 8

Events
Singles	men	women
Doubles	men	women
- Italian Open

Simone Bolelli and Andrea Vavassori defeated Marcel Granollers and Horacio Zeballos in the final, 7–6^{(10–8)}, 6–7^{(3–7)}, [10–3] to win the men's doubles tennis title at the 2026 Italian Open. They became the first all-Italian men's team to win the tournament in the Open Era.

Marcelo Arévalo and Mate Pavić were the defending champions, but lost in the quarterfinals to Christian Harrison and Neal Skupski.

Skupski retained the ATP No. 1 doubles ranking after Zeballos lost in the final. The pair of Harri Heliövaara and Henry Patten was also in contention for the top ranking at the beginning of the tournament.

== Seeds ==
1. (Finland) Harri Heliövaara / (United Kingdom) Henry Patten (quarterfinals)
2. (Spain) Marcel Granollers / (Argentina) Horacio Zeballos (final)
3. (United Kingdom) Julian Cash / (United Kingdom) Lloyd Glasspool (first round)
4. (United States) Christian Harrison / (United Kingdom) Neal Skupski (semifinals)
5. (El Salvador) Marcelo Arévalo / (Croatia) Mate Pavić (quarterfinals)
6. (Germany) Kevin Krawietz / (Germany) Tim Pütz (second round)
7. (Italy) Simone Bolelli / (Italy) Andrea Vavassori (champions)
8. (Portugal) Francisco Cabral / (United Kingdom) Joe Salisbury (second round)

== Draw ==
Key

- Q = Qualifier
- WC = Wild card
- LL = Lucky loser
- Alt = Alternate
- ITF = ITF entry
- PR = Protected ranking
- SR = Special ranking
- SE = Special exempt
- JE = Junior exempt
- JR = Junior Accelerator Programme entrant
- CO = College Accelerator Programme entrant
- NG = Next Gen Accelerator Program entrant
- w/o = Walkover
- r = Retired
- d = Defaulted

=== Finals ===
Semifinals
7	(Italy) Simone Bolelli (Italy) Andrea Vavassori	7^{11}	3	[10]
4	(United States) Christian Harrison (United Kingdom) Neal Skupski	6^{9}	6	[6]
(United States) Austin Krajicek (Croatia) Nikola Mektić	7^{12}	5	[2]
2	(Spain) Marcel Granollers (Argentina) Horacio Zeballos	6^{10}	7	[10]

Final
7	(Italy) Simone Bolelli (Italy) Andrea Vavassori	7^{10}	6^{3}	[10]
2	(Spain) Marcel Granollers (Argentina) Horacio Zeballos	6^{8}	7^{7}	[3]

=== Top half ===
First round
1	(Finland) H Heliövaara (United Kingdom) H Patten	7^{9}	6
(United States) T Paul (United States) E Quinn	6^{7}	3
(France) T Arribagé (France) A Olivetti	6^{5}	6	[11]
(United States) A Michelsen (United States) L Tien	7^{7}	2	[13]
(Argentina) TM Etcheverry (Chile) A Tabilo	4	6	[5]
(Sweden) A Göransson (United States) E King	6	2	[10]
(India) Y Bhambri (New Zealand) M Venus	6	3	[8]
7	(Italy) S Bolelli (Italy) A Vavassori	2	6	[10]
4	(United States) C Harrison (United Kingdom) N Skupski	7	6
(Brazil) O Luz (Brazil) R Matos	5	3
(Germany) J Schnaitter (Germany) M Wallner	6	7
(Argentina) M González (Argentina) A Molteni	3	5
(Kazakhstan) A Bublik (Australia) M Polmans	3	3
(Monaco) H Nys (France) É Roger-Vasselin	6	6
(Brazil) M Melo (Germany) A Zverev	4	3
5	(El Salvador) M Arévalo (Croatia) M Pavić	6	6

Second round
1	(Finland) H Heliövaara (United Kingdom) H Patten	4	6	[10]
(United States) A Michelsen (United States) L Tien	6	4	[6]
(Sweden) A Göransson (United States) E King	6^{4}	6^{0}
7	(Italy) S Bolelli (Italy) A Vavassori	7^{7}	7^{7}
4	(United States) C Harrison (United Kingdom) N Skupski	6	5	[11]
(Germany) J Schnaitter (Germany) M Wallner	4	7	[9]
(Monaco) H Nys (France) É Roger-Vasselin	5	3
5	(El Salvador) M Arévalo (Croatia) M Pavić	7	6

Quarterfinals
1	(Finland) H Heliövaara (United Kingdom) H Patten	5	6^{4}
7	(Italy) S Bolelli (Italy) A Vavassori	7	7^{7}
4	(United States) C Harrison (United Kingdom) N Skupski	6	6
5	(El Salvador) M Arévalo (Croatia) M Pavić	4	4

Semifinals
7	(Italy) S Bolelli (Italy) A Vavassori	7^{11}	3	[10]
4	(United States) C Harrison (United Kingdom) N Skupski	6^{9}	6	[6]

=== Bottom half ===
First round
6	(Germany) K Krawietz (Germany) T Pütz	6	6
WC	(Italy) F Cobolli (Italy) L Sonego	3	2
WC	(Italy) F Forti (Italy) F Romano	6^{6}	5
(Austria) A Erler (Austria) L Miedler	7^{8}	7
(United States) A Krajicek (Croatia) N Mektić	7^{7}	6
(Argentina) F Cerúndolo (Italy) L Darderi	6^{3}	2
(United States) R Cash (United States) JJ Tracy	6	6
3	(United Kingdom) J Cash (United Kingdom) L Glasspool	3	4
8	(Portugal) F Cabral (United Kingdom) J Salisbury	6	6
Alt	(Czech Republic) A Pavlásek (Czech Republic) P Rikl	4	4
Alt	(United States) B Kittay (United States) R Seggerman	4	2
(France) S Doumbia (France) F Reboul	6	6
Alt	(United States) R Galloway (Mexico) S González	7^{7}	7^{7}
Alt	(Netherlands) S Arends (Netherlands) D Pel	6^{3}	6^{5}
WC	(Italy) G Cadenasso (Italy) J Vasamì	7^{8}	3	[10]
2	(Spain) M Granollers (Argentina) H Zeballos	6^{6}	6	[12]

Second round
6	(Germany) K Krawietz (Germany) T Pütz	6^{10}	6^{4}
(Austria) A Erler (Austria) L Miedler	7^{12}	7^{7}
(United States) A Krajicek (Croatia) N Mektić	6	3	[10]
(United States) R Cash (United States) JJ Tracy	4	6	[8]
8	(Portugal) F Cabral (United Kingdom) J Salisbury	5	3
(France) S Doumbia (France) F Reboul	7	6
Alt	(United States) R Galloway (Mexico) S González	2	2
2	(Spain) M Granollers (Argentina) H Zeballos	6	6

Quarterfinals
(Austria) A Erler (Austria) L Miedler	4	5
(United States) A Krajicek (Croatia) N Mektić	6	7
(France) S Doumbia (France) F Reboul	2	3
2	(Spain) M Granollers (Argentina) H Zeballos	6	6

Semifinals
(United States) A Krajicek (Croatia) N Mektić	7^{12}	5	[2]
2	(Spain) M Granollers (Argentina) H Zeballos	6^{10}	7	[10]

== Seeded teams ==
The following are the seeded teams. Seedings are based on ATP rankings as of May 4, 2026.

Country	Player	Country	Player	Rank	Seed
FIN	Harri Heliövaara	GBR	Henry Patten	6	1
ESP	Marcel Granollers	ARG	Horacio Zeballos	7	2
GBR	Julian Cash	GBR	Lloyd Glasspool	13	3
USA	Christian Harrison	GBR	Neal Skupski	13	4
ESA	Marcelo Arévalo	CRO	Mate Pavić	18	5
GER	Kevin Krawietz	GER	Tim Pütz	24	6
ITA	Simone Bolelli	ITA	Andrea Vavassori	29	7
POR	Francisco Cabral	GBR	Joe Salisbury	31	8

== Other entry information ==
=== Wildcards ===
- (Italy) Gianluca Cadenasso / (Italy) Jacopo Vasamì
- (Italy) Flavio Cobolli / (Italy) Lorenzo Sonego
- (Italy) Francesco Forti / (Italy) Filippo Romano

=== Alternates ===
- (Netherlands) Sander Arends / (Netherlands) David Pel
- (United States) Robert Galloway / (Mexico) Santiago González
- (United States) Benjamin Kittay / (United States) Ryan Seggerman
- (Czech Republic) Adam Pavlásek / (Czech Republic) Patrik Rikl
- ~~(Brazil) Fernando Romboli / (Australia) John-Patrick Smith~~

=== Withdrawals ===
- (Argentina) Guido Andreozzi / (France) Manuel Guinard → replaced by (United States) Benjamin Kittay / (United States) Ryan Seggerman
- (France) Térence Atmane / (France) Corentin Moutet → replaced by (Czech Republic) Adam Pavlásek / (Czech Republic) Patrik Rikl
- (Germany) Constantin Frantzen / (Poland) Jan Zieliński → replaced by (Netherlands) Sander Arends / (Netherlands) David Pel
- Karen Khachanov / Andrey Rublev → replaced by (United States) Robert Galloway / (Mexico) Santiago González
