= 2026 Cincinnati Open =

- Date: 13–23 August
- Edition: 125th (men) / 98th (women)
- Category: ATP Tour Masters 1000 (men); WTA 1000 (women)
- Surface: Hard
- Location: Mason, Ohio, U.S.
- Venue: Lindner Family Tennis Center

Champions

Men's singles
- (France) Arthur Fils

Women's singles
- (United States) Coco Gauff

Men's doubles
- (Brazil) Orlando Luz / (Brazil) Rafael Matos

Women's doubles
- (Czech Republic) Marie Bouzková / (Czech Republic) Linda Nosková
- Cincinnati Open

The 2026 Cincinnati Open was a combined men's and women's tennis tournament played on outdoor hardcourts from 13 to 23 August 2026. It is classified as a Masters 1000 tournament on the 2026 ATP Tour and a WTA 1000 tournament on the 2026 WTA Tour. The tournament was the 125th men's edition and the 98th women's edition of the Cincinnati Open. It took place at the Lindner Family Tennis Center in Mason, Ohio, a northern suburb of Cincinnati, in the United States.

== Champions ==
=== Men's singles ===
- (France) Arthur Fils def. (United States) Frances Tiafoe, 6–3, 1–6, 6–0

=== Women's singles ===
- (United States) Coco Gauff def. (United States) Jessica Pegula, 6–2, 6–4

=== Men's doubles ===
- (Brazil) Orlando Luz / (Brazil) Rafael Matos def. (Germany) Constantin Frantzen / (Netherlands) Robin Haase, 6–4, 3–6, [10–7]

=== Women's doubles ===
- (Czech Republic) Marie Bouzková / (Czech Republic) Linda Nosková def. (Belgium) Magali Kempen / Alexandra Panova, 6–1, 6–2

== Points and prize money ==
Event	W	F	SF	QF	R16	R32	R64	R128	Q	Q2	Q1
Men's singles	1000	650	400	200	100	50	30*	10**	20	10	0
Men's doubles	1000	600	360	180	90	0	—N/a	—N/a	—N/a	—N/a	—N/a
Women's singles	1000	650	390	215	120	65	35*	10	30	20	2
Women's doubles	1000	650	390	215	120	10	—N/a	—N/a	—N/a	—N/a	—N/a

* Players with byes receive first-round points.
** Singles players with wild cards earn 0 points.

=== Prize money ===
Event	W	F	SF	QF	Round of 16	Round of 32	Round of 64	Round of 128	Q2	Q1
Men's singles	$1,151,380	$612,340	$340,190	$193,645	$105,720	$61,865	$36,110	$24,335	$14,130	$7,330
Women's singles	$1,085,220	$564,920	$297,315	$154,210	$81,752	$47,375	$26,255	$16,260	$12,390	$6,505
Men's doubles*	$468,200	$247,870	$133,110	$66,570	$35,700	$19,510	—N/a	—N/a	—N/a	—N/a
Women's doubles*	$379,080	$200,690	$107,760	$53,900	$28,810	$15,800	—N/a	—N/a	—N/a	—N/a

_{*per team}
