= 2026 Qatar TotalEnergies Open =

- Date: 8–14 February 2026
- Edition: 24th
- Category: WTA 1000
- Draw: 56S / 28D
- Prize money: $4,088,211
- Surface: Hard / outdoor
- Location: Doha, Qatar
- Venue: Khalifa International Tennis and Squash Complex

Champions

Singles
- (Czech Republic) Karolína Muchová

Doubles
- (Kazakhstan) Anna Danilina / (Serbia) Aleksandra Krunić
- WTA Qatar Open

The 2026 Qatar TotalEnergies Open was a professional women's tennis tournament played on outdoor hard courts. It was the 24th edition of the WTA Qatar Open, and a WTA 1000 tournament on the 2026 WTA Tour. It took place at the International Tennis and Squash Complex in Doha, Qatar, from 8 to 14 February 2026.

== Champions ==
=== Singles ===
- (Czech Republic) Karolína Muchová def. (Canada) Victoria Mboko, 6–4, 7–5

=== Doubles ===
- (Kazakhstan) Anna Danilina / (Serbia) Aleksandra Krunić def. (Chinese Taipei) Hsieh Su-wei / (Latvia) Jeļena Ostapenko, 0–6, 7–6^{(7–3)}, [10–8]

== Points and prize money ==
=== Point distribution ===
Event	W	F	SF	QF	Round of 16	Round of 32	Round of 64	Q	Q2	Q1
Singles	1000	650	390	215	120	65*	10	30	20	2
Doubles	1000	650	390	215	120	10	—N/a	—N/a	—N/a	—N/a

=== Prize money ===
Event	W	F	SF	QF	R16	R32	R64	Q2	Q1
Singles	$665,000	$385,001	$197,000	$98,500	$49,250	$26,000	$18,300	$10,074	$5,270
Doubles**	$175,900	$98,950	$53,140	$27,480	$15,570	$10,380	—N/a	—N/a	—N/a

* Players with byes receive first-round points.
** Per team.

== Doubles main-draw entrants ==
=== Seeded teams ===
The following are the seeded teams. Seedings are based on WTA rankings as of 2 February 2026.

Country	Player	Country	Player	Rank	Seed
ITA	Sara Errani	ITA	Jasmine Paolini	6	1
~~BEL~~	~~Elise Mertens~~	~~CHN~~	~~Zhang Shuai~~	~~8~~	~~2~~
TPE	Hsieh Su-wei	LAT	Jeļena Ostapenko	20	3
KAZ	Anna Danilina	SRB	Aleksandra Krunić	24	4
CAN	Gabriela Dabrowski	BRA	Luisa Stefani	24	5
USA	Asia Muhammad	NZL	Erin Routliffe	27	6
ESP	Cristina Bucșa	USA	Nicole Melichar-Martinez	39	7
AUS	Ellen Perez	NED	Demi Schuurs	40	8

=== Other entrants ===
==== Wildcards ====
- (Qatar) Mubaraka Al-Naimi / (France) Elsa Jacquemot
- (Canada) Leylah Fernandez / (France) Kristina Mladenovic
- (China) Wang Xinyu / (China) Zheng Saisai

==== Protected ranking ====
- (Croatia) Darija Jurak Schreiber / (Belgium) Magali Kempen
- (Slovenia) Andreja Klepač / (Poland) Katarzyna Piter
- (Germany) Laura Siegemund / Vera Zvonareva

==== Alternates ====
- (Chinese Taipei) Chan Hao-ching / (Denmark) Clara Tauson

==== Withdrawals ====
- (Belgium) Elise Mertens / (China) Zhang Shuai → replaced by (Chinese Taipei) Chan Hao-ching / (Denmark) Clara Tauson
