= 2026 Mutua Madrid Open =

- Date: 21 April − 3 May
- Edition: 24th (men); 17th (women)
- Category: ATP 1000 (men); WTA 1000 (women)
- Draw: 96S / 32D
- Prize money: €8,235,540 (ATP) €8,235,540 (WTA)
- Surface: Clay / outdoor
- Location: Madrid, Spain
- Venue: Park Manzanares

Champions

Men's singles
- (Italy) Jannik Sinner

Women's singles
- (Ukraine) Marta Kostyuk

Men's doubles
- (Finland) Harri Heliövaara / (United Kingdom) Henry Patten

Women's doubles
- (Czech Republic) Kateřina Siniaková / (United States) Taylor Townsend
- Madrid Open

The 2026 Mutua Madrid Open was a professional tennis tournament played on outdoor clay courts at the Park Manzanares in Madrid, Spain from 21 April to 3 May 2026. It was the 24th edition of the event on the ATP Tour and 17th on the WTA Tour. It was classified as an ATP 1000 event on the 2026 ATP Tour and a WTA 1000 event on the 2026 WTA Tour.

== Champions ==
=== Men's singles ===
- (Italy) Jannik Sinner def. (Germany) Alexander Zverev, 6–1, 6–2

=== Women's singles ===
- (Ukraine) Marta Kostyuk def. Mirra Andreeva 6–3, 7–5

=== Men's doubles ===
- (Finland) Harri Heliövaara / (United Kingdom) Henry Patten def. (Argentina) Guido Andreozzi / (France) Manuel Guinard, 6–3, 3–6, [10–7]

=== Women's doubles ===
- (Czech Republic) Kateřina Siniaková / (United States) Taylor Townsend def. Mirra Andreeva / Diana Shnaider, 7–6^{(7–2)}, 6–2

== Point distribution ==
Event	W	F	SF	QF	R16	R32	R64	R128	Q	Q2	Q1
Men's singles	1000	650	400	200	100	50	30*	10	20	10	0
Men's doubles	1000	600	360	180	90	0	—N/a	—N/a	—N/a	—N/a	—N/a
Women's singles	1000	650	390	215	120	65	35*	10	30	20	2
Women's doubles	1000	650	390	215	120	10	—N/a	—N/a	—N/a	—N/a	—N/a

- Players with byes receive first-round points.

=== Prize money ===
Event	W	F	SF	QF	R16	R32	R64	R128	Q2	Q1
Men's singles	€1,007,165	€535,585	€297,550	€169,375	€92,470	€54,110	€31,585	€21,285	€12,360	€6,410
Women's singles	€1,007,165	€535,585	€297,550	€169,375	€92,470	€54,110	€31,585	€21,285	€12,360	€6,410
Men's doubles*	€409,520	€216,800	€116,430	€58,220	€31,220	€17,060	—N/a	—N/a	—N/a	—N/a
Women's doubles*	€409,520	€216,800	€116,430	€58,220	€31,220	€17,060	—N/a	—N/a	—N/a	—N/a

*per team

== Training ==
During the tournament, the pitch at the Bernabéu Stadium, Real Madrid CF’s stadium, was temporarily deactivated and, for the first time ever, converted into a clay tennis court, allowing the players that were participating at the tournament to train at the venue.
