= 2026 Italian Open =

- Date: 5–17 May 2026
- Edition: 83rd
- Category: ATP 1000 (men); WTA 1000 (women)
- Draw: 96S / 32D
- Surface: Clay / outdoor
- Location: Rome, Italy
- Venue: Foro Italico

Champions

Men's singles
- (Italy) Jannik Sinner

Women's singles
- (Ukraine) Elina Svitolina

Men's doubles
- (Italy) Simone Bolelli / (Italy) Andrea Vavassori

Women's doubles
- Mirra Andreeva / Diana Shnaider
- Italian Open

The 2026 Italian Open (also known as the Internazionali BNL d'Italia for sponsorship reasons) was a professional tennis tournament played on outdoor clay courts at the Foro Italico in Rome, Italy. It was the 83rd edition of the Italian Open and was classified as an ATP 1000 event on the 2026 ATP Tour and a WTA 1000 event on the 2026 WTA Tour. The event was held between 5 and 17 May 2026.

Italian Jasmine Paolini was the woman's singles defending champion, but lost in the round of sixteen against Elise Mertens in three sets. Paolini was also the defending champion in the women's doubles draw, alongside compatriot Sara Errani, but they didn't defend their title because they withdrew before their second match due to Paolini's foot injury.

Spanish Carlos Alcaraz was the defending champion of the men's singles draw, but due to a wrist injury, he withdrew from the tournament before it started.

== Champions ==
=== Men's singles ===
- (Italy) Jannik Sinner def. (Norway) Casper Ruud, 6–4, 6–4

=== Women's singles ===
- (Ukraine) Elina Svitolina def. (United States) Coco Gauff, 6–4, 6–7^{(3–7)}, 6–2

=== Men's doubles ===
- (Italy) Simone Bolelli / (Italy) Andrea Vavassori def. (Spain) Marcel Granollers / (Argentina) Horacio Zeballos, 7–6^{(10–8)}, 6–7^{(3–7)}, [10–3]

=== Women's doubles ===
- Mirra Andreeva / Diana Shnaider def. (Spain) Cristina Bucșa / (United States) Nicole Melichar-Martinez, 6–3, 6–3

== Point distribution ==
Event	W	F	SF	QF	R16	R32	R64	R128	Q	Q2	Q1
Men's singles	1000	650	400	200	100	50	30*	10	20	10	0
Men's doubles	1000	600	360	180	90	0	—N/a	—N/a	—N/a	—N/a	—N/a
Women's singles	1000	650	390	215	120	65	35*	10	30	20	2
Women's doubles	1000	650	390	215	120	10	—N/a	—N/a	—N/a	—N/a	—N/a

* Players with byes receive first-round points.
