= Linda Nosková =

Czech tennis player (born 2004)

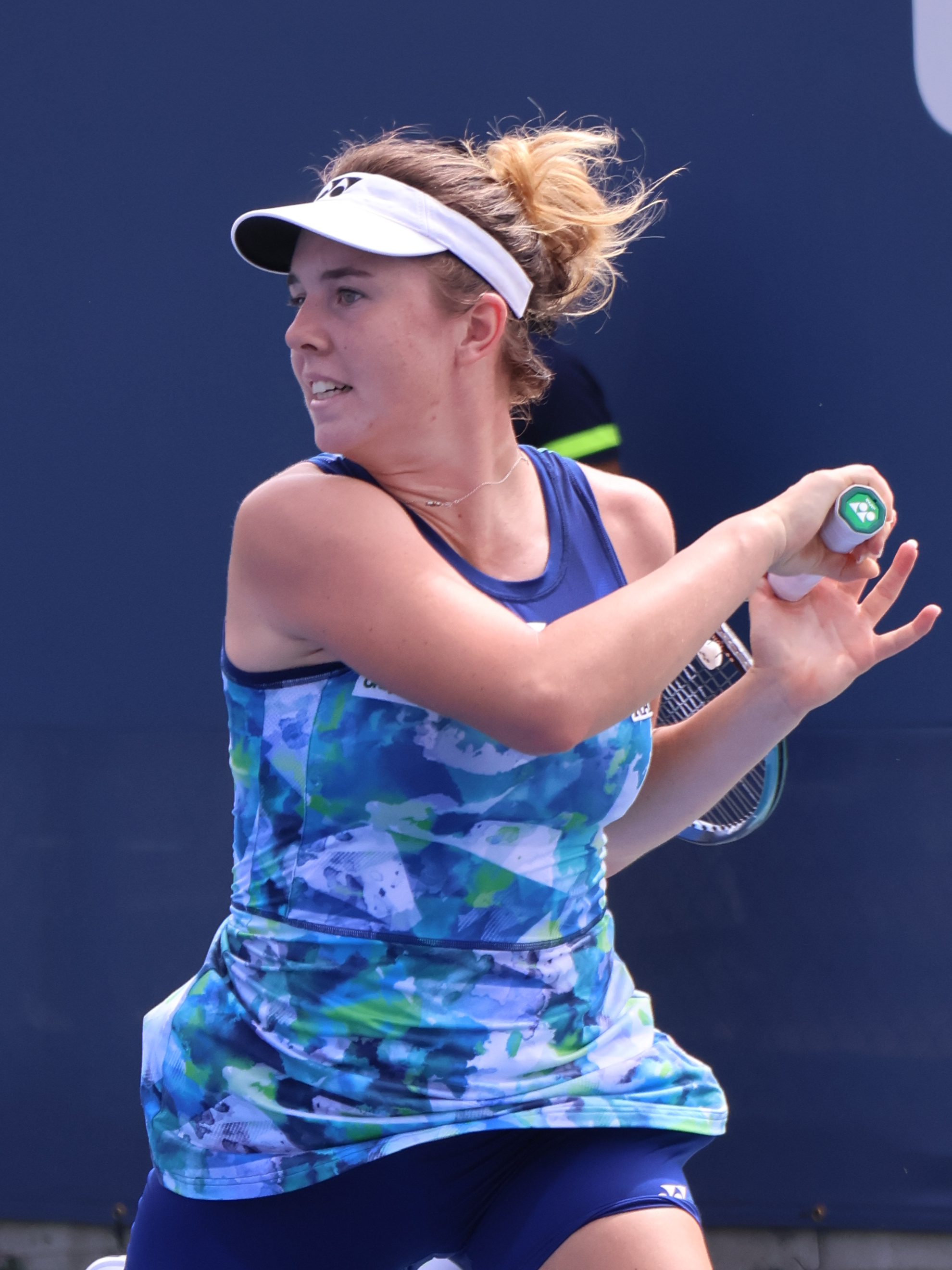
- Nosková at the 2023 US Open
- Country (sports): Czech Republic
- Residence: Přerov, Czech Republic
- Born: 17 November 2004 (age 22) Vsetín, Czech Republic
- Height: 1.79 m (5 ft 10 in)
- Turned pro: July 2019
- Plays: Right (two-handed backhand)
- Coach: Tomáš Krupa; Lukáš Dlouhý
- Prize money: US$ 12,846,903

Singles
- Career record: 219–114
- Career titles: 3
- Highest ranking: No. 6 (24 August 2026)
- Current ranking: No. 7 (16 November 2026)

Grand Slam singles results
- Australian Open: QF (2024)
- French Open: 2R (2023, 2024)
- Wimbledon: W (2026)
- US Open: QF (2026)

Other tournaments
- Tour Finals: SF (2026)
- Olympic Games: 1R (2024)

Doubles
- Career record: 72–73
- Career titles: 2
- Highest ranking: No. 36 (24 August 2026)
- Current ranking: No. 40 (16 November 2026)

Grand Slam doubles results
- Australian Open: 2R (2024)
- French Open: 2R (2023, 2024)
- Wimbledon: 3R (2026)
- US Open: 2R (2022, 2023)

Other doubles tournaments
- Olympic Games: SF (2024)

Team competitions
- BJK Cup: W (2026)
- Last updated on: 15 November 2026.

Linda Nosková (Czech pronunciation: [ˈlɪnda ˈnoskovaː]; born 17 November 2004) is a Czech professional tennis player. She has been ranked world No. 6 in women's singles and No. 36 in doubles by the Women's Tennis Association (WTA), both achieved in August 2026. Nosková has won three WTA Tour career singles titles, including a major at the 2026 Wimbledon Championships. She has won two doubles titles, including a WTA 1000 event.

As as a junior, Nosková won the girls' singles event at the 2021 French Open. In August 2022, she became the youngest player to be ranked in the world's top 100. She had her breakthrough year in 2023, reaching her first WTA Tour final and breaking into the top 50. In 2024, Nosková achieved her first major quarterfinal at the Australian Open, defeating world No. 1 Iga Świątek en route, and won her first Tour title. In 2026, she won her first major title at Wimbledon and broke into the top 10.

== Early life ==
Nosková grew up in a working-class family at the village of Bystřička in the Vsetín region. She is the daughter of Ivana Nosková, a local clothing shop owner, and Drahoš Nosek, a former railway company employee. Her first contact with tennis was at the age of seven, when she started training in Valašské Meziříčí. Three years later, she became a player for TK Na Dolina in Trojanovice near Frenštát pod Radhoštěm. In 2018, she moved to Přerov because of tennis.

== Career ==
=== Juniors ===
Nosková won the 2021 French Open girls' singles title. On 14 June 2021, she reached world No. 5 in the combined ITF junior rankings.

Grand Slam singles performance:

- Australian Open: 2R (2020)
- French Open: W (2021)

Grand Slam doubles performance:

- Australian Open: QF (2020)
- French Open: SF (2021)

=== 2019–21: Professional debut, ITF Circuit titles ===
Nosková made her ITF Circuit debut in July 2019 at a 25k Torino tournament in qualifying. Despite failing to reach the main-draw, she got to the quarterfinal in the doubles event. In October of the same year, she made her singles main-draw debut at the 15k Lousada tournament and also won her first match as a senior. The following week, in the same city, she reached her first semifinal. A month later, she reached another semifinal, this time at the 15k Milovice event in her home country.

Her new season started in August 2020 with the qualifying draw of the Prague Open, but she lost to Laura Ioana Paar. Three weeks later, she made her debut at the WTA Challenger Tour, playing at the Sparta Prague Open. Getting there after receiving a wildcard, she lost to Mayar Sherif in the first round. She finished her season with the 25k Přerov event where she lost to Barbora Krejčíková in the first round. It was only her third tournament of the year as well as her only tournament in doubles. In doubles, she also lost in the first round.

Nosková started the 2021 season in the middle of February at a W15 Sharm El Sheikh event where she reached her first ITF final. After losing to Shalimar Talbi in the final, she reached another semifinal there the following week. In March 2021, she won her first senior ITF title at a W15 event in Bratislava, defeating fellow Czech Tereza Smitková in the final. Right after that, she won another 15k event in Bratislava (back-to-back titles), this time defeating Iva Primorac in the final. In June 2021, she advanced to the semifinals of the Macha Lake Open in Staré Splavy in both events, losing to Zheng Qinwen in singles. It was her first semifinal of a W60 event, but in August, she won her first 60k title at the Zubr Cup in Přerov. In the final, she defeated Alexandra Cadanțu-Ignatik. In October, she advanced to her first ITF final in doubles. A month later, she finished the year at the W25 tournament in Milove where she won her fourth title in singles and finished runner-up in doubles.

=== 2022: Major debut, top 100 ===
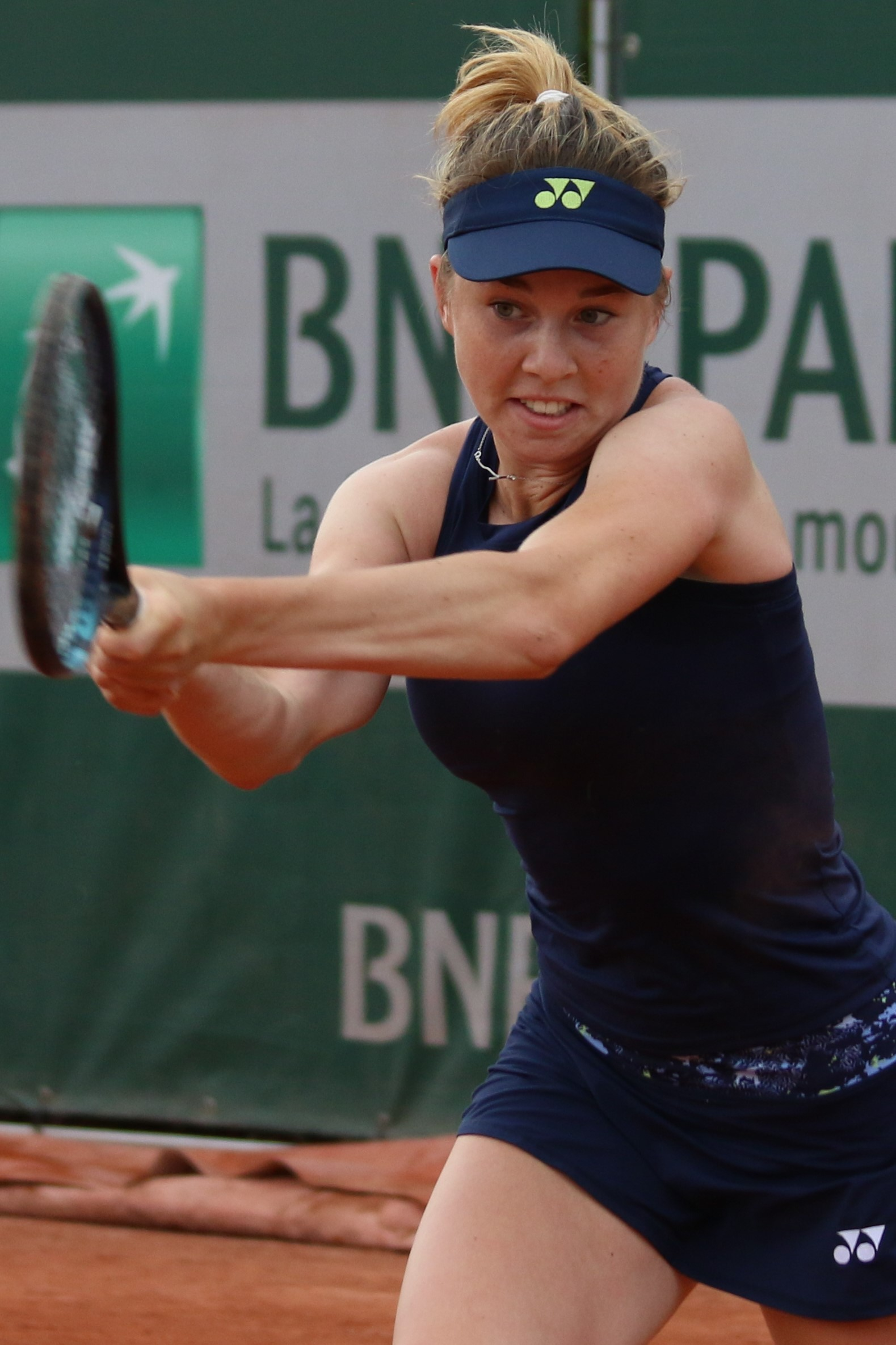
Nosková at the 2022 French Open where she made her main-draw debut.

She made her major main-draw debut at the French Open as a qualifier, making her the youngest Czech player to compete at a major since Nicole Vaidišová (17 years 127 days) at the 2006 US Open and the youngest player to qualify for the tournament since 16-year-old Michelle Larcher de Brito in 2009. In the first round of the main draw, she faced US Open champion Emma Raducanu and lost, after winning the first set. The following week, she reached the semifinals of the WTA 125 Makarska International Championships.

In July, she won her first 100k title, at the Reinert Open defeating Ysaline Bonaventure in the final. Three weeks later, she entered her first WTA Tour semifinal at the Prague Open but lost to compatriot and later champion, Marie Bouzková. However, she marked her first top 50 win defeating Alizé Cornet, in the second round. This result led her into the top 100 for the first time, at world No. 94 becoming the youngest woman in the top 100, a distinction Coco Gauff had held since October 2019. By reaching the semifinals, she became the youngest Czech woman to reach a tour-level semifinal since Vaidišová (17 years, 189 days) in Linz in 2006.

At the US Open, she competed in her second qualifying for a major and advanced to the main draw with three qualifying wins. In the second round, she defeated former top-10 player Eugenie Bouchard. However, she was beaten in the first round of the main draw by Bouzková in a three-set match.

=== 2023: WTA 500 final, top 50 ===
Ranked No. 102 at the start of the Adelaide International 1, she came through qualifying beating Anna Kalinskaya and Anastasia Potapova to make the main draw. In the first round, she beat world No. 8, Daria Kasatkina, to get her first top 10 win, and in the second, she beat fellow qualifier Claire Liu to make her first WTA 500 quarterfinal. She defeated two-time major champion and former world No. 1, Victoria Azarenka, in a three-set thriller in the quarterfinals, winning the final set tiebreak 8–6, after saving one match point. She then beat top seed and world No. 2, Ons Jabeur, to reach her first ever WTA Tour final which she lost to second seed Aryna Sabalenka, in straight sets. As a result, she moved close to 50 positions up in the rankings to No. 56. Despite being ranked well inside the top 100 by the start of the Australian Open, Nosková needed to play qualifying due to the sudden nature of her rise up the rankings. However, she lost in the first round of qualifying to world No. 192, Katherine Sebov. Nevertheless, she reached No. 50 in the rankings on 6 February 2023 becoming the youngest player in the top 50.

At the Indian Wells Open, she reached the third round of a WTA 1000 for the first time in her debut at this level, defeating Irina-Camelia Begu and 31st seed Amanda Anisimova. Her run was ended by sixth seed Coco Gauff.

At the Cincinnati Open, she also reached the third round defeating ninth seed Petra Kvitová en route, before losing to seventh seed Coco Gauff.

=== 2024: Australian Open quarterfinal, WTA 500 title, top 30 ===
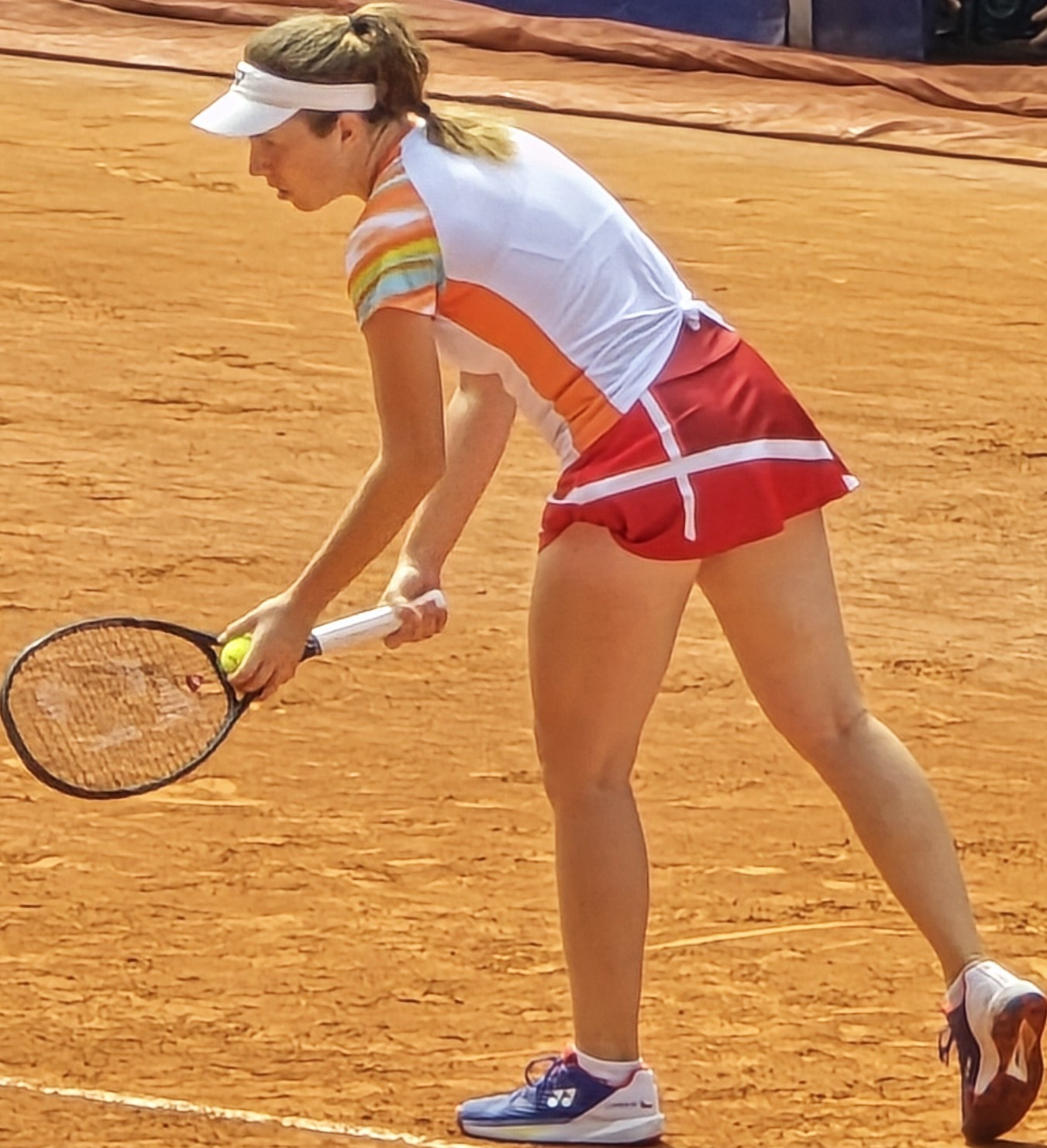
Nosková serving at the 2024 Paris Olympics.

On her debut at the Australian Open, Nosková recorded her first wins there over 31st seed and compatriot, Marie Bouzková and wildcard entrant McCartney Kessler to reach the third round. She then stunned world No. 1, Iga Świątek, to move to the fourth round of a major event for the first time in her career. She became the first teenager to defeat a world No. 1 at this major since 1999, when Amélie Mauresmo shocked Lindsay Davenport. She advanced to the quarterfinals for the first time, after the retirement of 19th seed Elina Svitolina in the fourth round. Despite losing in the last eight to qualifier Dayana Yastremska, Nosková reached the top 30 in the singles rankings on 29 January 2024.

In July, as top seed at the Prague Open, she overcame qualifier Katarina Zavatska, Eva Lys and Ella Seidel to make it into the semifinals, at which point she lost to fourth seed and eventual champion Magda Linette in a deciding set tiebreak.

At the WTA 500 Monterrey Open, she defeated qualifier Anna Danilina, Wang Xiyu and fifth seed and former champion, Elina Svitolina, to reach her third semifinal for the season, following Brisbane and Prague. Nosková defeated second seed Emma Navarro in straight sets to reach her first final of the season. She won her maiden WTA Tour title with another straight sets victory over Lulu Sun.

=== 2025: WTA 1000 final, top 20 ===
In February, Nosková reached the semifinals at the Abu Dhabi Open with wins over Magdalena Fręch, second seed Paula Badosa and Magda Linette, before losing in the last four to Ashlyn Krueger.

Two weeks later, at the Dubai Championships, she defeated Yulia Putintseva, 11th seed Diana Shnaider and fifth seed Jessica Pegula to make it through to the quarterfinals, where she lost to Clara Tauson.

Partnering Irina Khromacheva, Nosková reached the doubles final at the Open de Rouen in April, losing to Aleksandra Krunić and Sabrina Santamaria in straight sets.

At the Nottingham Open, she defeated lucky loser Anca Todoni and wildcard entrant Francesca Jones to reach the quarterfinals, where she lost to Rebecca Šramková. The following week at the Bad Homburg Open, wins over qualifier Ajla Tomljanović, Donna Vekić and third seed Mirra Andreeva saw Nosková make it into the semifinals, at which point she lost to top seed and eventual champion Jessica Pegula. Seeded 30th at Wimbledon, she overcame Bernarda Pera, Eva Lys and Kamilla Rakhimova to reach the fourth round at the grass-court major for the first time. Her run was ended by 13th seed and eventual finalist Amanda Anisimova.

As the top seed at the Prague Open, Nosková defeated qualifier Anastasia Gasanova, Elisabetta Cocciaretto, Kateřina Siniaková and fourth seed Wang Xinyu to make it to the final, which she lost to Marie Bouzková, in three sets.

Defending her title at the Monterrey Open, Nosková recorded wins over qualifier Lulu Sun and Tatjana Maria to reach the quarterfinals, where she lost to second seed Ekaterina Alexandrova. Seeded 21st at the US Open, Nosková defeated qualifier Dalma Gálfi and Eva Lys, before losing to 11th seed Karolína Muchová, in three sets.

At the China Open, she received a bye as the 26th seed and then defeated Wang Xiyu to reach the third round, where she advanced when her opponent, seventh seed Zheng Qinwen, retired due to injury with Nosková leading in the deciding set. Nosková then overcame Anastasia Potapova Sonay Kartal and fifth seed Jessica Pegula to make it into her first WTA 1000 final, which she lost to third seed Amanda Anisimova, in three sets. Despite her loss, she reached a new career-high ranking of world No. 17, on 6 October 2025. Two weeks later, at the Pan Pacific Open, Nosková received a bye due to her seeding, defeated McCartney Kessler and then advanced to the semifinals when Anna Kalinskaya retired because of a back injury after losing the opening seven games of their quarterfinal match. She then received a walkover into the final when her last four opponent, second seed Elena Rybakina, withdrew from the tournament due to a back injury. Nosková lost the championship match to fifth seed Belinda Bencic in straight sets. As a result, she reached a new career-high ranking of world No. 13, on 27 October 2025.

=== 2026: Wimbledon champion, top 10 ===
Seeded 14th at the WTA 1000 tournament in Indian Wells, Nosková reached the semifinals, where she lost to world No. 1 and eventual champion, Aryna Sabalenka. With a run that included a win over eighth seed Ekaterina Alexandrova in the second round, she made it through to the quarterfinals at the Stuttgart Grand Prix, at which point she was eliminated by fourth seed Elina Svitolina. At the Madrid Open, Nosková defeated world No. 3, Coco Gauff, in the fourth round, only to lose to 26th seed Marta Kostyuk in the quarterfinals. At the French Open, she lost in the first round to Maria Sakkari.

In June at the Berlin Tennis Open as eighth seed, she recorded wins over qualifiers Renata Zarazúa, Diane Parry, then wildcard entrants Paula Badosa and Alexandra Eala to reach her first grass-court WTA Tour singles final. In the championship match she defeated third seed Jessica Pegula in three sets to claim her second tour-level singles title and, as a result, made her debut in the top 10, on 22 June 2026. The day after winning the singles, Nosková teamed with Ekaterina Alexandrova to claim the doubles title, overcoming third seeds Sara Errani and Nicole Melichar-Martinez in the final which was delayed due to heavy rain.

At Wimbledon, Nosková enjoyed the best run at a major of her career. She defeated Elise Mertens in the quarterfinals to reach her first major semifinal, before overcoming 12th seed Marta Kostyuk to advance to her first major final. Her victory set up the first all-Czech women's singles final in Wimbledon history against compatriot Karolína Muchová. Nosková lifted her maiden major title, after failing to convert five championship points, but eventually securing a three-set win on her sixth opportunity, becoming the youngest Wimbledon women's singles champion since Petra Kvitová in 2011. The triumph propelled her to a career-high ranking of world No. 7 on 13 July 2026. She became the third Czech woman to win the Wimbledon singles title, in four years, following Markéta Vondroušová (2023) and Barbora Krejčíková (2024).

In August at the WTA 1000 Cincinnati Open, Nosková teamed with fellow Czech player Marie Bouzková to win the doubles title, defeating Magali Kempen and Alexandra Panova in the final. A run to the fourth round in the singles at the same tournament saw her reach a new career-high ranking of world No. 6 on 24 August 2026. At the US Open, Nosková made it through to the quarterfinals for the first time at this major, where she lost to world No. 1 Aryna Sabalenka in a deciding 10 point tiebreak.

== Personal life ==
In July 2024, just a day before she was about to play at the Wimbledon Championships, Nosková's mother, Ivana Nosková, passed away due to cancer.

In November 2025, Nosková visited Zanzibar and spent a week volunteering at a school.

== Career statistics ==
=== Grand Slam tournament performance timelines ===
Key
| W | F | SF | QF | #R | RR | Q# | DNQ | A | NH |

(W) winner; (F) finalist; (SF) semifinalist; (QF) quarterfinalist; (#R) rounds 4, 3, 2, 1; (RR) round-robin stage; (Q#) qualification round; (DNQ) did not qualify; (A) absent; (NH) not held; (SR) strike rate (events won / competed); (W–L) win–loss record.
To avoid confusion and double counting, these charts are updated at the conclusion of a tournament or when the player's participation has ended.

==== Singles ====
Current through the 2026 US Open.

| Tournament | 2022 | 2023 | 2024 | 2025 | 2026 | SR | W–L | Win % |
|---|---|---|---|---|---|---|---|---|
| Australian Open | A | Q1 | QF | 1R | 3R | 0 / 3 | 6–3 | 67% |
| French Open | 1R | 2R | 2R | 1R | 1R | 0 / 5 | 2–5 | 29% |
| Wimbledon | A | 1R | 2R | 4R | W | 1 / 4 | 11–3 | 79% |
| US Open | 1R | 2R | 1R | 3R | QF | 0 / 5 | 7–5 | 58% |
| Win–Loss | 0–2 | 2–3 | 6–4 | 5–4 | 13–3 | 1 / 17 | 26–16 | 62% |

==== Doubles ====
Current through the 2026 US Open.

| Tournament | 2022 | 2023 | 2024 | 2025 | 2026 | SR | W–L | Win% |
|---|---|---|---|---|---|---|---|---|
| Australian Open | A | A | 2R | 1R | 1R | 0 / 3 | 1–3 | 25% |
| French Open | A | 2R | 2R | 1R | 1R | 0 / 4 | 2–4 | 33% |
| Wimbledon | A | 1R | 1R | 1R | 3R | 0 / 4 | 2–4 | 33% |
| US Open | 2R | 2R | 1R | 1R | 1R | 0 / 5 | 2–5 | 29% |
| Win–Loss | 1–1 | 2–3 | 2–4 | 0–4 | 2–4 | 0 / 16 | 7–16 | 30% |

=== Grand Slam tournament finals ===
==== Singles: 1 (title) ====
| Result | Year | Tournament | Surface | Opponent | Score |
|---|---|---|---|---|---|
| Win | 2026 | Wimbledon | Grass | (Czech Republic) Karolína Muchová | 6–2, 5–7, 6–3 |

=== Olympic Games medal matches ===
==== Doubles: 1 (4th place) ====
| Result | Year | Tournament | Surface | Partner | Opponents | Score |
|---|---|---|---|---|---|---|
| 4th place | 2024 | Paris Summer Olympics | Clay | (Czech Republic) Karolína Muchová | (Spain) Cristina Bucșa (Spain) Sara Sorribes Tormo | 2–6, 2–6 |
