= Wimbledon ban on Russian and Belarusian players =

Policy at the 2022 Wimbledon Championships

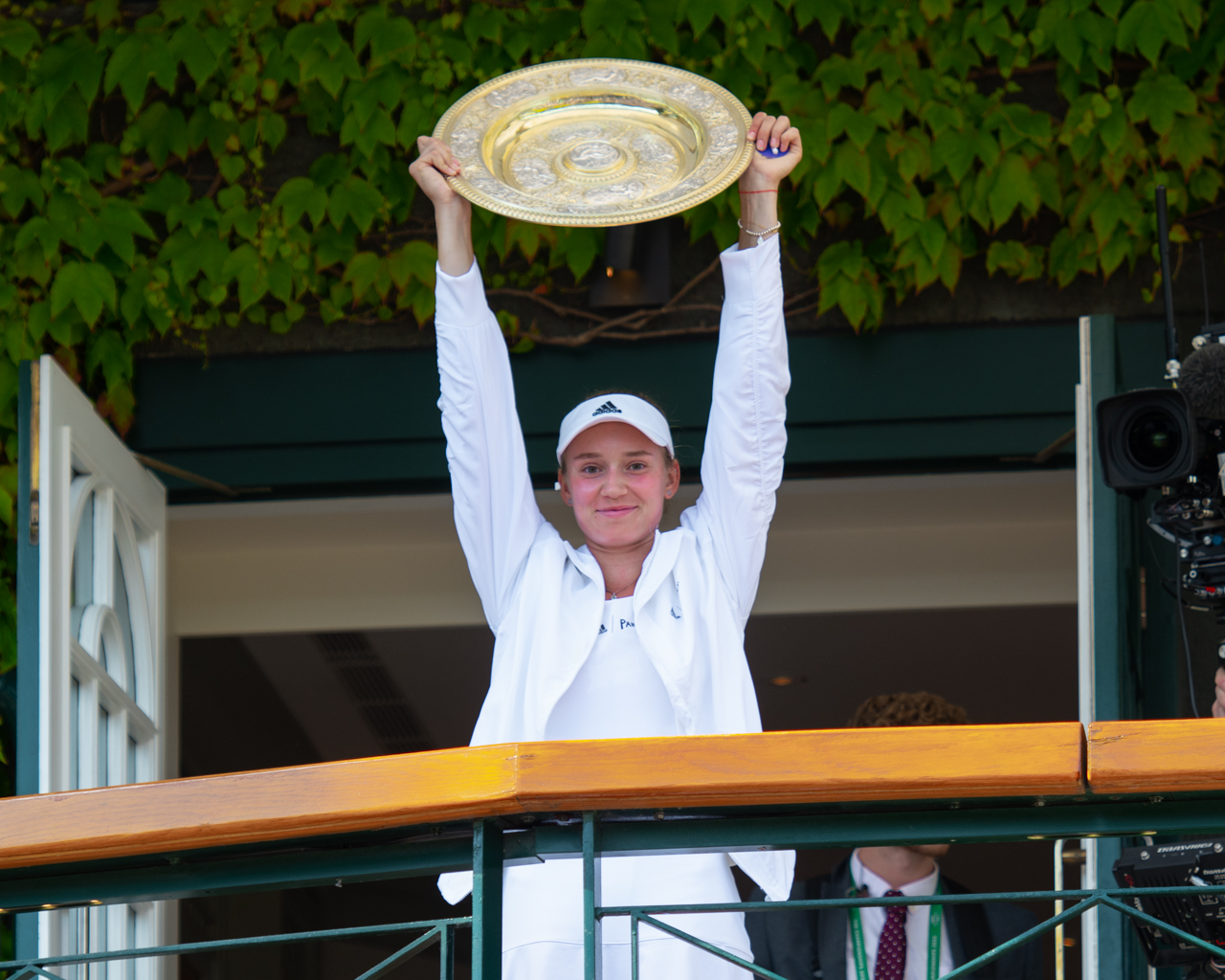
2022 Wimbledon champion Elena Rybakina, who represented Russia until 2018

In 2022, tennis players representing Russia and Belarus were banned from competing at the year's Wimbledon Championships and other UK tennis tournaments. In response to Russia's invasion of Ukraine, the UK government pressured the All England Lawn Tennis and Croquet Club (AELTC), which organizes Wimbledon (one of the four Grand Slam tournaments), to impose the ban. International tennis bodies and many players opposed the ban, including the Association of Tennis Professionals (ATP) and the Women's Tennis Association (WTA), which decided not to award ranking points for Wimbledon results that year. On 31 March 2023, the AELTC rescinded the ban.

== Background and the ban ==
Russia, with support from its ally Belarus, invaded Ukraine on 24 February 2022. It quickly faced widespread international condemnation, including sanctions in the world of sport. On 1 March, the ATP and the WTA condemned the invasion and cancelled a joint tournament planned to be held in Moscow. The same day, the International Tennis Federation (ITF) cancelled all of its events planned to be held in Russia and suspended Russian and Belarusian players from participating in international competitions such as the Billie Jean King Cup, the Davis Cup, and the Olympic Games. However, Russians and Belarusians continued to be allowed to compete on tour and at Grand Slams as individual athletes without a national flag.

On 15 March, UK Sports Minister Nigel Huddleston stated in a parliamentary committee that "nobody flying the flag for Russia should be allowed" to play at Wimbledon (to be held 27 June to 10 July) and that any Russians seeking to participate should be required to declare their non-support for Putin. WTA CEO Steve Simon said there was no precedent to threaten to ban tennis players "as the result of political positions their leadership may take". Over the next month, the AELTC and the Lawn Tennis Association (LTA) consulted with the Boris Johnson government over Russian participation in UK tennis events.

On 20 April, citing "guidance set out by the UK Government", the AELTC announced that Russian and Belarusian players would not be permitted to play at the upcoming Wimbledon Championships. AELTC chair Ian Hewitt said the decision was due to "the high profile environment of The Championships, the importance of not allowing sport to be used to promote the Russian regime and our broader concerns for public and player (including family) safety". The same day, the LTA announced that Russian and Belarusian players would be banned from all of its events, including the Eastbourne International and the Queen's Club Championships.

== Reactions, stripping of ranking points ==
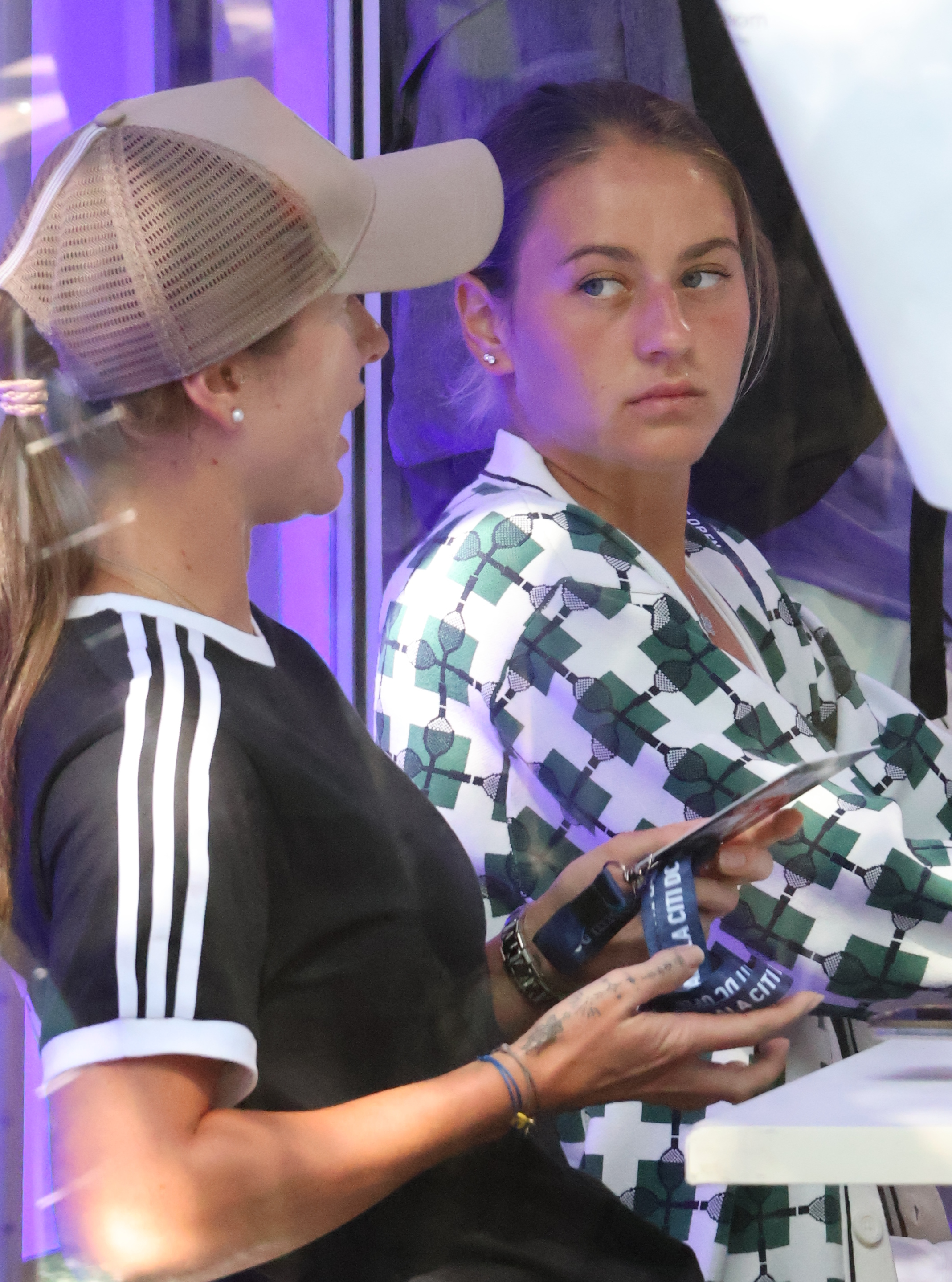
Elina Svitolina and Marta Kostyuk of Ukraine supported the ban.

Opinion polling showed that the ban was "broadly popular" in the UK. The ban was supported by Polish player Iga Świątek, Czech player Petra Kvitová, and many Ukrainian players such as Alexandr Dolgopolov, Marta Kostyuk, Sergiy Stakhovsky, and Elina Svitolina. It was also supported by Nordic countries including Sweden, Iceland, Finland, and Norway.

Many others in the tennis world criticized the AELTC for breaking with the consensus formed by the ITF, the ATP, the WTA, and the other three Grand Slam tournaments to allow Russians and Belarusians to compete as neutral athletes. The ATP and the WTA issued statements on 20 April 2022 opposing the ban as discriminatory, while continuing to condemn the invasion. Many current and former players spoke out against the ban, such as Novak Djokovic, Billie Jean King, John Millman, Andy Murray, Rafael Nadal, Martina Navratilova, and Alexander Zverev. Andrey Rublev, who was subject to the ban, called it "complete discrimination" and said he had hoped to find a workaround by offering to donate his prize money.

On 20 May 2022, in an "unprecedented" move, the ITF, the ATP, and the WTA announced that they would not award ITF Junior, ITF Wheelchair, ATP, nor WTA ranking points for results at Wimbledon because of the ban. However, ATP and WTA points were not excluded from Eastbourne and Queen's because, unlike during Wimbledon, there would remain opportunities for Russian and Belarusian players to compete the same week in non-UK events. The AELTC said it was disappointed by the decision to strip Wimbledon of ranking points, and some players considered the decision unfair, such as Andy Murray and Casper Ruud.

On 4 July 2022, the WTA applied fines of $750,000 to the AELTC and $250,000 to the LTA over the ban. Both appealed the fines. On 7 December 2022, the ATP fined the LTA $1 million over the ban.

== Aftermath ==
The ban applied to sixteen ATP or WTA singles players ranked within the top 100. Among the most prominent unable to compete were Russians Daria Kasatkina, Veronika Kudermetova, Daniil Medvedev, Anastasia Pavlyuchenkova, and Rublev, and Belarusians Victoria Azarenka and Aryna Sabalenka.

Despite the ban, the women's singles title was won by a player born in Russia: Elena Rybakina (who switched her nationality to Kazakhstan in 2018 due to a lack of Russian Tennis Federation support). Russian state media celebrated Rybakina's win as a national victory despite her longstanding decision not to represent the country of her birth. Additionally, the top 100 doubles player Natela Dzalamidze switched her nationality in June 2022 from Russia to Georgia to be able to play at Wimbledon and the Olympics; she reached the second round of Wimbledon women's doubles.

The absence of ranking points from Wimbledon was felt throughout the year. In the WTA rankings, Rybakina would have cracked the top 10 with her win, but instead stayed just outside the top 20 and eventually cracked the top 10 six months later; she said it was "not the greatest" that, despite being a major champion, she was not receiving a top 10 player's treatment with regard to court placement and match scheduling; and she lagged in the race for the WTA Finals, finishing as the year-end No. 22 instead of possibly No. 7 or higher. In the ATP rankings, men's singles champion Djokovic fell from No. 3 to No. 7 despite defending his title, and he faced a large gap in chasing eventual year-end No. 1 Carlos Alcaraz; with credit for Wimbledon, Djokovic would have ended up as the year-end No. 2, just 200 points from the top, instead of year-end No. 5. (Note: Though he eventually qualified outright, Djokovic (unlike Rybakina) automatically qualified for the year-end finals by winning Wimbledon because of an ATP rule (not in the WTA) that rewards players who have won a major tournament and rank within the top 20 but fall outside the top-8 cutoff.)

Other players in the list are Nick Kyrgios, the men's singles finalist, who would have re-entered the ATP top 20 after the tournament, but instead ranked No. 40; Tatjana Maria, the women's singles semifinalist, who would have entered the WTA top 40 for the first time in her career after the tournament, but remained steady at the top 100, Maria eventually cracked in the top 40 three years later; and Jule Niemeier, the women's singles quarterfinalist, who would have also entered the WTA top 60 for the first time, but fell down slightly outside of the top 100.

In December 2022, the AELTC was reported to be reconsidering the ban ahead of the 2023 Championships. On 31 March 2023, the AELTC rescinded the ban, announcing that Russians and Belarusians would be allowed to play if they refrain from expressing support for the invasion and sign statements attesting to their neutrality. The AELTC said on 25 April that players had begun signing the personal statements.
