= Tennis world rankings =

Tennis world rankings may refer to:

- ATP rankings, for elite men's singles (since 1973) and doubles (since 1976)
- WTA rankings, for elite women's singles (since 1975) and doubles (since 1984)
- Top ten ranked male tennis players (1912–1972), various earlier unofficial systems
- Top ten ranked female tennis players (1921–1974), various earlier unofficial systems

== See also ==
- Current tennis rankings, ATP and WTA
- Universal Tennis Rating, an absolute number rather than a relative ranking, extended to lower-level male and female players
- Category:World championships in tennis
