= 2026 ATP Finals – Singles =

Singles
- 2026 ATP Finals

Final
- Champion: (Spain) Carlos Alcaraz
- Runner-up: (Germany) Alexander Zverev
- Score: 6–2, 7–6^{(9–7)}

Details
- Draw: 8 (round robin + elimination)
- Seeds: 8

Events
Singles	Doubles
- ATP Finals

Carlos Alcaraz defeated Alexander Zverev in the final, 6–2, 7–6^{(9–7)} to win the singles tennis title at the 2026 ATP Finals. It was his first ATP Finals title and 30th ATP Tour title overall. Alcaraz was the first Spaniard to win the title since Àlex Corretja in 1998. Upon winning the title undefeated, Alcaraz earned the highest prize money in tournament history, at US$5.171 million.

Jannik Sinner was the two-time reigning champion and qualified this year, but withdrew from the tournament due to an ongoing knee injury.

Flavio Cobolli, Arthur Fils, Frances Tiafoe and Rafael Jódar made their debuts in the singles competition.

With Alcaraz and Jódar qualifying, this marked the first time that two Spaniards qualified for the ATP Finals since Rafael Nadal and David Ferrer in 2015. Jódar became the first player to qualify for the ATP Finals in his debut season on the top-level ATP Tour, having made his first tour-level main draw appearance at the 2026 Australian Open.

== Seeds ==
1. (Germany) Alexander Zverev (final)
2. (Spain) Carlos Alcaraz (champion)
3. (United States) Ben Shelton (semifinals)
4. Daniil Medvedev (semifinals)
5. (Italy) Flavio Cobolli (round robin)
6. (France) Arthur Fils (round robin)
7. (United States) Frances Tiafoe (round robin)
8. (Spain) Rafael Jódar (round robin)

== Alternates ==
1. (Australia) Alex de Minaur (did not play)
2. (Canada) Félix Auger-Aliassime (did not play)

== Draw ==
Key

- Q = Qualifier
- WC = Wild card
- LL = Lucky loser
- Alt = Alternate
- ITF = ITF entry
- PR = Protected ranking
- SR = Special ranking
- SE = Special exempt
- JE = Junior exempt
- JR = Junior Accelerator Programme entrant
- CO = College Accelerator Programme entrant
- NG = Next Gen Accelerator Program entrant
- w/o = Walkover
- r = Retired
- d = Defaulted

=== Finals ===
Semifinals
1	(Germany) Alexander Zverev	7^{7}	6
4	Daniil Medvedev	6^{0}	4
2	(Spain) Carlos Alcaraz	3	6	7^{7}
3	(United States) Ben Shelton	6	3	6^{1}

Final
1	(Germany) Alexander Zverev	2	6^{7}
2	(Spain) Carlos Alcaraz	6	7^{9}

=== John McEnroe Group ===
		(Germany) Zverev	(United States) Shelton	(France) Fils	(Spain) Jódar	RR; W–L	Set; W–L	Game; W–L	Standings
1	(Germany) Alexander Zverev		6–2, 7–6^{(7–4)}	6–4, 7–6^{(8–6)}	6–4, 6–4	3–0	6–0 (100%)	38–26 (59%)	1
3	(United States) Ben Shelton	2–6, 6–7^{(4–7)}		6–2, 3–6, 6–3	7–6^{(10–8)}, 7–5	2–1	4–3 (57%)	37–35 (51%)	2
6	(France) Arthur Fils	4–6, 6–7^{(6–8)}	2–6, 6–3, 3–6		4–6, 6–2, 6–2	1–2	3–5 (38%)	37–38 (49%)	3
8	(Spain) Rafael Jódar	4–6, 4–6	6–7^{(8–10)}, 5–7	6–4, 2–6, 2–6		0–3	1–6 (14%)	29–42 (41%)	4

=== Ivan Lendl Group ===
		(Spain) Alcaraz	Medvedev	(Italy) Cobolli	(United States) Tiafoe	RR; W–L	Set; W–L	Game; W–L	Standings
2	(Spain) Carlos Alcaraz		6–2, 6–4	6–4, 6–1	6–2, 6–2	3–0	6–0 (100%)	36–15 (71%)	1
4	Daniil Medvedev	2–6, 4–6		7–6^{(7–4)}, 6–3	6–3, 6–4	2–1	4–2 (67%)	31–28 (53%)	2
5	(Italy) Flavio Cobolli	4–6, 1–6	6–7^{(4–7)}, 3–6		6–7^{(6–8)}, 0–6	0–3	0–6 (0%)	20–38 (34%)	4
7	(United States) Frances Tiafoe	2–6, 2–6	3–6, 4–6	7–6^{(8–6)}, 6–0		1–2	2–4 (33%)	24–30 (44%)	3

Standings are determined by: 1. number of wins; 2. number of matches; 3. in two-player ties, head-to-head records; 4. in three-player ties, (a) percentage of sets won (head-to-head records if two players remain tied), then (b) percentage of games won (head-to-head records if two players remain tied), then (c) ATP rankings.
