= 2026 ATP Finals – Doubles =

Doubles
- 2026 ATP Finals

Final
- Champions: (France) Théo Arribagé (France) Albano Olivetti
- Runners-up: (El Salvador) Marcelo Arévalo (Croatia) Mate Pavić
- Score: 3–6, 7–6^{(7–2)}, [10–6]

Details
- Draw: 8 (round robin + elimination)
- Seeds: 8

Events
Singles	Doubles
- ATP Finals

Théo Arribagé and Albano Olivetti defeated Marcelo Arévalo and Mate Pavić in the final, 3–6, 7–6^{(7–2)}, [10–6] to win the doubles tennis title at the 2026 ATP Finals. They saved three match points (against Kevin Krawietz and Tim Pütz in the semifinals) en route to the title. They were the second all-French pair to win the title, after Pierre-Hugues Herbert and Nicolas Mahut.

Harri Heliövaara and Henry Patten were the defending champions, but were eliminated in the round-robin stage.

Arribagé, Olivetti, Orlando Luz and Rafael Matos made their debuts in the doubles competition.

== Seeds ==
1. (Finland) Harri Heliövaara / (United Kingdom) Henry Patten (round robin)
2. (United States) Christian Harrison / (United Kingdom) Neal Skupski (semifinals)
3. (Spain) Marcel Granollers / (Argentina) Horacio Zeballos (round robin)
4. (El Salvador) Marcelo Arévalo / (Croatia) Mate Pavić (final)
5. (Italy) Simone Bolelli / (Italy) Andrea Vavassori (round robin)
6. (France) Théo Arribagé / (France) Albano Olivetti (champions)
7. (Germany) Kevin Krawietz / (Germany) Tim Pütz (semifinals)
8. (Brazil) Orlando Luz / (Brazil) Rafael Matos (round robin)

== Alternates ==
1. (Argentina) Guido Andreozzi / (France) Manuel Guinard (did not play)
2. (United Kingdom) Julian Cash / (United Kingdom) Lloyd Glasspool (did not play)

== Draw ==
Key

- Q = Qualifier
- WC = Wild card
- LL = Lucky loser
- Alt = Alternate
- ITF = ITF entry
- PR = Protected ranking
- SR = Special ranking
- SE = Special exempt
- JE = Junior exempt
- JR = Junior Accelerator Programme entrant
- CO = College Accelerator Programme entrant
- NG = Next Gen Accelerator Program entrant
- w/o = Walkover
- r = Retired
- d = Defaulted

=== Finals ===
Semifinals
4	(El Salvador) Marcelo Arévalo (Croatia) Mate Pavić	7^{12}	6^{7}	[10]
2	(United States) Christian Harrison (United Kingdom) Neal Skupski	6^{10}	7^{9}	[7]
7	(Germany) Kevin Krawietz (Germany) Tim Pütz	6^{4}	7^{8}	[10]
6	(France) Théo Arribagé (France) Albano Olivetti	7^{7}	6^{6}	[12]

Final
4	(El Salvador) Marcelo Arévalo (Croatia) Mate Pavić	6	6^{2}	[6]
6	(France) Théo Arribagé (France) Albano Olivetti	3	7^{7}	[10]

=== Todd Woodbridge Group ===
		(Finland) Heliövaara (United Kingdom) Patten	(El Salvador) Arévalo (Croatia) Pavić	(France) Arribagé (France) Olivetti	(Brazil) Luz (Brazil) Matos	RR; W–L	Set; W–L	Game; W–L	Standings
1	(Finland) Harri Heliövaara (United Kingdom) Henry Patten		7–6^{(7–5)}, 3–6, [4–10]	6–7^{(5–7)}, 6–7^{(3–7)}	6–3, 5–7, [10–4]	1–2	3–5 (38%)	34–37 (48%)	3
4	(El Salvador) Marcelo Arévalo (Croatia) Mate Pavić	6–7^{(5–7)}, 6–3, [10–4]		7–6^{(9–7)}, 6–4	6–3, 6–4	3–0	6–1 (86%)	38–27 (58%)	1
6	(France) Théo Arribagé (France) Albano Olivetti	7–6^{(7–5)}, 7–6^{(7–3)}	6–7^{(7–9)}, 4–6		6–4, 7–6^{(7–4)}	2–1	4–2 (67%)	37–35 (51%)	2
8	(Brazil) Orlando Luz (Brazil) Rafael Matos	3–6, 7–5, [4–10]	3–6, 4–6	4–6, 6–7^{(4–7)}		0–3	1–6 (14%)	27–37 (42%)	4

=== Mark Woodforde Group ===
		(United States) Harrison (United Kingdom) Skupski	(Spain) Granollers (Argentina) Zeballos	(Italy) Bolelli (Italy) Vavassori	(Germany) Krawietz (Germany) Pütz	RR; W–L	Set; W–L	Game; W–L	Standings
2	(United States) Christian Harrison (United Kingdom) Neal Skupski		7–6^{(7–5)}, 6–4	6–3, 6–4	1–6, 3–6	2–1	4–2 (67%)	29–29 (50%)	2
3	(Spain) Marcel Granollers (Argentina) Horacio Zeballos	6–7^{(5–7)}, 4–6		6–4, 6–4	7–6^{(7–4)}, 1–6, [5–10]	1–2	3–4 (43%)	30–34 (47%)	3
5	(Italy) Simone Bolelli (Italy) Andrea Vavassori	3–6, 4–6	4–6, 4–6		7–6^{(7–4)}, 6–7^{(3–7)}, [7–10]	0–3	1–6 (14%)	28–38 (42%)	4
7	(Germany) Kevin Krawietz (Germany) Tim Pütz	6–1, 6–3	6–7^{(4–7)}, 6–1, [10–5]	6–7^{(4–7)}, 7–6^{(7–3)}, [10–7]		3–0	6–2 (75%)	39–25 (61%)	1

Standings are determined by: 1. number of wins; 2. number of matches; 3. in two-team ties, head-to-head records; 4. in three-team ties, (a) percentage of sets won (head-to-head records if two teams remain tied), then (b) percentage of games won (head-to-head records if two teams remain tied), then (c) ATP rankings.
