= 2026 ATP Finals =

- Date: 15–22 November
- Edition: 57th (singles) / 52nd (doubles)
- Category: ATP Finals
- Draw: 8S/8D
- Surface: Hard (indoor)
- Location: Turin, Italy
- Venue: Inalpi Arena

Champions

Singles
- (Spain) Carlos Alcaraz

Doubles
- (France) Théo Arribagé / (France) Albano Olivetti
- ATP Finals

The 2026 ATP Finals (also known as the 2026 Nitto ATP Finals due to Nitto sponsorship) was a men's tennis tournament held from 15 to 22 November 2026. It was played on indoor hardcourts at the Inalpi Arena in Turin, Italy for the sixth consecutive time, and was the season-ending event for the highest-ranked singles players and doubles teams on the 2026 ATP Tour. The tournament was the 57th edition of the singles event and the 52nd edition of the doubles competition.

== Champions ==
=== Singles ===
- (Spain) Carlos Alcaraz def. (Germany) Alexander Zverev, 6–2, 7–6^{(9–7)}

=== Doubles ===
- (France) Théo Arribagé / (France) Albano Olivetti def. (El Salvador) Marcelo Arévalo / (Croatia) Mate Pavić, 3–6, 7–6^{(7–2)}, [10–5]

== Format ==
The ATP Finals group stage has a round-robin format, with eight players/teams divided into two groups of four and each player/team in a group playing the other three in the group. The eight seeds are determined by the PIF ATP rankings and ATP Doubles Team Rankings on the Monday after the last ATP Tour tournament of the calendar year. All singles matches, including the final, are best of three sets with tie-breaks in each set including the third. All doubles matches are two sets (no ad) and a Match Tie-break.

In deciding placement within a group, the following criteria are used, in order:

1. Most wins.
2. Most matches played (e.g., a 2–1 record beats a 2–0 record).
3. Head-to-head result between tied players/teams.
4. Highest percentage of sets won.
5. Highest percentage of games won.
6. ATP rank after the last ATP Tour tournament of the year.

Criteria 4–6 are used only in the event of a three-way tie; if one of these criteria decided a winner or loser among the three, the remaining two will have been ranked by head-to-head result.

The top two of each group will advance to semifinals, with the winner of each group playing the runner-up of the other group. The winners of the semifinals then will play for the title.

== Prize money, ranking points and trophies ==
The 2026 ATP Finals has a total prize money pool of US$15,750,000, an increase of 1.61% compared to 2025. An undefeated singles champion can earn a maximum of $5,171,000, while an undefeated doubles team can earn $959,300. The tournament awards the following ranking points and prize money, per victory (doubles prize money is per team):

Stage	Singles	Doubles	Points
Final win	$2,412,000	$356,800	500
Semi-final win	$1,206,000	$178,500	400
Round-robin match win	$405,000	$96,600	200
Participation fee	3 matches = $338,000; 2 matches = $253,000; 1 match = $169,000	3 matches = $134,200; 2 matches = $100,650; 1 match = $67,100	—N/a
Alternates	$156,000	$51,700	—N/a
Undefeated champion	$5,171,000	$959,300	1500

- An undefeated champion would earn the maximum 1,500 ranking points, and $5,171,000 in singles¹ or $959,300 in doubles².

¹ - Singles breakdown $338,000: Participation fee 3 matches $1,215,000: 3 RR wins @ $405,000/each $1,206,000: Semifinal win $2,412,000: Final win $5,171,000: Total prize money for undefeated champion

² - Doubles breakdown $134,200: Participation fee 3 matches $289,800: 3 RR wins @ $96,600/each $178,500: Semifinal win $356,800: Final win $959,300: Total prize money for undefeated champions

Additional prizes include the ATP Finals trophy and the ATP year-end No. 1 trophy, all made by London-based silversmiths Thomas Lyte.

== Qualification ==
=== Singles ===
Eight players compete at the tournament, with two named alternates. Players receive places in the following order of precedence:

1. First, the top 7 players in the ATP Race to Turin after the 2026 Paris Masters.
2. Second, up to two 2026 Grand Slam tournament winners ranked anywhere 8th–20th, in ranking order
3. Third, the eighth ranked player in the ATP rankings

In the event of this totaling more than 8 players, those lower down in the selection order become the alternates. If further alternates are needed, these players are selected by the ATP.

Provisional rankings are published weekly as the ATP Race to Turin, coinciding with the 52-week rolling ATP rankings on the date of selection. Points are accumulated in Grand Slam, ATP Tour, United Cup, ATP Challenger Tour and World Tennis Tour tournaments. Players accrue points across 18 tournaments, usually made up of:

- The 4 Grand Slam tournaments
- The 8 mandatory ATP Masters 1000 tournaments
- The best results from any 6 other tournaments that carry ranking points (Monte-Carlo Masters, United Cup, ATP 500, ATP 250, Challenger, World Tennis)
- Player can replace up to 3 mandatory Masters 1000 results with a better score from ATP 500 or ATP 250

=== Doubles ===
Eight teams compete at the tournament, with one named alternate. The eight competing teams receive places according to the same order of precedence as in singles. The named alternate will be offered first to any unaccepted teams in the selection order, then to the highest ranked unaccepted team, and then to a team selected by the ATP. Points are accumulated in the same competitions as for the singles tournament. However, for doubles teams there are no commitment tournaments, so teams are ranked according to their 18 highest points scoring results from any tournaments on the ATP Tour.

== Qualified players ==
=== Singles ===
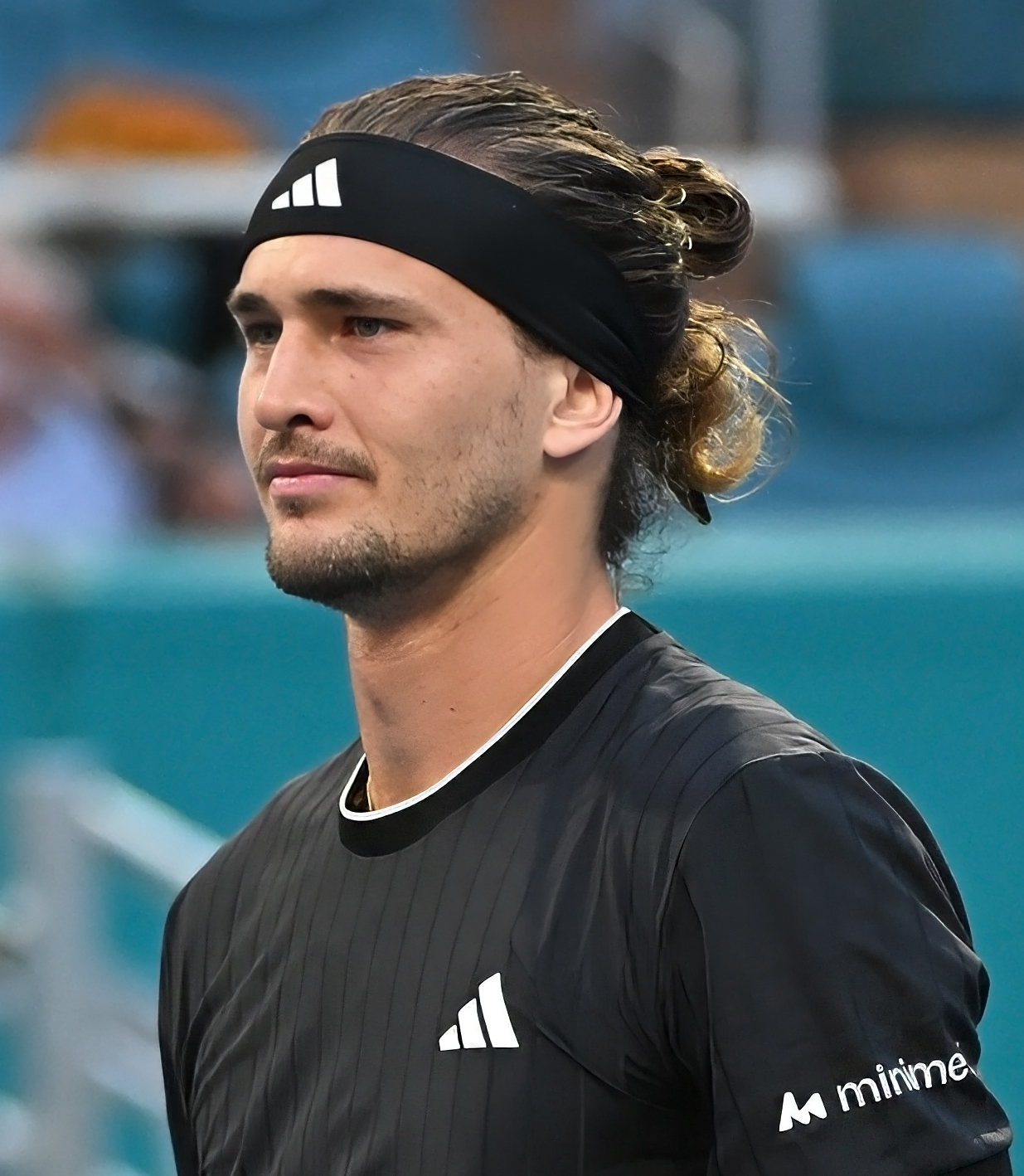
Zverev

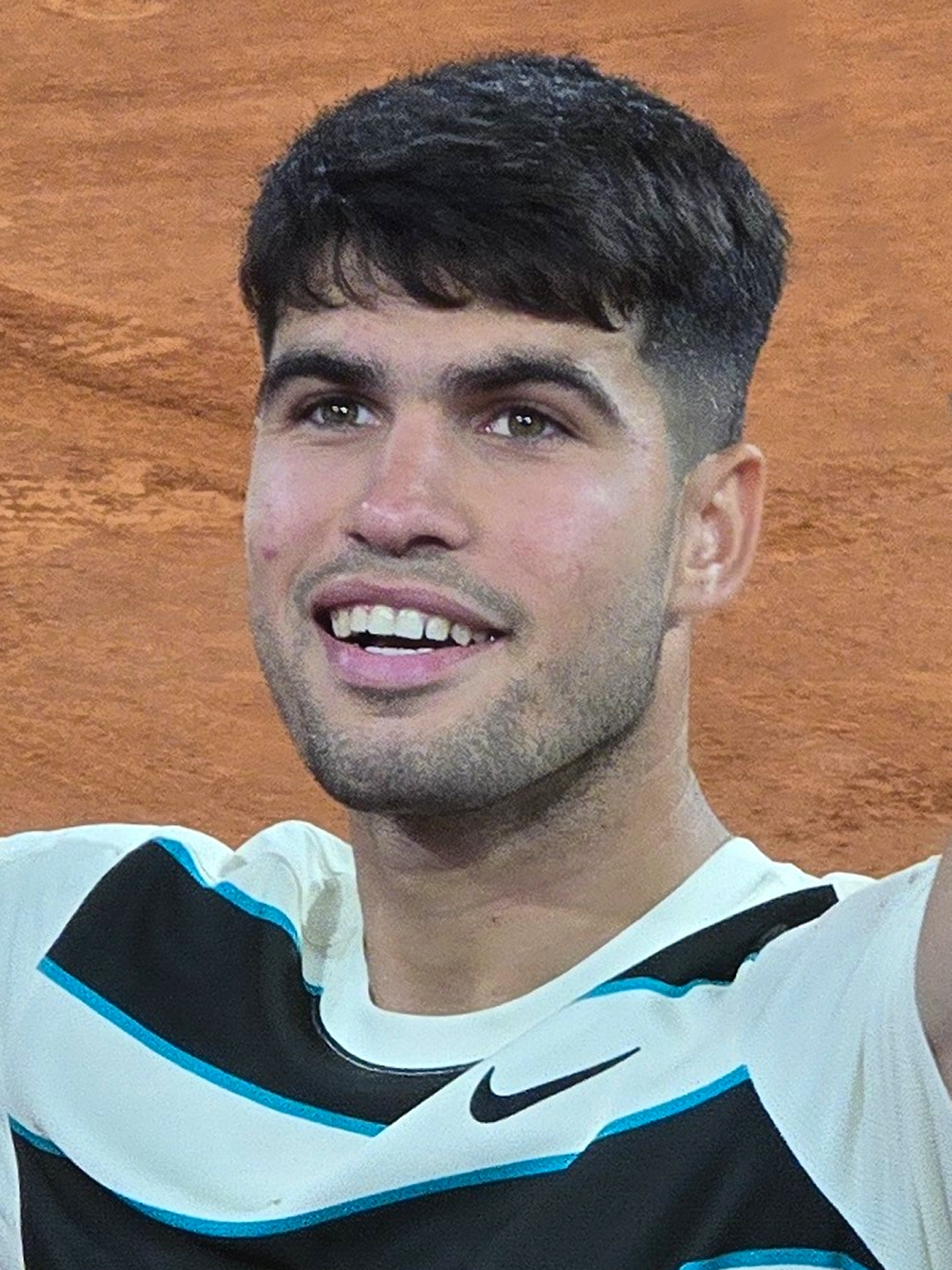
Alcaraz

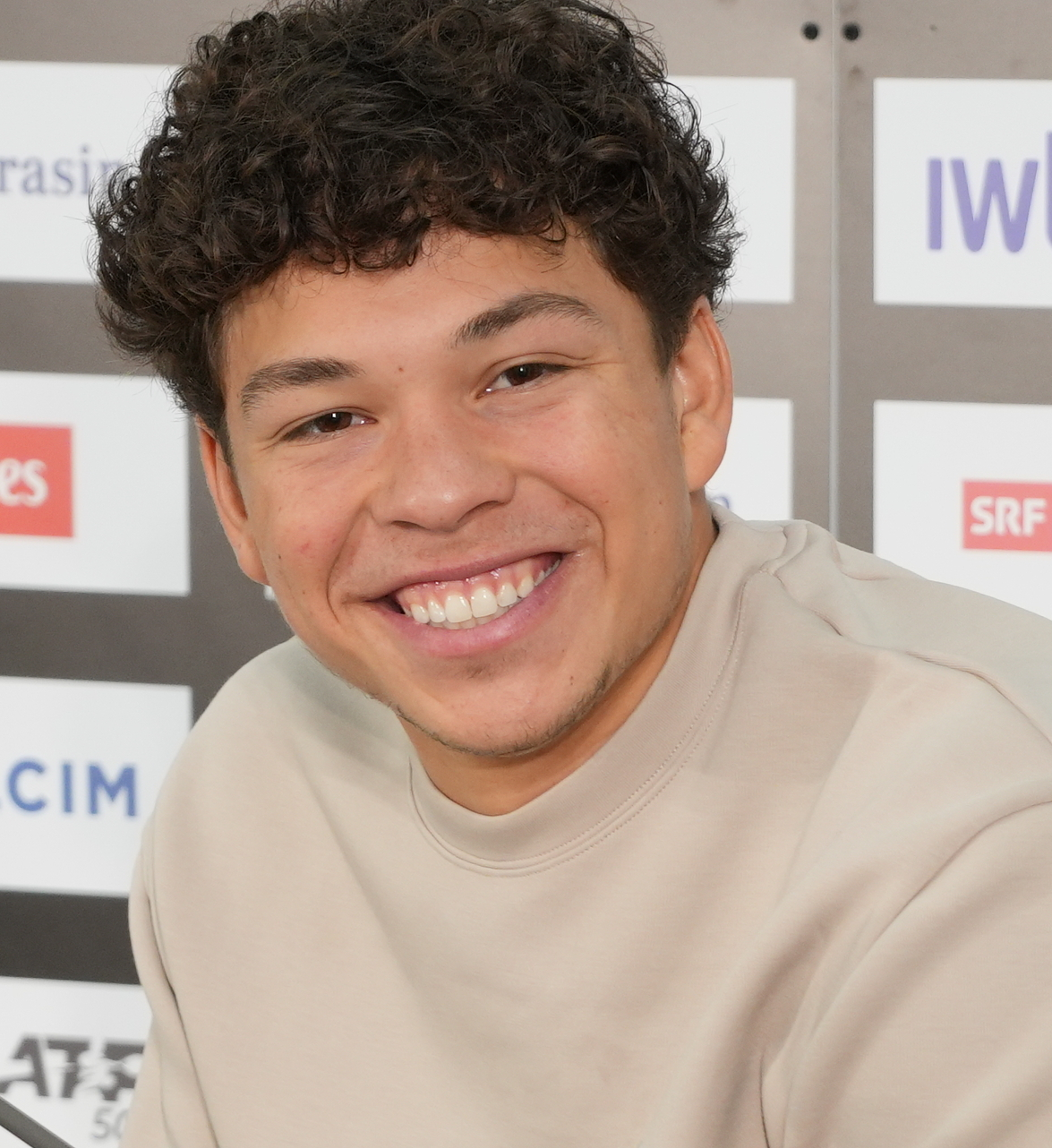
Shelton

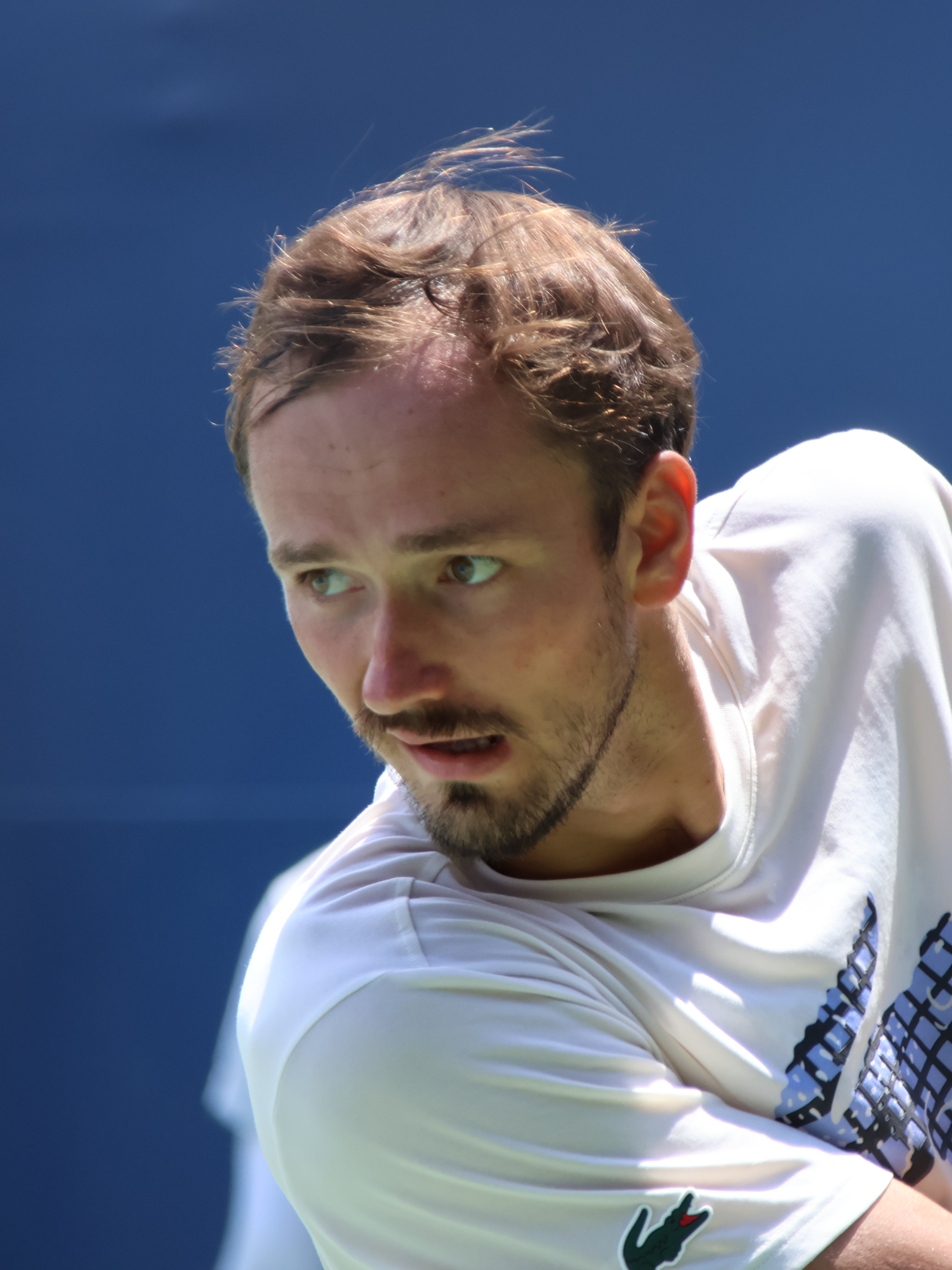
Medvedev

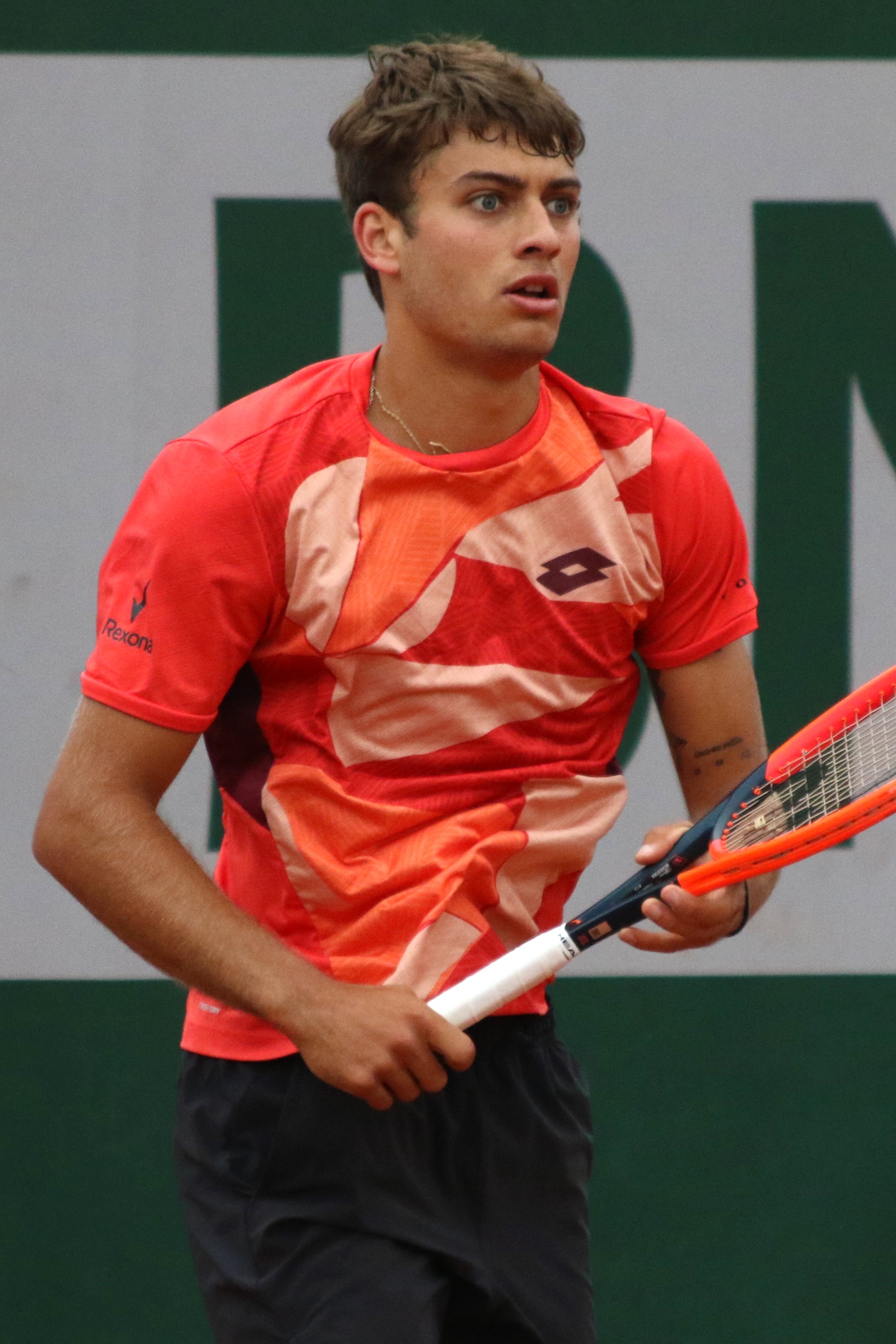
Cobolli

Fils

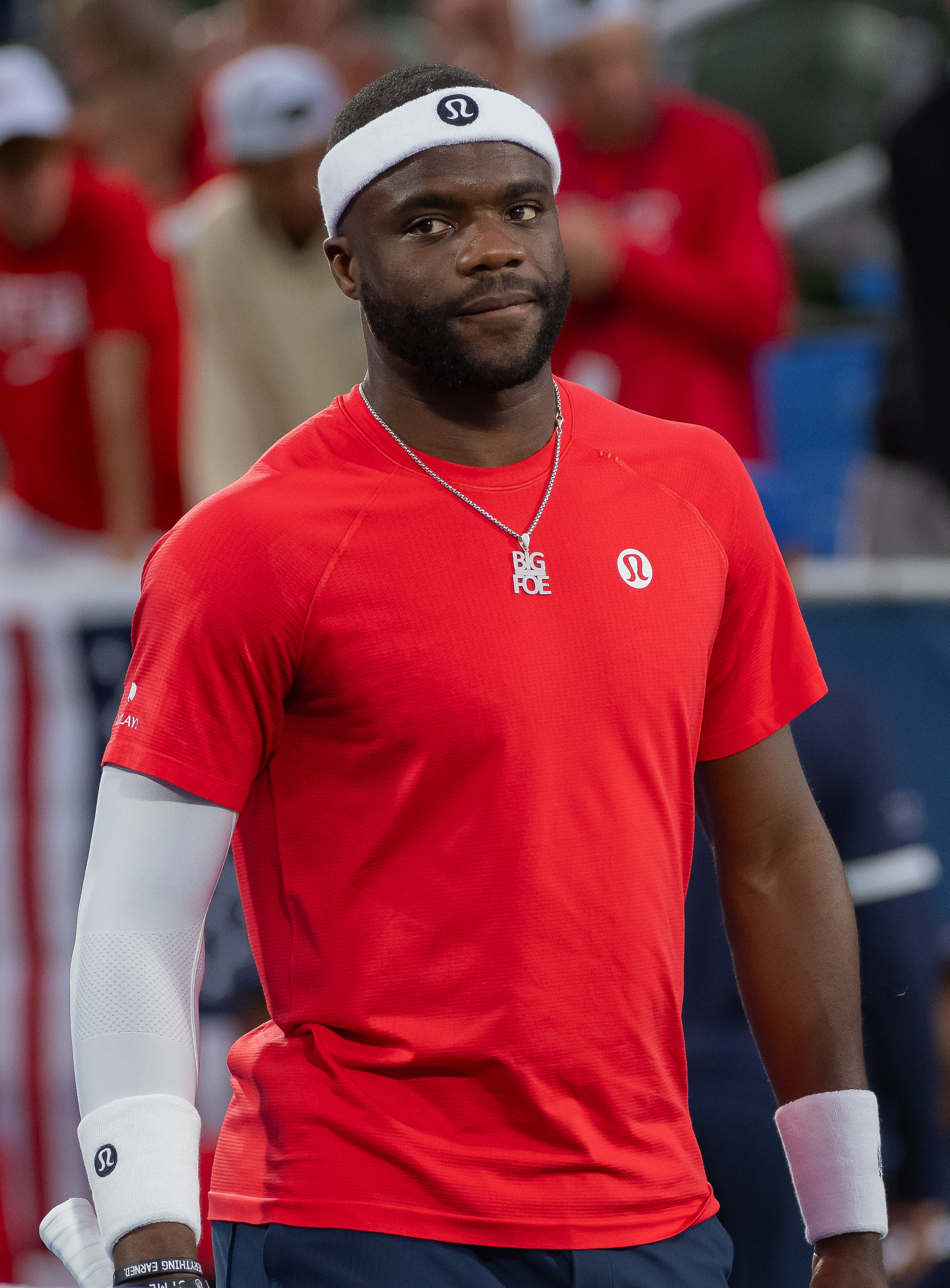
Tiafoe

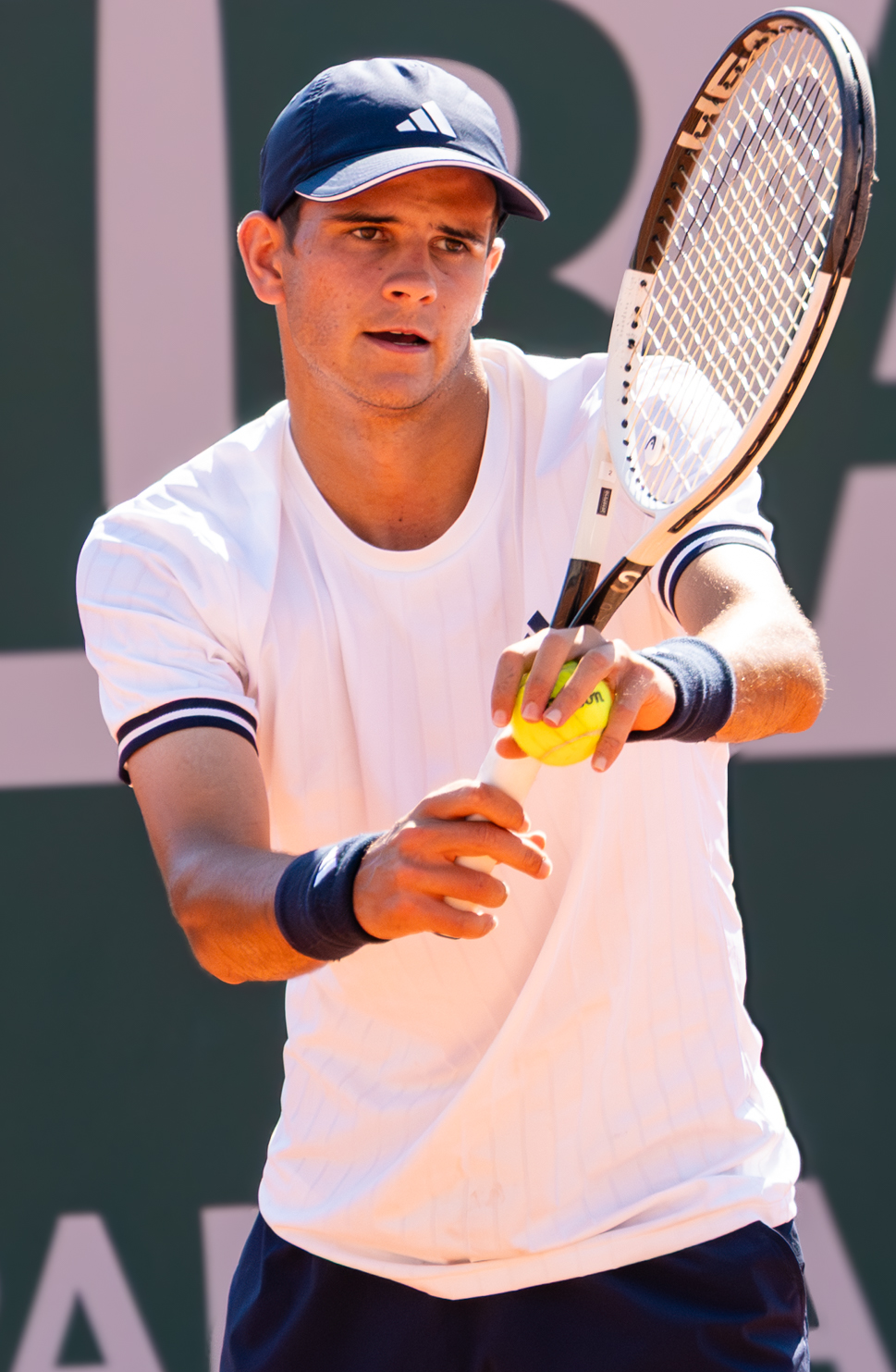
Jódar

#	Player	Date qualified
–^{x}	(Italy) Jannik Sinner	10 July
1	(Germany) Alexander Zverev	6 August
2	(Spain) Carlos Alcaraz	16 September
3	(United States) Ben Shelton	18 October
4	Daniil Medvedev	30 October
5	(Italy) Flavio Cobolli	3 November
6	(France) Arthur Fils	4 November
7	(United States) Frances Tiafoe	6 November
8	(Spain) Rafael Jódar	6 November

^{x} Player withdrew due to injury before the event

=== Doubles ===
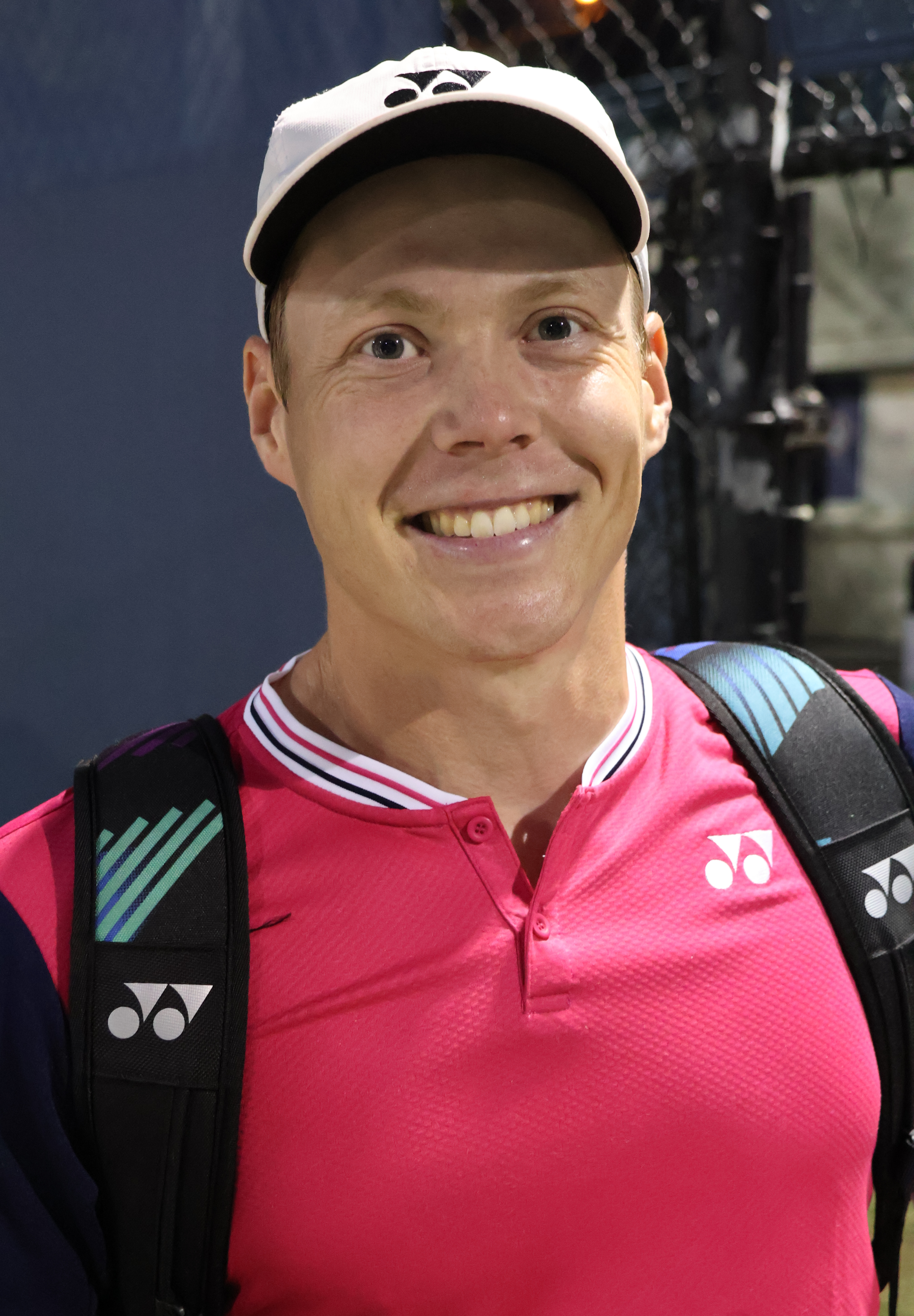
Heliövaara

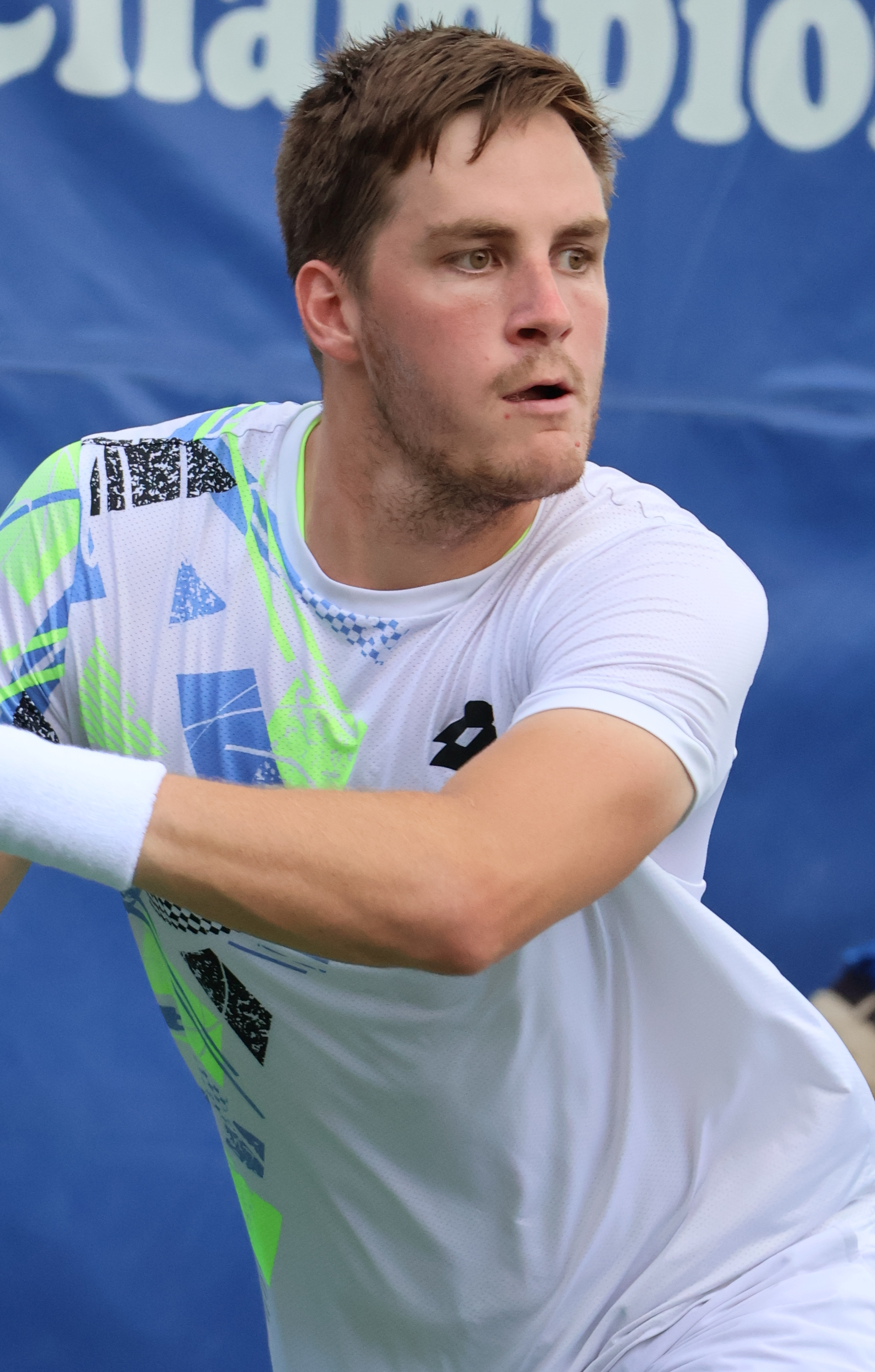
Patten

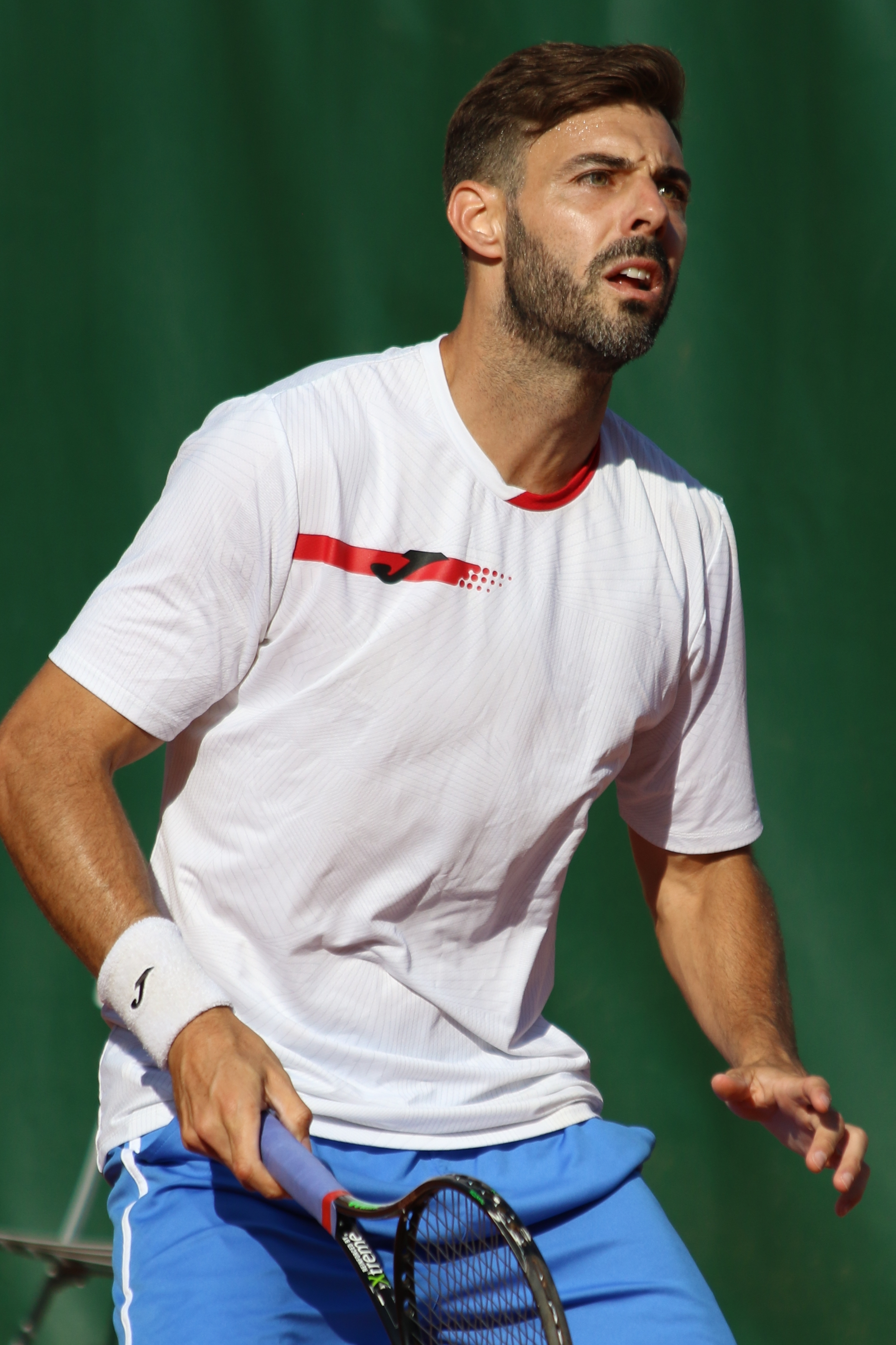
Granollers

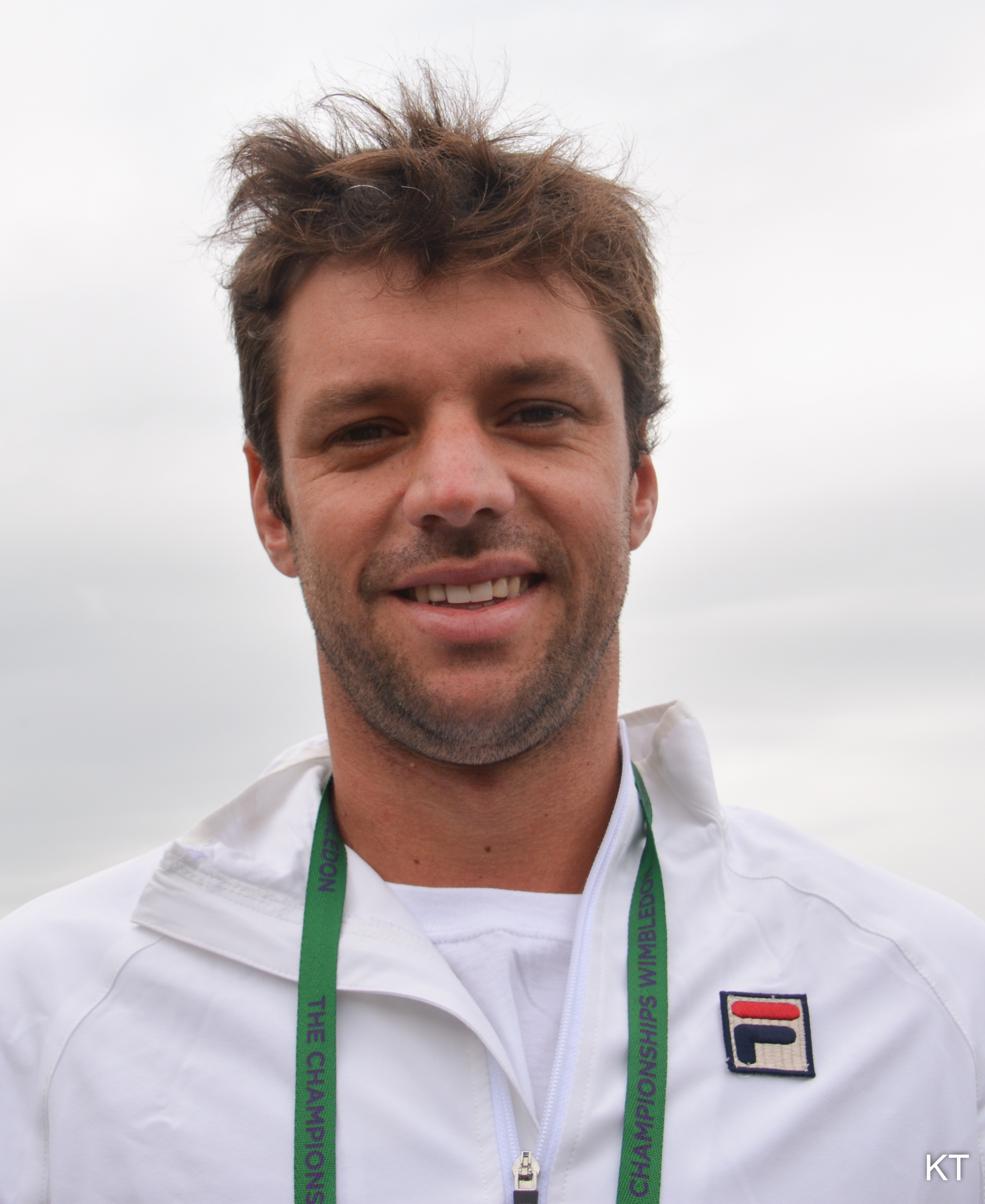
Zeballos

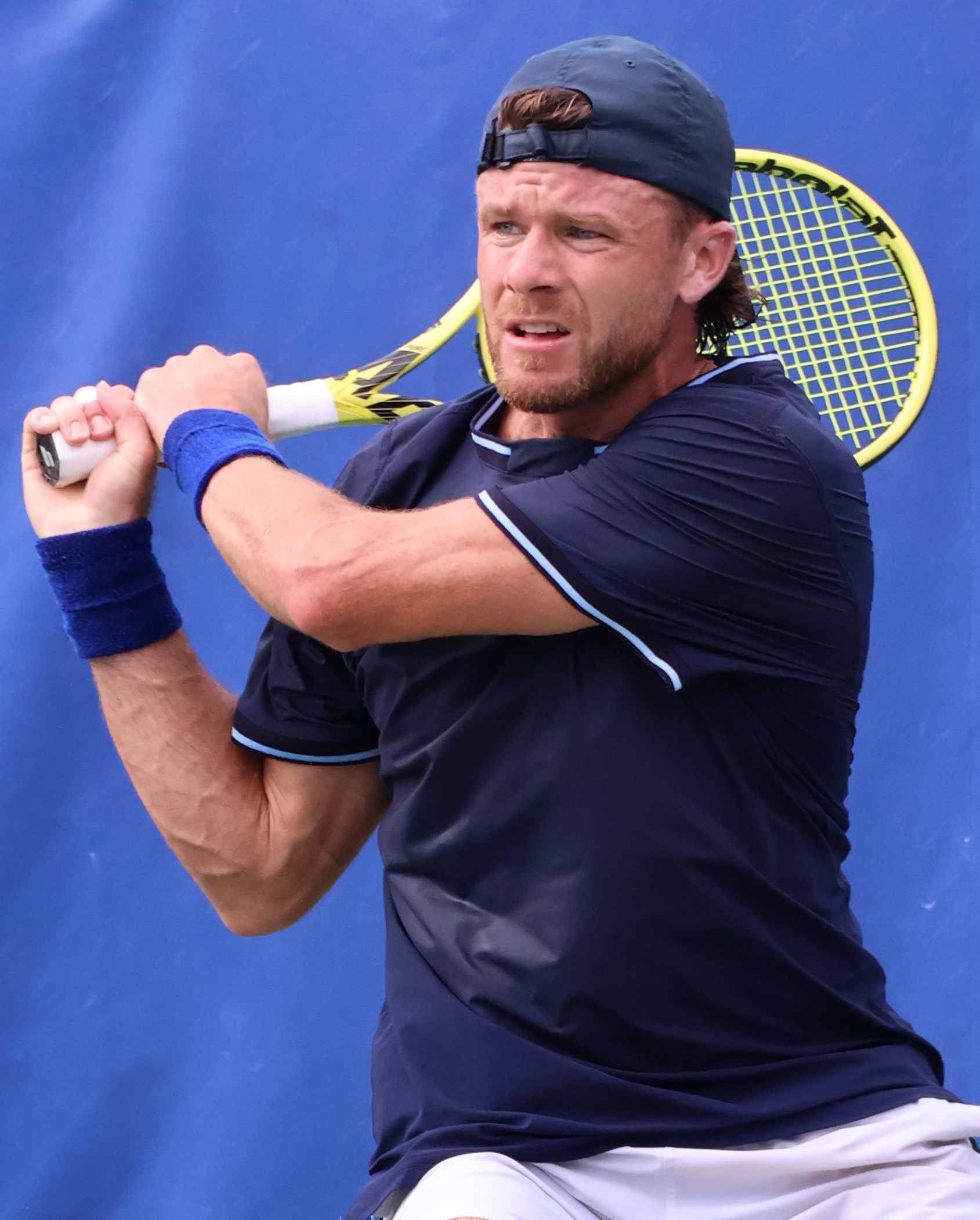
Harrison

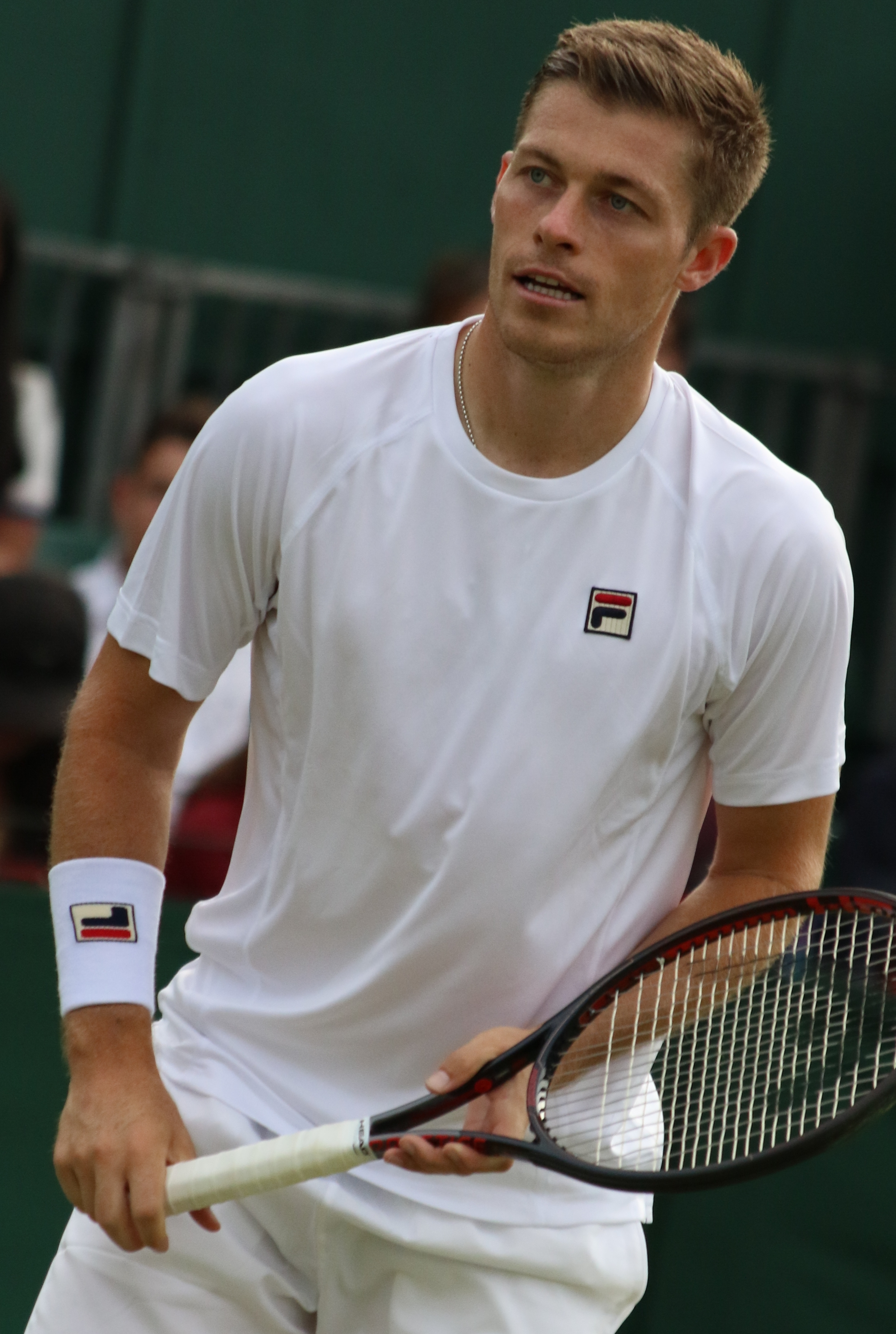
Skupski

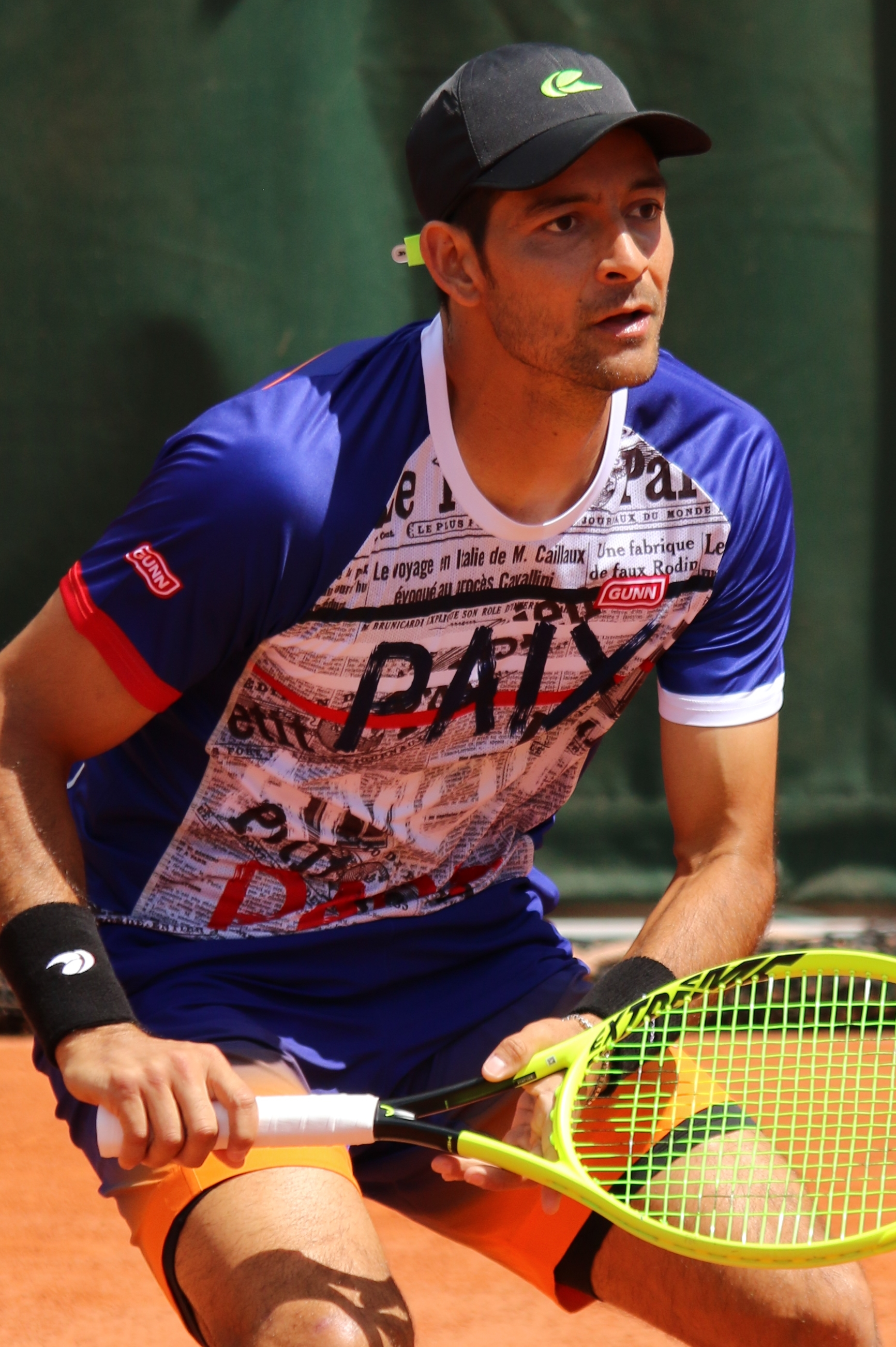
Arévalo

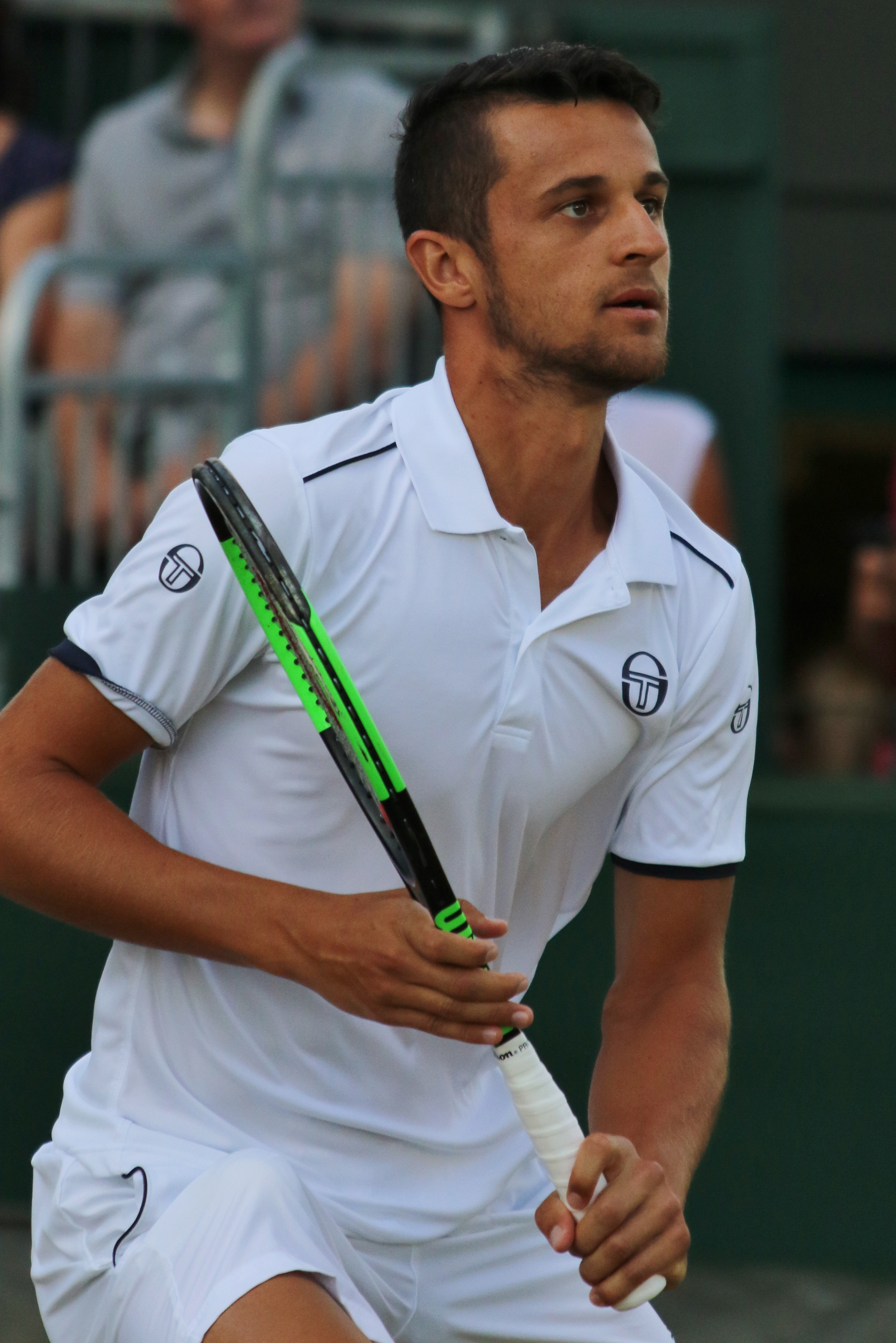
Pavić

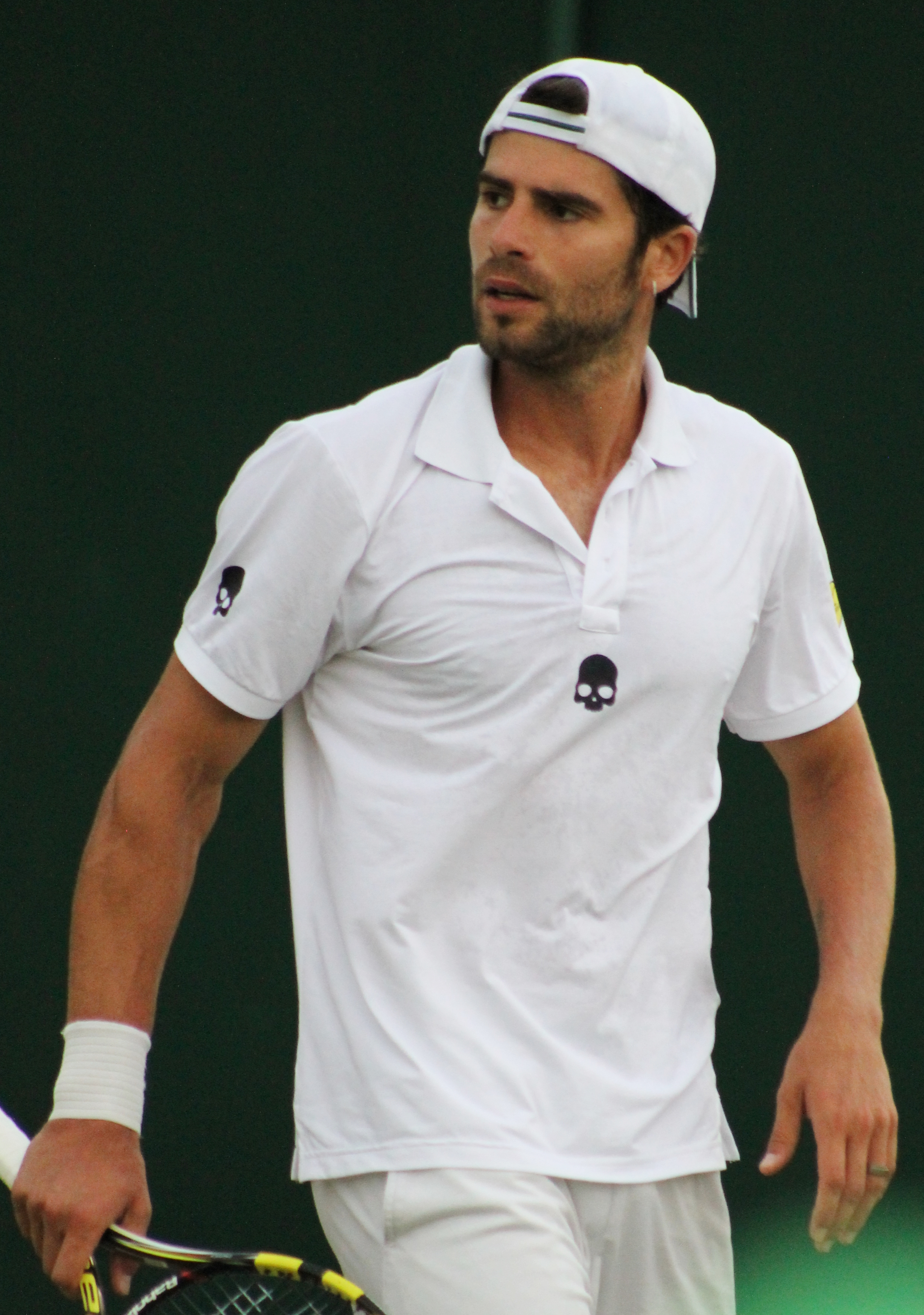
Bolelli

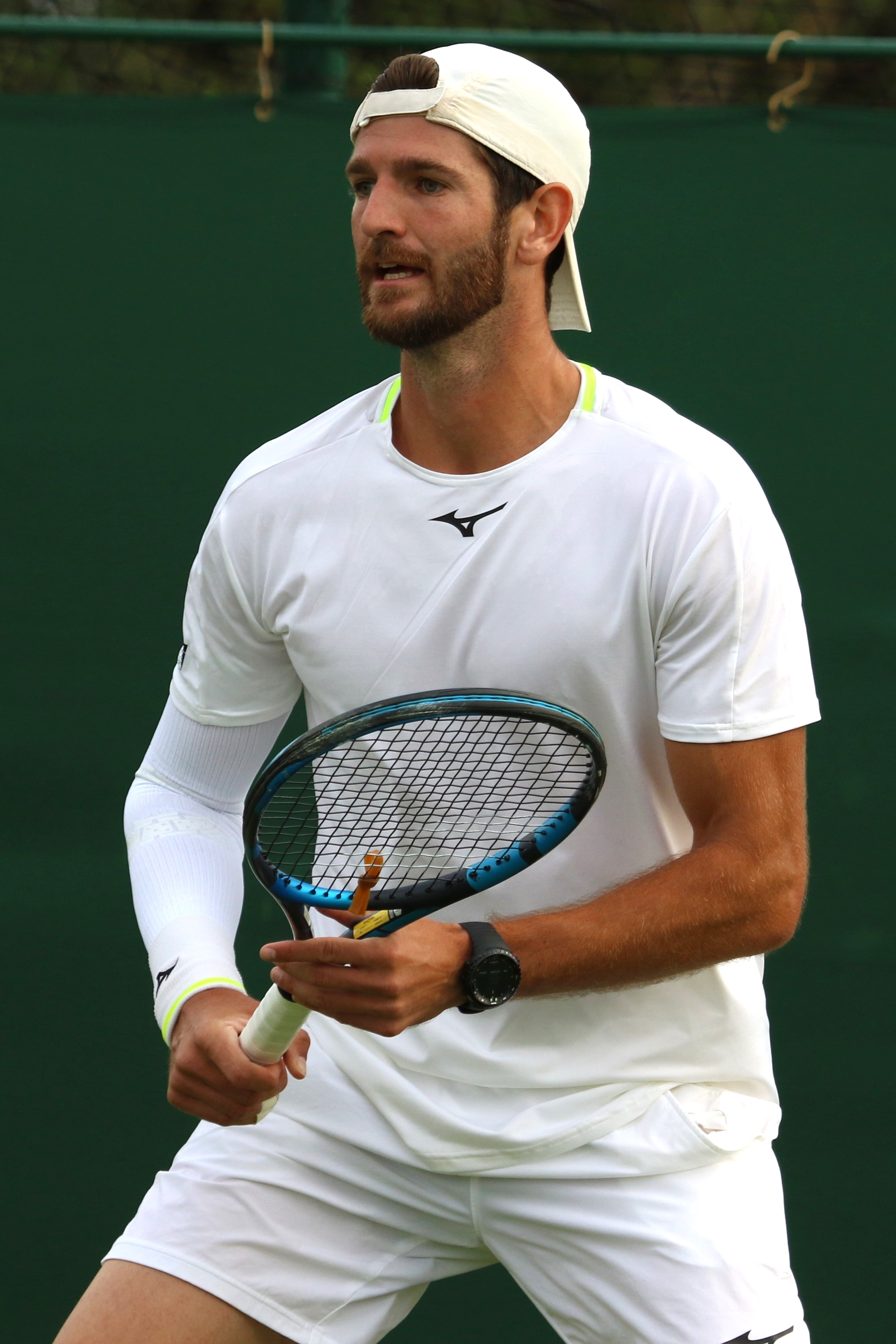
Vavassori

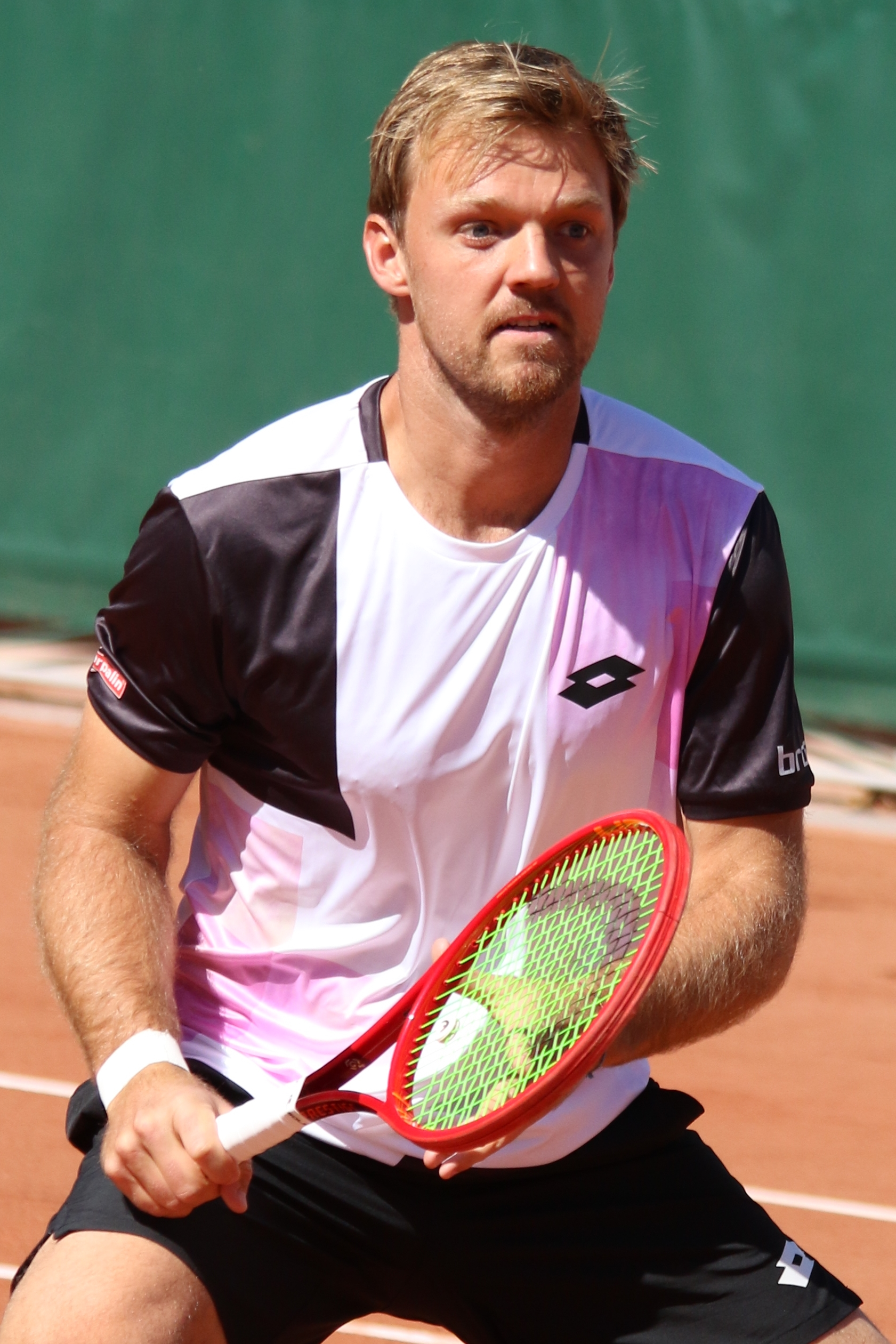
Krawietz

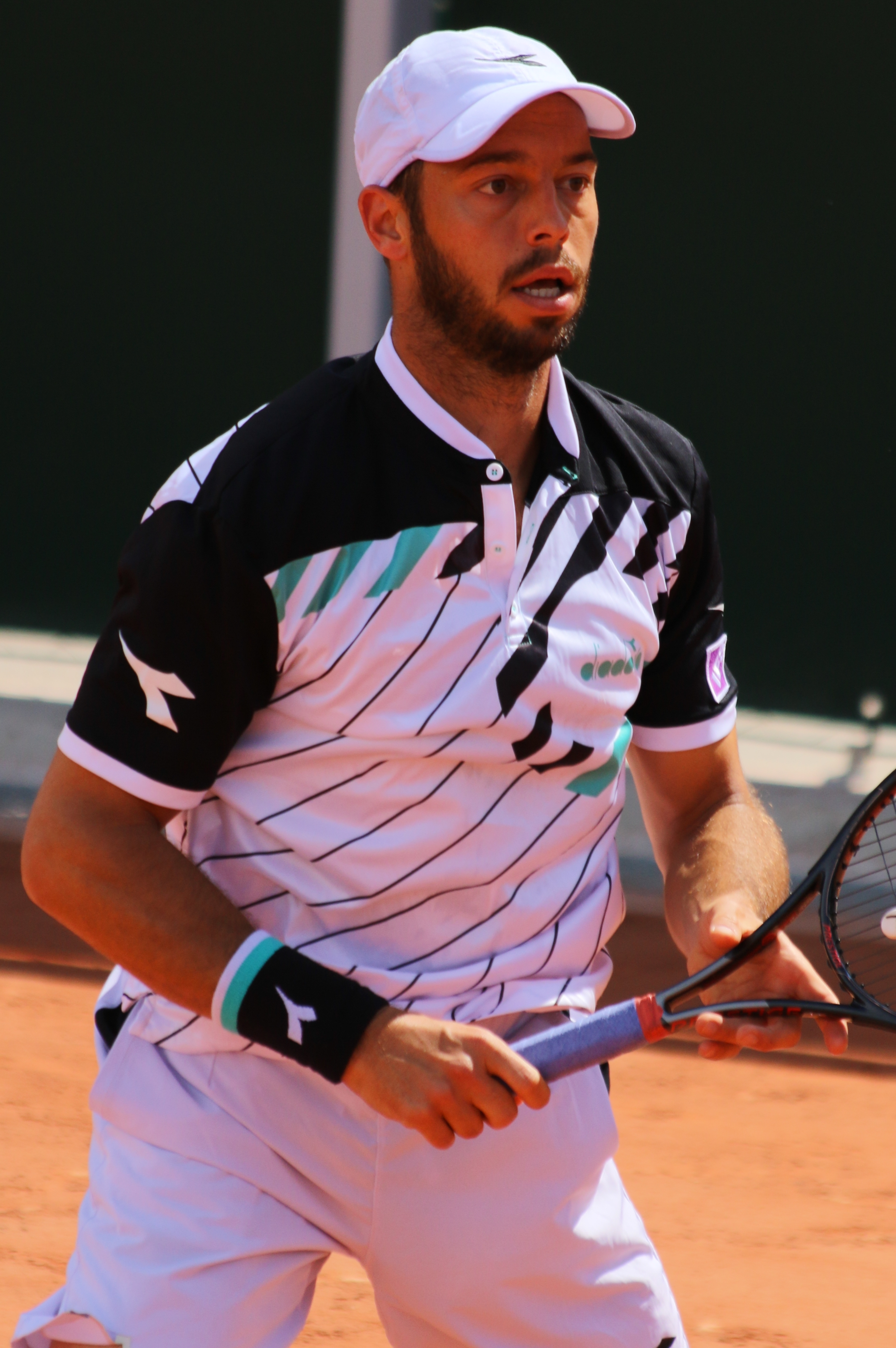
Pütz

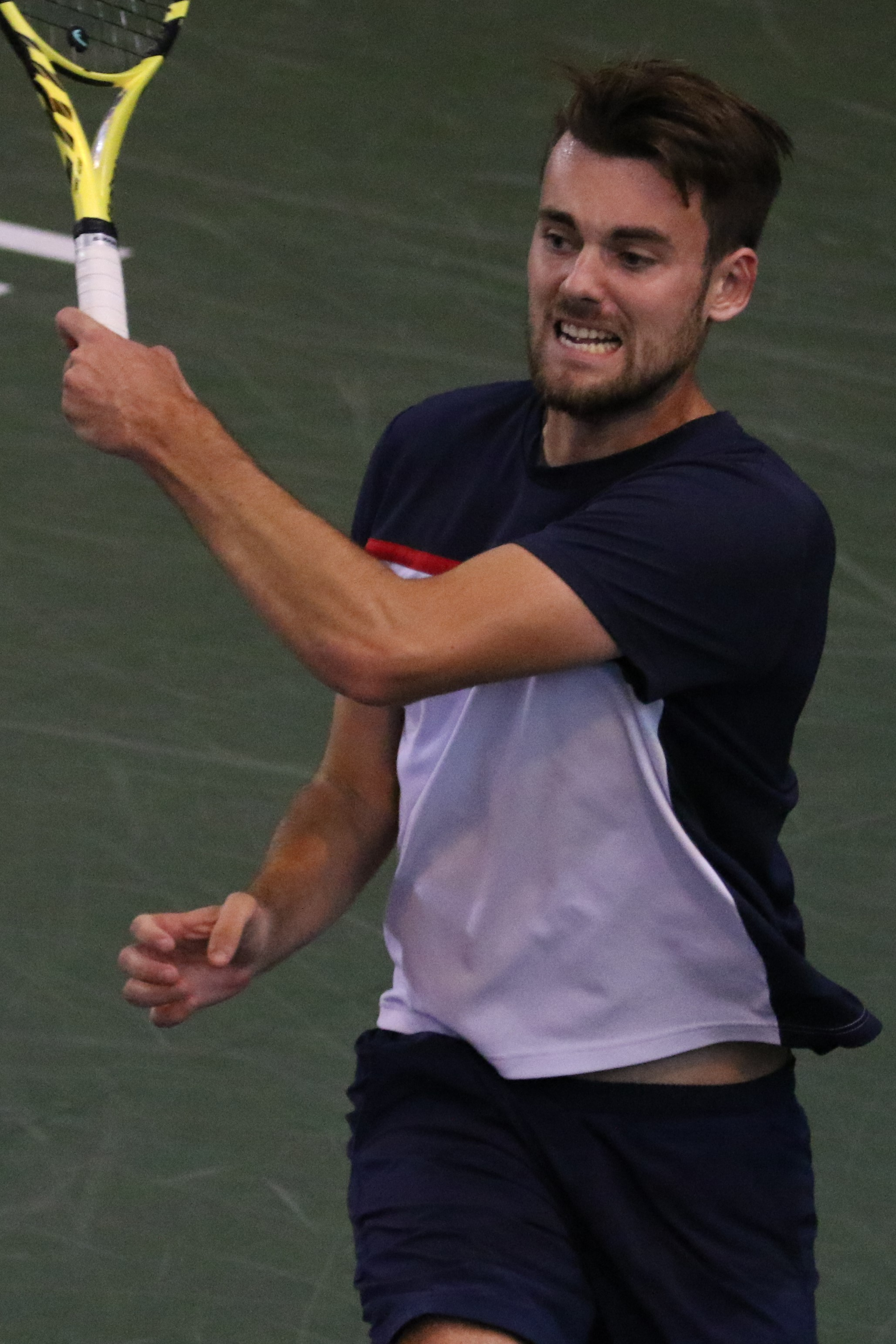
Arribagé

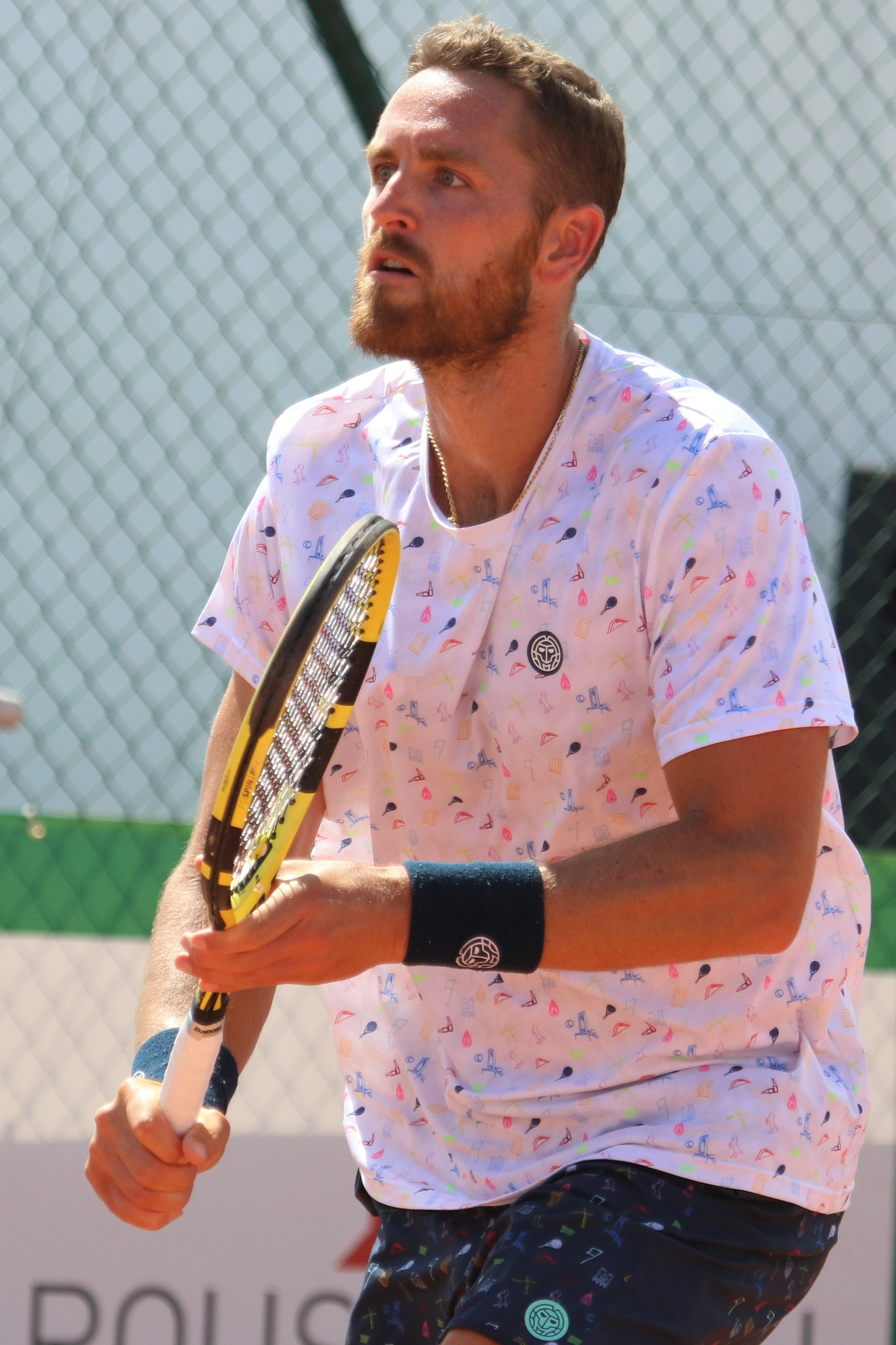
Olivetti

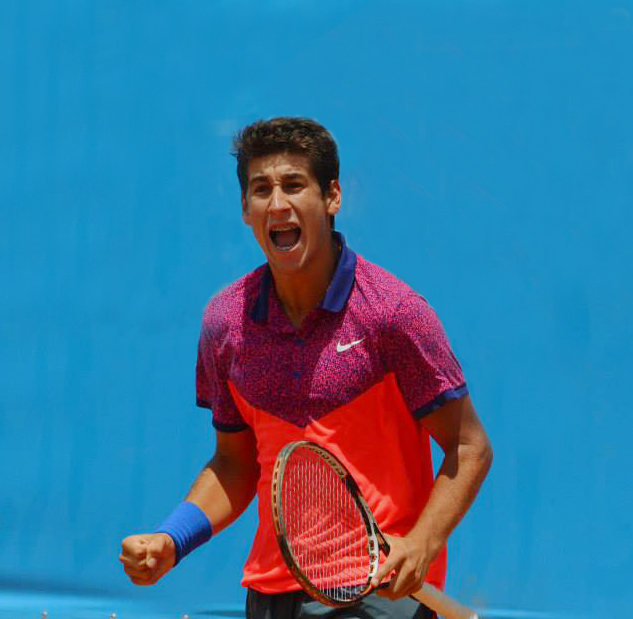
Luz

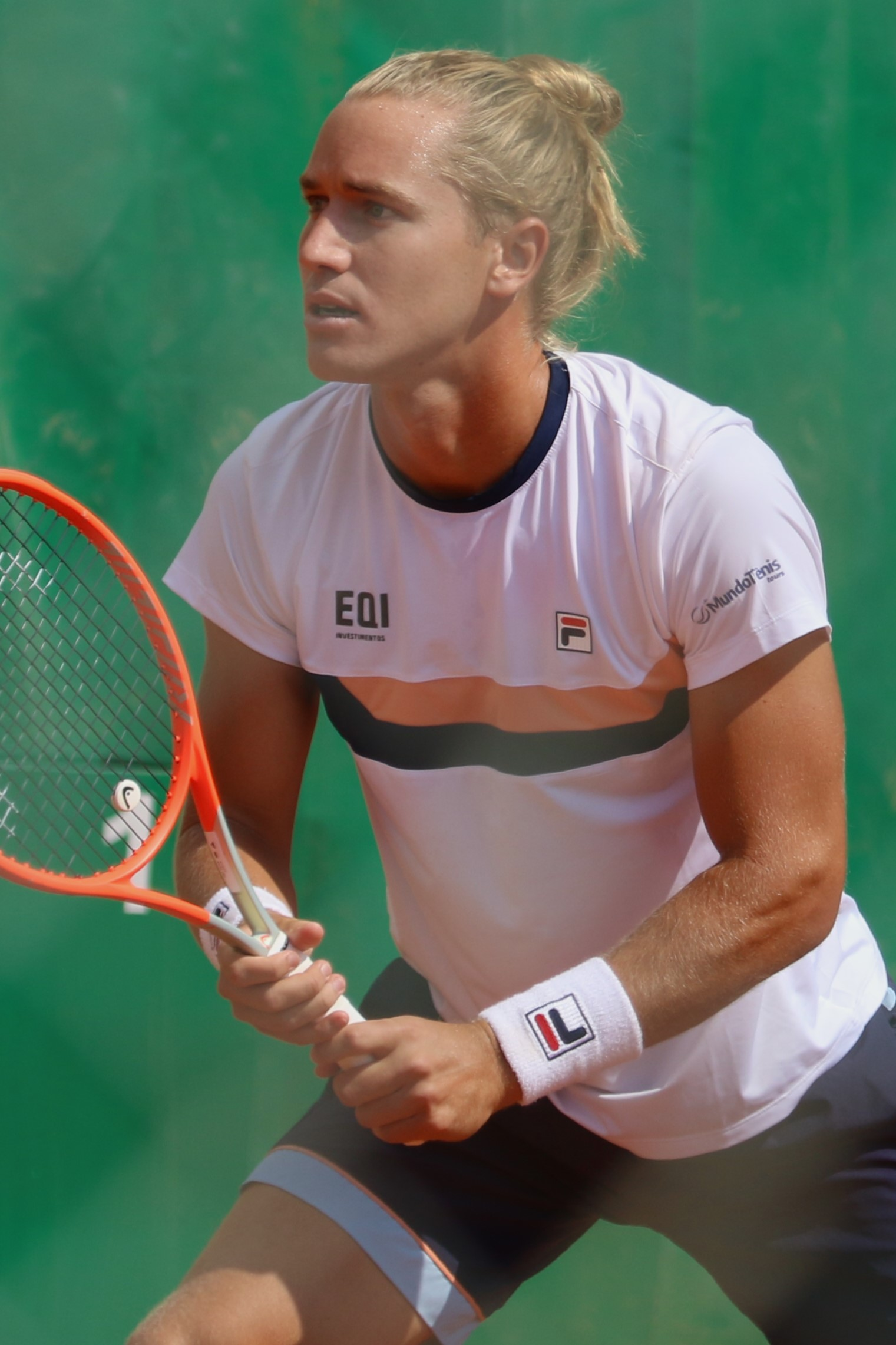
Matos

#	Players	Date qualified
1	(Finland) Harri Heliövaara (United Kingdom) Henry Patten	11 July
2	(Spain) Marcel Granollers (Argentina) Horacio Zeballos	7 September
3	(United States) Christian Harrison (United Kingdom) Neal Skupski	12 September
4	(El Salvador) Marcelo Arévalo (Croatia) Mate Pavić	26 October
5	(Italy) Simone Bolelli (Italy) Andrea Vavassori	28 October
6	(Germany) Kevin Krawietz (Germany) Tim Pütz	3 November
7	(France) Théo Arribagé (France) Albano Olivetti	4 November
8	(Brazil) Orlando Luz (Brazil) Rafael Matos	4 November

== Points breakdown ==
Grand Slam: Australian Open, French Open, Wimbledon, US Open.
Masters: IW = Indian Wells; MI = Miami Open; MA = Madrid Open; IT = Italian Open; CA = Canada Open; CI = Cincinnati Open; SH = Shanghai Masters; PA = Paris Masters
Results: W = Winner; F = Finals; SF= Semifinals; QF= Quarterfinals; R16 = Round of 16; R32 = Round of 32, R64 = Round of 64; R128 = Round of 128; RR = Round Robin; A = absent; Tourn = Number of tournaments.

=== Singles ===
† Player qualified for ATP Finals.
- Player withdrew due to injury.

Rank	Player	Grand Slam				ATP Masters 1000 (mandatory) (Note: Player can replace points from up to three mandatory Masters 1000 with other next-best results. Ranking points are shown in italics in these cases.)								Best other						Total points	Tourn	Titles
Rank	Player	AUS	FRA	WIM	USO	IW	MI	MA	IT	CA	CI	SH	PA	1	2	3	4	5	6	Total points	Tourn	Titles
1^{†}	(Germany) Alexander Zverev	SF; 800	W 2000	F 1300	W 2000	SF; 400	SF; 400	F 650	R16; 100	RR; 40	R16; 100	SF; 400	R32; 10	SF; 400	SF; 200	SF; 200	SF; 200	QF; 100	R16; 50	9,350	19	2
–	(Italy) Jannik Sinner	SF; 800	R64; 50	W 2000	A 0	W 1000	W 1000	W 1000	W 1000	A 0	A 0	A 0	A 0	W 1000	QF; 100					7,950	9	6
2^{†}	(Spain) Carlos Alcaraz	W 2000	A 0	A 0	QF; 400	SF; 400	R32; 50	A 0	A 0	A 0	A 0	R32; 50	W 1000	F 650	W 500	W 500	W 500	R16; 50		6,100	11	5
3^{†}	(United States) Ben Shelton	QF; 400	R64; 50	R128; 10	F 1300	R32; 50	R16; 50	QF; 50	QF; 50	W 1000	R64; 10	R32; 50	F 650	W 500	W 500	W 250	QF; 100	QF; 100	R16; 50	5,170	21	4
4^{†}	Daniil Medvedev	R16; 200	R128; 10	R32; 100	R16; 200	F 650	R32; 50	R16; 100	SF; 400	SF; 100	R32; 50	SF; 400	R32; 10	W 500	W 250	W 250	W 250	SF; 200	QF; 100	3,820	24	4
5^{†}	(Italy) Flavio Cobolli	R128; 10	F 1300	QF; 400	R32; 100	R32; 50	RR; 20	QF; 200	R32; 50	R64; 10	SF; 400	R64; 10	A 0	W 500	F 330	SF; 100	SF; 100	R32; 50	R16; 50	3,680	24	1
6^{†}	(France) Arthur Fils	A 0	A 0	R64; 50	R128; 10	QF; 200	SF; 400	SF; 400	R64; 10	QF; 200	W 1000	R32; 50	R16; 100	W 500	F 330	QF; 125	QF; 100	SF; 100	QF; 50	3,625	18	2
7^{†}	(United States) Frances Tiafoe	R32; 100	R16; 200	R32; 100	SF; 800	R16; 100	QF; 200	A 0	R32; 50	R32; 50	F 650	R32; 50	R32; 10	W 500	F 330	SF; 100	R16; 50	R16; 50	R16; 50	3,390	22	1
8^{†}	(Spain) Rafael Jódar	R64; 80	QF; 400	R32; 100	R128; 10	R32; 25	R32; 70	QF; 200	QF; 200	SF; 400	R16; 100	F 650	R32; 50	F 330	W 250	SF; 200	F 69	R16; 50	R16; 50	3,234	21	1
Alternates
9	(Australia) Alex de Minaur	QF; 400	R32; 100	R16; 200	R64; 50	R32; 50	QF; 100	QF; 100	QF; 85	R32; 50	R16; 100	QF; 200	R32; 10	W 500	F 330	F 330	QF; 200	SF; 200	F 165	3,170	23	1
10 (Note: Players with more points than Auger-Aliassime — Taylor Fritz, Novak Djokovic, Tommy Paul, Jiří Lehečka, Alejandro Davidovich Fokina, and Jakub Menšík — all consecutively withdrew from the second alternate role.)	(Canada) Félix Auger-Aliassime	R128; 10	QF; 400	QF; 400	R64; 50	R16; 100	R32; 50	R32; 50	QF; 50	A 0	R16; 100	R16; 100	RR; 25	F 330	W 250	QF; 200	SF; 200	QF; 100	R16; 50	2,465	19	1

=== Doubles ===
† Team qualified for ATP Finals.

Rank	Team	Points																		Total points	Tourn	Titles
Rank	Team	1	2	3	4	5	6	7	8	9	10	11	12	13	14	15	16	17	18	Total points	Tourn	Titles
1^{†}	(Finland) Harri Heliövaara (United Kingdom) Henry Patten	W 2000	F 1200	W 1000	SF; 720	F 600	W 500	W 500	SF; 360	F 300	W 250	R16; 180	QF; 180	QF; 180	QF; 180	R16; 90	QF; 90	R16; 0		8,330	17	5
2^{†}	(United States) Christian Harrison (United Kingdom) Neal Skupski	W 2000	W 2000	F 600	SF; 360	R16; 180	QF; 180	QF; 180	QF; 180	QF; 180	SF; 180	R32; 90	R16; 90	QF; 90	QF; 90	QF; 90	QF; 90	SF; 90	SF; 90	6,760	22	2
3^{†}	(Spain) Marcel Granollers (Argentina) Horacio Zeballos	W 2000	SF; 720	F 600	QF; 360	SF; 360	SF; 360	SF; 360	F 300	QF; 180	R32; 90	R32; 0	R32; 0	R16; 0						5,330	13	1
4^{†}	(El Salvador) Marcelo Arévalo (Croatia) Mate Pavić	F 1200	F 600	F 600	W 500	QF; 360	QF; 360	F 300	R16; 180	QF; 180	QF; 180	QF; 180	SF; 180	R16; 90	QF; 90	QF; 45	R32; 0	R32; 0	R16; 0	5,045	20	1
5^{†}	(Italy) Simone Bolelli (Italy) Andrea Vavassori	W 1000	W 1000	SF; 720	W 500	QF; 360	R16; 180	QF; 180	SF; 180	SF; 180	SF; 180	R16; 90	QF; 90	QF; 90	SF; 90	R64; 0	R32; 0	R32; 0	R32; 0	4,840	19	3
6^{†}	(France) Théo Arribagé (France) Albano Olivetti	W 500	W 500	W 500	SF; 360	SF; 360	F 300	F 300	W 250	W 250	W 250	QF; 180	QF; 180	F 150	R32; 90	R32; 90	R32; 90	R16; 90	R16; 90	4,530	30	6
7^{†}	(Germany) Kevin Krawietz (Germany) Tim Pütz	F 1200	W 1000	SF; 720	W 500	R16; 180	QF; 180	SF; 180	F 150	R32; 90	R16; 90	R16; 90	R16; 90	R32; 0	R32; 0	R16; 0	R16; 0	R16; 0		4,470	17	2
8^{†}	(Brazil) Orlando Luz (Brazil) Rafael Matos	W 1000	W 1000	QF; 360	W 250	W 250	SF; 180	F 150	F 150	W 125	R16; 90	R16; 90	R16; 90	SF; 90	SF; 60	QF; 45	QF; 45	R16; 20	R64; 0	3,995	30	5
Alternates
9	(Argentina) Guido Andreozzi (France) Manuel Guinard	W 1000	F 600	QF; 360	QF; 360	SF; 360	QF; 180	SF; 180	SF; 180	SF; 180	F 150	QF; 90	QF; 90	QF; 90	SF; 90	QF; 45	R64; 0	R64; 0	R32; 0	3,955	25	1
10	(United Kingdom) Julian Cash (United Kingdom) Lloyd Glasspool	W 500	W 500	W 500	QF; 360	F 300	W 250	R16; 180	QF; 180	SF; 180	SF; 180	F 150	R32; 90	R32; 90	R16; 90	R16; 90	QF; 90	QF; 90	R32; 0	3,820	25	4

== Head-to-head records ==
Below are the head-to-head records as they approached the tournament.

=== Singles ===
		Zverev	Alcaraz	Shelton	Medvedev	Cobolli	Fils	Tiafoe	Jódar	Overall	YTD W–L
1	(Germany) Alexander Zverev		6–7	6–0	8–14	4–1	5–2	9–1	1–0	39–25	65–18
2	(Spain) Carlos Alcaraz	7–6		4–1	7–3	1–0	3–0	2–1	0–0	24–11	42–5
3	(United States) Ben Shelton	0–6	1–4		1–0	4–2	2–1	4–1	0–0	12–14	45–19
4	Daniil Medvedev	14–8	3–7	0–1		2–1	2–0	6–2	0–1	27–20	52–20
5	(Italy) Flavio Cobolli	1–4	0–1	2–4	1–2		0–3	1–4	1–0	6–18	36–24
6	(France) Arthur Fils	2–5	0–3	1–2	0–2	3–0		3–0	1–2	10–14	39–16
7	(United States) Frances Tiafoe	1–9	1–2	1–4	2–6	4–1	0–3		0–0	9–25	44–21
8	(Spain) Rafael Jódar	0–1	0–0	0–0	1–0	0–1	2–1	0–0		3–3	45–19

=== Doubles ===
		Heliövaara; Patten	Harrison; Skupski	Granollers; Zeballos	Arévalo; Pavić	Bolelli; Vavassori	Arribagé; Olivetti	Krawietz; Pütz	Luz; Matos	Overall	YTD W–L
1	(Finland) Harri Heliövaara (United Kingdom) Henry Patten		1–1	3–2	5–3	5–3	1–0	2–1	0–0	17–10	49–12
2	(United States) Christian Harrison (United Kingdom) Neal Skupski	1–1		1–0	1–1	1–2	0–1	1–1	5–1	10–7	37–20
3	(Spain) Marcel Granollers (Argentina) Horacio Zeballos	2–3	0–1		4–1	3–3	1–1	4–0	1–0	15–9	30–12
4	(El Salvador) Marcelo Arévalo (Croatia) Mate Pavić	3–5	1–1	1–4		4–3	1–1	3–6	0–1	13–21	39–19
5	(Italy) Simone Bolelli (Italy) Andrea Vavassori	3–5	2–1	3–3	3–4		0–0	3–4	0–2	14–19	36–16
6	(France) Théo Arribagé (France) Albano Olivetti	0–1	1–0	1–1	1–1	0–0		1–0	3–0	7–3	55–23
7	(Germany) Kevin Krawietz (Germany) Tim Pütz	1–2	1–1	0–4	6–3	4–3	0–1		0–1	12–15	32–14
8	(Brazil) Orlando Luz (Brazil) Rafael Matos	0–0	1–5	0–1	1–0	2–0	0–3	1–0		5–9	40–25

== See also ==
- ATP rankings
- 2026 ATP Tour
- 2026 WTA Finals
- ATP Finals appearances
