= 2026 BNP Paribas Open – Men's doubles =

Men's doubles
- 2026 BNP Paribas Open

Final
- Champions: (Argentina) Guido Andreozzi (France) Manuel Guinard
- Runners-up: (France) Arthur Rinderknech (Monaco) Valentin Vacherot
- Score: 7–6^{(7–3)}, 6–3

Details
- Draw: 32 (3 WC)
- Seeds: 8

Events
Singles	men	women
Doubles	men	women	mixed
- BNP Paribas Open

Guido Andreozzi and Manuel Guinard defeated Arthur Rinderknech and Valentin Vacherot in the final, 7–6^{(7–3)}, 6–3 to win the men's doubles tennis title at the 2026 Indian Wells Open. It was the first ATP Masters 1000 title for Andreozzi and second for Guinard, as well as the fourth career ATP Tour title for Andreozzi and third for Guinard.

Marcelo Arévalo and Mate Pavić were the defending champions, but lost in the first round to Novak Djokovic and Stefanos Tsitsipas.

Neal Skupski retained the ATP No. 1 doubles ranking after Horacio Zeballos lost in the semifinals. Lloyd Glasspool was also in contention at the beginning of the tournament.

== Seeds ==
1. (Spain) Marcel Granollers / (Argentina) Horacio Zeballos (semifinals)
2. (United Kingdom) Julian Cash / (United Kingdom) Lloyd Glasspool (first round)
3. (El Salvador) Marcelo Arévalo / (Croatia) Mate Pavić (first round)
4. (United States) Christian Harrison / (United Kingdom) Neal Skupski (quarterfinals)
5. (Germany) Kevin Krawietz / (Germany) Tim Pütz (second round)
6. (Monaco) Hugo Nys / (France) Édouard Roger-Vasselin (first round)
7. (Portugal) Francisco Cabral / (Austria) Lucas Miedler (second round)
8. (United Kingdom) Luke Johnson / (Poland) Jan Zieliński (first round)

== Draw ==
Key

- Q = Qualifier
- WC = Wild card
- LL = Lucky loser
- Alt = Alternate
- ITF = ITF entry
- PR = Protected ranking
- SR = Special ranking
- SE = Special exempt
- JE = Junior exempt
- JR = Junior Accelerator Programme entrant
- CO = College Accelerator Programme entrant
- NG = Next Gen Accelerator Program entrant
- w/o = Walkover
- r = Retired
- d = Defaulted

=== Finals ===
Semifinals
1	(Spain) Marcel Granollers (Argentina) Horacio Zeballos	7^{15}	3	[5]
(Argentina) Guido Andreozzi (France) Manuel Guinard	6^{13}	6	[10]
(France) Arthur Rinderknech (Monaco) Valentin Vacherot	7	6^{3}	[10]
(India) Yuki Bhambri (Sweden) André Göransson	5	7^{7}	[5]

Final
(Argentina) Guido Andreozzi (France) Manuel Guinard	7^{7}	6
(France) Arthur Rinderknech (Monaco) Valentin Vacherot	6^{3}	3

=== Top half ===
First round
1	(Spain) M Granollers (Argentina) H Zeballos	6	6
WC	(United States) R Opelka (Italy) J Sinner	4	4
(Kazakhstan) A Bublik (Hungary) F Marozsán	2	2
(France) S Doumbia (France) F Reboul	6	6
Alt	(Germany) C Frantzen (Netherlands) R Haase	7^{7}	7
Alt	(United States) A Krajicek (Croatia) N Mektić	6^{5}	5
(United States) B Nakashima (United States) F Tiafoe	6	3	[5]
5	(Germany) K Krawietz (Germany) T Pütz	4	6	[10]
4	(United States) C Harrison (United Kingdom) N Skupski	4	6	[14]
(Argentina) F Cerúndolo (Italy) L Darderi	6	3	[12]
(Canada) G Diallo (United States) E King	2	2
Alt	(Brazil) O Luz (Brazil) R Matos	6	6
(Australia) A de Minaur (Australia) J Peers	4	6^{3}
(Argentina) G Andreozzi (France) M Guinard	6	7^{7}
(United States) R Cash (United States) JJ Tracy	2	6	[8]
7	(Portugal) F Cabral (Austria) L Miedler	6	3	[10]

Second round
1	(Spain) M Granollers (Argentina) H Zeballos	2	6	[10]
(France) S Doumbia (France) F Reboul	6	3	[5]
Alt	(Germany) C Frantzen (Netherlands) R Haase	6	7^{12}
5	(Germany) K Krawietz (Germany) T Pütz	4	6^{10}
4	(United States) C Harrison (United Kingdom) N Skupski	6	6
Alt	(Brazil) O Luz (Brazil) R Matos	3	4
(Argentina) G Andreozzi (France) M Guinard	6	6
7	(Portugal) F Cabral (Austria) L Miedler	4	4

Quarterfinals
1	(Spain) M Granollers (Argentina) H Zeballos	6	6
Alt	(Germany) C Frantzen (Netherlands) R Haase	4	2
4	(United States) C Harrison (United Kingdom) N Skupski	6	3	[8]
(Argentina) G Andreozzi (France) M Guinard	3	6	[10]

Semifinals
1	(Spain) M Granollers (Argentina) H Zeballos	7^{15}	3	[5]
(Argentina) G Andreozzi (France) M Guinard	6^{13}	6	[10]

=== Bottom half ===
First round
6	(Monaco) H Nys (France) É Roger-Vasselin	6	6^{6}	[5]
K Khachanov; A Rublev	4	7^{8}	[10]
Alt	(Brazil) M Melo (Germany) A Zverev	7^{8}	2	[5]
(Canada) F Auger-Aliassime (United States) S Korda	6^{6}	6	[10]
D Medvedev (United States) L Tien	5	3
(France) A Rinderknech (Monaco) V Vacherot	7	6
WC	(Serbia) N Djokovic (Greece) S Tsitsipas	6	6
3	(El Salvador) M Arévalo (Croatia) M Pavić	3	2
8	(United Kingdom) L Johnson (Poland) J Zieliński	7^{7}	5	[8]
Alt	(Austria) A Erler (Italy) A Vavassori	6^{5}	7	[10]
(France) T Arribagé (France) A Olivetti	4	6	[7]
(Argentina) M González (Argentina) A Molteni	6	4	[10]
PR	(France) F Martin (Netherlands) D Pel	1	3
(India) Y Bhambri (Sweden) A Göransson	6	6
(Netherlands) S Arends (Czech Republic) J Lehečka	6	6
2	(United Kingdom) J Cash (United Kingdom) L Glasspool	3	4

Second round
K Khachanov; A Rublev	7^{7}	4	[10]
(Canada) F Auger-Aliassime (United States) S Korda	6^{3}	6	[5]
(France) A Rinderknech (Monaco) V Vacherot	7^{7}	7
WC	(Serbia) N Djokovic (Greece) S Tsitsipas	6^{4}	5
Alt	(Austria) A Erler (Italy) A Vavassori	6	7^{7}
(Argentina) M González (Argentina) A Molteni	3	6^{3}
(India) Y Bhambri (Sweden) A Göransson	6	6
(Netherlands) S Arends (Czech Republic) J Lehečka	4	4

Quarterfinals
K Khachanov; A Rublev	3	4
(France) A Rinderknech (Monaco) V Vacherot	6	6
Alt	(Austria) A Erler (Italy) A Vavassori	3	6^{2}
(India) Y Bhambri (Sweden) A Göransson	6	7^{7}

Semifinals
(France) A Rinderknech (Monaco) V Vacherot	7	6^{3}	[10]
(India) Y Bhambri (Sweden) A Göransson	5	7^{7}	[5]

== Seeded teams ==
The following are the seeded teams. Seedings are based on ATP rankings as of March 2, 2026.

Country	Player	Country	Player	Rank	Seed
ESP	Marcel Granollers	ARG	Horacio Zeballos	5	1
GBR	Julian Cash	GBR	Lloyd Glasspool	9	2
ESA	Marcelo Arévalo	CRO	Mate Pavić	12	3
USA	Christian Harrison	GBR	Neal Skupski	12	4
GER	Kevin Krawietz	GER	Tim Pütz	24	5
MON	Hugo Nys	FRA	Édouard Roger-Vasselin	35	6
POR	Francisco Cabral	AUT	Lucas Miedler	40	7
GBR	Luke Johnson	POL	Jan Zieliński	49	8

== Other entry information ==
=== Wildcards ===
- (Serbia) Novak Djokovic / (Greece) Stefanos Tsitsipas
- ~~(United States) Emilio Nava / (United States) Ben Shelton~~
- (United States) Reilly Opelka / (Italy) Jannik Sinner

=== Protected ranking ===
- (France) Fabrice Martin / (Netherlands) David Pel

=== Alternates ===
- (Austria) Alexander Erler / (Italy) Andrea Vavassori
- (Germany) Constantin Frantzen / (Netherlands) Robin Haase
- (United States) Austin Krajicek / (Croatia) Nikola Mektić
- (Brazil) Orlando Luz / (Brazil) Rafael Matos
- (Brazil) Marcelo Melo / (Germany) Alexander Zverev

=== Withdrawals ===
- (Italy) Simone Bolelli / (Italy) Andrea Vavassori → replaced by (Austria) Alexander Erler / (Italy) Andrea Vavassori
- (Italy) Flavio Cobolli / (France) Corentin Moutet → replaced by (Brazil) Orlando Luz / (Brazil) Rafael Matos
- (Spain) Alejandro Davidovich Fokina / (France) Arthur Fils → replaced by (Germany) Constantin Frantzen / (Netherlands) Robin Haase
- (Finland) Harri Heliövaara / (United Kingdom) Henry Patten → replaced by (Brazil) Marcelo Melo / (Germany) Alexander Zverev
- (United States) Emilio Nava / (United States) Ben Shelton → replaced by (United States) Austin Krajicek / (Croatia) Nikola Mektić
