= Current tennis rankings =

Tennis player rankings

The ATP and WTA rankings are updated weekly on Mondays (UTC) or at the conclusion of a two-week tournament.

As of 1 March 2022, the ATP and WTA announced that Russian and Belarusian players continue to be allowed to compete in international tennis events on Tour and at the Grand Slams. However, they will not compete under the name or flag of Russia or Belarus, due to the Russian invasion of Ukraine.

== ATP singles ==
ATP rankings (singles) as of 16 November 2026
No.	Player	Points	Move
1	Alexander Zverev (GER)	9,350	Steady
2	Jannik Sinner (ITA)	7,950	Steady
3	Carlos Alcaraz (ESP)	6,100	Steady
4	Ben Shelton (USA)	5,170	Steady
5	Daniil Medvedev	3,820	Steady
6	Flavio Cobolli (ITA)	3,680	Steady
7	Arthur Fils (FRA)	3,625	Steady
8	Frances Tiafoe (USA)	3,390	Steady
9	Taylor Fritz (USA)	3,300	▲1
10	Rafael Jódar (ESP)	3,234	▲1
11	Alex de Minaur (AUS)	3,170	▼2
12	Novak Djokovic (SRB)	2,940	Steady
13	Tommy Paul (USA)	2,925	Steady
14	Jiří Lehečka (CZE)	2,540	▲1
15	Jakub Menšík (CZE)	2,500	▲1
16	Alejandro Davidovich Fokina (ESP)	2,500	▲1
17	Félix Auger-Aliassime (CAN)	2,465	▼3
18	Casper Ruud (NOR)	2,435	Steady
19	Brandon Nakashima (USA)	2,360	Steady
20	Francisco Cerúndolo (ARG)	2,220	Steady

Singles race rankings as of 9 November 2026
No.	Player	Points	Tourn
1	Alexander Zverev (GER) ✓	9,350	19
2	Jannik Sinner (ITA) No	7,950	9
3	Carlos Alcaraz (ESP) ✓	6,100	11
4	Ben Shelton (USA) ✓	5,170	21
5	Daniil Medvedev ✓	3,820	24
6	Flavio Cobolli (ITA) ✓	3,680	24
7	Arthur Fils (FRA) ✓	3,625	18
8	Frances Tiafoe (USA) ✓	3,390	22
9	Rafael Jódar (ESP) ✓	3,234	21
10	Alex de Minaur (AUS)	3,170	23
11	Taylor Fritz (USA)	3,050	20
12	Novak Djokovic (SRB)	2,940	11
13	Tommy Paul (USA)	2,925	23
14	Jiří Lehečka (CZE)	2,540	22
15	Jakub Menšík (CZE)	2,450	20
16	Félix Auger-Aliassime (CAN)	2,440	18
17	Casper Ruud (NOR)	2,435	19
18	Alejandro Davidovich Fokina (ESP)	2,400	19
19	Brandon Nakashima (USA)	2,360	23
20	Francisco Cerúndolo (ARG)	2,220	25

✓ Qualified for the 2026 ATP Finals.
No Qualifiers who withdrew indicated in italics.

== ATP doubles ==
ATP rankings (doubles) as of 9 November 2026
No.	Player	Points	Move
1	Harri Heliövaara (FIN)	9,630	Steady
=	Henry Patten (GBR)	9,630	Steady
3	Neal Skupski (GBR)	7,490	Steady
4	Christian Harrison (USA)	6,580	Steady
5	Horacio Zeballos (ARG)	5,530	Steady
6	Marcel Granollers (ESP)	5,530	Steady
7	Andrea Vavassori (ITA)	5,450	Steady
8	Marcelo Arévalo (ESA)	5,200	Steady
9	Mate Pavić (CRO)	5,200	Steady
10	Simone Bolelli (ITA)	5,150	Steady
11	Kevin Krawietz (GER)	4,940	Steady
12	Tim Pütz (GER)	4,670	Steady
13	Neil Oberleitner (AUT)	3,975	▲6
14	Albano Olivetti (FRA)	3,880	▼1
15	Théo Arribagé (FRA)	3,880	▼1
16	Lucas Miedler (AUT)	3,750	▲4
17	Rafael Matos (BRA)	3,735	Steady
18	Orlando Luz (BRA)	3,735	Steady
19	Manuel Guinard (FRA)	3,730	▼4
20	Guido Andreozzi (ARG)	3,730	▼4

Doubles race rankings as of 9 November 2026
No.	Team	Points	Tourn
1	Harri Heliövaara (FIN) ✓ Henry Patten (GBR) ✓	8,330	17
2	Christian Harrison (USA) ✓ Neal Skupski (GBR) ✓	6,760	22
3	Marcel Granollers (ESP) ✓ Horacio Zeballos (ARG) ✓	5,330	13
4	Marcelo Arévalo (ESA); Mate Pavić (CRO) ✓	5,045	20
5	Simone Bolelli (ITA); Andrea Vavassori (ITA) ✓	4,840	19
6	Théo Arribagé (FRA); Albano Olivetti (FRA) ✓	4,530	30
7	Kevin Krawietz (GER); Tim Pütz (GER) ✓	4,470	17
8	Orlando Luz (BRA); Rafael Matos (BRA) ✓	3,995	30
9	Guido Andreozzi (ARG); Manuel Guinard (FRA)	3,955	25
10	Julian Cash (GBR); Lloyd Glasspool (GBR)	3,820	25

✓ Qualified for the 2026 ATP Finals.
No Qualifiers who withdrew indicated in italics.

== WTA singles ==
WTA rankings (singles) as of 16 November 2026
No.	Player	Points	Move
1	Elena Rybakina (KAZ)	8,099	Steady
2	Mirra Andreeva	7,806	▲1
3	Aryna Sabalenka	6,685	▼1
4	Coco Gauff (USA)	6,163	Steady
5	Jessica Pegula (USA)	6,160	Steady
6	Elina Svitolina (UKR)	5,921	Steady
7	Linda Nosková (CZE)	4,743	▲1
8	Karolína Muchová (CZE)	4,665	▼1
9	Iga Świątek (POL)	4,188	Steady
10	Marta Kostyuk (UKR)	3,910	Steady
11	Diana Shnaider	3,238	Steady
12	Maja Chwalińska (POL)	3,016	Steady
13	Iva Jovic (USA)	2,941	Steady
14	Elise Mertens (BEL)	2,540	Steady
15	Alexandra Eala (PHL)	2,392	Steady
16	Sorana Cîrstea (ROU)	2,386	Steady
17	Naomi Osaka (JPN)	2,315	Steady
18	Leylah Fernandez (CAN)	2,201	Steady
19	Madison Keys (USA)	2,175	Steady
20	Belinda Bencic (SUI)	2,168	Steady

Singles race rankings as of 16 November 2026
No.	Player	Points	Tourn
1	Elena Rybakina (KAZ) No	8,099	20
2	Aryna Sabalenka ✓	6,485	20
3	Mirra Andreeva ✓	6,306	20
4	Coco Gauff (USA) ✓	5,763	20
5	Jessica Pegula (USA) ✓	5,760	20
6	Elina Svitolina (UKR) ✓	5,121	20
7	Karolína Muchová (CZE) ✓	4,665	20
8	Linda Nosková (CZE) ✓	4,343	20
9	Iga Świątek (POL)	4,188	19
10	Marta Kostyuk (UKR) ✓	3,910	20
11	Diana Shnaider ✓	3,238	23
12	Iva Jovic (USA)	2,941	22
13	Maja Chwalińska (POL)	2,755	13
14	Elise Mertens (BEL)	2,540	23
15	Sorana Cîrstea (ROU)	2,386	22
16	Naomi Osaka (JPN)	2,315	20
17	Alexandra Eala (PHL)	2,204	26
18	Leylah Fernandez (CAN)	2,201	27
19	Belinda Bencic (SUI)	2,168	18
20	Victoria Mboko (CAN)	2,143	14

✓ Qualified for the 2026 WTA Finals.
No Qualifiers who withdrew indicated in italics.

== WTA doubles ==
WTA rankings (doubles) as of 16 November 2026
No.	Player	Points	Move
1	Kateřina Siniaková (CZE)	11,960	Steady
2	Taylor Townsend (USA)	9,920	Steady
3	Gabriela Dabrowski (CAN)	8,845	Steady
=	Luisa Stefani (BRA)	8,845	Steady
5	Zhang Shuai (CHN)	6,575	Steady
6	Aleksandra Krunić (SRB)	6,030	Steady
7	Anna Danilina (KAZ)	5,930	Steady
8	Kristina Mladenovic (FRA)	4,960	▲1
9	Sara Errani (ITA)	4,900	▲3
10	Nicole Melichar-Martinez (USA)	4,855	▼2
11	Cristina Bucșa (ESP)	4,405	Steady
12	Elise Mertens (BEL)	4,403	▼2
13	Guo Hanyu (CHN)	4,375	▲1
14	Hsieh Su-wei (TPE)	4,070	▼1
15	Jeļena Ostapenko (LAT)	3,925	Steady
16	Jasmine Paolini (ITA)	3,916	▲9
17	Vera Zvonareva	3,707	▼1
18	Diana Shnaider	3,423	▼1
19	Aldila Sutjiadi (INA)	3,413	▼1
20	Storm Hunter (AUS)	3,335	▼1

Doubles race rankings as of 16 November 2026
No.	Player	Points	Tourn
1	Gabriela Dabrowski (CAN) ✓ Luisa Stefani (BRA)✓	8,495	16
2	Taylor Townsend (USA) ✓ Kateřina Siniaková (CZE) ✓	8,370	9
3	Aleksandra Krunic (SRB) No; Anna Danilina (KAZ) No	5,638	14
4	Kristina Mladenovic (FRA) ✓ Guo Hanyu (CHN) ✓	3,976	12
5	Nicole Melichar-Martinez (USA) ✓ Cristina Bucsa (ESP) ✓	3,740	16
6	Hsieh Su-wei (TPE) ✓ Jelena Ostapenko (LAT) ✓	3,328	9
7	Demi Schuurs (NED) ✓ Ellen Perez (AUS) ✓	3,130	22
8	Zhang Shuai (CHN) ✓ Elise Mertens (BEL) ✓	3,018	9
9	Sara Errani (ITA) ✓ Jasmine Paolini (ITA) ✓	2,917	12
10	Olivia Nicholls (GBR); Tereza Mihalíková (SVK)	2,560	24

✓ Qualified for the 2026 WTA Finals.
No Qualifiers who withdrew indicated in italics.

== See also ==
- ATP rankings
- WTA rankings
- ITF rankings
