= 2026 Alexander Zverev tennis season =

Tennis player season

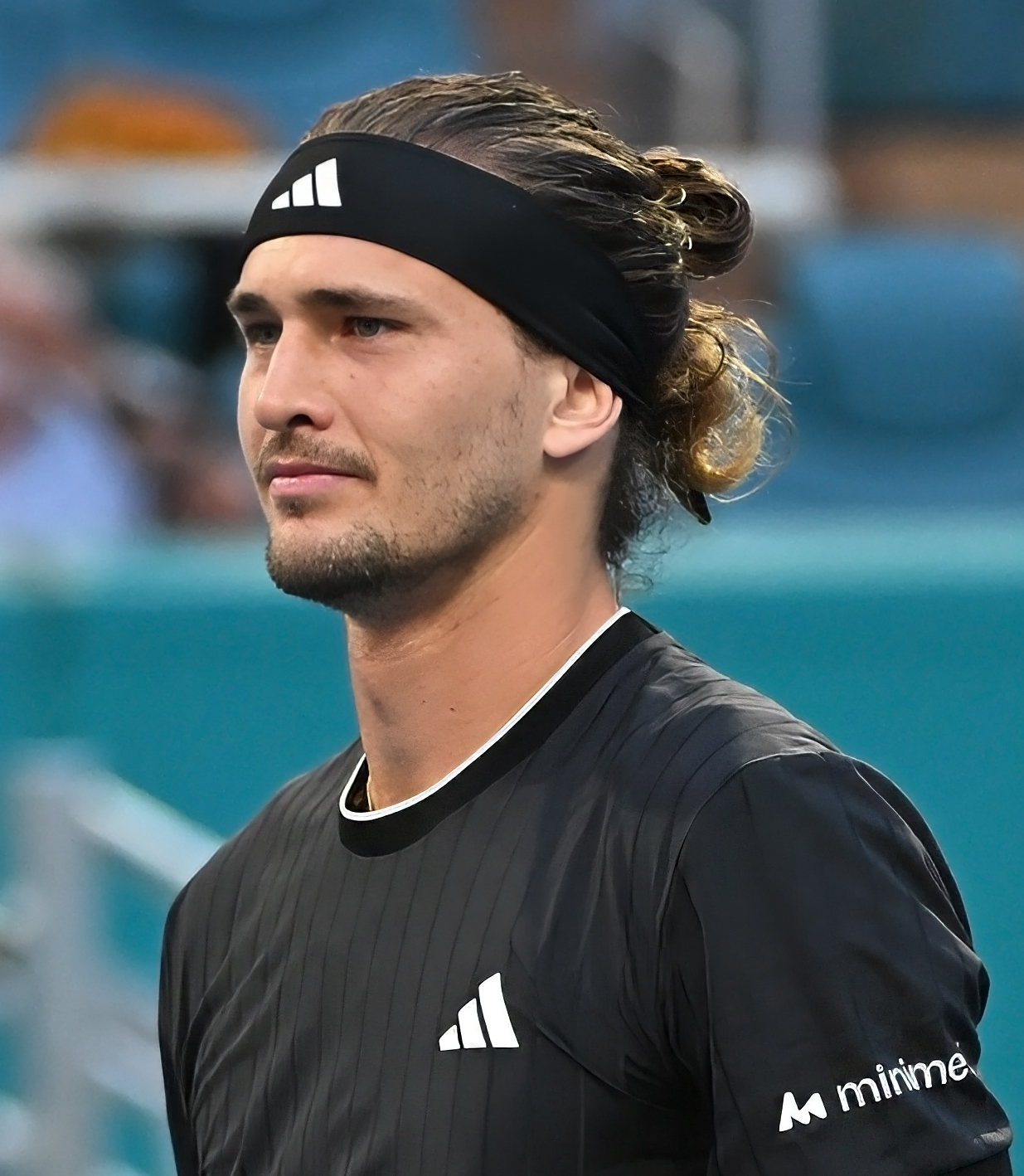
- Zverev in the 2026 Miami Open
- Full name: Alexander Zverev
- Country: Germany
- Calendar prize money: $15,401,939

Singles
- Season record: 69–18 (79.3%)
- Calendar titles: 2
- Current ranking: No. 1
- Ranking change from previous year: ▲2

Grand Slam & significant results
- Australian Open: SF
- French Open: W
- Wimbledon: F
- US Open: W
- Other tournaments

Doubles
- Season record: 9–12 (42.9%)
- Calendar titles: 1
- Current ranking: No.108
- Ranking change from previous year: ▲479

Mixed doubles
- Season record: 0–1 (0%)
- Last updated on: 21 November 2026.

The 2026 Alexander Zverev tennis season, officially began the 2026 tennis season on 4 January 2026, in the first round at the 2026 United Cup venues in Sydney, Australia.

During this season, Zverev:

- Won his first major title at the French Open.
- Won his second major title at the US Open.
- Clinched the world number 1 ranking for a career total of 4 week (as of 23 November 2026).

== Yearly summary ==
=== Early hard court season ===
Zverev opened 2026 at the United Cup (going 1–1 in group play) before reaching his third consecutive Australian Open semifinal, where he rallied from two sets down before falling to top seed Carlos Alcaraz in five sets. Following a second-round singles exit and a doubles title with Marcelo Melo at the Mexican Open, he reached consecutive Masters 1000 semifinals at Indian Wells and Miami, losing both to Jannik Sinner.

=== Clay court season ===
On clay, Zverev reached the semifinals at Monte-Carlo and Munich, and finished runner-up to Sinner at the Madrid Open. Following a fourth-round exit in Rome, he captured his maiden Grand Slam title at the French Open, defeating Flavio Cobolli in five sets.

=== Grass court season ===
Transitioning to grass, Zverev reached his second consecutive major final at Wimbledon, falling to Sinner in four sets.

=== US Open ===
Prior to singles at the US Open, Zverev entered mixed doubles with Taylor Townsend, losing in the first round to Belinda Bencic and Flavio Cobolli. In singles, he survived consecutive five-set battles against Lorenzo Sonego and Quentin Halys before sweeping past Alejandro Tabilo, Luciano Darderi, Botic van de Zandschulp, and Karen Khachanov in straight sets to reach his third major final of the year. He defeated eighth seed Ben Shelton in four sets to claim his second Grand Slam title, then won both of his singles rubbers in Germany's Davis Cup qualifier against Croatia.

=== Laver Cup and Asian swing ===
A week later, Zverev competed for Team Europe at the Laver Cup in London, rebounding from a Day Two singles loss to Alex de Minaur by winning doubles with Casper Ruud and clinching the title on Day Three against Learner Tien. During the Asian swing, he reached the quarterfinals at the China Open (losing to Novak Djokovic) and the semifinals at the Shanghai Masters (losing to Alejandro Davidovich Fokina).

=== Indoor hard court season ===
After reaching the semifinals of the Vienna Open, Zverev ascended to the world No. 1 ranking for the first time on November 2, becoming the first German man since Boris Becker to hold the top spot. Making his debut as world No. 1 at the Paris Masters, he received a first-round bye before losing in straight sets to Lorenzo Musetti in the second round.

== All matches ==
This table chronicles all the matches of Alexander Zverev in 2026.

Key
W	F	SF	QF	#R	RR	Q#	P#	DNQ	A	Z#	PO	G	S	B	NMS	NTI	P	NH

(W) winner; (F) finalist; (SF) semifinalist; (QF) quarterfinalist; (#R) rounds 4, 3, 2, 1; (RR) round-robin stage; (Q#) qualification round; (P#) preliminary round; (DNQ) did not qualify; (A) absent; (Z#) Davis/Fed Cup Zonal Group (with number indication) or (PO) play-off; (G) gold, (S) silver or (B) bronze Olympic/Paralympic medal; (NMS) not a Masters tournament; (NTI) not a Tier I tournament; (P) postponed; (NH) not held; (SR) strike rate (events won / competed); (W–L) win–loss record.
To avoid confusion and double counting, these charts are updated at the conclusion of a tournament or when the player's participation has ended.

=== Singles matches ===
Tournament	Match	Round	Opponent (seed or key)	Rank	Result	Score
United Cup; Sydney, Group F Australia Hard, outdoor 2 – 11 January 2026
United Cup; Sydney, Group F Australia Hard, outdoor 2 – 11 January 2026	1 / 744	RR	(Netherlands) Tallon Griekspoor	25	Win	7–5, 6–0
United Cup; Sydney, Group F Australia Hard, outdoor 2 – 11 January 2026	2 / 745	RR	(Poland) Hubert Hurkacz	83	Loss	3–6, 4–6
Australian Open; Melbourne, Australia; Grand Slam tournament Hard, outdoor 18 January – 1 February 2026
Australian Open; Melbourne, Australia; Grand Slam tournament Hard, outdoor 18 January – 1 February 2026	3 / 746	1R	(Canada) Gabriel Diallo	41	Win	6–7^{(1–7)}, 6–1, 6–4, 6–2
Australian Open; Melbourne, Australia; Grand Slam tournament Hard, outdoor 18 January – 1 February 2026	4 / 747	2R	(France) Alexandre Müller	52	Win	6–3, 4–6, 6–3, 6–4
Australian Open; Melbourne, Australia; Grand Slam tournament Hard, outdoor 18 January – 1 February 2026	5 / 748	3R	(United Kingdom) Cameron Norrie (26)	27	Win	7–5, 4–6, 6–3, 6–1
Australian Open; Melbourne, Australia; Grand Slam tournament Hard, outdoor 18 January – 1 February 2026	6 / 749	4R	(Argentina) Francisco Cerúndolo (18)	21	Win	6–2, 6–4, 6–4
Australian Open; Melbourne, Australia; Grand Slam tournament Hard, outdoor 18 January – 1 February 2026	7 / 750	QF	(United States) Learner Tien (25)	29	Win	6–3, 6–7^{(5–7)}, 6–1, 7–6^{(7–3)}
Australian Open; Melbourne, Australia; Grand Slam tournament Hard, outdoor 18 January – 1 February 2026	8 / 751	SF	(Spain) Carlos Alcaraz (1)	1	Loss	4–6, 6–7^{(5–7)}, 7–6^{(7–3)}, 7–6^{(7–4)}, 5–7
Mexican Open; Acapulco, Mexico; ATP 500; Hard, outdoor 23 – 28 February 2026
Mexican Open; Acapulco, Mexico; ATP 500; Hard, outdoor 23 – 28 February 2026	9 / 752	1R	(France) Corentin Moutet	35	Win	6–2, 6–4
Mexican Open; Acapulco, Mexico; ATP 500; Hard, outdoor 23 – 28 February 2026	10 / 753	2R	(Serbia) Miomir Kecmanović	84	Loss	3–6, 7–6^{(7–3)}, 6–7^{(4–7)}
Indian Wells Open; Indian Wells, United States; ATP 1000; Hard, outdoor 4 – 15 March 2026
Indian Wells Open; Indian Wells, United States; ATP 1000; Hard, outdoor 4 – 15 March 2026	–	1R	Bye			
Indian Wells Open; Indian Wells, United States; ATP 1000; Hard, outdoor 4 – 15 March 2026	11 / 754	2R	(Italy) Matteo Berrettini	66	Win	6–3, 6–4
Indian Wells Open; Indian Wells, United States; ATP 1000; Hard, outdoor 4 – 15 March 2026	12 / 755	3R	(United States) Brandon Nakashima (28)	30	Win	7–6^{(7–2)}, 5–7, 6–4
Indian Wells Open; Indian Wells, United States; ATP 1000; Hard, outdoor 4 – 15 March 2026	13 / 756	4R	(United States) Frances Tiafoe (21)	22	Win	6–3, 6–4
Indian Wells Open; Indian Wells, United States; ATP 1000; Hard, outdoor 4 – 15 March 2026	14 / 757	QF	(France) Arthur Fils (30)	32	Win	6–2, 6–3
Indian Wells Open; Indian Wells, United States; ATP 1000; Hard, outdoor 4 – 15 March 2026	15 / 758	SF	(Italy) Jannik Sinner (2)	2	Loss	2–6, 4–6
Miami Open; Miami Gardens, United States; ATP 1000; Hard, outdoor 18 – 29 March 2026
Miami Open; Miami Gardens, United States; ATP 1000; Hard, outdoor 18 – 29 March 2026	–	1R	Bye			
Miami Open; Miami Gardens, United States; ATP 1000; Hard, outdoor 18 – 29 March 2026	16 / 759	2R	(United States) Martin Damm (WC)	133	Win	6–2, 6–4
Miami Open; Miami Gardens, United States; ATP 1000; Hard, outdoor 18 – 29 March 2026	17 / 760	3R	(Croatia) Marin Čilić	49	Win	6–2, 5–7, 6–4
Miami Open; Miami Gardens, United States; ATP 1000; Hard, outdoor 18 – 29 March 2026	18 / 761	4R	(France) Quentin Halys	111	Win	7–6^{(7–4)}, 7–6^{(7–1)}
Miami Open; Miami Gardens, United States; ATP 1000; Hard, outdoor 18 – 29 March 2026	19 / 762	QF	(Argentina) Francisco Cerúndolo (18)	19	Win	6–1, 6–2
Miami Open; Miami Gardens, United States; ATP 1000; Hard, outdoor 18 – 29 March 2026	20 / 763	SF	(Italy) Jannik Sinner (2)	2	Loss	3–6, 6–7^{(4–7)}
Monte-Carlo Masters; Roquebrune-Cap-Martin, France; ATP 1000; Clay, outdoor 5 – 12 April 2026
Monte-Carlo Masters; Roquebrune-Cap-Martin, France; ATP 1000; Clay, outdoor 5 – 12 April 2026	–	1R	Bye			
Monte-Carlo Masters; Roquebrune-Cap-Martin, France; ATP 1000; Clay, outdoor 5 – 12 April 2026	21 / 764	2R	(Chile) Cristian Garín (Q)	109	Win	4–6, 6–4, 7–5
Monte-Carlo Masters; Roquebrune-Cap-Martin, France; ATP 1000; Clay, outdoor 5 – 12 April 2026	22 / 765	3R	(Belgium) Zizou Bergs	47	Win	6–2, 7–5
Monte-Carlo Masters; Roquebrune-Cap-Martin, France; ATP 1000; Clay, outdoor 5 – 12 April 2026	23 / 766	QF	(Brazil) João Fonseca (6)	40	Win	7–5, 6–7^{(3–7)}, 6–3
Monte-Carlo Masters; Roquebrune-Cap-Martin, France; ATP 1000; Clay, outdoor 5 – 12 April 2026	24 / 767	SF	(Italy) Jannik Sinner (2)	2	Loss	1–6, 4–6
Munich Open; Munich, Germany; ATP 500; Clay, outdoor 13 – 19 April 2026
Munich Open; Munich, Germany; ATP 500; Clay, outdoor 13 – 19 April 2026	25 / 768	1R	(Serbia) Miomir Kecmanović	58	Win	6–3, 3–6, 7–6^{(7–2)}
Munich Open; Munich, Germany; ATP 500; Clay, outdoor 13 – 19 April 2026	26 / 769	2R	(Canada) Gabriel Diallo	37	Win	6–1, 6–2
Munich Open; Munich, Germany; ATP 500; Clay, outdoor 13 – 19 April 2026	27 / 770	QF	(Argentina) Francisco Cerúndolo (5)	19	Win	5–7, 6–0, 6–2
Munich Open; Munich, Germany; ATP 500; Clay, outdoor 13 – 19 April 2026	28 / 771	SF	(Italy) Flavio Cobolli (4)	16	Loss	3–6, 3–6
Madrid Open; Madrid, Spain; ATP 1000; Clay, outdoor 22 April – 3 May 2026
Madrid Open; Madrid, Spain; ATP 1000; Clay, outdoor 22 April – 3 May 2026	–	1R	Bye			
Madrid Open; Madrid, Spain; ATP 1000; Clay, outdoor 22 April – 3 May 2026	29 / 772	2R	(Argentina) Mariano Navone	45	Win	6–1, 3–6, 6–3
Madrid Open; Madrid, Spain; ATP 1000; Clay, outdoor 22 April – 3 May 2026	30 / 773	3R	(France) Térence Atmane	47	Win	6–2, 7–6^{(7–2)}
Madrid Open; Madrid, Spain; ATP 1000; Clay, outdoor 22 April – 3 May 2026	31 / 774	4R	(Czech Republic) Jakub Menšík (23)	27	Win	6–4, 6–7^{(4–7)}, 6–3
Madrid Open; Madrid, Spain; ATP 1000; Clay, outdoor 22 April – 3 May 2026	32 / 775	QF	(Italy) Flavio Cobolli (10)	13	Win	6–1, 6–4
Madrid Open; Madrid, Spain; ATP 1000; Clay, outdoor 22 April – 3 May 2026	33 / 776	SF	(Belgium) Alexander Blockx	69	Win	6–2, 7–5
Madrid Open; Madrid, Spain; ATP 1000; Clay, outdoor 22 April – 3 May 2026	34 / 777	F	(Italy) Jannik Sinner (1)	1	Loss	1–6, 2–6
Italian Open; Rome, Italy; ATP 1000; Clay, outdoor 6 – 17 May 2026
Italian Open; Rome, Italy; ATP 1000; Clay, outdoor 6 – 17 May 2026	–	1R	Bye			
Italian Open; Rome, Italy; ATP 1000; Clay, outdoor 6 – 17 May 2026	35 / 778	2R	(Germany) Daniel Altmaier	64	Win	7–5, 6–3
Italian Open; Rome, Italy; ATP 1000; Clay, outdoor 6 – 17 May 2026	36 / 779	3R	(Belgium) Alexander Blockx	36	Win	6–1, 6–4
Italian Open; Rome, Italy; ATP 1000; Clay, outdoor 6 – 17 May 2026	37 / 780	4R	(Italy) Luciano Darderi (18)	20	Loss	6–1, 6–7^{(10–12)}, 0–6
French Open; Paris, France; Grand Slam tournament Clay, outdoor 24 May – 7 June 2026
French Open; Paris, France; Grand Slam tournament Clay, outdoor 24 May – 7 June 2026	38 / 781	1R	(France) Benjamin Bonzi	95	Win	6–3, 6–4, 6–2
French Open; Paris, France; Grand Slam tournament Clay, outdoor 24 May – 7 June 2026	39 / 782	2R	(Czech Republic) Tomáš Macháč	43	Win	6–4, 6–2, 6–2
French Open; Paris, France; Grand Slam tournament Clay, outdoor 24 May – 7 June 2026	40 / 783	3R	(France) Quentin Halys	90	Win	6–4, 6–3, 5–7, 6–2
French Open; Paris, France; Grand Slam tournament Clay, outdoor 24 May – 7 June 2026	41 / 784	4R	(Netherlands) Jesper de Jong (LL)	106	Win	7–6^{(7–3)}, 6–4, 6–1
French Open; Paris, France; Grand Slam tournament Clay, outdoor 24 May – 7 June 2026	42 / 785	QF	(Spain) Rafael Jódar (27)	29	Win	7–6^{(7–3)}, 6–1, 6–3
French Open; Paris, France; Grand Slam tournament Clay, outdoor 24 May – 7 June 2026	43 / 786	SF	(Czech Republic) Jakub Menšík (26)	27	Win	7–5, 6–2, 3–6, 6–3
French Open; Paris, France; Grand Slam tournament Clay, outdoor 24 May – 7 June 2026	44 / 787	W	(Italy) Flavio Cobolli (10)	14	Win (1)	6–1, 4–6, 6–4, 6–7^{(5–7)}, 6–1
Halle Open; Halle, Germany; ATP 500; Grass, outdoor 15 – 21 June 2026
Halle Open; Halle, Germany; ATP 500; Grass, outdoor 15 – 21 June 2026	45 / 788	1R	(Czech Republic) Vít Kopřiva	64	Win	6–3, 4–6, 6–2
Halle Open; Halle, Germany; ATP 500; Grass, outdoor 15 – 21 June 2026	46 / 789	2R	(Germany) Yannick Hanfmann	59	Win	6–3, 7–6^{(7–4)}
Halle Open; Halle, Germany; ATP 500; Grass, outdoor 15 – 21 June 2026	47 / 790	QF	(Belgium) Raphaël Collignon (Q)	51	Win	7–6^{(12–10)}, 7–6^{(7–2)}
Halle Open; Halle, Germany; ATP 500; Grass, outdoor 15 – 21 June 2026	48 / 791	SF	(United States) Taylor Fritz (5)	9	Loss	7–6^{(7–4)}, 4–6, 5–7
Wimbledon; London, United Kingdom; Grand Slam tournament Grass, outdoor 29 June – 12 July 2026
Wimbledon; London, United Kingdom; Grand Slam tournament Grass, outdoor 29 June – 12 July 2026	49 / 792	1R	(Belgium) Alexander Blockx	36	Win	6–4, 6–7^{(8–10)}, 7–6^{(7–5)}, 7–6^{(7–0)}
Wimbledon; London, United Kingdom; Grand Slam tournament Grass, outdoor 29 June – 12 July 2026	50 / 793	2R	(France) Valentin Royer	75	Win	6–1, 6–3, 7–6^{(7–3)}
Wimbledon; London, United Kingdom; Grand Slam tournament Grass, outdoor 29 June – 12 July 2026	51 / 794	3R	(United States) Marcos Giron	92	Win	6–2, 7–6^{(7–4)}, 6–4
Wimbledon; London, United Kingdom; Grand Slam tournament Grass, outdoor 29 June – 12 July 2026	52 / 795	4R	(Czech Republic) Jiří Lehečka (13)	14	Win	6–4, 7–5, 3–6, 7–6^{(8–6)}
Wimbledon; London, United Kingdom; Grand Slam tournament Grass, outdoor 29 June – 12 July 2026	53 / 796	QF	(United States) Taylor Fritz (6)	7	Win	6–4, 6–4, 6–2
Wimbledon; London, United Kingdom; Grand Slam tournament Grass, outdoor 29 June – 12 July 2026	54 / 797	SF	(United Kingdom) Arthur Fery (WC)	114	Win	7–6^{(7–0)}, 6–2, 6–4
Wimbledon; London, United Kingdom; Grand Slam tournament Grass, outdoor 29 June – 12 July 2026	55 / 798	F	(Italy) Jannik Sinner (1)	1	Loss	7–6^{(9–7)}, 6–7^{(2–7)}, 3–6, 4–6
Canadian Open; Montreal, Canada; ATP 1000; Hard, outdoor 2 – 13 August 2026
Canadian Open; Montreal, Canada; ATP 1000; Hard, outdoor 2 – 13 August 2026	–	1R	Bye			
Canadian Open; Montreal, Canada; ATP 1000; Hard, outdoor 2 – 13 August 2026	56 / 799	2R	(Netherlands) Tallon Griekspoor	69	Loss	7–6^{(7–3)}, 2–6, 4–6
Cincinnati Open; Cincinnati, United States; ATP 1000; Hard, outdoor 13 – 23 August 2026
Cincinnati Open; Cincinnati, United States; ATP 1000; Hard, outdoor 13 – 23 August 2026	–	1R	Bye			
Cincinnati Open; Cincinnati, United States; ATP 1000; Hard, outdoor 13 – 23 August 2026	57 / 800	2R	(United Kingdom) Cameron Norrie	35	Win	3–6, 6–3, 6–3
Cincinnati Open; Cincinnati, United States; ATP 1000; Hard, outdoor 13 – 23 August 2026	58 / 801	3R	(France) Térence Atmane	45	Win	7–6^{(7–4)}, 7–6^{(8–6)}
Cincinnati Open; Cincinnati, United States; ATP 1000; Hard, outdoor 13 – 23 August 2026	59 / 802	4R	(United States) Tommy Paul (18)	24	Loss	6–4, 6–7^{(6–8)}, 4–6
US Open; New York City, United States; Grand Slam tournament Hard, outdoor 30 August – 13 September 2026
US Open; New York City, United States; Grand Slam tournament Hard, outdoor 30 August – 13 September 2026	60 / 803	1R	(Italy) Lorenzo Sonego	89	Win	6–4, 3–6, 6–7^{(7–9)}, 7–5, 6–4
US Open; New York City, United States; Grand Slam tournament Hard, outdoor 30 August – 13 September 2026	61 / 804	2R	(France) Quentin Halys	52	Win	6–4, 4–6, 7–6^{(7–3)}, 6–7^{(3–7)}, 6–3
US Open; New York City, United States; Grand Slam tournament Hard, outdoor 30 August – 13 September 2026	62 / 805	3R	(Chile) Alejandro Tabilo (25)	28	Win	6–2, 7–6^{(7–2)}, 6–2
US Open; New York City, United States; Grand Slam tournament Hard, outdoor 30 August – 13 September 2026	63 / 806	4R	(Italy) Luciano Darderi (21)	22	Win	6–2, 6–2, 7–6^{(7–3)}
US Open; New York City, United States; Grand Slam tournament Hard, outdoor 30 August – 13 September 2026	64 / 807	QF	(Netherlands) Botic van de Zandschulp	70	Win	6–2, 7–5, 6–1
US Open; New York City, United States; Grand Slam tournament Hard, outdoor 30 August – 13 September 2026	65 / 808	SF	(Note: Russian and Belarus players are not allowed to compete under the name or flag of their country following the Russian invasion of Ukraine.) Karen Khachanov	50	Win	6–3, 7–6^{(9–7)}, 7–6^{(8–6)}
US Open; New York City, United States; Grand Slam tournament Hard, outdoor 30 August – 13 September 2026	66 / 809	W	(United States) Ben Shelton (8)	9	Win (2)	6–3, 7–6^{(7–2)}, 5–7, 6–2
Davis Cup Qualifiers; Group stage Halle, Germany; Davis Cup; Hard, indoor 18 – 20 September 2026
Davis Cup Qualifiers; Group stage Halle, Germany; Davis Cup; Hard, indoor 18 – 20 September 2026	67 / 810	RR	(Croatia) Matej Dodig	171	Win	6–4, 7–6^{(7–3)}
Davis Cup Qualifiers; Group stage Halle, Germany; Davis Cup; Hard, indoor 18 – 20 September 2026	68 / 811	RR	(Croatia) Dino Prižmić	103	Win	6–2, 6–4
Laver Cup; London, Great Britain; Laver Cup; Hard, indoor 25 – 27 September 2026
Laver Cup; London, Great Britain; Laver Cup; Hard, indoor 25 – 27 September 2026	69 / 812	Day 2	(Australia) Alex de Minaur	9	Loss	6–2, 6–7^{(5–7)}, [9–11]
Laver Cup; London, Great Britain; Laver Cup; Hard, indoor 25 – 27 September 2026	70 / 813	Day 3	(United States) Learner Tien	13	Win	7–6^{(7–3)}, 6–3
China Open; Beijing, China; ATP 500; Hard, outdoor 30 September – 6 October 2026
China Open; Beijing, China; ATP 500; Hard, outdoor 30 September – 6 October 2026	71 / 814	1R	(United Kingdom) Cameron Norrie	39	Win	7–6^{(7–1)}, 6–4
China Open; Beijing, China; ATP 500; Hard, outdoor 30 September – 6 October 2026	72 / 815	2R	(China) Shang Juncheng (WC)	250	Win	6–0, 6–3
China Open; Beijing, China; ATP 500; Hard, outdoor 30 September – 6 October 2026	73 / 816	QF	(Serbia) Novak Djokovic (6)	11	Loss	6–4, 4–6, 4–6
Shanghai Masters; Shanghai, China; ATP 1000; Hard, outdoor 7 – 18 October 2026
Shanghai Masters; Shanghai, China; ATP 1000; Hard, outdoor 7 – 18 October 2026	–	1R	Bye			
Shanghai Masters; Shanghai, China; ATP 1000; Hard, outdoor 7 – 18 October 2026	74 / 817	2R	(China) Wu Yibing (WC)	113	Win	6–4, 7–6^{(7–4)}
Shanghai Masters; Shanghai, China; ATP 1000; Hard, outdoor 7 – 18 October 2026	75 / 818	3R	(France) Quentin Halys	48	Win	6–4, 6–7^{(8–10)}, 6–3
Shanghai Masters; Shanghai, China; ATP 1000; Hard, outdoor 7 – 18 October 2026	76 / 819	4R	(Kazakhstan) Alexander Bublik (19)	22	Win	7–6^{(8–6)}, 4–6, 7–6^{(7–1)}
Shanghai Masters; Shanghai, China; ATP 1000; Hard, outdoor 7 – 18 October 2026	77 / 820	QF	(Australia) Alex De Minaur (9)	9	Win	6–4, 6–4
Shanghai Masters; Shanghai, China; ATP 1000; Hard, outdoor 7 – 18 October 2026	78 / 821	SF	(Spain) Alejandro Davidovich Fokina (25)	26	Loss	7–5, 4–6, 3–6
Vienna Open; Vienna, Austria; ATP 500; Hard, indoor 26 October – 1 November 2026
Vienna Open; Vienna, Austria; ATP 500; Hard, indoor 26 October – 1 November 2026	79 / 822	1R	(Spain) Martín Landaluce (WC)	67	Win	7–5, 3–6, 7–6^{(13–11)}
Vienna Open; Vienna, Austria; ATP 500; Hard, indoor 26 October – 1 November 2026	80 / 823	2R	(Netherlands) Tallon Griekspoor	50	Win	6–4, 7–5
Vienna Open; Vienna, Austria; ATP 500; Hard, indoor 26 October – 1 November 2026	81 / 824	QF	(United Kingdom) Arthur Fery	35	Win	6–0, 6–2
Vienna Open; Vienna, Austria; ATP 500; Hard, indoor 26 October – 1 November 2026	82 / 825	SF	(Australia) Alex De Minaur (5)	10	Loss	4–6, 6–1, 6–7^{(4–7)}
Paris Masters; Paris, France; ATP 1000; Hard, outdoor 2–8 November 2026
Paris Masters; Paris, France; ATP 1000; Hard, outdoor 2–8 November 2026	–	1R	Bye			
Paris Masters; Paris, France; ATP 1000; Hard, outdoor 2–8 November 2026	83 / 826	2R	(Italy) Lorenzo Musetti	24	Loss	6–7^{(5–7)}, 2–6
ATP Finals; Turin, Italy; ATP Finals; Hard, indoor 15–22 November 2026
ATP Finals; Turin, Italy; ATP Finals; Hard, indoor 15–22 November 2026	84 / 827	RR	(Spain) Rafael Jódar (8)	10	Win	6–4, 6–4
ATP Finals; Turin, Italy; ATP Finals; Hard, indoor 15–22 November 2026	85 / 828	RR	(United States) Ben Shelton (3)	4	Win	6–2, 7–6^{(7–4)}
ATP Finals; Turin, Italy; ATP Finals; Hard, indoor 15–22 November 2026	86 / 829	RR	(France) Arthur Fils (6)	7	Win	6–4, 7–6^{(8–6)}
ATP Finals; Turin, Italy; ATP Finals; Hard, indoor 15–22 November 2026	87 / 830	SF	Daniil Medvedev (4)	5	Win	7–6^{(7–0)}, 6–4
ATP Finals; Turin, Italy; ATP Finals; Hard, indoor 15–22 November 2026	88 / 831	F	(Spain) Carlos Alcaraz (2)	3	Loss	2–6, 6–7^{(7–9)}
Davis Cup Finals; Finals; Bologna, Italy; Davis Cup; Hard, indoor 24 – 29 November 2026
Davis Cup Finals; Finals; Bologna, Italy; Davis Cup; Hard, indoor 24 – 29 November 2026	89 / 832	QF	TBD			

=== Doubles matches ===
Tournament	Match	Round	Opponent (seed or key)	Rank	Result	Score
Mexican Open; Acapulco, Mexico; ATP 500; Hard, outdoor 23–28 February 2026; Partner: (Brazil) Marcelo Melo
Mexican Open; Acapulco, Mexico; ATP 500; Hard, outdoor 23–28 February 2026; Partner: (Brazil) Marcelo Melo	1 / 160	1R	(Mexico) Santiago González / (Netherlands) David Pel	50 / 29	Win	6–4, 3–6, [10–4]
Mexican Open; Acapulco, Mexico; ATP 500; Hard, outdoor 23–28 February 2026; Partner: (Brazil) Marcelo Melo	2 / 161	QF	(Portugal) Nuno Borges / (Mexico) Miguel Ángel Reyes-Varela	167 / 80	Win	6–3, 3–6, [10–4]
Mexican Open; Acapulco, Mexico; ATP 500; Hard, outdoor 23–28 February 2026; Partner: (Brazil) Marcelo Melo	3 / 162	SF	(Spain) Rafael Jódar / (Mexico) Rodrigo Pacheco Méndez (WC)	– / 182	Win	6–3, 7–5
Mexican Open; Acapulco, Mexico; ATP 500; Hard, outdoor 23–28 February 2026; Partner: (Brazil) Marcelo Melo	4 / 163	W	(Austria) Alexander Erler / (United States) Robert Galloway	39 / 55	Win (1)	6–3, 6–4
Indian Wells Open; Indian Wells, United States; ATP 1000; Hard, outdoor 4–15 March 2026; Partner: (Brazil) Marcelo Melo
Indian Wells Open; Indian Wells, United States; ATP 1000; Hard, outdoor 4–15 March 2026; Partner: (Brazil) Marcelo Melo	5 / 164	1R	(Canada) Félix Auger-Aliassime / (United States) Sebastian Korda	348 / 102	Loss	7–6^{(8–6)}, 2–6, [5–10]
Miami Open; Miami Gardens, United States; ATP 1000; Hard, outdoor 18–29 March 2026; Partner: (Brazil) Marcelo Melo
Miami Open; Miami Gardens, United States; ATP 1000; Hard, outdoor 18–29 March 2026; Partner: (Brazil) Marcelo Melo	6 / 165	1R	(United States) Evan King / (Australia) John Peers	28 / 61	Loss	6–4, 6–7^{(5–7)}, [4–10]
Monte-Carlo Masters; Roquebrune-Cap-Martin, France; ATP 1000; Clay, outdoor 5–12 April 2026; Partner: (Brazil) Marcelo Melo
Monte-Carlo Masters; Roquebrune-Cap-Martin, France; ATP 1000; Clay, outdoor 5–12 April 2026; Partner: (Brazil) Marcelo Melo	7 / 166	1R	(United Kingdom) Luke Johnson / (Poland) Jan Zieliński	28 / 33	Win	6–3, 6–3
Monte-Carlo Masters; Roquebrune-Cap-Martin, France; ATP 1000; Clay, outdoor 5–12 April 2026; Partner: (Brazil) Marcelo Melo	8 / 167	2R	(Spain) Marcel Granollers / (Argentina) Horacio Zeballos (1)	3 / 2	Loss	6–7^{(5–7)}, 1–6
Munich Open; Munich, Germany; ATP 500; Clay, outdoor 13–19 April 2026; Partner: (Brazil) Marcelo Melo
Munich Open; Munich, Germany; ATP 500; Clay, outdoor 13–19 April 2026; Partner: (Brazil) Marcelo Melo	9 / 168	1R	(France) Sadio Doumbia / (France) Fabien Reboul (2)	22 / 23	Loss	3–6, 3–6
Madrid Open; Madrid, Spain; ATP 1000; Clay, outdoor 22 April – 3 May 2026; Partner: (Brazil) Marcelo Melo
Madrid Open; Madrid, Spain; ATP 1000; Clay, outdoor 22 April – 3 May 2026; Partner: (Brazil) Marcelo Melo	10 / 169	1R	(Italy) Luciano Darderi / (Greece) Stefanos Tsitsipas	202 / 354	Loss	5–7, 4–6
Italian Open; Rome, Italy; ATP 1000; Clay, outdoor 6–17 May 2026; Partner: (Brazil) Marcelo Melo
Italian Open; Rome, Italy; ATP 1000; Clay, outdoor 6–17 May 2026; Partner: (Brazil) Marcelo Melo	11 / 170	1R	(El Salvador) Marcelo Arévalo / (Croatia) Mate Pavić (5)	9 / 9	Loss	4–6, 3–6
Halle Open; Halle, Germany; ATP 500; Grass, outdoor 15–21 June 2026; Partner: (Brazil) Marcelo Melo
Halle Open; Halle, Germany; ATP 500; Grass, outdoor 15–21 June 2026; Partner: (Brazil) Marcelo Melo	12 / 171	1R	(Belgium) Zizou Bergs / (Kazakhstan) Alexander Bublik	408 / 374	Win	6–4, 6–7^{(4–7)}, [10–5]
Halle Open; Halle, Germany; ATP 500; Grass, outdoor 15–21 June 2026; Partner: (Brazil) Marcelo Melo	13 / 172	2R	(Italy) Flavio Cobolli / (United States) Ben Shelton	591 / 126	Loss	6–7^{(5–7)}, 3–6
Canadian Open; Montreal, Canada; ATP 1000; Hard, outdoor 2–13 August 2026; Partner: (Brazil) Marcelo Melo
Canadian Open; Montreal, Canada; ATP 1000; Hard, outdoor 2–13 August 2026; Partner: (Brazil) Marcelo Melo	14 / 173	1R	(Canada) Duncan Chan / (Canada) Alexis Galarneau (WC)	1115 / –	Loss	3–6, 6–7^{(5–7)}
Cincinnati Open; Cincinnati, United States; ATP 1000; Hard, outdoor 13–23 August 2026; Partner: (Brazil) Marcelo Melo
Cincinnati Open; Cincinnati, United States; ATP 1000; Hard, outdoor 13–23 August 2026; Partner: (Brazil) Marcelo Melo	15 / 174	1R	(Argentina) Mariano Navone / (Chile) Alejandro Tabilo (Alt)	– / 215	Win	7–6^{(7–4)}, 6–3
Cincinnati Open; Cincinnati, United States; ATP 1000; Hard, outdoor 13–23 August 2026; Partner: (Brazil) Marcelo Melo	16 / 175	2R	(Brazil) Orlando Luz / (Brazil) Rafael Matos	22 / 20	Loss	6–7^{(4–7)}, 3–6
Laver Cup; London, Great Britain; Laver Cup; Hard, indoor 25 – 27 September 2026; Partner: (Norway) Casper Ruud
Laver Cup; London, Great Britain; Laver Cup; Hard, indoor 25 – 27 September 2026; Partner: (Norway) Casper Ruud	17 / 176	Day 2	(Kazakhstan) Alexander Bublik / (United States) Brandon Nakashima	359 / 497	Win	6–4, 7–6^{(9–7)}
China Open; Beijing, China; ATP 500; Hard, outdoor 30 September – 6 October 2026; Partner: (Brazil) Marcelo Melo
China Open; Beijing, China; ATP 500; Hard, outdoor 30 September – 6 October 2026; Partner: (Brazil) Marcelo Melo	18 / 177	1R	(Germany) Constantin Frantzen / (Netherlands) Robin Haase	41 / 43	Win	6–2, 7–5
China Open; Beijing, China; ATP 500; Hard, outdoor 30 September – 6 October 2026; Partner: (Brazil) Marcelo Melo	19 / 178	QF	(United Kingdom) Julian Cash / (United Kingdom) Lloyd Glasspool (2)	15 / 15	Loss	2–6, 4–6
Shanghai Masters; Shanghai, China; ATP 1000; Hard, outdoor 7 – 18 October 2026; Partner: (Brazil) Marcelo Melo
Shanghai Masters; Shanghai, China; ATP 1000; Hard, outdoor 7 – 18 October 2026; Partner: (Brazil) Marcelo Melo	20 / 179	1R	(Netherlands) Sander Arends / (United Kingdom) Luke Johnson (Alt)	44 / 46	Loss	7–6^{(7–5)}, 7–6^{(7–5)}
Vienna Open; Vienna, Austria; ATP 500; Hard, indoor 26 October – 1 November 2026; Partner: (Brazil) Marcelo Melo
Vienna Open; Vienna, Austria; ATP 500; Hard, indoor 26 October – 1 November 2026; Partner: (Brazil) Marcelo Melo	21 / 180	1R	(Italy) Simone Bolelli / (Italy) Andrea Vavassori (4)	10 / 7	Loss	6–7^{(6–8)}, 2–6
Paris Masters; Paris, France; ATP 1000; Hard, outdoor 2–8 November 2026; Partner: (Brazil) Marcelo Melo
Paris Masters; Paris, France; ATP 1000; Hard, outdoor 2–8 November 2026; Partner: (Brazil) Marcelo Melo	Withdrew					

=== Mixed doubles matches ===
Tournament	Match	Round	Opponent (seed or key)	Rank	Result	Score
United Cup; Sydney, Group F Australia Hard, outdoor 2–11 January 2026; Partner: (Germany) Laura Siegemund
United Cup; Sydney, Group F Australia Hard, outdoor 2–11 January 2026; Partner: (Germany) Laura Siegemund	1 / 0	RR	(Netherlands) Demi Schuurs / (Netherlands) Tallon Griekspoor	20 / 134	Win	6–3, 6–2
United Cup; Sydney, Group F Australia Hard, outdoor 2–11 January 2026; Partner: (Germany) Laura Siegemund	2 / 0	RR	(Poland) Katarzyna Kawa / (Poland) Jan Zieliński	509 / 33	Loss	6–7^{(6–8)}, 3–6
US Open; New York City, United States; Grand Slam tournament Hard, outdoor 30 August – 13 September 2026; Partner: (United States) Taylor Townsend
US Open; New York City, United States; Grand Slam tournament Hard, outdoor 30 August – 13 September 2026; Partner: (United States) Taylor Townsend	3 / 3	1R	(Switzerland) Belinda Bencic / (Italy) Flavio Cobolli (4)	1636 / 364	Loss	2–4, 2–4

== Exhibition matches ==
=== Singles ===
Tournament	Match	Round	Opponent (seed or key)	Rank	Result	Score
Australian Open Opening Week; Melbourne, Australia Hard, outdoor 13 January 2026
Australian Open Opening Week; Melbourne, Australia Hard, outdoor 13 January 2026	1	PO	(Italy) Lorenzo Musetti	5	Win	7–6^{(9–7)}, 0–0, Ret.
6 Kings Slam; Riyadh, Saudi Arabia Hard, outdoor 27 – 30 December 2026
6 Kings Slam; Riyadh, Saudi Arabia Hard, outdoor 27 – 30 December 2026	2	QF	(United States) Taylor Fritz	9		

== Schedule ==
Per Alexander Zverev, this is his current 2026 schedule (subject to change).

=== Singles schedule ===
Date	Tournament	Location	Tier	Surface	Prev. result	Prev. points	New points	Result
2 January 2026– 11 January 2026	United Cup	Perth/Sydney (AUS)	United Cup	Hard	RR	55	40	Round Robin ( Germany defeated the Netherlands, 3–0); Round Robin ( Germany lost to Poland, 0–3)
18 January 2026– 1 February 2026	Australian Open	Melbourne (AUS)	Grand Slam	Hard	F	1300	800	Semifinals (lost to Carlos Alcaraz, 4–6, 6–7^{(5–7)}, 7–6^{(7–3)}, 7–6^{(7–4)}, 5–7)
9 February 2026– 15 February 2026	Argentina Open	Buenos Aires (ARG)	ATP 250	Clay	QF	50	0	Withdrew
16 February 2026– 22 February 2026	Brazil Open	Rio de Janeiro (BRA)	ATP 500	Clay	QF	100	0	Withdrew
23 February 2026– 28 February 2026	Mexico Open	Acapulco (MEX)	ATP 500	Clay	2R	50	50	Second Round (lost to Miomir Kecmanović, 3–6, 7–6^{(7–3)}, 6–7^{(4–7)})
4 March 2026– 15 March 2026	Indian Wells Open	Indian Wells (USA)	ATP 1000	Hard	2R	10	400	Semifinals (lost to Jannik Sinner, 2–6, 4–6)
18 March 2026– 29 March 2026	Miami Open	Miami (USA)	ATP 1000	Hard	4R	100	400	Semifinals (lost to Jannik Sinner, 3–6, 6–7^{(4–7)})
5 April 2026– 12 April 2026	Monte-Carlo Masters	Roquebrune-Cap-Martin (FRA)	ATP 1000	Clay	2R	10	400	Semifinals (lost to Jannik Sinner, 1–6, 4–6)
13 April 2026– 19 April 2026	Munich Open	Munich (GER)	ATP 500	Clay	W	500	200	Semifinals (lost to Flavio Cobolli, 3–6, 3–6)
22 April 2026– 3 May 2026	Madrid Open	Madrid (ESP)	ATP 1000	Clay	4R	100	650	Final (lost to Jannik Sinner, 1–6, 2–6)
6 May 2026– 17 May 2026	Italian Open	Rome (ITA)	ATP 1000	Clay	QF	200	100	Fourth Round (lost to Luciano Darderi, 6–1, 6–7^{(10–12)}, 0–6)
19 May 2026– 25 May 2026	Hamburg Open	Hamburg (GER)	ATP 500	Clay	2R	50	0	Withdrew
24 May 2026– 7 June 2026	French Open	Paris (FRA)	Grand Slam	Clay	QF	400	2000	Champion (defeated Flavio Cobolli, 6–1, 4–6, 6–4, 6–7^{(5–7)}, 6–1)
8 June 2026– 14 June 2026	Stuttgart Open	Stuttgart (GER)	ATP 250	Grass	F	165	0	Withdrew
15 June 2026– 21 June 2026	Halle Open	Halle (GER)	ATP 500	Grass	SF	200	200	Semifinals (lost to Taylor Fritz, 7–6^{(7–4)}, 4–6, 5–7)
29 June 2026– 12 July 2026	Wimbledon	London (GBR)	Grand Slam	Grass	1R	10	1300	Final (lost to Jannik Sinner, 7–6^{(9–7)}, 6–7^{(2–7)}, 3–6, 4–6)
2 August 2026– 13 August 2026	Canadian Open	Montreal (CAN)	ATP 1000	Hard	SF	400	10	Second Round (lost to Tallon Griekspoor, 7–6^{(7–3)}, 2–6, 4–6)
13 August 2026– 23 August 2026	Cincinnati Open	Cincinnati (USA)	ATP 1000	Hard	SF	400	100	Fourth Round (lost to Tommy Paul, 6–4, 6–7^{(6–8)}, 4–6)
30 August 2026– 13 September 2026	US Open	New York (USA)	Grand Slam	Hard	3R	100	2000	Champion (defeated Ben Shelton, 6–3, 7–6^{(7–2)}, 5–7, 6–2)
18 September 2026– 20 September 2026	Davis Cup Qualifiers	Halle (GER)	Davis Cup	Hard (i)	N/A	N/A	N/A	Round Robin ( Germany defeated the Croatia, 3–1)
25 September 2026– 27 September 2026	Laver Cup	London, Great Britain	Laver Cup	Hard (i)	N/A	N/A	N/A	Team Europe defeated Team World, 13–5
30 September 2026– 6 October 2026	China Open	Beijing (CHN)	ATP 500	Hard	QF	100	100	Quarterfinals (lost to Novak Djokovic, 6–4, 4–6, 4–6)
7 October 2026– 18 October 2026	Shanghai Masters	Shanghai (CHN)	ATP 1000	Hard	3R	50	400	Semifinals (lost to Alejandro Davidovich Fokina, 7–5, 4–6, 3–6)
26 October 2026– 1 November 2026	Vienna Open	Vienna (AUT)	ATP 500	Hard (i)	F	330	200	Semifinals (lost to Alex de Minaur, 4–6, 6–1, 6–7^{(4–7)})
2 November 2026– 8 November 2026	Paris Masters	Paris (FRA)	ATP 1000	Hard (i)	SF	400	10	Second Round (lost to Lorenzo Musetti, 6–7^{(5–7)}, 2–6)
15 November 2026– 22 November 2026	ATP Finals	Turin (ITA)	Tour Finals	Hard (i)	RR	200		
24 November 2026– 29 November 2026	Davis Cup Finals	Bologna (ITA)	Davis Cup	Hard (i)	N/A	N/A	N/A	
Total year-end points (as of Paris Masters)						5080	9360	
Total year-end points						5280	9560	▲4280 difference
Source: Rankings breakdown

== Yearly records ==
=== Head-to-head matchups ===
Alexander Zverev has a 67–18 (78.8%) ATP match win–loss record in the 2026 season. His record against players ranked in the ATP rankings Top 10 at the time of the meeting is 5–9 (35.7%). Bold indicates player was ranked top 10 at the time of at least one meeting. The following list is ordered by number of wins:

- (France) Quentin Halys 4–0
- (Belgium) Alexander Blockx 3–0
- (Argentina) Francisco Cerúndolo 3–0
- (United Kingdom) Cameron Norrie 3–0
- (France) Térence Atmane 2–0
- (Canada) Gabriel Diallo 2–0
- (United Kingdom) Arthur Fery 2–0
- (Spain) **Rafael Jódar** 2–0
- (Czech Republic) Jakub Menšík 2–0
- (United States) **Ben Shelton** 2–0
- (United States) Learner Tien 2–0
- (Italy) Flavio Cobolli 2–1
- (Netherlands) Tallon Griekspoor 2–1
- (Germany) Daniel Altmaier 1–0
- (Italy) Matteo Berrettini 1–0
- (Belgium) Zizou Bergs 1–0
- (France) Benjamin Bonzi 1–0
- (Croatia) Marin Čilić 1–0
- (Belgium) Raphaël Collignon 1–0
- (United States) Martin Damm 1–0
- (Croatia) Matej Dodig 1–0
- (Netherlands) Jesper de Jong 1–0
- (France) Arthur Fils 1–0
- (Brazil) João Fonseca 1–0
- (Chile) Cristian Garín 1–0
- (United States) Marcos Giron 1–0
- (Germany) Yannick Hanfmann 1–0
- (China) Shang Juncheng 1–0
- Karen Khachanov 1–0
- (Czech Republic) Vít Kopřiva 1–0
- (Spain) Martín Landaluce 1–0
- (Czech Republic) Jiří Lehečka 1–0
- (Czech Republic) Tomáš Macháč 1–0
- (France) Corentin Moutet 1–0
- (France) Alexandre Müller 1–0
- (United States) Brandon Nakashima 1–0
- (Argentina) Mariano Navone 1–0
- (Croatia) Dino Prižmić 1–0
- (France) Valentin Royer 1–0
- (Italy) Lorenzo Sonego 1–0
- (Chile) Alejandro Tabilo 1–0
- (United States) Frances Tiafoe 1–0
- (China) Wu Yibing 1–0
- (Netherlands) Botic van de Zandschulp 1–0
- (Kazakhstan) Alexander Bublik 1–0
- (Italy) Luciano Darderi 1–1
- (United States) **Taylor Fritz** 1–1
- (Serbia) Miomir Kecmanović 1–1
- (Australia) **Alex de Minaur** 1–2
- (Spain) **Carlos Alcaraz** 0–1
- (Serbia) Novak Djokovic 0–1
- (Spain) Alejandro Davidovich Fokina 0–1
- (Poland) Hubert Hurkacz 0–1
- (Italy) Lorenzo Musetti 0–1
- (United States) Tommy Paul 0–1
- (Italy) **Jannik Sinner** 0–5

* Statistics correct as of 17 November 2026.

=== Top 10 record (7–9) ===
Category Grand Slam (2–2) ATP Finals (4–0) Laver Cup (0–1) Masters 1000 (1–4) 500 Series (0–2) 250 Series (0–0)	Wins by surface Hard (6–5) Clay (0–2) Grass (1–2)	Wins by setting Outdoor (3–7) Indoor (4–2)

Result	W–L	Player	Rk	Event	Surface	Rd	Score	Rk	Ref
Loss	0–1	(Spain) Carlos Alcaraz	**1**	Australian Open, Australia	Hard	SF	4–6, 6–7^{(5–7)}, 7–6^{(7–3)}, 7–6^{(7–4)}, 5–7	3	
Loss	0–2	(Italy) Jannik Sinner	2	Indian Wells Open, United States	Hard	SF	2–6, 4–6	4	
Loss	0–3	(Italy) Jannik Sinner	2	Miami Open, United States	Hard	SF	3–6, 6–7^{(4–7)}	4	
Loss	0–4	(Italy) Jannik Sinner	2	Monte-Carlo Masters, France	Clay	SF	1–6, 4–6	3	
Loss	0–5	(Italy) Jannik Sinner	**1**	Madrid Open, Spain	Clay	F	1–6, 2–6	3	
Loss	0–6	(United States) Taylor Fritz	9	Halle Open, Germany	Grass	SF	7–6^{(7–4)}, 4–6, 5–7	3	
Win	1–6	(United States) Taylor Fritz	7	Wimbledon, United Kingdom	Grass	QF	6–4, 6–4, 6–2	3	
Loss	1–7	(Italy) Jannik Sinner	**1**	Wimbledon, United Kingdom	Grass	F	7–6^{(9–7)}, 6–7^{(2–7)}, 3–6, 4–6	3	
Win	2–7	(United States) Ben Shelton	9	US Open, United States	Hard	F	6–3, 7–6^{(7–2)}, 5–7, 6–2	2	
Loss	2–8	(Australia) Alex de Minaur	5	Laver Cup, United Kingdom	Hard (i)	RR	6–2, 6–7^{(5–7)}, [9–11]	2	
Win	3–8	(Australia) Alex de Minaur	9	Shanghai Masters, China	Hard	QF	6–4, 6–4	2	
Loss	3–9	(Australia) Alex de Minaur	10	Vienna Open, Austria	Hard (i)	SF	4–6, 6–1, 6–7^{(4–7)}	2	
Win	4–9	(Spain) Rafael Jódar	10	ATP Finals, Italy	Hard (i)	RR	6–4, 6–4	**1**	
Win	5–9	(United States) Ben Shelton	4	ATP Finals, Italy	Hard (i)	RR	6–2, 7–6^{(7–4)}	**1**	
Win	6–9	(France) Arthur Fils	7	ATP Finals, Italy	Hard (i)	RR	6–4, 7–6^{(8–6)}	**1**	
Win	7–9	Daniil Medvedev	5	ATP Finals, Italy	Hard (i)	SF	7–6^{(7–0)}, 6–4	**1**	
Pending		(Spain) Carlos Alcaraz	3	ATP Finals, Italy	Hard (i)	F	2–6	**1**	

- Key: (Rk) first use, opponent rank; (Rd) round; (Rk) 2nd use, player rank; (Ref) reference; (F) final; (SF) semifinal; (QF) quarterfinal; (#R) rounds 4, 3, 2, 1; (RR) round-robin stage; (Q#) qualifying rounds or stages (3), 2, 1.

=== Finals ===
==== Singles: 5 (2 titles, 2 runner-up, 1 pending) ====
Category Grand Slam (2–1) ATP Finals (0–0) ATP 1000 (0–1) ATP 500 (0–0) ATP 250 (0–0)	Titles by surface Hard (1–0) Clay (1–1) Grass (0–1)	Titles by setting Outdoor (2–2) Indoor (0–0)

Result	W–L	Date	Tournament	Tier	Surface	Opponent	Score
Loss	0–1	May 2026	Madrid Open, Spain	Masters 1000	Clay	(Italy) Jannik Sinner	1–6, 2–6
Win	1–1	Jun 2026	French Open, France	Grand Slam	Clay	(Italy) Flavio Cobolli	6–1, 4–6, 6–4, 6–7^{(5–7)}, 6–1
Loss	1–2	Jul 2026	Wimbledon, United Kingdom	Grand Slam	Grass	(Italy) Jannik Sinner	7–6^{(9–7)}, 6–7^{(2–7)}, 3–6, 4–6
Win	2–2	Sep 2026	US Open, United States	Grand Slam	Hard	(United States) Ben Shelton	6–3, 7–6^{(7–2)}, 5–7, 6–2
Pending	–	Nov 2026	ATP Finals, Italy	ATP Finals	Hard (i)	(Spain) Carlos Alcaraz	

=== Earnings ===
- **Bold** font denotes tournament win

**Singles**
Event	Prize money	Year-to-date
United Cup	$309,500	$309,500
Australian Open	A$1,250,000	$1,144,375
Mexican Open	$36,115	$1,180,490
Indian Wells Open	$340,190	$1,520,680
Miami Open	$340,190	$1,860,870
Monte-Carlo Masters	€290,960	$2,195,968
Munich Open	€137,340	$2,356,876
Madrid Open	€535,585	$2,986,724
Italian Open	€92,470	$3,095,117
**French Open**	**€2,800,000**	$6,344,797
Halle Open	€138,530	$6,505,077
Wimbledon Championships	£1,800,000	$8,878,300
Canadian Open	$36,110	$8,914,410
Cincinnati Open	$105,720	$9,020,130
**US Open**	**$5,500,000**	$14,520,130
China Open	$112,035	$14,632,165
Shanghai Masters	$340,190	$14,972,355
Vienna Open	€150,040	$15,140,445
Paris Masters	€45,520	$15,191,223
ATP Finals	$	$
Bonus Pool ATP Ranking		
		$15,191,223
**Doubles**
Event	Prize money	Year-to-date
**Mexican Open**	**$75,845**	$75,845
Indian Wells Open	$9,755	$85,600
Miami Open	$9,755	$95,355
Monte-Carlo Masters	€13,525	$110,931
Munich Open	€5,495	$117,369
Madrid Open	€8,530	$127,400
Italian Open	€8,530	$137,399
Halle Open	€10,710	$149,684
Canadian Open	$9,755	$159,439
Cincinnati Open	$17,850	$177,289
China Open	$16,950	$194,239
Shanghai Masters	$9,755	$203,994
Vienna Open	€6,000	$210,716
		$210,716
**Total**
		**$15,401,939**

Figures in United States dollars (USD) unless noted.

- source：2026 Singles Activity
- source：2026 Doubles Activity

== See also ==
- 2026 ATP Tour
- 2026 Novak Djokovic tennis season
- 2026 Jannik Sinner tennis season
- 2026 Carlos Alcaraz tennis season
