= 2026 Abierto Mexicano Telcel – Doubles =

Doubles
- 2026 Abierto Mexicano Telcel

Final
- Champions: (Brazil) Marcelo Melo (Germany) Alexander Zverev
- Runners-up: (Austria) Alexander Erler (United States) Robert Galloway
- Score: 6–3, 6–4

Events
Singles	Doubles
- Mexican Open

Marcelo Melo and Alexander Zverev defeated Alexander Erler and Robert Galloway in the final, 6–3, 6–4 to win the doubles tennis title at the 2026 Mexican Open. It was Melo's 42nd ATP Tour-level doubles title (and second successive title, after winning in Rio de Janeiro the week prior), and Zverev's third. This was their first title as a team.

Christian Harrison and Evan King were the reigning champions, but chose not to compete together. Harrison partnered Neal Skupski, but lost in the first round to Guido Andreozzi and Manuel Guinard. King partnered John Peers, but lost in the first round to Sadio Doumbia and Fabien Reboul.

== Seeds ==
1. (United States) Christian Harrison / (United Kingdom) Neal Skupski (first round)
2. (Monaco) Hugo Nys / (France) Édouard Roger-Vasselin (first round)
3. (France) Sadio Doumbia / (France) Fabien Reboul (quarterfinals)
4. (United Kingdom) Luke Johnson / (Poland) Jan Zieliński (first round)

== Draw ==
Key

- Q = Qualifier
- WC = Wild card
- LL = Lucky loser
- Alt = Alternate
- ITF = ITF entry
- PR = Protected ranking
- SR = Special ranking
- SE = Special exempt
- JE = Junior exempt
- JR = Junior Accelerator Programme entrant
- CO = College Accelerator Programme entrant
- NG = Next Gen Accelerator Program entrant
- w/o = Walkover
- r = Retired
- d = Defaulted

=== Draw ===
First round
1	(United States) C Harrison (United Kingdom) N Skupski	6^{3}	6^{6}
(Argentina) G Andreozzi (France) M Guinard	7^{7}	7^{8}
(United States) R Cash (United States) JJ Tracy	6^{5}	7	[6]
Q	(United States) V Kirkov (Netherlands) B Stevens	7^{7}	5	[10]
3	(France) S Doumbia (France) F Reboul	6	7^{7}
(United States) E King (Australia) J Peers	2	6^{4}
(Germany) C Frantzen (Netherlands) R Haase	6	0	[7]
(Austria) A Erler (United States) R Galloway	4	6	[10]
WC	(Spain) R Jódar (Mexico) R Pacheco Méndez	3	6	[10]
(United States) A Krajicek (Croatia) N Mektić	6	3	[6]
(Italy) F Cobolli (Bulgaria) G Dimitrov	7^{8}	2	[10]
4	(United Kingdom) L Johnson (Poland) J Zieliński	6^{6}	6	[8]
(Brazil) M Melo (Germany) A Zverev	6	3	[10]
(Mexico) S González (Netherlands) D Pel	4	6	[4]
WC	(Portugal) N Borges (Mexico) MÁ Reyes-Varela	6	6
2	(Monaco) H Nys (France) É Roger-Vasselin	3	3

Quarterfinals
(Argentina) G Andreozzi (France) M Guinard	1	0
Q	(United States) V Kirkov (Netherlands) B Stevens	6	6
3	(France) S Doumbia (France) F Reboul	6^{3}	4
(Austria) A Erler (United States) R Galloway	7^{7}	6
WC	(Spain) R Jódar (Mexico) R Pacheco Méndez	w/o
(Italy) F Cobolli (Bulgaria) G Dimitrov
(Brazil) M Melo (Germany) A Zverev	6	3	[10]
WC	(Portugal) N Borges (Mexico) MÁ Reyes-Varela	3	6	[4]

Semifinals
Q	(United States) V Kirkov (Netherlands) B Stevens	3	2
(Austria) A Erler (United States) R Galloway	6	6
WC	(Spain) R Jódar (Mexico) R Pacheco Méndez	3	5
(Brazil) M Melo (Germany) A Zverev	6	7

Final
(Austria) A Erler (United States) R Galloway	3	4
(Brazil) M Melo (Germany) A Zverev	6	6

== Qualifying ==
=== Seeds ===
1. (United States) Vasil Kirkov / (Netherlands) Bart Stevens (qualified)
2. (Australia) Rinky Hijikata / (Australia) Adam Walton (qualifying competition)

=== Qualifiers ===
1. (United States) Vasil Kirkov / (Netherlands) Bart Stevens

=== Qualifying draw ===
First round
1	(United States) Vasil Kirkov (Netherlands) Bart Stevens	6	2	[10]
WC	(Mexico) Alex Hernández (Mexico) Alan Magadán	2	6	[1]
(Venezuela) Juan José Bianchi (United States) Pranav Kumar	3	5
2	(Australia) Rinky Hijikata (Australia) Adam Walton	6	7

Qualifying competition
1	(United States) Vasil Kirkov (Netherlands) Bart Stevens	4	6	[11]
2	(Australia) Rinky Hijikata (Australia) Adam Walton	6	3	[9]
