= 2026 Erste Bank Open =

Men's tennis tournament in Austria

- Date: 26 October–1 November
- Edition: 52nd
- Category: ATP 500 tournaments
- Draw: 32S / 16D
- Surface: Hard (indoor)
- Location: Vienna, Austria
- Venue: Wiener Stadthalle

Champions

Singles
- (Spain) Carlos Alcaraz

Doubles
- (Austria) Lucas Miedler / (Austria) Neil Oberleitner
- Vienna Open

The 2026 Erste Bank Open was a men's tennis tournament to be played on indoor hard courts. It was the 52nd edition of the event, and part of the ATP 500 tournaments of the 2026 ATP Tour. It took place at the Wiener Stadthalle in Vienna, Austria, from 26 October to 1 November 2026.

== Champions ==
=== Singles ===
- (Spain) Carlos Alcaraz def. (Australia) Alex de Minaur, 6–1, 6–4

=== Doubles ===
- (Austria) Lucas Miedler / (Austria) Neil Oberleitner def. (United States) Ryan Seggerman / (United States) Learner Tien, 6–1, 7–5

== Points and prize money ==
=== Point distribution ===
Event	W	F	SF	QF	Round of 16	Round of 32	Q	Q2	Q1
Singles	500	330	200	100	50	0	25	13	0
Doubles	500	300	180	90	0	—N/a			

=== Prize money ===
Event	W	F	SF	QF	Round of 16	Round of 32	Q2	Q1
Singles	€523,305	€281,540	€150,040	€76,655	€40,920	€21,820	€11,185	€6,275
Doubles*	€171,870	€91,660	€46,370	€23,200	€12,000	—N/a	—N/a	—N/a

_{*per team}

== Singles main-draw entrants ==
=== Seeds ===
Country	Player	Rank^{1}	Seed
GER	Alexander Zverev	2	1
ESP	Carlos Alcaraz	3	2
	Daniil Medvedev	5	3
ITA	Flavio Cobolli	6	4
AUS	Alex de Minaur	8	5
USA	Frances Tiafoe	9	6
USA	Tommy Paul	14	7
CZE	Jakub Menšík	16	8

- ^{1} Rankings as of 19 October 2026

=== Other entrants ===
The following players received wildcards into the singles main draw:

- (Spain) Carlos Alcaraz
- (Bulgaria) Grigor Dimitrov
- (Spain) Martín Landaluce
- (Austria) Jurij Rodionov

The following player received entry as a special exempt:

- (Georgia (country)) Nikoloz Basilashvili

The following players received entry from the qualifying draw:

- (United Kingdom) Jacob Fearnley
- (Czech Republic) Tomáš Macháč
- (France) Adrian Mannarino
- (Austria) Lukas Neumayer

=== Withdrawals ===
- (Belgium) Alexander Blockx → replaced by (Italy) Matteo Berrettini
- (Italy) Jannik Sinner → replaced by (France) Luca Van Assche

== Doubles main draw entrants ==
=== Seeds ===
Country	Player	Country	Player	Rank^{1}	Seed
FIN	Harri Heliövaara	GBR	Henry Patten	2	1
USA	Christian Harrison	GBR	Neal Skupski	9	2
ESA	Marcelo Arévalo	CRO	Mate Pavić	17	3
ITA	Simone Bolelli	ITA	Andrea Vavassori	17	4

- ^{1} Rankings as of 19 October 2026

=== Other entrants ===
The following pairs received wildcards into the doubles main draw:

- (United States) Robert Cash / (Austria) Alexander Erler
- (Austria) Lukas Neumayer / (Austria) Jurij Rodionov

The following pair received entry from the qualifying draw:

- (Argentina) Máximo González / (Argentina) Andrés Molteni
