= 2026 Abierto Mexicano Telcel – Singles =

Singles
- 2026 Abierto Mexicano Telcel

Final
- Champion: (Italy) Flavio Cobolli
- Runner-up: (United States) Frances Tiafoe
- Score: 7–6^{(7–4)}, 6–4

Details
- Draw: 32 (4 Q / 3 WC )
- Seeds: 8

Events
| Singles | Doubles |
- Mexican Open

Flavio Cobolli defeated Frances Tiafoe in the final, 7–6^{(7–4)}, 6–4 to win the singles tennis title at the 2026 Mexican Open. It was his third ATP Tour title, and first on hardcourts. Cobolli was the first Italian to win the title.

Tomáš Macháč was the reigning champion, but chose to enter the tournament in Dubai, from which he then withdrew due to injury.

== Seeds ==
1. (Germany) Alexander Zverev (second round)
2. (Australia) Alex de Minaur (first round)
3. (Norway) Casper Ruud (first round)
4. (Spain) Alejandro Davidovich Fokina (second round)
5. (Italy) Flavio Cobolli (champion)
6. (Monaco) Valentin Vacherot (quarterfinals)
7. (United Kingdom) Cameron Norrie (first round)
8. (United States) Frances Tiafoe (final)

== Draw ==
Key

- Q = Qualifier
- WC = Wild card
- LL = Lucky loser
- Alt = Alternate
- ITF = ITF entry
- PR = Protected ranking
- SR = Special ranking
- SE = Special exempt
- JE = Junior exempt
- JR = Junior Accelerator Programme entrant
- CO = College Accelerator Programme entrant
- NG = Next Gen Accelerator Program entrant
- w/o = Walkover
- r = Retired
- d = Defaulted

=== Finals ===
Semifinals
(Serbia) Miomir Kecmanović | 6^{5} | 6 | 4
5 | (Italy) Flavio Cobolli | 7^{7} | 3 | 6
8 | (United States) Frances Tiafoe | 3 | 7^{8} | 6
(United States) Brandon Nakashima | 6 | 6^{6} | 4

Final
5 | (Italy) Flavio Cobolli | 7^{7} | 6
8 | (United States) Frances Tiafoe | 6^{4} | 4

=== Top half ===
First round
1 | (Germany) A Zverev | 6 | 6
(France) C Moutet | 2 | 4
(Australia) T Schoolkate | 2 | 2
(Serbia) M Kecmanović | 6 | 6
(France) T Atmane | 6 | 6
(Bulgaria) G Dimitrov | 3 | 3
WC | (Spain) R Jódar | 6 | 6
7 | (United Kingdom) C Norrie | 3 | 2
3 | (Norway) C Ruud | 6^{2} | 6^{1}
Q | (China) Y Wu | 7^{7} | 7^{7}
(France) A Mannarino | 3 | 4
Q | (Japan) S Shimabukuro | 6 | 6
(Australia) J Duckworth | 4 | 1
(Czech Republic) D Svrčina | 6 | 6
WC | (Mexico) R Pacheco Méndez | 6^{3} | 6^{3}
5 | (Italy) F Cobolli | 7^{7} | 7^{7}

Second round
1 | (Germany) A Zverev | 3 | 7^{7} | 6^{4}
(Serbia) M Kecmanović | 6 | 6^{3} | 7^{7}
(France) T Atmane | 6 | 4 | 6
WC | (Spain) R Jódar | 2 | 6 | 1
Q | (China) Y Wu | 6 | 7^{7}
Q | (Japan) S Shimabukuro | 3 | 6^{4}
(Czech Republic) D Svrčina | 4 | 4
5 | (Italy) F Cobolli | 6 | 6

Quarterfinals
(Serbia) M Kecmanović | 6 | 6
(France) T Atmane | 3 | 3
Q | (China) Y Wu | 6^{4} | 1
5 | (Italy) F Cobolli | 7^{7} | 6

Semifinals
(Serbia) M Kecmanović | 6^{5} | 6 | 4
5 | (Italy) F Cobolli | 7^{7} | 3 | 6

=== Bottom half ===
First round
8 | (United States) F Tiafoe | 6 | 6
(Portugal) N Borges | 4 | 4
(Australia) A Walton | 6^{1} | 6^{3}
(United States) A Kovacevic | 7^{7} | 7^{7}
LL | (Australia) R Hijikata | 6^{5} | 3
(Italy) M Bellucci | 7^{7} | 6
(Germany) D Altmaier | 5 | 3
4 | (Spain) A Davidovich Fokina | 7 | 6
6 | (Monaco) V Vacherot | 4 | 6 | 6
LL | (Hong Kong) C Wong | 6 | 3 | 2
(Bosnia and Herzegovina) D Džumhur | 4 | 6^{5}
WC | (France) G Monfils | 6 | 7^{7}
(United States) B Nakashima | 6 | 6
Q | (Sweden) E Ymer | 3 | 4
Q | (United States) P Kypson | 6 | 6^{4} | 7^{7}
2 | (Australia) A de Minaur | 1 | 7^{7} | 6^{4}

Second round
8 | (United States) F Tiafoe | 6 | 3 | 7^{9}
(United States) A Kovacevic | 4 | 6 | 6^{7}
(Italy) M Bellucci | 6 | 6
4 | (Spain) A Davidovich Fokina | 3 | 3
6 | (Monaco) V Vacherot | 6 | 6
WC | (France) G Monfils | 3 | 3
(United States) B Nakashima | 6 | 6
Q | (United States) P Kypson | 4 | 4

Quarterfinals
8 | (United States) F Tiafoe | 6 | 6
(Italy) M Bellucci | 3 | 4
6 | (Monaco) V Vacherot | 6 | 2 | 3
(United States) B Nakashima | 2 | 6 | 6

Semifinals
8 | (United States) F Tiafoe | 3 | 7^{8} | 6
(United States) B Nakashima | 6 | 6^{6} | 4

== Qualifying ==
=== Seeds ===
1. (United States) Patrick Kypson (qualified)
2. (United States) Zachary Svajda (qualifying competition, retired)
3. (Australia) Rinky Hijikata (qualifying competition, lucky loser)
4. (United States) Mackenzie McDonald (first round)
5. (Japan) Sho Shimabukuro (qualified)
6. (Hong Kong) Coleman Wong (qualifying competition, lucky loser)
7. (China) Wu Yibing (qualified)
8. (Colombia) Nicolás Mejía (qualifying competition)

=== Qualifiers ===
1. (United States) Patrick Kypson
2. (Japan) Sho Shimabukuro
3. (China) Wu Yibing
4. (Sweden) Elias Ymer

=== Lucky losers ===
1. (Australia) Rinky Hijikata
2. (Hong Kong) Coleman Wong

=== Qualifying draw ===
==== First qualifier ====
First round
1 | (United States) Patrick Kypson | 7^{7} | 6
Alt | (United States) Stefan Kozlov | 6^{3} | 0
WC | (Mexico) Alex Hernández | 3 | 2
6 | (Hong Kong) Coleman Wong | 6 | 6

Qualifying competition
1 | (United States) Patrick Kypson | 6 | 6
6 | (Hong Kong) Coleman Wong | 3 | 0

==== Second qualifier ====
First round
2 | (United States) Zachary Svajda | 6 | 6
Alt | (United States) Andres Martin | 0 | 0
WC | (Mexico) Rafael de Alba | 2 | 2
5 | (Japan) Sho Shimabukuro | 6 | 6

Qualifying competition
2 | (United States) Zachary Svajda | 1^{r}
5 | (Japan) Sho Shimabukuro | 5

==== Third qualifier ====
First round
3 | (Australia) Rinky Hijikata | 7^{7} | 6
WC | (Mexico) Alan Magadán | 6^{0} | 3
(Argentina) Juan Pablo Ficovich | 0 | 2
7 | (China) Wu Yibing | 6 | 6

Qualifying competition
3 | (Australia) Rinky Hijikata | 1 | 6^{3}
7 | (China) Wu Yibing | 6 | 7^{7}

==== Fourth qualifier ====
First round
4 | (United States) Mackenzie McDonald | 6^{7} | 6 | 4
(Sweden) Elias Ymer | 7^{9} | 4 | 6
(Australia) Bernard Tomic | 3 | 0^{r}
8 | (Colombia) Nicolás Mejía | 6 | 3

Qualifying competition
(Sweden) Elias Ymer | 6 | 6
8 | (Colombia) Nicolás Mejía | 4 | 4
