= 2026 Erste Bank Open – Singles =

2026 tennis tournament in Austria

Singles
- 2026 Erste Bank Open

Final
- Champion: (Spain) Carlos Alcaraz
- Runner-up: (Australia) Alex de Minaur
- Score: 6–1, 6–4
- Date: 1 November 2026

Details
- Draw: 32 (4 Q / 4 WC )
- Seeds: 8

Events
Singles	Doubles
- Erste Bank Open

Carlos Alcaraz defeated Alex de Minaur in the final, 6–1, 6–4 to win the singles tennis title at the 2026 Vienna Open. He did not lose a set en route to his 28th career ATP Tour singles title.

Jannik Sinner was the reigning champion, but withdrew before the tournament due to a knee injury. Alexander Zverev attained the world No. 1 ranking for the first time in his career by reaching the quarterfinals.

== Seeds ==
1. (Germany) Alexander Zverev (semifinals)
2. (Spain) Carlos Alcaraz (champion)
3. Daniil Medvedev (semifinals)
4. (Italy) Flavio Cobolli (second round, retired)
5. (Australia) Alex de Minaur (final)
6. (United States) Frances Tiafoe (first round)
7. (United States) Tommy Paul (quarterfinals)
8. (Czech Republic) Jakub Menšík (second round)

== Draw ==
Key

- Q = Qualifier
- WC = Wild card
- LL = Lucky loser
- Alt = Alternate
- ITF = ITF entry
- PR = Protected ranking
- SR = Special ranking
- SE = Special exempt
- JE = Junior exempt
- JR = Junior Accelerator Programme entrant
- CO = College Accelerator Programme entrant
- NG = Next Gen Accelerator Program entrant
- w/o = Walkover
- r = Retired
- d = Defaulted

=== Finals ===
Semifinals
1	(Germany) Alexander Zverev	4	6	6^{4}
5	(Australia) Alex de Minaur	6	1	7^{7}
3	Daniil Medvedev	4	6^{2}
2/WC	(Spain) Carlos Alcaraz	6	7^{7}

Final
5	(Australia) Alex de Minaur	1	4
2/WC	(Spain) Carlos Alcaraz	6	6

=== Top half ===
First round
1	(Germany) A Zverev	7	3	7^{13}
WC	(Spain) M Landaluce	5	6	6^{11}
(Netherlands) T Griekspoor	6	4	7^{7}
(United States) B Nakashima	1	6	6^{2}
(United Kingdom) A Fery	5
Q	(United Kingdom) J Fearnley	1^{r}
(Italy) L Musetti	7^{8}	7
6	(United States) F Tiafoe	6^{6}	5
4	(Italy) F Cobolli	6	3	6
WC	(Bulgaria) G Dimitrov	4	6	3
(Italy) M Berrettini	6	6
(Argentina) TM Etcheverry	3	4
(France) L Van Assche	3	1
(United States) L Tien	6	6
Q	(Czech Republic) T Macháč	6	4	3
5	(Australia) A de Minaur	1	6	6

Second round
1	(Germany) A Zverev	6	7
(Netherlands) T Griekspoor	4	5
(United Kingdom) A Fery	6	5	6
(Italy) L Musetti	4	7	4
4	(Italy) F Cobolli	2^{r}
(Italy) M Berrettini	5
(United States) L Tien	4	2
5	(Australia) A de Minaur	6	6

Quarterfinals
1	(Germany) A Zverev	6	6
(United Kingdom) A Fery	0	2
(Italy) M Berrettini	6^{4}	2
5	(Australia) A de Minaur	7^{7}	6

Semifinals
1	(Germany) A Zverev	4	6	6^{4}
5	(Australia) A de Minaur	6	1	7^{7}

=== Bottom half ===
First round
8	(Czech Republic) J Menšík	6	6
Q	(Austria) L Neumayer	2	2
Q	(France) A Mannarino	0	7	6
(Peru) I Buse	6	5	4
(United Kingdom) C Norrie	6	6
(Argentina) F Cerúndolo	4	1
(Spain) D Mérida	6^{5}	1
3	D Medvedev	7^{7}	6
7	(United States) T Paul	7	6
A Rublev	5	2
(Italy) L Darderi	7	6
(Italy) M Arnaldi	5	2
WC	(Austria) J Rodionov	6^{3}	1
SE	(Georgia (country)) N Basilashvili	7^{7}	6
K Khachanov	4	6^{5}
2/WC	(Spain) C Alcaraz	6	7^{7}

Second round
8	(Czech Republic) J Menšík	4	5
Q	(France) A Mannarino	6	7
(United Kingdom) C Norrie	6	3	6^{1}
3	D Medvedev	4	6	7^{7}
7	(United States) T Paul	6	6
(Italy) L Darderi	1	1
SE	(Georgia (country)) N Basilashvili	1	6^{11}
2/WC	(Spain) C Alcaraz	6	7^{13}

Quarterfinals
Q	(France) A Mannarino	2	3
3	D Medvedev	6	6
7	(United States) T Paul	4	6^{2}
2/WC	(Spain) C Alcaraz	6	7^{7}

Semifinals
3	D Medvedev	4	6^{2}
2/WC	(Spain) C Alcaraz	6	7^{7}

== Qualifying ==
=== Seeds ===
1. (Argentina) Thiago Agustín Tirante (first round)
2. (Paraguay) Adolfo Daniel Vallejo (first round)
3. (Hungary) Fábián Marozsán (qualifying competition, withdrew)
4. (Czech Republic) Vít Kopřiva (first round)
5. (France) Titouan Droguet (qualifying competition)
6. (Czech Republic) Tomáš Macháč (qualified)
7. (Spain) Pablo Carreño Busta (first round)
8. (Serbia) Hamad Medjedovic (first round)

=== Qualifiers ===
1. (France) Adrian Mannarino
2. (United Kingdom) Jacob Fearnley
3. (Czech Republic) Tomáš Macháč
4. (Austria) Lukas Neumayer

=== Qualifying draw ===
==== First qualifier ====
First round
1	(Argentina) Thiago Agustín Tirante	4	6^{5}
(France) Adrian Mannarino	6	7^{7}
(Slovakia) Alex Molčan	6	6
8	(Serbia) Hamad Medjedovic	2	4

Qualifying competition
(France) Adrian Mannarino	7	6
(Slovakia) Alex Molčan	5	2

==== Second qualifier ====
First round
2	(Paraguay) Adolfo Daniel Vallejo	2	6	3
(Italy) Lorenzo Sonego	6	3	6
(United Kingdom) Jacob Fearnley	6	3	6
7	(Spain) Pablo Carreño Busta	4	6	3

Qualifying competition
(Italy) Lorenzo Sonego	1	7^{7}	4
(United Kingdom) Jacob Fearnley	6	6^{3}	6

==== Third qualifier ====
First round
3	(Hungary) Fábián Marozsán	3	6	6
WC	(Austria) Sebastian Sorger	6	4	4
(France) Corentin Moutet	4	4
6	(Czech Republic) Tomáš Macháč	6	6

Qualifying competition
3	(Hungary) Fábián Marozsán
6	(Czech Republic) Tomáš Macháč	w/o

==== Fourth qualifier ====
First round
4	(Czech Republic) Vít Kopřiva	4	3
WC	(Austria) Lukas Neumayer	6	6
WC	(Austria) Joel Schwärzler	3	6	5
5	(France) Titouan Droguet	6	3	7

Qualifying competition
WC	(Austria) Lukas Neumayer	7^{7}	6
5	(France) Titouan Droguet	6^{3}	3
