= United Cup =

International tennis tournament

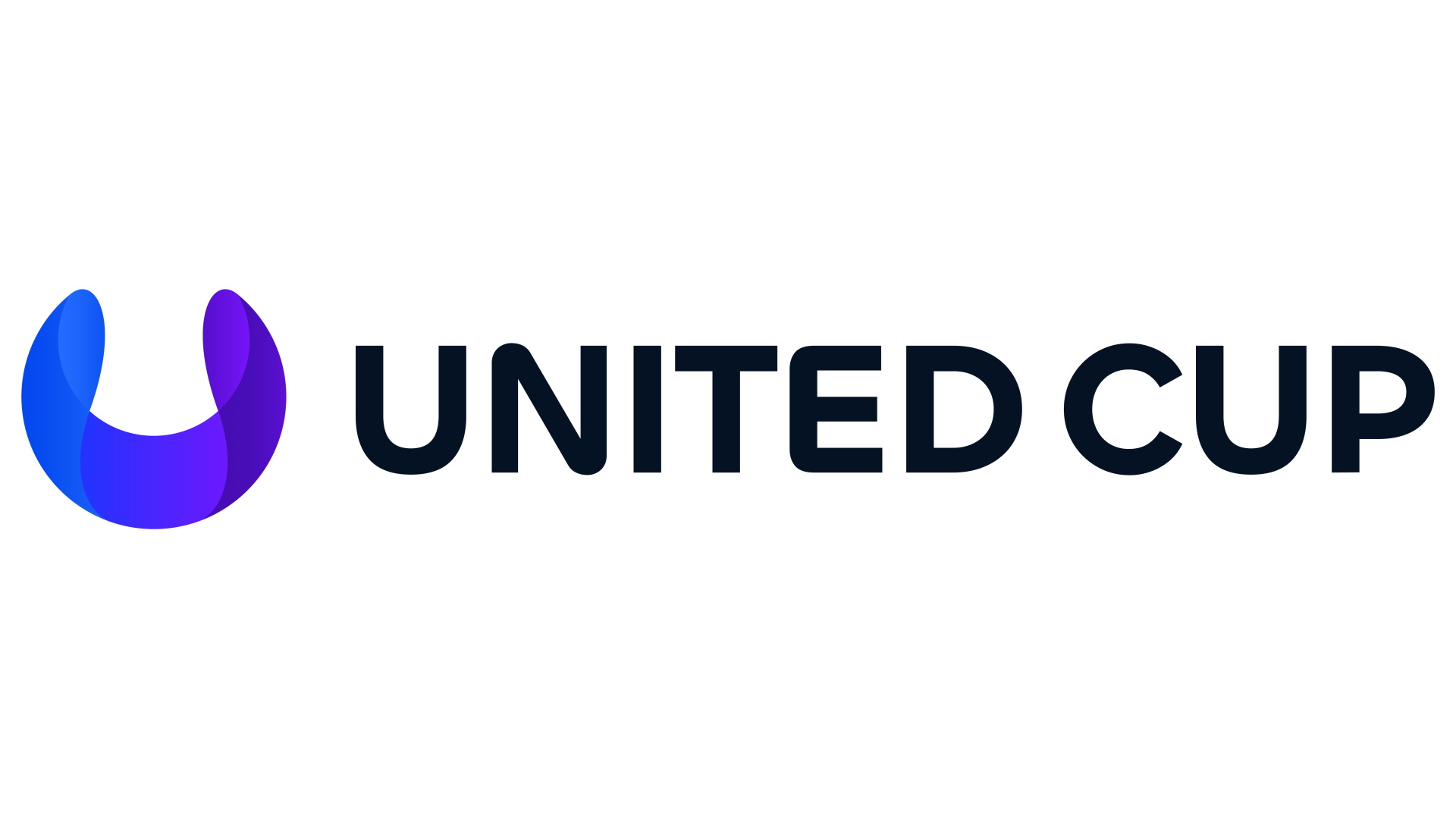

Tournament information
- Founded: December 2022
- Editions: 4
- Location: Brisbane, Perth, Sydney; Australia
- Surface: Hard / outdoors
- Draw: 18 teams
- Prize money: US$11,806,190 (2026)
- Current champion: Poland (1st title)
- Website: UnitedCup.com

The United Cup is an international hard court tennis competition featuring mixed-gender teams from 18 countries. The first event was held in December 2022 into January 2023. The event is played across multiple Australian cities over 11 days in the leadup to the Australian Open.

== History ==
The tournament was announced on 7 August 2022 as a replacement for the ATP Cup, a men's team tournament that had been established in 2020 by the ATP and Tennis Australia. While offering large purses, the tournament had been hampered by low attendance and the impact of the COVID-19 pandemic. The new competition was seen as more akin to the Hopman Cup tournament formerly played in Perth from 1989 to 2019.

It is the first mixed-gender team event to offer both ATP rankings and WTA rankings points to its players, with a maximum 500 points for the winners.

== Trophy ==
The United Cup trophy was designed and made by London-based Thomas Lyte. Crafted from sterling silver and plated 24-carat gold, it was first unveiled at Cottesloe Beach in Perth, Western Australia, in December 2022.

Standing at 50 cm tall, the United Cup features 36 sweeping rods to represent the 18-country mixed doubles partnerships involved in the tournament.

== Tournament ==
=== Format ===
The first week of the international team competition features a group phase, with six groups of three countries, which play each other in a round robin format. One group in each city plays all its ties in the morning sessions while the other plays in the evening sessions.

In the 2023 edition, the group winners in each city play off in a city final for one of three semifinal spots. This city final is played in one day across a morning and an evening session. Of the three losing teams, one with the best record up to that point becomes the fourth semifinalist. For the 2024 edition, the six group winners along with the two best runners-up of each host city advanced to the quarterfinals.

There is a travel day allocated before the semifinals and final take place in Sydney.

In the 2023 edition, the final took place on one day. In case the tie's winner is decided after the singles matches, the mixed doubles match would not be played.

In the 2023 edition, each tie consisted of five matches, with two men's singles matches, two women's singles matches, and a mixed doubles match. For the 2024 edition, each tie consists of three matches (men's singles, women's singles and mixed doubles).

In the 2023 edition, each tie was split into two sessions played in different days, with two matches in the first day and three matches in the second day- In the 2024 edition, the three matches are held in the same day.

=== Qualification ===
18 countries qualify as follows:

- five countries based on the ATP ranking of their No. 1 ranked singles player
- five countries based on the WTA ranking of their No. 1 ranked singles player
- the final eight countries based on the combined ranking of their number one ranked ATP and WTA players.

In exchange for being the host nation, Australia is guaranteed one of the spots reserved for teams with the best combined ranking if it fails to qualify on its own.

In the 2023 edition, each country had three singles specialists and a doubles specialist for each gender. In the 2024 edition, each country has two singles specialists and a doubles specialist for each gender.

== Venues ==
Image	Name	Opened	Capacity	Location	Events	Map
	Pat Rafter Arena	2009	5,500	Brisbane	2023	United Cup is located in Australia
	RAC Arena	2012	15,500	Perth	2023–present	United Cup is located in Australia
	Ken Rosewall Arena	1999	10,500	Sydney	2023–present	United Cup is located in Australia

== Finals ==
Year	Champions	Runners-up	Score
2023	United States	Italy	4–0
2024	Germany	Poland	2–1
2025	United States (2)	Poland	2–0
2026	Poland	Switzerland	2–1

== Results by nation ==
Country	2023		2024		2025		2026		Overall		
Country	Rnd	W–L	Rnd	W–L	Rnd	W–L	Rnd	W–L	App	W–L	Win %
Argentina	RR	0–2	–	–	RR	1–1	QF	1–2	3	2–5	29%
Australia	RR	1–1	SF	2–2	RR	1–1	QF	2–1	4	6–5	55%
Belgium	RR	0–2	–	–	–	–	SF	2–2	2	2–4	33%
Brazil	RR	1–1	RR	0–2	RR	0–2	–	–	3	1–5	17%
Bulgaria	RR	1–1	–	–	–	–	–	–	1	1–1	50%
Canada	–	–	RR	1–1	RR	1–1	RR	1–1	3	3–3	50%
Chile	–	–	RR	1–1	–	–	–	–	1	1–1	50%
China	–	–	QF	1–2	QF	1–2	RR	1–1	3	3–5	38%
Croatia	HF	2–1	RR	1–1	RR	0–2	–	–	3	3–4	43%
Czech Republic	RR	1–1	RR	0–2	SF	2–2	QF	1–2	4	4–7	36%
France	RR	1–1	SF	3–1	RR	0–2	RR	0–2	4	4–6	40%
Germany	RR	0–2	W	4–1	QF	2–1	RR	1–1	4	7–5	58%
Great Britain	HF	2–1	RR	1–1	QF	1–2	RR	1–1	4	5–5	50%
Greece	SF	3–1	QF	1–2	RR	1–1	QF	2–1	4	7–5	58%
Italy	F	3–2	RR	0–2	QF	2–1	RR	1–1	4	6–6	50%
Japan	–	–	–	–	–	–	RR	0–2	1	0–2	0%
Kazakhstan	RR	0–2	–	–	SF	3–1	–	–	2	3–3	50%
Netherlands	–	–	RR	1–1	–	–	RR	0–2	2	1–3	25%
Norway	RR	0–2	QF	1–2	RR	0–2	RR	0–2	4	1–8	11%
Poland	SF	3–1	F	4–1	F	4–1	W	5–0	4	16–3	84%
Serbia	–	–	QF	2–1	–	–	–	–	1	2–1	67%
Spain	RR	0–2	RR	1–1	RR	0–2	RR	0–2	4	1–7	13%
Switzerland	RR	1–1	–	–	RR	1–1	F	4–1	3	6–3	67%
United States	W	5–0	RR	1–1	W	5–0	SF	3–1	4	14–2	88%

- RR Round-robin, HF Host city finalists, QF Quarterfinalists, SF Semifinalists, F Finalists, W Winners

== See also ==
- ATP Cup
- Billie Jean King Cup
- Davis Cup
- Hopman Cup
