= 2026 Erste Bank Open – Doubles =

2025 tennis tournament in Austria

Doubles
- 2026 Erste Bank Open

Final
- Champions: (Austria) Lucas Miedler (Austria) Neil Oberleitner
- Runners-up: (United States) Ryan Seggerman (United States) Learner Tien
- Score: 6–1, 7–5

Details
- Draw: 16
- Seeds: 4

Events
Singles	Doubles
- Erste Bank Open

Lucas Miedler and Neil Oberleitner defeated Ryan Seggerman and Learner Tien in the final, 6–1, 7–5 to win the doubles tennis title at the 2026 Vienna Open. Miedler was the third player to win three titles at the tournament, after Bob Hewitt and Łukasz Kubot.

Julian Cash and Lloyd Glasspool were the reigning champions, but they chose to compete in Basel instead.

== Seeds ==
1. (Finland) Harri Heliövaara / (United Kingdom) Henry Patten (quarterfinals)
2. (United States) Christian Harrison / (United Kingdom) Neal Skupski (quarterfinals)
3. (El Salvador) Marcelo Arévalo / (Croatia) Mate Pavić (first round)
4. (Italy) Simone Bolelli / (Italy) Andrea Vavassori (quarterfinals)

== Draw ==
Key

- Q = Qualifier
- WC = Wild card
- LL = Lucky loser
- Alt = Alternate
- ITF = ITF entry
- PR = Protected ranking
- SR = Special ranking
- SE = Special exempt
- JE = Junior exempt
- JR = Junior Accelerator Programme entrant
- CO = College Accelerator Programme entrant
- NG = Next Gen Accelerator Program entrant
- w/o = Walkover
- r = Retired
- d = Defaulted

=== Draw ===
First round
1	(Finland) H Heliövaara (United Kingdom) H Patten	6^{4}	6	[10]
(United States) A Krajicek (Croatia) N Mektić	7^{7}	2	[8]
(Austria) L Miedler (Austria) N Oberleitner	6	4	[10]
PR	(Czech Republic) P Nouza (New Zealand) M Venus	4	6	[8]
4	(Italy) S Bolelli (Italy) A Vavassori	7^{8}	6
(Brazil) M Melo (Germany) A Zverev	6^{6}	2
WC	(United States) R Cash (Austria) A Erler	4	2
(Argentina) G Andreozzi (France) M Guinard	6	6
Q	(Argentina) M González (Argentina) A Molteni	7^{7}	6
(Peru) I Buse (Italy) L Darderi	6^{4}	3
(Argentina) F Cerúndolo (Argentina) TM Etcheverry	7^{10}	7
3	(El Salvador) M Arévalo (Croatia) M Pavić	6^{8}	5
(United States) R Seggerman (United States) L Tien	6	6
WC	(Austria) L Neumayer (Austria) J Rodionov	0	2
(Brazil) O Luz (Brazil) R Matos	3	4
2	(United States) C Harrison (United Kingdom) N Skupski	6	6

Quarterfinals
1	(Finland) H Heliövaara (United Kingdom) H Patten	7^{7}	6^{2}	[5]
(Austria) L Miedler (Austria) N Oberleitner	6^{5}	7^{7}	[10]
4	(Italy) S Bolelli (Italy) A Vavassori	7^{7}	2	[9]
(Argentina) G Andreozzi (France) M Guinard	6^{5}	6	[11]
Q	(Argentina) M González (Argentina) A Molteni	3	2
(Argentina) F Cerúndolo (Argentina) TM Etcheverry	6	6
(United States) R Seggerman (United States) L Tien	7^{7}	7^{7}
2	(United States) C Harrison (United Kingdom) N Skupski	6^{4}	6^{2}

Semifinals
(Austria) L Miedler (Austria) N Oberleitner	7^{7}	7^{11}
(Argentina) G Andreozzi (France) M Guinard	6^{0}	6^{9}
(Argentina) F Cerúndolo (Argentina) TM Etcheverry	3	6^{9}
(United States) R Seggerman (United States) L Tien	6	7^{11}

Final
(Austria) L Miedler (Austria) N Oberleitner	6	7
(United States) R Seggerman (United States) L Tien	1	5

== Qualifying ==
=== Seeds ===
1. (Netherlands) Sander Arends / (United Kingdom) Luke Johnson (qualifying competition)
2. (Argentina) Máximo González / (Argentina) Andrés Molteni (qualified)

=== Qualifiers ===
1. (Argentina) Máximo González / (Argentina) Andrés Molteni

=== Qualifying draw ===
First round
1	(Netherlands) Sander Arends (United Kingdom) Luke Johnson	7	7^{8}
WC	(Tunisia) Skander Mansouri (Austria) Maximilian Neuchrist	5	6^{6}
(Mexico) Santiago González (Netherlands) Bart Stevens	5	3
2	(Argentina) Máximo González (Argentina) Andrés Molteni	7	6

Qualifying competition
1	(Netherlands) Sander Arends (United Kingdom) Luke Johnson	5	6^{5}
2	(Argentina) Máximo González (Argentina) Andrés Molteni	7	7^{7}
