= 2026 in tennis =

This page covers all the important events in the sport of tennis in 2026. It provides the results of notable tournaments throughout the year on both the ATP and WTA Tours, the Davis Cup, and the Billie Jean King Cup.

== ITF ==
=== Grand Slam tournaments ===
Category	Championship	Champions	Finalists	Score in the final
Men's singles	Australian Open	(Spain) Carlos Alcaraz	(Serbia) Novak Djokovic	2–6, 6–2, 6–3, 7–5
Men's singles	French Open	(Germany) Alexander Zverev	(Italy) Flavio Cobolli	6–1, 4–6, 6–4, 6–7^{(5–7)}, 6–1
Men's singles	Wimbledon	(Italy) Jannik Sinner	(Germany) Alexander Zverev	6–7^{(7–9)}, 7–6^{(7–2)}, 6–3, 6–4
Men's singles	US Open	(Germany) Alexander Zverev	(United States) Ben Shelton	6–3, 7–6^{(7–2)}, 5–7, 6–2

Category	Championship	Champions	Finalists	Score in the final
Women's singles	Australian Open	(Kazakhstan) Elena Rybakina	(Note: Russian and Belarus players are not allowed to compete under the name or flag of their country following the Russian invasion of Ukraine.) Aryna Sabalenka	6–4, 4–6, 6–4
Women's singles	French Open	Mirra Andreeva	(Poland) Maja Chwalińska	6–3, 6–2
Women's singles	Wimbledon	(Czech Republic) Linda Nosková	(Czech Republic) Karolína Muchová	6–2, 5–7, 6–3
Women's singles	US Open	(Kazakhstan) Elena Rybakina	Aryna Sabalenka	6–4, 5–7, 6–2

Category	Championship	Champions	Finalists	Score in the final
Men's doubles	Australian Open	(United States) Christian Harrison (United Kingdom) Neal Skupski	(Australia) Jason Kubler (Australia) Marc Polmans	7–6^{(7–4)}, 6–4
Men's doubles	French Open	(Spain) Marcel Granollers (Argentina) Horacio Zeballos	(Finland) Harri Heliövaara (United Kingdom) Henry Patten	6–4, 6–2
Men's doubles	Wimbledon	(Finland) Harri Heliövaara (United Kingdom) Henry Patten	(El Salvador) Marcelo Arévalo (Croatia) Mate Pavić	7–6^{(7–4)}, 7–6^{(7–3)}
Men's doubles	US Open	(United States) Christian Harrison (United Kingdom) Neal Skupski	(Germany) Kevin Krawietz (Germany) Tim Pütz	6–4, 7–6^{(8–6)}

Category	Championship	Champions	Finalists	Score in the final
Women's doubles	Australian Open	(Belgium) Elise Mertens (China) Zhang Shuai	(Kazakhstan) Anna Danilina (Serbia) Aleksandra Krunić	7–6^{(7–4)}, 6–4
Women's doubles	French Open	(Czech Republic) Kateřina Siniaková (United States) Taylor Townsend	(Kazakhstan) Anna Danilina (Serbia) Aleksandra Krunić	6–2, 7–5
Women's doubles	Wimbledon	(China) Guo Hanyu (France) Kristina Mladenovic	(Canada) Gabriela Dabrowski (Brazil) Luisa Stefani	6–3, 7–5
Women's doubles	US Open	(Czech Republic) Kateřina Siniaková (United States) Taylor Townsend	(United States) Ashlyn Krueger (United States) Robin Montgomery	5–7, 6–0, 6–2

Category	Championship	Champions	Finalists	Score in the final
Mixed doubles	Australian Open	(Australia) Olivia Gadecki (Australia) John Peers	(France) Kristina Mladenovic (France) Manuel Guinard	4–6, 6–3, [10–8]
Mixed doubles	French Open	(Italy) Sara Errani (Italy) Andrea Vavassori	(Canada) Gabriela Dabrowski (United States) Evan King	4–6, 6–3, [10–4]
Mixed doubles	Wimbledon	(Latvia) Jeļena Ostapenko (El Salvador) Marcelo Arévalo	(Australia) Storm Hunter (Australia) Marc Polmans	4–6, 7–5, 6–2
Mixed doubles	US Open	(Czech Republic) Karolína Muchová (Czech Republic) Jakub Menšík	(Switzerland) Belinda Bencic (Italy) Flavio Cobolli	6–3, 1–6, [10–6]

== Davis Cup ==
All matches take place on indoor hard courts at the SuperTennis Arena, Bologna, Italy.

Quarterfinals
1	Italy
South Korea
4	Czech Republic
Canada
Great Britain
3	Germany
Austria
2	Spain

Semifinals

Final

== Billie Jean King Cup ==
Quarterfinals
1	Italy	2
China	1
3	Ukraine	2
Belgium	1
Kazakhstan	1
4	Spain	2
Czech Republic	2
2	Great Britain	0

Semifinals
1	Italy	0
3	Ukraine	2
4	Spain	0
Czech Republic	2

Finals
3	Ukraine	0
Czech Republic	2

== ATP/WTA ==
=== ATP Finals/WTA Finals ===
==== Men's singles ====
Championship	Champion	Finalist	Score in the final
Turin	(Spain) Carlos Alcaraz	(Germany) Alexander Zverev	6–2, 7–6^{(9–7)}

==== Women's singles ====
Championship	Champion	Finalist	Score in the final
Indian Wells	Mirra Andreeva	(Ukraine) Elina Svitolina	7–5, 6–3

==== Men's doubles ====
Championship	Champions	Finalists	Score in the final
Turin	(France) Théo Arribagé (France) Albano Olivetti	(El Salvador) Marcelo Arévalo (Croatia) Mate Pavić	3–6, 7–6^{(7–2)}, [10–6]

==== Women's doubles ====
Championship	Champion	Finalist	Score in the final
Indian Wells	(Czech Republic) Kateřina Siniaková (United States) Taylor Townsend	(Italy) Sara Errani (Italy) Jasmine Paolini	6–4, 6–3

=== ATP Masters 1000/WTA 1000 ===
==== Men's singles ====
Championship	Champions	Finalists	Score in the final
Indian Wells Masters	(Italy) Jannik Sinner	Daniil Medvedev	7–6^{(8–6)}, 7–6^{(7–4)}
Miami Open	(Italy) Jannik Sinner	(Czech Republic) Jiří Lehečka	6–4, 6–4
Monte-Carlo Masters	(Italy) Jannik Sinner	(Spain) Carlos Alcaraz	7–6^{(7–5)}, 6–3
Madrid Open	(Italy) Jannik Sinner	(Germany) Alexander Zverev	6–1, 6–2
Italian Open	(Italy) Jannik Sinner	(Norway) Casper Ruud	6–4, 6–4
Canadian Open	(United States) Ben Shelton	(United States) Brandon Nakashima	6–3, 7–6^{(7–4)}
Cincinnati Open	(France) Arthur Fils	(United States) Frances Tiafoe	6–3, 1–6, 6–0
Shanghai Masters	(Spain) Alejandro Davidovich Fokina	(Spain) Rafael Jódar	1–6, 7–6^{(7–5)}, 6–4
Paris Masters	(Spain) Carlos Alcaraz	(United States) Ben Shelton	7–6^{(7–5)}, 7–5

==== Men's doubles ====
Championship	Champions	Finalists	Score in the final
Indian Wells Masters	(Argentina) Guido Andreozzi (France) Manuel Guinard	(France) Arthur Rinderknech (Monaco) Valentin Vacherot	7–6^{(7–3)}, 6–3
Miami Open	(Italy) Simone Bolelli (Italy) Andrea Vavassori	(Finland) Harri Heliövaara (United Kingdom) Henry Patten	6–4, 6–2
Monte-Carlo Masters	(Germany) Kevin Krawietz (Germany) Tim Pütz	(El Salvador) Marcelo Arévalo (Croatia) Mate Pavić	4–6, 6–2, [10–8]
Madrid Open	(Finland) Harri Heliövaara (United Kingdom) Henry Patten	(Argentina) Guido Andreozzi (France) Manuel Guinard	6–3, 3–6, [10–7]
Italian Open	(Italy) Simone Bolelli (Italy) Andrea Vavassori	(Spain) Marcel Granollers (Argentina) Horacio Zeballos	7–6^{(10–8)}, 6–7^{(3–7)}, [10–3]
Canadian Open	(Brazil) Orlando Luz (Brazil) Rafael Matos	(El Salvador) Marcelo Arévalo (Croatia) Mate Pavić	5−7, 6−4, [10−6]
Cincinnati Masters	(Brazil) Orlando Luz (Brazil) Rafael Matos	(Germany) Constantin Frantzen (Netherlands) Robin Haase	6–4, 3–6, [10–7]
Shanghai Masters	(Austria) Lucas Miedler (Austria) Neil Oberleitner	(Portugal) Francisco Cabral (United States) JJ Tracy	6–3, 6–4
Paris Masters	(France) Quentin Halys (France) Pierre-Hugues Herbert	(United States) Christian Harrison (United Kingdom) Neal Skupski	7–6^{(7–3)}, 6–7^{(4–7)}, [10–8]

==== Women's singles ====
Championship	Champions	Finalists	Score in the final
Qatar Open	(Czech Republic) Karolína Muchová	(Canada) Victoria Mboko	6–4, 7–5
Dubai Championships	(United States) Jessica Pegula	(Ukraine) Elina Svitolina	6–2, 6–4
Indian Wells Open	Aryna Sabalenka	(Kazakhstan) Elena Rybakina	3–6, 6–3, 7–6^{(8–6)}
Miami Open	Aryna Sabalenka	(United States) Coco Gauff	6–2, 4–6, 6–3
Madrid Open	(Ukraine) Marta Kostyuk	Mirra Andreeva	6–3, 7–5
Italian Open	(Ukraine) Elina Svitolina	(United States) Coco Gauff	6–4, 6–7^{(3–7)}, 6–2
Canadian Open	(Poland) Iga Świątek	(Kazakhstan) Elena Rybakina	6–2, 6–3
Cincinnati Open	(United States) Coco Gauff	(United States) Jessica Pegula	6–2, 6–4
China Open	(China) Zheng Qinwen	Mirra Andreeva	7–5, 6–4
Wuhan Open	(Poland) Maja Chwalińska	(United Kingdom) Sonay Kartal	2–6, 6–4, 6–2

==== Women's doubles ====
Championship	Champions	Finalists	Score in the final
Qatar Open	(Kazakhstan) Anna Danilina (Serbia) Aleksandra Krunić	(Chinese Taipei) Hsieh Su-wei (Latvia) Jeļena Ostapenko	0–6, 7–6^{(7–3)}, [10–8]
Dubai Championships	(Canada) Gabriela Dabrowski (Brazil) Luisa Stefani	(Germany) Laura Siegemund; Vera Zvonareva	6–1, 6–3
Indian Wells Open	(Czech Republic) Kateřina Siniaková (United States) Taylor Townsend	(Kazakhstan) Anna Danilina (Serbia) Aleksandra Krunić	7–6^{(7–4)}, 6–4
Miami Open	(Czech Republic) Kateřina Siniaková (United States) Taylor Townsend	(Italy) Jasmine Paolini (Italy) Sara Errani	7–6^{(7–0)}, 6–1
Madrid Open	(Czech Republic) Kateřina Siniaková (United States) Taylor Townsend	Mirra Andreeva; Diana Shnaider	7–6^{(7–2)}, 6–2
Italian Open	Mirra Andreeva; Diana Shnaider	(Spain) Cristina Bucșa (United States) Nicole Melichar-Martinez	6–3, 6–3
Canadian Open	(Czech Republic) Kateřina Siniaková (China) Zhang Shuai	(Italy) Sara Errani (United States) Nicole Melichar-Martinez	6–3, 6–4
Cincinnati Open	(Czech Republic) Marie Bouzková (Czech Republic) Linda Nosková	(Belgium) Magali Kempen; Alexandra Panova	6–1, 6–2
China Open	(Canada) Gabriela Dabrowski (Brazil) Luisa Stefani	(Czech Republic) Kateřina Siniaková (China) Zhang Shuai	6–1, 6–2
Wuhan Open	(Canada) Gabriela Dabrowski (Brazil) Luisa Stefani	(Australia) Storm Hunter (Czech Republic) Kateřina Siniaková	7–5, 6–4

== International Tennis Hall of Fame ==
- Class of 2026:
  - Mary Carillo, contributor
  - Roger Federer, player
