= 2026 Abierto Mexicano Telcel =

- Date: 23–28 February
- Edition: 33rd
- Draw: 32S / 16D
- Surface: Hard, outdoor
- Location: Acapulco, Mexico
- Venue: Arena GNP Seguros

Champions

Singles
- (Italy) Flavio Cobolli

Doubles
- (Brazil) Marcelo Melo / (Germany) Alexander Zverev
- Mexican Open

The 2026 Mexican Open (also known as the Abierto Mexicano Telcel presentado por HSBC for sponsorship reasons) was a professional tennis tournament played on outdoor hard courts. It was the 33rd edition of the men's Mexican Open, an ATP 500 tournament on the 2026 ATP Tour. The tournament took place in Acapulco, Mexico between 23 and 28 February 2026, at the Arena GNP Seguros.

== Champions ==
=== Singles ===
- (Italy) Flavio Cobolli def. (United States) Frances Tiafoe, 7–6^{(7–4)}, 6–4

=== Doubles ===
- (Brazil) Marcelo Melo / (Germany) Alexander Zverev def. (Austria) Alexander Erler / (United States) Robert Galloway, 6–3, 6–4

== Singles main-draw entrants ==
=== Seeds ===
Country	Player	Ranking	Seed
GER	Alexander Zverev	4	1
AUS	Alex de Minaur	6	2
NOR	Casper Ruud	13	3
ESP	Alejandro Davidovich Fokina	15	4
ITA	Flavio Cobolli	20	5
MON	Valentin Vacherot	26	6
GBR	Cameron Norrie	27	7
USA	Frances Tiafoe	28	8

- Rankings as of 16 February 2026.

=== Other entrants ===
The following players received wildcards into the main draw:

- (Spain) Rafael Jódar
- (France) Gaël Monfils
- (Mexico) Rodrigo Pacheco Méndez

The following players received entry from the qualifying draw:

- (United States) Patrick Kypson
- (Japan) Sho Shimabukuro
- (China) Wu Yibing
- (Sweden) Elias Ymer

The following players received entry as lucky losers:

- (Australia) Rinky Hijikata
- (Hong Kong) Coleman Wong

=== Withdrawals ===
- (France) Arthur Cazaux → replaced by (France) Adrian Mannarino
- (Canada) Gabriel Diallo → replaced by (Hong Kong) Coleman Wong (LL)
- (United States) Marcos Giron → replaced by (Australia) James Duckworth
- (United States) Sebastian Korda → replaced by (Australia) Rinky Hijikata (LL)
- (Italy) Lorenzo Musetti → replaced by (Italy) Mattia Bellucci
- (United States) Ben Shelton → replaced by (Australia) Adam Walton

== Doubles main-draw entrants ==
=== Seeds ===
Country	Player	Country	Player	Rank^{1}	Seed
USA	Christian Harrison	GBR	Neal Skupski	12	1
MON	Hugo Nys	FRA	Édouard Roger-Vasselin	33	2
FRA	Sadio Doumbia	FRA	Fabien Reboul	49	3
GBR	Luke Johnson	POL	Jan Zieliński	55	4

- ^{1} Rankings as of 16 February 2026.

=== Other entrants ===
The following pairs received wildcards into the doubles main draw:

- (Portugal) Nuno Borges / (Mexico) Miguel Ángel Reyes-Varela
- (Spain) Rafael Jódar / (Mexico) Rodrigo Pacheco Méndez

The following pair received entry from the qualifying draw:

- (United States) Vasil Kirkov / (Netherlands) Bart Stevens
