= 2026 United Cup =

International tennis tournament

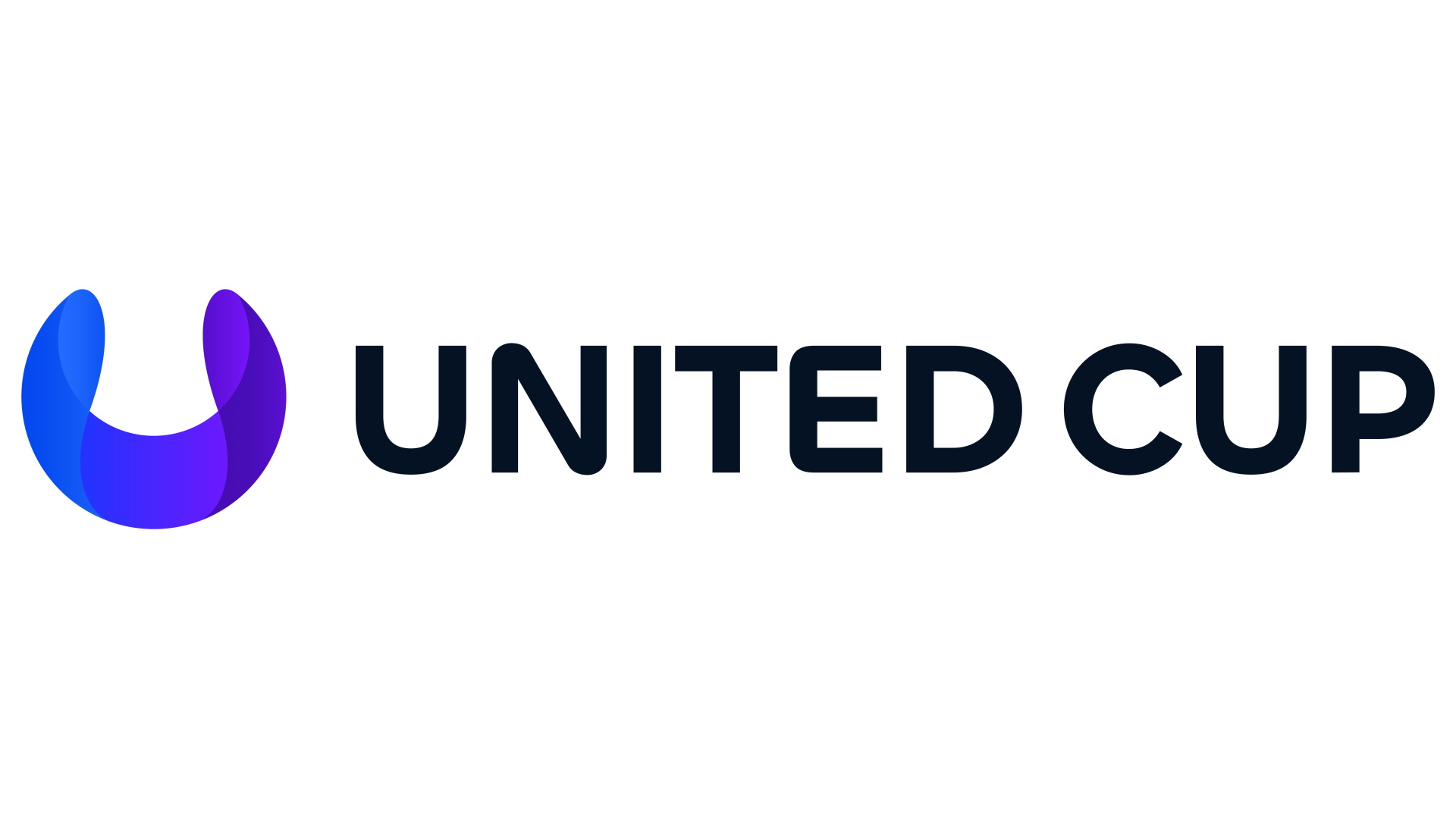
- Date: 2 – 11 January 2026
- Edition: 4th
- Category: United Cup
- Draw: 18 teams
- Prize money: US$11,170,000
- Surface: Hard / outdoor
- Location: Perth, Western Australia; Sydney, New South Wales; Australia
- Venue: RAC Arena; Ken Rosewall Arena

Champions
- Poland (1st title)
- United Cup

The 2026 United Cup was the fourth edition of the United Cup, an international outdoor hard court mixed-gender team tennis tournament that was held by the Association of Tennis Professionals (ATP) and the Women's Tennis Association (WTA). Serving as the opener for the 2026 ATP Tour and the 2026 WTA Tour, it happened from 2 to 11 January 2026 at two venues in the Australian cities of Perth and Sydney. It was offering both ATP rankings and WTA rankings points to its players: a player was able to win a maximum of 500 points.

Team Poland, captained by Mateusz Tarczyński, won the title after defeating Team Switzerland 2–1 in the final, claiming their first United Cup title. The winning team consisted of Iga Świątek, Hubert Hurkacz, Jan Zieliński, Katarzyna Kawa, Daniel Michalski and Katarzyna Piter. It was Poland's third United Cup final and first title.

Team United States were the defending champions but were defeated in the semifinal by team Poland.

Belinda Bencic of Team Switzerland was named the MVP of the tournament.

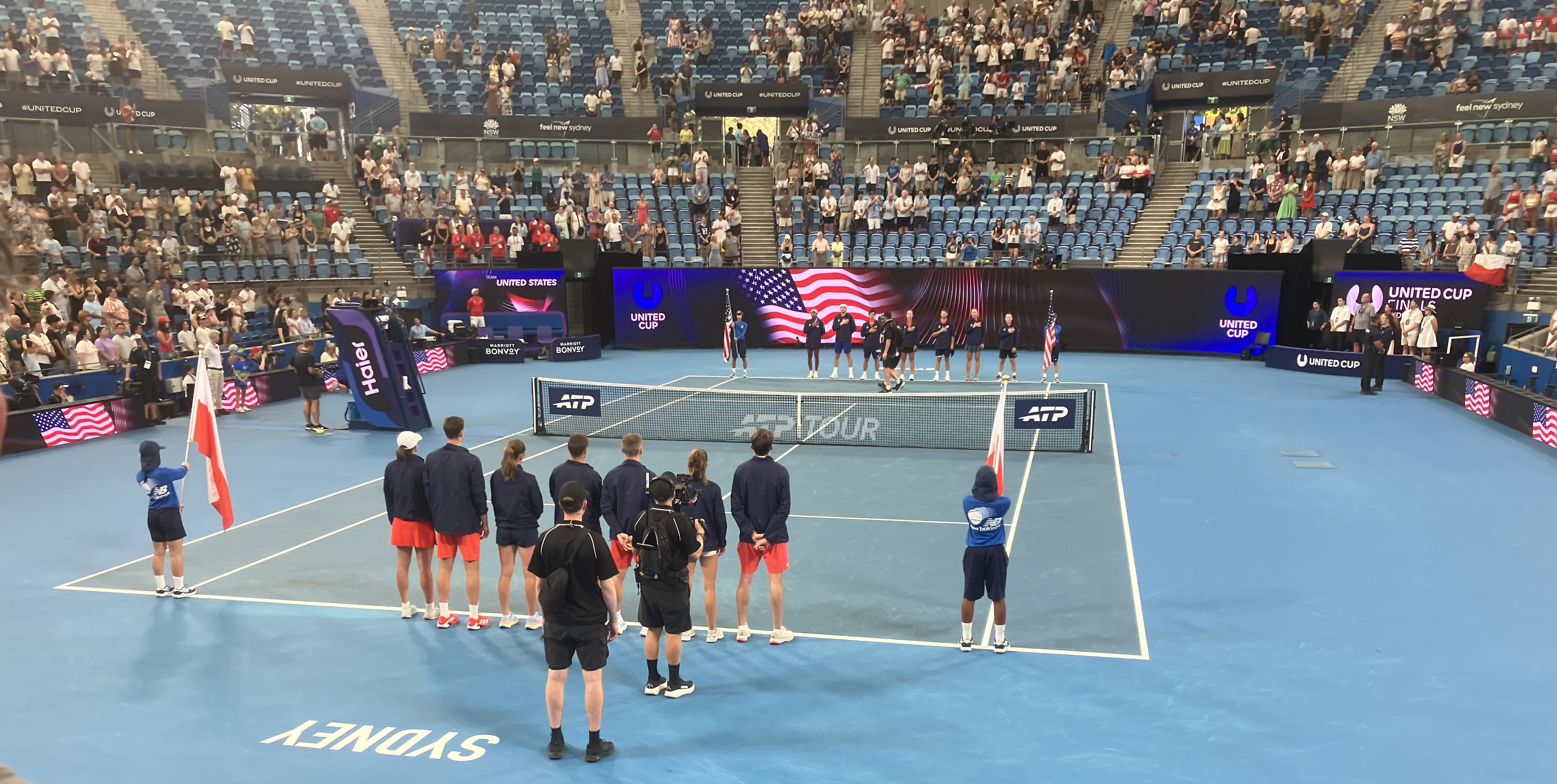
Champions Team Poland standing in a line prior to the 2026 United Cup semifinals

== Format ==
Both cities hosted three groups of three countries in a round robin format. Each tie consisted of one men's and one women's singles match, and one mixed doubles match.

The six group winners and the best runner-up in each city advanced to the quarterfinals.

== Qualification ==
18 countries qualified as follows:

- Five countries qualified based on the ATP ranking of their number one ranked singles player.
- Five countries qualified based on the WTA ranking of their number one ranked singles player.
- Eight countries qualified based on the combined ranking of their number one ranked ATP and WTA players.

In exchange for being the host nation, Australia was guaranteed one of the spots reserved for teams with the best combined ranking if it would have failed to qualify on its own.

Teams will feature up to three players from each tour.

== Venues ==
Perth and Sydney each were hosting three groups of three countries in a round robin format and two quarterfinals. Sydney hosted the semifinals and the final on the last two days of the tournament.

Image	Name	Opened	Capacity	Location	Events	Map
	RAC Arena	2012	15,500	Perth, Western Australia	Group stage, Quarterfinals	2026 United Cup is located in Australia
	Ken Rosewall Arena	1999	10,500	Sydney, New South Wales	Group stage, Quarterfinals, Semifinals, Final	2026 United Cup is located in Australia

== ATP / WTA ranking points ==
=== ATP ===
Round	Points per win vs. opponent ranked						
Round	No. 1–10	No. 11–20	No. 21–30	No. 31–50	No. 51–100	No. 101–250	No. 251+
Final	180	140	120	90	60	40	35
Semifinals	130	105	90	60	40	35	25
Quarterfinals	80	65	55	40	35	25	20
Group stage	55	45	40	35	25	20	15

- Maximum 500 points

=== WTA ===
Number of match wins	Ranking points
5 match wins	500
4 match wins	325
3 match wins	150
2 match wins (1 of 2 from QF, SF or F)	108
2 match wins (round robin)	90
1 match win (QF, SF or F)	60
1 match win (round robin)	32
0 match wins	1

- Maximum 500 points

== Entries ==
18 countries qualified based on the ATP/WTA rankings on 10 November 2025 and players' commitment to play at the event. Poland were the first country to confirm entry, doing so on 12 October 2025. Great Britain and Australia followed shortly after, on 29 October. All teams then confirmed their entry on 13 November.

Seed	Nation	Crit.	No. 1 ATP	Rank	No. 1 WTA	Rank	No. 2 ATP	No. 2 WTA	Doubles ATP	Doubles WTA	Captain	Nat.
1	United States	WTA #2	Taylor Fritz	6	Coco Gauff	3	Mackenzie McDonald	Varvara Lepchenko	Christian Harrison	Nicole Melichar-Martinez	Michael Russell	(United States)
2	Canada	ATP #3	Félix Auger-Aliassime	8	Victoria Mboko	18	Alexis Galarneau	Kayla Cross	Cleeve Harper	Ariana Arseneault	Félix Auger-Aliassime	(Canada)
3	Italy	WTA #3	Flavio Cobolli	22	Jasmine Paolini	8	Andrea Pellegrino	Nuria Brancaccio	Andrea Vavassori	Sara Errani	Stefano Cobolli	(Italy)
4	Australia	ATP #2	Alex de Minaur	7	Maya Joint	32	Jason Kubler	Maddison Inglis	John-Patrick Smith	Storm Hunter	Lleyton Hewitt	(Australia)
5	Great Britain	ATP #4	Billy Harris (Note: Replacement for a withdrawn No. 1 player)	124	Emma Raducanu	29	Jan Choinski	Katie Swan	Neal Skupski	Olivia Nicholls	Tim Henman	(United Kingdom)
6	Germany	ATP #1	Alexander Zverev	3	Eva Lys	40	Patrick Zahraj	Laura Siegemund	Kevin Krawietz	Mina Hodzic (Note: 3rd singles player instead of doubles)	Alexander Zverev Sr.	(Germany)
7	Belgium	Comb #1	Zizou Bergs	43	Elise Mertens	20	Kimmer Coppejans	Greet Minnen	Sander Gillé	Lara Salden	Christopher Heyman	(Belgium)
8	France	Comb #2	Arthur Rinderknech	29	Léolia Jeanjean	106	Geoffrey Blancaneaux	Tiantsoa Rakotomanga	Édouard Roger-Vasselin	Elixane Lechemia	Lucas Pouille	(France)
9	Poland	WTA #1	Hubert Hurkacz	75	Iga Świątek	2	Daniel Michalski	Katarzyna Kawa	Jan Zieliński	Katarzyna Piter	Mateusz Terczyński	(Poland)
10	Spain	Comb #3	Jaume Munar	36	Jéssica Bouzas Maneiro	42	Carlos Taberner	Andrea Lázaro García	Íñigo Cervantes	Yvonne Cavallé Reimers	Miguel Sánchez	(Spain)
11	Czech Republic	Comb #4	Jakub Menšík	19	Barbora Krejčíková	10^{PR(65)}	Dalibor Svrčina	Linda Fruhvirtová	Adam Pavlásek	Miriam Škoch	Jiří Novák	(Czech Republic)
12	Greece	Comb #5	Stefanos Tsitsipas	34	Maria Sakkari	52	Stefanos Sakellaridis	Despina Papamichail	Petros Tsitsipas	Sapfo Sakellaridi	Petros Tsitsipas	(Greece)
13	Japan	WTA #5	Shintaro Mochizuki	92	Naomi Osaka	16	Yasutaka Uchiyama	Nao Hibino	—	—	Go Soeda	(Japan)
14	Argentina	Comb #6	Sebastián Báez	45	Solana Sierra	66	Marco Trungelliti	María Lourdes Carlé	Guido Andreozzi	Nicole Fossa Huergo	Sebastian Gutierrez	(Argentina)
15	Netherlands	Comb #7	Tallon Griekspoor	25	Suzan Lamens	87	Guy den Ouden	Eva Vedder	David Pel	Demi Schuurs	Tallon Griekspoor	(Netherlands)
16	Switzerland	WTA #4	Stan Wawrinka	157	Belinda Bencic	11	Jakub Paul	—	Luca Castelnuovo	Naïma Karamoko	Stan Wawrinka	(Switzerland)
17	Norway	ATP #5	Casper Ruud	12	Malene Helgø	478	Viktor Durasovic	Astrid Brune Olsen	—	Ulrikke Eikeri	Christian Ruud	(Norway)
18	China	Comb #8	Zhang Zhizhen	60^{PR(408)}	Zhu Lin	50^{PR(166)}	Te Rigele	You Xiaodi	Wang Aoran	—	Wu Di	(China)

=== Withdrawals ===
Seed	Nation	Ass.	Player	Rank	Reason
5	Great Britain	ATP	Jack Draper	10	Arm injury
8	France	WTA	Loïs Boisson	36	Injury

- Singles rankings are as of 10 November 2025
- PR = Protected ranking

== Group stage ==
Qualified for the knockout stage (**in bold**)
Eliminated (in italics)

=== Overview ===
G = Group, T = Ties, M = Matches, S = Sets

G	Winner				Runner-up				Third			
G	Country	T	M	S	Country	T	M	S	Country	T	M	S
A	United States	2–0	4–2	10–5	**Argentina**	1–1	4–2	8–6	Spain	0–2	1–5	4–11
B	Belgium	1–1	4–2	10–6	Canada	1–1	3–3	8–7	China	1–1	2–4	5–10
C	Switzerland	2–0	5–1	11–5	Italy	1–1	3–3	8–7	France	0–2	1–5	4–11
D	Australia	2–0	4–2	8–5	**Czech Republic**	1–1	4–2	8–4	Norway	0–2	1–5	3–10
E	Greece	2–0	5–1	11–4	Great Britain	1–1	3–3	8–8	Japan	0–2	1–5	3–10
F	Poland	2–0	6–0	12–2	Germany	1–1	3–3	7–6	Netherlands	0–2	0–6	1–12

=== Group A ===
Host city: Perth

Pos.	Country	Ties W–L	Matches W–L	Sets W–L	Games W–L
1	**United States**	2–0	4–2	10–5 (67%)	77–66 (54%)
2	**Argentina**	1–1	4–2	8–6 (57%)	66–66 (50%)
3	Spain	0–2	1–5	4–11 (27%)	69–80 (46%)

==== Spain vs. Argentina ====
Spain
0
Perth
2 January 2026

Argentina
3

			1	2	3
1	(Spain) (Argentina)	Jaume Munar; **Sebastián Báez**	4; **6**	4; **6**
2	(Spain) (Argentina)	Jéssica Bouzas Maneiro; **Solana Sierra**	4; **6**	**7**; 5	0; **6**
3	(Spain) (Argentina)	Yvonne Cavallé Reimers / Íñigo Cervantes; **María Lourdes Carlé / Guido Andreozzi**	6^{6} **7^{8}**	2; **6**

==== United States vs. Argentina ====
United States
2
Perth
3 January 2026

Argentina
1

			1	2	3
1	(United States) (Argentina)	Taylor Fritz; **Sebastián Báez**	**6**; 4	5; **7**	4; **6**
2	(United States) (Argentina)	**Coco Gauff**; Solana Sierra	**6**; 1	**6**; 1
3	(United States) (Argentina)	**Coco Gauff / Christian Harrison**; María Lourdes Carlé / Guido Andreozzi	**6**; 4	**6**; 1

==== United States vs. Spain ====
United States
2
Perth
5 January 2026

Spain
1

			1	2	3
1	(United States) (Spain)	Coco Gauff; **Jéssica Bouzas Maneiro**	1; **6**	**7^{7}** 6^{3}	0; **6**
2	(United States) (Spain)	**Taylor Fritz**; Jaume Munar	**7^{7}** 6^{4}	3; **6**	**7^{8}** 6^{6}
3	(United States) (Spain)	**Coco Gauff / Christian Harrison**; Yvonne Cavallé Reimers / Íñigo Cervantes	**7^{7}** 6^{5}	**6**; 0

=== Group B ===
Host city: Sydney

Pos.	Country	Ties W–L	Matches W–L	Sets W–L	Games W–L
1	**Belgium**	1–1	4–2	10–6 (63%)	80–64 (56%)
2	Canada	1–1	3–3	8–7 (53%)	65–57 (53%)
3	China	1–1	2–4	5–10 (33%)	57–81 (41%)

==== Belgium vs. China ====
Belgium
1
Sydney
3 January 2026

China
2

			1	2	3
1	(Belgium) (China)	**Elise Mertens**; Zhu Lin	**6**; 2	**6**; 2
2	(Belgium) (China)	Zizou Bergs; **Zhang Zhizhen**	**7^{7}** 6^{2}	6^{3} **7^{7}**	5; **7**
3	(Belgium) (China)	Elise Mertens / Zizou Bergs; **Zhu Lin / Zhang Zhizhen**	**7**; 5	6^{5} **7^{7}**	6; **10**

==== Canada vs. China ====
Canada
3
Sydney
4 January 2026

China
0

			1	2	3
1	(Canada) (China)	**Victoria Mboko**; Zhu Lin	2; **6**	**6**; 2	**6**; 0
2	(Canada) (China)	**Félix Auger-Aliassime**; Zhang Zhizhen	**6**; 4	**6**; 4
3	(Canada) (China)	**Victoria Mboko / Félix Auger-Aliassime**; You Xiaodi / Te Rigele	**6**; 1	**6**; 3

==== Canada vs. Belgium ====
Canada
0
Sydney
6 January 2026

Belgium
3

			1	2	3
1	(Canada) (Belgium)	Félix Auger-Aliassime; **Zizou Bergs**	4; **6**	2; **6**
2	(Canada) (Belgium)	Victoria Mboko; **Elise Mertens**	3; **6**	**6**; 3	3; **6**
3	(Canada) (Belgium)	Victoria Mboko / Cleeve Harper; **Elise Mertens / Zizou Bergs**	3; **6**	**6**; 3	5; **10**

=== Group C ===
Host city: Perth

Pos.	Country	Ties W–L	Matches W–L	Sets W–L	Games W–L
1	**Switzerland**	2–0	5–1	11–5 (69%)	84–71 (54%)
2	Italy	1–1	3–3	8–7 (53%)	81–78 (51%)
3	France	0–2	1–5	4–11 (27%)	71–87 (45%)

==== France vs. Switzerland ====
France
0
Perth
3 January 2026

Switzerland
3

			1	2	3
1	(France) (Switzerland)	Léolia Jeanjean; **Belinda Bencic**	2; **6**	4; **6**
2	(France) (Switzerland)	Arthur Rinderknech; **Stan Wawrinka**	**7**; 5	6^{5} **7^{7}**	6^{5} **7^{7}**
3	(France) (Switzerland)	Tiantsoa Rakotomanga Rajaonah / Édouard Roger-Vasselin; **Belinda Bencic / Jakub Paul**	2; **6**	**7**; 5	2; **10**

==== Italy vs. Switzerland ====
Italy
1
Perth
4 January 2026

Switzerland
2

			1	2	3
1	(Italy) (Switzerland)	Jasmine Paolini; **Belinda Bencic**	4; **6**	3; **6**
2	(Italy) (Switzerland)	**Flavio Cobolli**; Stan Wawrinka	**6**; 4	6^{2} **7^{7}**	**7^{7}** 6^{4}
3	(Italy) (Switzerland)	Sara Errani / Andrea Vavassori; **Belinda Bencic / Jakub Paul**	5; **7**	**6**; 4	7; **10**

==== Italy vs. France ====
Italy
2
Perth
6 January 2026

France
1

			1	2	3
1	(Italy) (France)	Flavio Cobolli; **Arthur Rinderknech**	**7^{7}** 6^{4}	6^{5} **7^{7}**	5; **7**
2	(Italy) (France)	**Jasmine Paolini**; Léolia Jeanjean	**6**; 2	**6**; 3
3	(Italy) (France)	**Sara Errani / Andrea Vavassori**; Tiantsoa Rakotomanga Rajaonah / Édouard Roger-Vasselin	**7^{8}** 6^{6}	**7^{8}** 6^{6}

=== Group D ===
Host city: Sydney

Pos.	Country	Ties W–L	Matches W–L	Sets W–L	Games W–L
1	**Australia**	2–0	4–2	8–5 (62%)	59–49 (55%)
2	**Czech Republic**	1–1	4–2	8–4 (67%)	61–54 (53%)
3	Norway	0–2	1–5	3–10 (23%)	52–69 (43%)

==== Australia vs. Norway ====
Australia
2
Sydney
3 January 2026

Norway
1

			1	2	3
1	(Australia) (Norway)	**Storm Hunter**; Malene Helgø	**6**; 2	**7^{7}** 6^{3}
2	(Australia) (Norway)	Alex de Minaur; **Casper Ruud**	3; **6**	3; **6**
3	(Australia) (Norway)	**Storm Hunter / John-Patrick Smith**; Ulrikke Eikeri / Viktor Durasovic	4; **6**	**6**; 1	**10**; 4

==== Czech Republic vs. Norway ====
Czech Republic
3
Sydney
5 January 2026

Norway
0

			1	2	3
1	(Czech Republic) (Norway)	**Barbora Krejčíková**; Malene Helgø	**6**; 4	**6**; 3
2	(Czech Republic) (Norway)	**Jakub Menšík**; Casper Ruud	**7**; 5	**7^{8}** 6^{6}
3	(Czech Republic) (Norway)	**Barbora Krejčiková / Adam Pavlásek**; Ulrikke Eikeri / Viktor Durasovic	**7**; 5	**6**; 2

==== Australia vs. Czech Republic ====
Australia
2
Sydney
6 January 2026

Czech Republic
1

			1	2	3
1	(Australia) (Czech Republic)	Maya Joint; **Barbora Krejčíková**	4; **6**	1; **6**
2	(Australia) (Czech Republic)	**Alex de Minaur**; Jakub Menšík	**6**; 4	**6**; 1
3	(Australia) (Czech Republic)	**Storm Hunter / Alex de Minaur**; Miriam Škoch / Dalibor Svrčina	**6**; 2	**6**; 3

=== Group E ===
Host city: Perth

Pos.	Country	Ties W–L	Matches W–L	Sets W–L	Games W–L
1	**Greece**	2–0	5–1	11–4 (73%)	76–51 (60%)
2	Great Britain	1–1	3–3	8–8 (50%)	65–73 (47%)
3	Japan	0–2	1–5	3–10 (23%)	51–68 (43%)

==== Greece vs. Japan ====
Greece
3
Perth
2 January 2026

Japan
0

			1	2	3
1	(Greece) (Japan)	**Maria Sakkari**; Naomi Osaka	**6**; 4	**6**; 2
2	(Greece) (Japan)	**Stefanos Tsitsipas**; Shintaro Mochizuki	**6**; 3	**6**; 4
3	(Greece) (Japan)	**Maria Sakkari / Stefanos Tsitsipas**; Nao Hibino / Yasutaka Uchiyama	**6**; 2	**6**; 3

==== Great Britain vs. Japan ====
Great Britain
2
Perth
4 January 2026

Japan
1

			1	2	3
1	(United Kingdom) (Japan)	**Billy Harris**; Shintaro Mochizuki	**7^{7}** 6^{4}	**6**; 3
2	(United Kingdom) (Japan)	Katie Swan; **Naomi Osaka**	6^{4} **7^{7}**	1; **6**
3	(United Kingdom) (Japan)	**Olivia Nicholls / Neal Skupski**; Nao Hibino / Yasutaka Uchiyama	**7**; 5	4; **6**	**10**; 7

==== Great Britain vs. Greece ====
Great Britain
1
Perth
5 January 2026

Greece
2

			1	2	3
1	(United Kingdom) (Greece)	Billy Harris; **Stefanos Tsitsipas**	**6**; 4	1; **6**	6^{4} **7^{7}**
2	(United Kingdom) (Greece)	Emma Raducanu; **Maria Sakkari**	3; **6**	**6**; 3	1; **6**
3	(United Kingdom) (Greece)	**Olivia Nicholls / Neal Skupski**; Despina Papamichail / Stefanos Sakellaridis	**6**; 2	3; **6**	**10**; 4

=== Group F ===
Host city: Sydney

Pos.	Country	Ties W–L	Matches W–L	Sets W–L	Games W–L
1	**Poland**	2–0	6–0	12–2 (86%)	75–52 (59%)
2	Germany	1–1	3–3	7–6 (54%)	66–54 (55%)
3	Netherlands	0–2	0–6	1–12 (8%)	37–72 (34%)

==== Germany vs. Netherlands ====
Germany
3
Sydney
4 January 2026

Netherlands
0

			1	2	3
1	(Germany) (Netherlands)	**Eva Lys**; Suzan Lamens	**6**; 2	**6**; 2
2	(Germany) (Netherlands)	**Alexander Zverev**; Tallon Griekspoor	**7**; 5	**6**; 0
3	(Germany) (Netherlands)	**Laura Siegemund / Alexander Zverev**; Demi Schuurs / Tallon Griekspoor	**6**; 3	**6**; 2

==== Germany vs. Poland ====
Germany
0
Sydney
5 January 2026

Poland
3

			1	2	3
1	(Germany) (Poland)	Alexander Zverev; **Hubert Hurkacz**	3; **6**	4; **6**
2	(Germany) (Poland)	Eva Lys; **Iga Świątek**	**6**; 3	3; **6**	4; **6**
3	(Germany) (Poland)	Laura Siegemund / Alexander Zverev; **Katarzyna Kawa / Jan Zieliński**	6^{6} **7^{8}**	3; **6**

==== Poland vs. Netherlands ====
Poland
3
Sydney
7 January 2026

Netherlands
0

			1	2	3
1	(Poland) (Netherlands)	**Hubert Hurkacz**; Tallon Griekspoor	**6**; 3	**7^{7}** 6^{4}
2	(Poland) (Netherlands)	**Iga Świątek**; Suzan Lamens	**6**; 3	**6**; 2
3	(Poland) (Netherlands)	**Katarzyna Kawa / Jan Zieliński**; Demi Schuurs / David Pel	**6**; 3	3; **6**	**10**; 4

=== Ranking of second-placed teams ===
The best runner-up quarter-final spot was determined by the number of ties won and the number of ties played. In a tie between three teams, the team having played fewer total matches (singles and mixed doubles) would be eliminated and, if still tied then the team with the most match would win (singles and doubles). If still tied, then the ranking would be determined by, in order: 1) the highest percentage of matches won, 2) the highest percentage of sets won, and 3) the highest percentage of games won.

Host city: Perth

Pos.	Country	Ties W–L	Matches W–L	Sets W–L	Games W–L
1	**Argentina**	1–1	4–2	8–6 (57%)	66–66 (50%)
2	Italy	1–1	3–3	8–7 (53%)	81–78 (51%)
3	Great Britain	1–1	3–3	8–8 (50%)	65–73 (47%)

Host city: Sydney

Pos.	Country	Ties W–L	Matches W–L	Sets W–L	Games W–L
1	**Czech Republic**	1–1	4–2	8–4 (67%)	61–54 (53%)
2	Germany	1–1	3–3	7–6 (54%)	66–54 (55%)
3	Canada	1–1	3–3	8–7 (53%)	65–57 (53%)

== Knockout stage ==
=== Bracket ===
Quarterfinals
7 January – Perth
United States	2
Greece	1
9 January – Sydney
Poland	2
Australia	1
7 January – Perth
Switzerland	2
Argentina	1
8 January – Sydney
Czech Republic	1
Belgium	2

Semifinals
10 January – Sydney
United States	1
Poland	2
10 January – Sydney
Switzerland	2
Belgium	1

Final
11 January – Sydney
Poland	2
Switzerland	1

=== Quarterfinals ===
==== United States vs. Greece ====
United States
2
Perth, RAC Arena
7 January 2026

Greece
1

			1	2	3
1	(United States) (Greece)	Coco Gauff; Maria Sakkari	6; 3	6; 2
2	(United States) (Greece)	Taylor Fritz; Stefanos Tsitsipas	4; 6	5; 7
3	(United States) (Greece)	Coco Gauff / Christian Harrison; Maria Sakkari / Stefanos Tsitsipas	4; 6	6; 4	10; 8

==== Poland vs. Australia ====
Poland
2
Sydney, Ken Rosewall Arena
9 January 2026

Australia
1

			1	2	3
1	(Poland) (Australia)	Iga Świątek; Maya Joint	6; 1	6; 1
2	(Poland) (Australia)	Hubert Hurkacz; Alex de Minaur	4; 6	6; 4	4; 6
3	(Poland) (Australia)	Katarzyna Kawa / Jan Zieliński; Storm Hunter / John-Patrick Smith	6; 4	6; 0

==== Switzerland vs. Argentina ====
Switzerland
2
Perth, RAC Arena
7 January 2026

Argentina
1

			1	2	3
1	(Switzerland) (Argentina)	Belinda Bencic; Solana Sierra	6; 2	6; 2
2	(Switzerland) (Argentina)	Stan Wawrinka; Sebastián Báez	5; 7	4; 6
3	(Switzerland) (Argentina)	Belinda Bencic / Jakub Paul; María Lourdes Carlé / Guido Andreozzi	6; 3	6; 3

==== Czech Republic vs. Belgium ====
Czech Republic
1
Sydney, Ken Rosewall Arena
8 January 2026

Belgium
2

			1	2	3
1	(Czech Republic) (Belgium)	Jakub Menšík; Zizou Bergs	2; 6	6^{4} 7^{7}
2	(Czech Republic) (Belgium)	Barbora Krejčíková; Elise Mertens	7; 5	1; 6	5; 7
3	(Czech Republic) (Belgium)	Linda Fruhvirtová / Dalibor Svrčina; Greet Minnen / Sander Gillé	6^{13} 7^{15}	6; 3	10; 3

=== Semifinals ===
==== United States vs. Poland ====
United States
1
Sydney, Ken Rosewall Arena
10 January 2026

Poland
2

			1	2	3
1	(United States) (Poland)	Taylor Fritz; Hubert Hurkacz	6^{1} 7^{7}	6^{2} 7^{7}
2	(United States) (Poland)	Coco Gauff; Iga Świątek	6; 4	6; 2
3	(United States) (Poland)	Coco Gauff / Christian Harrison; Katarzyna Kawa / Jan Zieliński	6^{5} 7^{7}	6^{3} 7^{7}

==== Switzerland vs. Belgium ====
Switzerland
2
Sydney, Ken Rosewall Arena
10 January 2026

Belgium
1

			1	2	3
1	(Switzerland) (Belgium)	Belinda Bencic; Elise Mertens	6; 3	4; 6	7^{7} 6^{0}
2	(Switzerland) (Belgium)	Stan Wawrinka; Zizou Bergs	3; 6	7^{7} 6^{4}	3; 6
3	(Switzerland) (Belgium)	Belinda Bencic / Jakub Paul; Elise Mertens / Zizou Bergs	6; 3	0; 6	10; 5

=== Final ===
==== Poland vs. Switzerland ====
Poland
2
Sydney, Ken Rosewall Arena
11 January 2026

Switzerland
1

			1	2	3
1	(Poland) (Switzerland)	Iga Świątek; Belinda Bencic	6; 3	0; 6	3; 6
2	(Poland) (Switzerland)	Hubert Hurkacz; Stan Wawrinka	6; 3	3; 6	6; 3
3	(Poland) (Switzerland)	Katarzyna Kawa / Jan Zieliński; Belinda Bencic / Jakub Paul	6; 4	6; 3
