= Shanghai Masters =

There are several sporting events incorporating the name Shanghai Masters:

- Shanghai Masters (snooker)
- Shanghai Masters (tennis)
- BMW Masters, golf tournament formerly known as the Lake Malaren Shanghai Masters
