= 2026 Mirra Andreeva tennis season =

2026 tennis player season

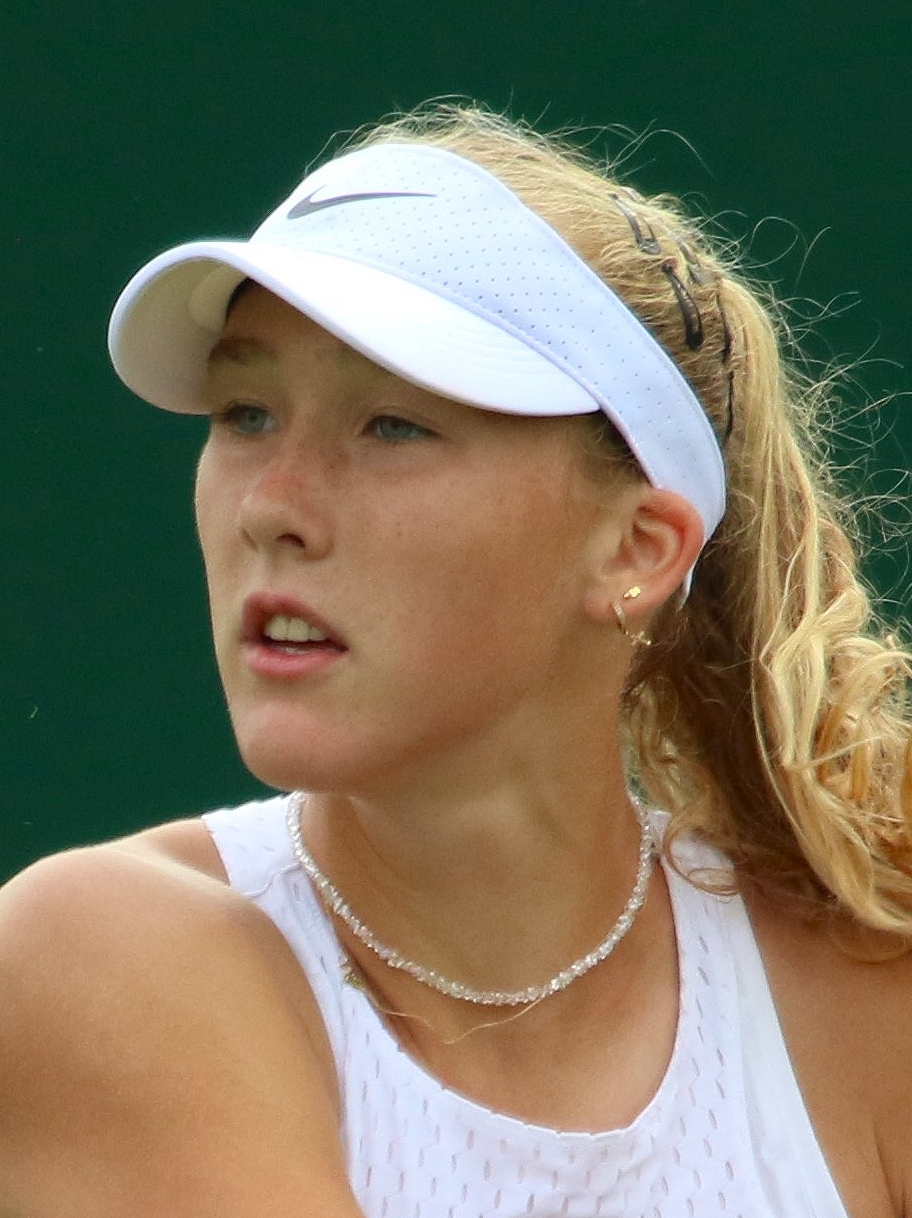
- Mirra Andreeva at the 2023 Wimbledon
- Full name: Mirra Andreeva
- Country: Russia

Singles
- Season record: 55–16 (77%)
- Calendar titles: 4
- Current ranking: No. 2 (16 November 2026)
- Year-end ranking: No. 2
- Ranking change from previous year: ▲7

Grand Slam & significant results
- Australian Open: 4R
- French Open: W
- Wimbledon: 2R
- US Open: QF

Doubles
- Season record: 13–4 (76%)
- Calendar titles: 1
- Current ranking: No. 44
- Ranking change from previous year: ▼29
- Last updated on: 10 October 2026.

The 2026 Mirra Andreeva tennis season officially began on 4 January 2026, with the start of the Brisbane International in Brisbane. Her season was highlighted by winning the women's singles title at the French Open, becoming the youngest winner at the tournament since Monica Seles in 1992.

She reached world no.2 becoming the youngest to do so since Maria Sharapova in 2005, and qualified for the WTA Finals for the first time in her career in this year. She won the WTA Finals on her singles debut at the tournament, not dropping a set along the way. She also won two WTA 500 titles in Adelaide and Linz and reached finals of two WTA 1000 in Madrid and Beijing.

== Yearly summary ==
Andreeva began her 2026 season at the Brisbane International. She defeated qualifier Olivia Gadecki and No. 12 Linda Nosková to reach the quarterfinals, where she lost to No. 26 Marta Kostyuk in straight sets.

At the Adelaide International, Andreeva defeated lucky loser Marie Bouzková, Maya Joint, No. 23 Diana Shnaider, and No. 17 Victoria Mboko to win the title, without dropping a set en route.

At the Australian Open, Andreeva defeated Donna Vekić, Maria Sakkari, and Elena-Gabriela Ruse to reach the fourth round, where she lost to No. 12 Elina Svitolina in straight sets.

At the Qatar Open, Andreeva defeated Magda Linette before losing to No. 13 Victoria Mboko. As the defending champion at the Dubai Championships, Andreeva advanced to the third round after Daria Kasatkina withdrew due to injury. She defeated Jaqueline Cristian to reach the quarterfinals, where she lost to No. 6 Amanda Anisimova in three sets.

As the defending champion at the Indian Wells, Andreeva defeated Solana Sierra before losing to Kateřina Siniaková. In Miami, she defeated McCartney Kessler and Marie Bouzkova before losing again to No. 9 Victoria Mboko.

Opening her clay season at the Linz Open, Andreeva overcame wildcard entrant Sloane Stephens, No. 29 Sorana Cîrstea, Elena-Gabriela Ruse, and Anastasia Potapova to win her second title of the season.

At the Stuttgart Open, Andreeva defeated defending champion Jeļena Ostapenko in the first round in three sets. She defeated qualifier Alycia Parks to reach the quarterfinals, where she defeated No. 4 Iga Świątek in three sets. She lost in the semifinals to No. 2 Elena Rybakina in straight sets.

At the Madrid Open, Andreeva overcame lucky loser Panna Udvardy, qualifier Dalma Galfi, Anna Bondár, No. 25 Leylah Fernandez and Hailey Baptiste to reach her third WTA 1000 final. In the final, she lost to No. 23 Marta Kostyuk in straight sets. At the same tournament, she also made it into the doubles final with Diana Shnaider, losing to second seeds Kateřina Siniaková and Taylor Townsend.

At the Italian Open, Andreeva defeated Antonia Ružić, Viktorija Golubic, and No. 22 Elise Mertens to reach the quarterfinals, where she lost to No. 4 Coco Gauff in three sets. At the same event, she teamed with Shnaider to win her second WTA 1000 doubles title, defeating seventh seeds Cristina Bucșa and Nicole Melichar-Martinez in the final.

Seeded eighth at the French Open, Andreeva recorded wins over wildcard entrant Fiona Ferro, qualifier Marina Bassols Ribera, No. 28 Marie Bouzková, and Jil Teichmann to reach her third straight French Open quarterfinal. She defeated No. 18 Sorana Cîrstea to advance to her second major semifinal. In a rematch of their Madrid final, she defeated No. 15 Marta Kostyuk in straight sets to reach her first major final. In the final, she defeated qualifier Maja Chwalińska in straight sets to win her first major title. She became the youngest French Open champion since Monica Seles in 1992.

Moving onto the grass court swing of the season, Andreeva lost her first match since her Roland Garros triumph, going down to a straight-sets defeat against Ekaterina Alexandrova at the Bad Homburg Open.

At Wimbledon, she overcame Magda Linette before losing to 2024 champion Barbora Krejčíková in the second round.

Starting her North American hard court season at the Canadian Open, Andreeva defeated Karolína Plíšková before losing to Leylah Fernandez. At the Cincinnati Open, she defeated Oleksandra Oliynykova and Janice Tjen before losing to No. 11 Marta Kostyuk in three sets.

At the US Open, Andreeva defeated Janice Tjen, Eva Lys, Nikola Bartůňková, and No. 24 Anastasia Potapova to reach the quarterfinals at the US Open for the first time. In the quarterfinals, she lost again to No. 4 Coco Gauff, despite holding two match points in the second-set tiebreak.

At the China Open, Andreeva came from a set down to defeat wildcard entrant Yuan Yue in her opening match. She defeated Polina Kudermetova and Daria Snigur in straight sets to reach the quarterfinals. She defeated No. 28 Ekaterina Alexandrova in straight sets to reach the semifinals. She defeated Nikola Bartůňková in straight sets to reach her second WTA 1000 final of the season. In the final, she lost to wildcard entrant Zheng Qinwen in straight sets. Despite the loss, Andreeva rose to a career-high No. 3 ranking, becoming the youngest player to enter the top 3 since Maria Sharapova in 2005.

== All matches ==
This table chronicles all the matches of Mirra Andreeva in 2026.

Key
W	F	SF	QF	#R	RR	Q#	P#	DNQ	A	Z#	PO	G	S	B	NMS	NTI	P	NH

(W) winner; (F) finalist; (SF) semifinalist; (QF) quarterfinalist; (#R) rounds 4, 3, 2, 1; (RR) round-robin stage; (Q#) qualification round; (P#) preliminary round; (DNQ) did not qualify; (A) absent; (Z#) Davis/Fed Cup Zonal Group (with number indication) or (PO) play-off; (G) gold, (S) silver or (B) bronze Olympic/Paralympic medal; (NMS) not a Masters tournament; (NTI) not a Tier I tournament; (P) postponed; (NH) not held; (SR) strike rate (events won / competed); (W–L) win–loss record.
To avoid confusion and double counting, these charts are updated at the conclusion of a tournament or when the player's participation has ended.

=== Singles matches ===
Tournament	Match	Round	Opponent	Rank	Result	Score
Brisbane International; Brisbane, Australia; WTA 500; Hard, outdoor; 4 January 2026 – 11 January 2026	–	1R	Bye			
Brisbane International; Brisbane, Australia; WTA 500; Hard, outdoor; 4 January 2026 – 11 January 2026	1	2R	(Australia) Olivia Gadecki (Q)	204	Win	4–6, 6–1, 6–2
Brisbane International; Brisbane, Australia; WTA 500; Hard, outdoor; 4 January 2026 – 11 January 2026	2	3R	(Czech Republic) Linda Nosková (9)	12	Win	5–7, 6–4, 7–5
Brisbane International; Brisbane, Australia; WTA 500; Hard, outdoor; 4 January 2026 – 11 January 2026	3	QF	(Ukraine) Marta Kostyuk (16)	26	Loss	6–7^{(7–9)}, 3–6
Adelaide International; Adelaide, Australia; WTA 500; Hard, outdoor; 12 January 2026 – 18 January 2026	–	1R	Bye			
Adelaide International; Adelaide, Australia; WTA 500; Hard, outdoor; 12 January 2026 – 18 January 2026	4	2R	(Czech Republic) Marie Bouzková (LL)	45	Win	6–3, 6–1
Adelaide International; Adelaide, Australia; WTA 500; Hard, outdoor; 12 January 2026 – 18 January 2026	5	QF	(Australia) Maya Joint	32	Win	6–2, 6–0
Adelaide International; Adelaide, Australia; WTA 500; Hard, outdoor; 12 January 2026 – 18 January 2026	6	SF	Diana Shnaider (Note: Russian and Belarus players are not allowed to compete under the name or flag of their country following the Russian invasion of Ukraine.) (9)	23	Win	6–3, 6–2
Adelaide International; Adelaide, Australia; WTA 500; Hard, outdoor; 12 January 2026 – 18 January 2026	7	W	(Canada) Victoria Mboko (8)	17	Win (1)	6–3, 6–1
Australian Open; Melbourne, Australia; Grand Slam; Hard, outdoor; 18 January 2026 – 1 February 2026	8	1R	(Croatia) Donna Vekić	72	Win	4–6, 6–3, 6–0
Australian Open; Melbourne, Australia; Grand Slam; Hard, outdoor; 18 January 2026 – 1 February 2026	9	2R	(Greece) Maria Sakkari	53	Win	6–0, 6–4
Australian Open; Melbourne, Australia; Grand Slam; Hard, outdoor; 18 January 2026 – 1 February 2026	10	3R	(Romania) Elena-Gabriela Ruse	79	Win	6–3, 6–4
Australian Open; Melbourne, Australia; Grand Slam; Hard, outdoor; 18 January 2026 – 1 February 2026	11	4R	(Ukraine) Elina Svitolina (12)	12	Loss	2–6, 4–6
Qatar Open; Doha, Qatar; WTA 1000; Hard, outdoor; 8 February 2025 – 14 February 2026	–	1R	Bye			
Qatar Open; Doha, Qatar; WTA 1000; Hard, outdoor; 8 February 2025 – 14 February 2026	12	2R	(Poland) Magda Linette	47	Win	7–6^{(7–0)}, 6–1
Qatar Open; Doha, Qatar; WTA 1000; Hard, outdoor; 8 February 2025 – 14 February 2026	13	3R	(Canada) Victoria Mboko (10)	13	Loss	3–6, 6–3, 6–7^{(5–7)}
Dubai Tennis Championships; Dubai, United Arab Emirates; WTA 1000; Hard, outdoor; 15 February 2025 – 21 February 2026	–	1R	Bye			
Dubai Tennis Championships; Dubai, United Arab Emirates; WTA 1000; Hard, outdoor; 15 February 2025 – 21 February 2026	–	2R	(Australia) Daria Kasatkina	61	Walkover	
Dubai Tennis Championships; Dubai, United Arab Emirates; WTA 1000; Hard, outdoor; 15 February 2025 – 21 February 2026	14	3R	(Romania) Jaqueline Cristian	39	Win	7–5, 6–3
Dubai Tennis Championships; Dubai, United Arab Emirates; WTA 1000; Hard, outdoor; 15 February 2025 – 21 February 2026	15	QF	(United States) Amanda Anisimova (2)	6	Loss	6–2, 5–7, 6–7^{(4–7)}
Indian Wells Open; Indian Wells, United States; WTA 1000; Hard, outdoor; 4 March 2026 – 15 March 2026	–	1R	Bye			
Indian Wells Open; Indian Wells, United States; WTA 1000; Hard, outdoor; 4 March 2026 – 15 March 2026	16	2R	(Argentina) Solana Sierra	65	Win	6–0, 6–0
Indian Wells Open; Indian Wells, United States; WTA 1000; Hard, outdoor; 4 March 2026 – 15 March 2026	17	3R	(Czech Republic) Kateřina Siniaková	44	Loss	6–4, 6–7^{(5–7)}, 3–6
Miami Open; Miami, United States; WTA 1000; Hard, outdoor; 17 March 2026 – 29 March 2026	–	1R	Bye			
Miami Open; Miami, United States; WTA 1000; Hard, outdoor; 17 March 2026 – 29 March 2026	18	2R	(United States) McCartney Kessler	51	Win	6–1, 6–7^{(3–7)}, 6–1
Miami Open; Miami, United States; WTA 1000; Hard, outdoor; 17 March 2026 – 29 March 2026	19	3R	(Czech Republic) Marie Bouzková (32)	32	Win	7–6^{(7–4)}, 6–2
Miami Open; Miami, United States; WTA 1000; Hard, outdoor; 17 March 2026 – 29 March 2026	20	4R	(Canada) Victoria Mboko (10)	9	Loss	6–7^{(4–7)}, 6–4, 0–6
Linz Open; Linz, Austria; WTA 500; Clay, indoor; 6 April 2026 – 12 April 2026	–	1R	Bye			
Linz Open; Linz, Austria; WTA 500; Clay, indoor; 6 April 2026 – 12 April 2026	21	2R	(United States) Sloane Stephens (WC)	552	Win	6–4, 6–2
Linz Open; Linz, Austria; WTA 500; Clay, indoor; 6 April 2026 – 12 April 2026	22	QF	(Romania) Sorana Cîrstea (5)	29	Win	7–6^{(7–4)}, 4–6, 6–2
Linz Open; Linz, Austria; WTA 500; Clay, indoor; 6 April 2026 – 12 April 2026	23	SF	(Romania) Elena-Gabriela Ruse	87	Win	6–4, 6–1
Linz Open; Linz, Austria; WTA 500; Clay, indoor; 6 April 2026 – 12 April 2026	24	W	(Austria) Anastasia Potapova	97	Win (2)	1–6, 6–4, 6–3
Stuttgart Open; Stuttgart, Germany; WTA 500; Clay, indoor; 13 April 2026 – 19 April 2026	25	1R	(Latvia) Jeļena Ostapenko	22	Win	5–7, 6–2, 6–4
Stuttgart Open; Stuttgart, Germany; WTA 500; Clay, indoor; 13 April 2026 – 19 April 2026	26	2R	(United States) Alycia Parks (Q)	95	Win	7–6^{(7–3)}, 6–3
Stuttgart Open; Stuttgart, Germany; WTA 500; Clay, indoor; 13 April 2026 – 19 April 2026	27	QF	(Poland) Iga Świątek (3)	4	Win	3–6, 6–4, 6–3
Stuttgart Open; Stuttgart, Germany; WTA 500; Clay, indoor; 13 April 2026 – 19 April 2026	28	SF	(Kazakhstan) Elena Rybakina (1)	2	Loss	5–7, 1–6
Madrid Open; Madrid, Spain; WTA 1000; Clay, outdoor; 21 April 2026 – 3 May 2026	–	1R	Bye			
Madrid Open; Madrid, Spain; WTA 1000; Clay, outdoor; 21 April 2026 – 3 May 2026	29	2R	(Hungary) Panna Udvardy (LL)	78	Win	7–5, 6–2
Madrid Open; Madrid, Spain; WTA 1000; Clay, outdoor; 21 April 2026 – 3 May 2026	30	3R	(Hungary) Dalma Gálfi (Q)	117	Win	6–3, 6–2
Madrid Open; Madrid, Spain; WTA 1000; Clay, outdoor; 21 April 2026 – 3 May 2026	31	4R	(Hungary) Anna Bondár	63	Win	6–7^{(5–7)}, 6–3, 7–6^{(7–5)}
Madrid Open; Madrid, Spain; WTA 1000; Clay, outdoor; 21 April 2026 – 3 May 2026	32	QF	(Canada) Leylah Fernandez (24)	25	Win	7–6^{(7–1)}, 6–3
Madrid Open; Madrid, Spain; WTA 1000; Clay, outdoor; 21 April 2026 – 3 May 2026	33	SF	(United States) Hailey Baptiste (30)	32	Win	6–4, 7–6^{(10–8)}
Madrid Open; Madrid, Spain; WTA 1000; Clay, outdoor; 21 April 2026 – 3 May 2026	34	F	(Ukraine) Marta Kostyuk (26)	23	Loss	3–6, 5–7
Italian Open; Rome, Italy; WTA 1000; Clay, outdoor; 4 May 2026 – 17 May 2026	–	1R	Bye			
Italian Open; Rome, Italy; WTA 1000; Clay, outdoor; 4 May 2026 – 17 May 2026	35	2R	(Croatia) Antonia Ružić	59	Win	6–1, 6–0
Italian Open; Rome, Italy; WTA 1000; Clay, outdoor; 4 May 2026 – 17 May 2026	36	3R	(Switzerland) Viktorija Golubic	90	Win	6–1, 4–6, 6–0
Italian Open; Rome, Italy; WTA 1000; Clay, outdoor; 4 May 2026 – 17 May 2026	37	4R	(Belgium) Elise Mertens (21)	22	Win	6–3, 6–3
Italian Open; Rome, Italy; WTA 1000; Clay, outdoor; 4 May 2026 – 17 May 2026	38	QF	(United States) Coco Gauff (3)	4	Loss	6–4, 2–6, 4–6
French Open; Paris, France; Grand Slam; Clay, outdoor; 24 May 2026 – 8 June 2026	39	1R	(France) Fiona Ferro (WC)	181	Win	6–3, 6–3
French Open; Paris, France; Grand Slam; Clay, outdoor; 24 May 2026 – 8 June 2026	40	2R	(Spain) Marina Bassols Ribera (Q)	175	Win	3–6, 6–1, 6–1
French Open; Paris, France; Grand Slam; Clay, outdoor; 24 May 2026 – 8 June 2026	41	3R	(Czech Republic) Marie Bouzková (27)	28	Win	6–4, 6–2
French Open; Paris, France; Grand Slam; Clay, outdoor; 24 May 2026 – 8 June 2026	42	4R	(Switzerland) Jil Teichmann	175	Win	6–3, 6–2
French Open; Paris, France; Grand Slam; Clay, outdoor; 24 May 2026 – 8 June 2026	43	QF	(Romania) Sorana Cîrstea (18)	18	Win	6–0, 6–3
French Open; Paris, France; Grand Slam; Clay, outdoor; 24 May 2026 – 8 June 2026	44	SF	(Ukraine) Marta Kostyuk (15)	15	Win	6–1, 6–3
French Open; Paris, France; Grand Slam; Clay, outdoor; 24 May 2026 – 8 June 2026	45	W	(Poland) Maja Chwalińska (Q)	114	Win (3)	6–3, 6–2
Bad Homburg Open; Bad Homburg, Germany; WTA 500; Grass, outdoor; 21 June 2026 – 27 June 2026	–	1R	Bye			
Bad Homburg Open; Bad Homburg, Germany; WTA 500; Grass, outdoor; 21 June 2026 – 27 June 2026	46	2R	Ekaterina Alexandrova	19	Loss	3–6, 4–6
Wimbledon Championships; London, Great Britain; Grand Slam; Grass, outdoor; 29 June 2026 – 12 July 2026	47	1R	(Poland) Magda Linette	59	Win	7–5, 6–4
Wimbledon Championships; London, Great Britain; Grand Slam; Grass, outdoor; 29 June 2026 – 12 July 2026	48	2R	(Czech Republic) Barbora Krejčíková	38	Loss	6–4, 5–7, 4–6
Canadian Open; Toronto, Canada; WTA 1000; Hard, outdoor; 2 August 2026 – 13 August 2026	–	1R	Bye			
Canadian Open; Toronto, Canada; WTA 1000; Hard, outdoor; 2 August 2026 – 13 August 2026	49	2R	(Czech Republic) Karolína Plíšková	66	Win	6–0, 6–2
Canadian Open; Toronto, Canada; WTA 1000; Hard, outdoor; 2 August 2026 – 13 August 2026	50	3R	(Canada) Leylah Fernandez	34	Loss	1–6, 4–6
Cincinnati Open; Cincinnati, United States; WTA 1000; Hard, outdoor; 13 August 2026 – 23 August 2026	–	1R	Bye			
Cincinnati Open; Cincinnati, United States; WTA 1000; Hard, outdoor; 13 August 2026 – 23 August 2026	51	2R	(Ukraine) Oleksandra Oliynykova	46	Win	6–1, 6–0
Cincinnati Open; Cincinnati, United States; WTA 1000; Hard, outdoor; 13 August 2026 – 23 August 2026	52	3R	(Indonesia) Janice Tjen (32)	37	Win	6–1, 7–6^{(7–5)}
Cincinnati Open; Cincinnati, United States; WTA 1000; Hard, outdoor; 13 August 2026 – 23 August 2026	53	4R	(Ukraine) Marta Kostyuk (10)	11	Loss	6–4, 0–6, 2–6
US Open; New York City, United States; Grand Slam; Hard, outdoor; 30 August 2026 – September 2026
US Open; New York City, United States; Grand Slam; Hard, outdoor; 30 August 2026 – September 2026	54	1R	(Indonesia) Janice Tjen	36	Win	6–2, 6–2
US Open; New York City, United States; Grand Slam; Hard, outdoor; 30 August 2026 – September 2026	55	2R	(Germany) Eva Lys	98	Win	6–0, 6–2
US Open; New York City, United States; Grand Slam; Hard, outdoor; 30 August 2026 – September 2026	56	3R	(Czech Republic) Nikola Bartunkova	34	Win	6–2, 7–6^{(7–5)}
US Open; New York City, United States; Grand Slam; Hard, outdoor; 30 August 2026 – September 2026	57	4R	(Austria) Anastasia Potapova (24)	25	Win	5–7, 6–4, 6–3
US Open; New York City, United States; Grand Slam; Hard, outdoor; 30 August 2026 – September 2026	58	QF	(United States) Coco Gauff (4)	4	Loss	6–2, 6–7^{(7–9)}, 2–6
Singapore Open; Singapore; WTA 500; Hard, indoor; 21 September 2026 – 27 September 2026	–	1R	Bye			
Singapore Open; Singapore; WTA 500; Hard, indoor; 21 September 2026 – 27 September 2026	59	2R	Aliaksandra Sasnovich	204	Win	6–2, 6–2
Singapore Open; Singapore; WTA 500; Hard, indoor; 21 September 2026 – 27 September 2026	60	3R	(Canada) Leylah Fernandez (6)	12	Loss	2–6, 5–7
China Open; Beijing, China; WTA 1000; Hard, outdoor; 30 September 2026 – 11 October 2026	–	1R	Bye			
China Open; Beijing, China; WTA 1000; Hard, outdoor; 30 September 2026 – 11 October 2026	61	2R	(China) Yue Yuan (WC)	135	Win	3–6, 6–0, 6–0
China Open; Beijing, China; WTA 1000; Hard, outdoor; 30 September 2026 – 11 October 2026	62	3R	(Uzbekistan) Polina Kudermetova	104	Win	6–4, 6–1
China Open; Beijing, China; WTA 1000; Hard, outdoor; 30 September 2026 – 11 October 2026	63	4R	(Ukraine) Daria Snigur	46	Win	6–2, 6–2
China Open; Beijing, China; WTA 1000; Hard, outdoor; 30 September 2026 – 11 October 2026	64	QF	Ekaterina Alexandrova	28	Win	7–6^{(7–4)}, 7–6^{(7–3)}
China Open; Beijing, China; WTA 1000; Hard, outdoor; 30 September 2026 – 11 October 2026	65	SF	(Czech Republic) Nikola Bartůňková	34	Win	6–2, 6–2
China Open; Beijing, China; WTA 1000; Hard, outdoor; 30 September 2026 – 11 October 2026	66	F	(China) Zheng Qinwen	51	Loss	5–7, 4–6
WTA Finals; Indian Wells, United States; Year-end championships; Hard, indoor; 8 November 2026 – 15 November 2026	67	RR	(Ukraine) Elina Svitolina (6)	6	Win	6–4, 6–0
WTA Finals; Indian Wells, United States; Year-end championships; Hard, indoor; 8 November 2026 – 15 November 2026	68	RR	Diana Shnaider (A)	11	Win	6–2, 6–1
WTA Finals; Indian Wells, United States; Year-end championships; Hard, indoor; 8 November 2026 – 15 November 2026	69	RR	Aryna Sabalenka (2)	2	Win	6–4, 6–0
WTA Finals; Indian Wells, United States; Year-end championships; Hard, indoor; 8 November 2026 – 15 November 2026	70	SF	(United States) Jessica Pegula (5)	5	Win	6–3, 6–4
WTA Finals; Indian Wells, United States; Year-end championships; Hard, indoor; 8 November 2026 – 15 November 2026	71	F	(Ukraine) Elina Svitolina (6)	6	Win	7–5, 6–3

== Schedule ==
This is Andreeva's current 2026 schedule (subject to change).

=== Singles schedule ===
Key
W	F	SF	QF	#R	RR

(W) winner; (F) finalist; (SF) semifinalist; (QF) quarterfinalist; (#R) rounds 4, 3, 2, 1; (RR) round-robin stage.

Date	Tournament	Location	Tier	Surface	Prev. result	Prev. points	New points	Result
4 January 2026 – 11 January 2026	Brisbane International	Australia	WTA 500	Hard	SF	195	108	Quarterfinals lost to. (Ukraine) Marta Kostyuk 3–6, 2–6
12 January 2026 – 18 January 2026	Adelaide International	Australia	WTA 500	Hard	A	0	500	Winner defeated (Canada) Victoria Mboko 6–3, 6–1
18 January 2026 – 1 February 2026	Australian Open	Australia	Grand Slam	Hard	4R	240	240	Fourth round lost to. (Ukraine) Elina Svitolina 2–6, 4–6
8 February 2026 – 14 February 2026	Qatar Open	Qatar	WTA 1000	Hard	2R	65	120	Third round lost to. (Canada) Victoria Mboko 3–6, 6–3, 6–7^{(5-7)}
15 February 2026 – 21 February 2026	Dubai Tennis Championships	UAE	WTA 1000	Hard	W	1000	215	Quarterfinals lost to. (United States) Amanda Anisimova 6–2, 5–7, 6–7^{(4-7)}
4 March 2026 – 16 March 2026	Indian Wells Open	United States	WTA 1000	Hard	W	1000	65	Third round lost to. (Czech Republic) Katerina Siniakova 6–4, 6–7^{(5-7)}, 3–6
17 March 2026 – 29 March 2026	Miami Open	United States	WTA 1000	Hard	3R	65	120	Fourth round lost to. (Canada) Victoria Mboko 6–7^{(4-7)}, 6–4, 0–6
6 April 2026 – 12 April 2026	Linz Open	Austria	WTA 500	Clay (i)	A	0	500	Winner defeated (Austria) Anastasia Potapova 1–6, 6–4, 6–3
13 April 2026 – 19 April 2026	Stuttgart Open	Germany	WTA 500	Clay (i)	2R	60	195	Semifinals defeated (Kazakhstan) Elena Rybakina 5–7, 1–6
21 April 2026 – 3 May 2026	Madrid Open	Spain	WTA 1000	Clay	QF	215	650	Final lost to. (Ukraine) Marta Kostyuk 3–6, 5–7
7 May 2026 – 18 May 2026	Italian Open	Italy	WTA 1000	Clay	QF	215	215	Quarterfinals lost to (United States) Coco Gauff 6–4, 2–6, 4–6
24 May 2026 – 7 June 2026	French Open	France	Grand Slam	Clay	QF	430	2000	Winner defeated (Poland) Maja Chwalinska 6–3, 6–2
Total year-end points						3,485	4,928	▲1,443

† Defending points from another tournament held in the same week.

== Yearly records ==
=== Head-to-head match-ups ===
Andreeva has a 49–15 (77%) WTA match win–loss record in the 2026 season. Her record against players who were part of the WTA rankings top ten at the time of their meetings is 1–5 (17%). Bold indicates player was ranked top 10 at the time of at least one meeting. The following list is ordered by number of wins:

- (Czech Republic) Marie Bouzková 3–0
- (Romania) Elena-Gabriela Ruse 2–0
- (Romania) Sorana Cîrstea 2–0
- (United States) Hailey Baptiste 1–0
- (Spain) Marina Bassols Ribera 1–0
- (Hungary) Anna Bondár 1–0
- (Poland) Maja Chwalińska 1–0
- (Romania) Jaqueline Cristian 1–0
- (Canada) Leylah Fernandez 1–2
- (France) Fiona Ferro 1–0
- (Australia) Olivia Gadecki 1–0
- (Hungary) Dalma Gálfi 1–0
- (Switzerland) Viktorija Golubic 1–0
- (Australia) Maya Joint 1–0
- (United States) McCartney Kessler 1–0
- (Poland) Magda Linette 1–0
- (Belgium) Elise Mertens 1–0
- (Czech Republic) Linda Nosková 1–0
- (Latvia) Jeļena Ostapenko 1–0
- (United States) Alycia Parks 1–0
- (Austria) Anastasia Potapova 1–0
- (Croatia) Antonia Ružić 1–0
- (Greece) Maria Sakkari 1–0
- (Argentina) Solana Sierra 1–0
- Diana Shnaider 1–0
- (United States) Sloane Stephens 1–0
- (Poland) **Iga Świątek** 1–0
- (Switzerland) Jil Teichmann 1–0
- (Hungary) Panna Udvardy 1–0
- (Croatia) Donna Vekić 1–0
- (Canada) **Victoria Mboko** 1–2
- (Ukraine) Marta Kostyuk 1–3
- (United States) **Amanda Anisimova** 0–1
- (United States) **Coco Gauff** 0–2
- (Kazakhstan) **Elena Rybakina** 0–1
- (Czech Republic) Kateřina Siniaková 0–1
- (Ukraine) Elina Svitolina 0–1
- Ekaterina Alexandrova1–1

=== Top 10 record ===
Result	W–L	Opponent	Rk	Tournament	Surface	Rd	Score	Rk	Ref
Loss	0–1	(United States) Amanda Anisimova	6	Dubai Tennis Championships, UAE	Hard	QF	6–2, 5–7, 6–7^{(4–7)}	7	
Loss	0–2	(Canada) Victoria Mboko	10	Miami Open, United States	Hard	4R	6–7^{(4–7)}, 6–4, 0–6	9	
Win	1–2	(Poland) Iga Świątek	4	Stuttgart Open, Germany	Clay (i)	QF	3–6, 6–4, 6–3	9	
Loss	1–3	(Kazakhstan) Elena Rybakina	2	Stuttgart Open, Germany	Clay (i)	SF	5–7, 1–6	9	
Loss	1–4	(United States) Coco Gauff	4	Italian Open, Italy	Clay	QF	6–4, 2–6, 4–6	7	
Loss	1–5	(United States) Coco Gauff	4	US Open, United States	Hard	QF	6–2, 6–7^{(7–9)}, 2–6	5	

- Key: (Rk) first use, opponent rank; (Rd) round; (Rk) 2nd use, player rank; (Ref) reference; (F) final; (SF) semifinal; (QF) quarterfinal; (#R) rounds 4, 3, 2, 1; (RR) round-robin stage; (Q#) qualifying rounds or stages (3), 2, 1.

=== Finals ===
==== Singles: 4 (3 titles, 1 runner-up) ====
Legend Grand Slam tournaments (1–0) WTA Tour Championships (0–0) WTA 1000 (0–1) WTA 500 (2–0)	Finals by surface Hard (1–1) Clay (2–0)	Finals by setting Outdoor (1–1) Indoor (1–0)

Result	W–L	Date	Tournament	Tier	Surface	Opponent	Score
Win	1–0	Jan 2026	Adelaide International, Australia	WTA 500	Hard	(Canada) Victoria Mboko	6–3, 6–1
Win	2–0	Apr 2026	Linz Open, Austria	WTA 500	Clay (i)	(Austria) Anastasia Potapova	1–6, 6–4, 6–3
Loss	2–1	Apr 2026	Madrid Open, Spain	WTA 1000	Clay	(Ukraine) Marta Kostyuk	3–6, 5–7
Win	3–1	May 2026	French Open, France	Grand Slam	Clay	(Poland) Maja Chwalińska	6–3, 6–2

=== Earnings ===
Tournaments Andreeva won are marked in boldface and tournaments where she finished are marked in italics.

#	Tournament	Singles Prize money	Doubles Prize money	Year-to-date
1.	Brisbane International	$37,640	$7,815	$45,455
2.	Adelaide International	**$185,500**	$0	$230,955
3.	Australian Open	$310,761	$0	$541,716
4.	Qatar Open	$49,250	$0	$590,966
5.	Dubai Open	$98,500	$0	$689,466
6.	Indian Wells Open	$47,375	$26,950	$763,791
7.	Miami Open	$105,720	$17,850	$887,361
8.	Linz Open	**$185,500**	$0	$1,072,861
9.	Stuttgart Open	$66,003	$0	$1,138,864
10.	Madrid Open	$535,585	$108,400	$1,782,849
11.	Italian Open	$154,210	**$189,540**	$2,126,599
12.	French Open	**$3,266,702**	$0	$5,393,301
**Total prize money**		**$5,042,746**	**$350,555**	**$5,393,301**

== See also ==
- 2026 WTA Tour
- Mirra Andreeva career statistics
- 2026 Elena Rybakina tennis season
- 2026 Aryna Sabalenka tennis season
