= Mirra Andreeva career statistics =

Career finals
Discipline	Type	Won	Lost	Total
Singles	Grand Slam	1	–	1
Singles	WTA Finals	1	–	1
Singles	WTA 1000	2	2	4
Singles	WTA 500	2	1	3
Singles	WTA 250	1	–	1
Singles	Olympics	–	–	–
Singles	Total	7	3	10
Doubles	Grand Slam	–	–	–
Doubles	WTA Finals	–	–	–
Doubles	WTA 1000	2	1	3
Doubles	WTA 500	1	–	1
Doubles	WTA 250	–	–	–
Doubles	Olympics	–	1	1
Doubles	Total	3	2	5

This is a list of the main career statistics of professional tennis player Mirra Andreeva. She has won a major at 2026 French Open. She also won the doubles silver medal at the 2024 Summer Olympics, partnering Diana Shnaider.

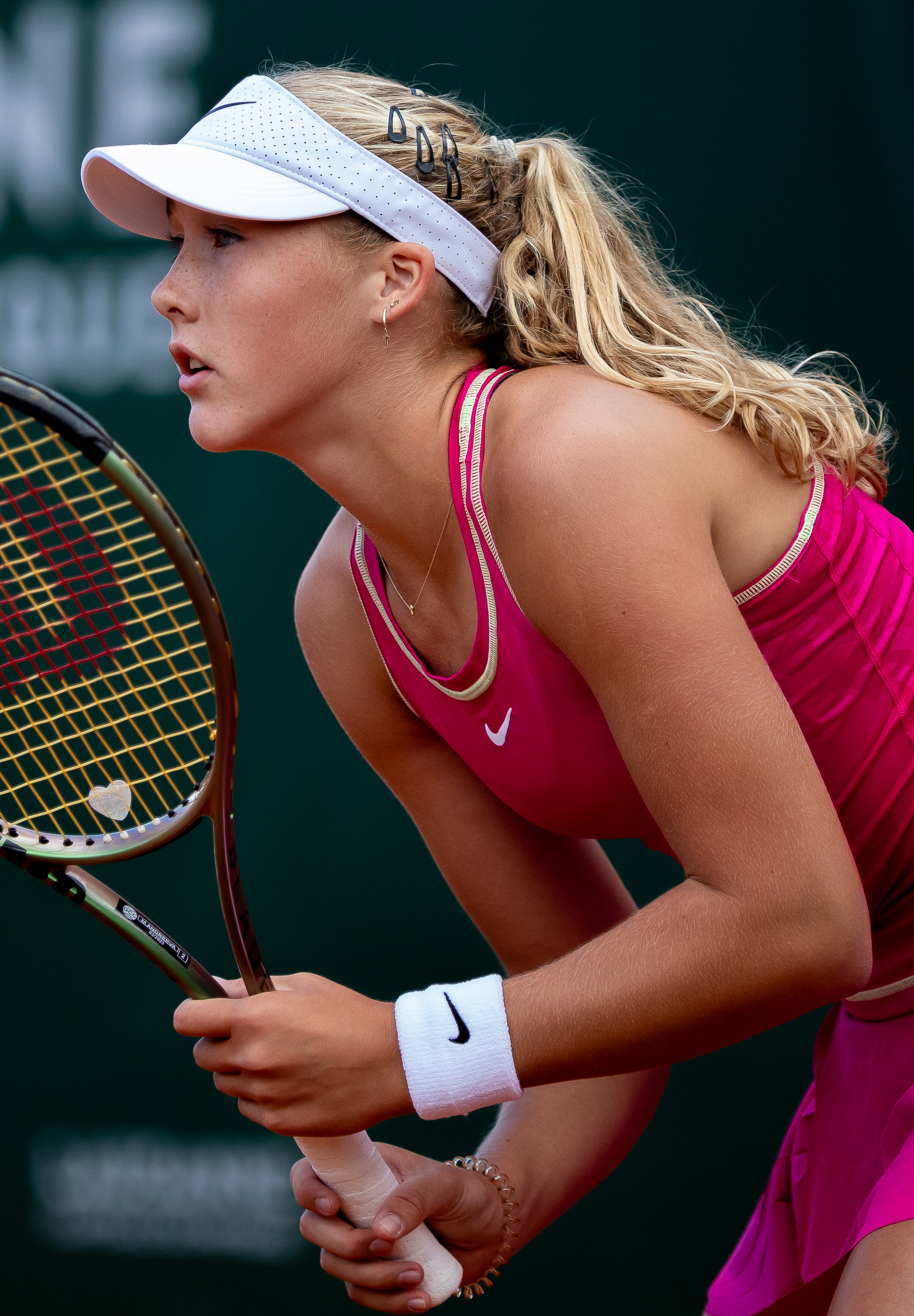
Andreeva at the 2023 Ladies Open Lausanne

== Performance timelines ==
Key
W	F	SF	QF	#R	RR	Q#	DNQ	A	NH

(W) winner; (F) finalist; (SF) semifinalist; (QF) quarterfinalist; (#R) rounds 4, 3, 2, 1; (RR) round-robin stage; (Q#) qualification round; (DNQ) did not qualify; (A) absent; (NH) not held; (SR) strike rate (events won / competed); (W–L) win–loss record.
To avoid confusion and double counting, these charts are updated at the conclusion of a tournament or when the player's participation has ended.

Only main-draw results in WTA Tour, Grand Slam tournaments, Billie Jean King Cup, United Cup, Hopman Cup and Olympic Games are included in win–loss records.

=== Singles ===
Current through the 2026 Cincinnati Open.

Tournament	2022	2023	2024	2025	2026	SR	W–L	Win %
Grand Slam tournaments
Australian Open	A	A	4R	4R	4R	0 / 3	9–3	75%
French Open	A	3R	SF	QF	W	1 / 4	18–3	86%
Wimbledon	A	4R	1R	QF	2R	0 / 4	8–4	67%
US Open	A	2R	2R	3R	QF	0 / 4	8–4	67%
Win–Loss	0–0	6–3	9–4	13–4	15–3	1 / 15	43–14	75%
Year-end championships
WTA Finals	Did Not Qualify			Alt	W	1 / 1	5–0	100%
National representation
Summer Olympics	Not Held		1R	Not Held		0 / 1	0–1	0%
WTA 1000 tournaments
Qatar Open	A	NTI	A	2R	3R	0 / 2	2–2	50%
Dubai Championships	NTI	A	1R	W	QF	1 / 3	7–2	78%
Indian Wells Open	A	A	1R	W	3R	1 / 3	7–2	78%
Miami Open	A	A	A	3R	4R	0 / 2	3–2	60%
Madrid Open	A	4R	QF	QF	F	0 / 4	15–4	79%
Italian Open	A	A	1R	QF	QF	0 / 3	6–3	67%
Canadian Open	A	A	A	3R	3R	0 / 2	1–2	33%
Cincinnati Open	A	A	QF	A	4R	0 / 2	5–2	71%
China Open	NH	3R	QF	4R	F	0 / 3	12–4	75%
Wuhan Open	Not Held		2R	2R	A	0 / 2	1–2	33%
Guadalajara Open	A	A	Not Tier I			0 / 0	0–0	–
Win–Loss	0–0	5–2	11–7	22–7	20–8	3 / 26	63–24	71%
Career statistics
	2022	2023	2024	2025	2026	SR	W–L	Win %
Tournaments	1	7	17	18	21	Career total: 64		
Titles	0	0	1	2	4	Career total: 7		
Finals	0	0	2	2	6	Career total: 10		
Hard win–loss	0–1	4–3	18–9	24–10	31–10	4 / 36	77–33	70%
Clay win–loss	0–0	6–3	16–5	11–4	22–3	3 / 18	55–15	79%
Grass win–loss	0–0	3–1	0–2	5–3	1–2	0 / 8	9–8	53%
Overall win–loss	0–1	13–7	34–16	40–17	55–16	7 / 64	142–57	71%
Win %	0%	65%	68%	70%	77%	Career total: 71%		
Year-end ranking	405	46	16	9	2	$13,188,655		

=== Doubles ===
Current through the 2026 Cincinnati Open.

Tournament	2023	2024	2025	2026	SR	W–L	Win %
Grand Slam tournaments
Australian Open	A	1R	SF	A	0 / 2	4–2	67%
French Open	A	QF	SF	A	0 / 2	7–2	78%
Wimbledon	A	1R	3R	A	0 / 2	2–2	50%
US Open	A	3R	QF	A	0 / 2	5–2	71%
Win–Loss	0–0	5–4	13–4	0–0	0 / 8	18–8	69%
National representation
Summer Olympics	NH	S	Not held		0 / 1	4–1	80%
WTA 1000 tournaments
Qatar Open	NTI	A	SF	A	0 / 1	3–1	75%
Dubai Championships	A	2R	A	A	0 / 1	1–1	50%
Indian Wells Open	A	A	1R	QF	0 / 2	2–2	50%
Miami Open	A	A	W	2R (Note: Withdraw during the tournament. Not counted as a loss.)	1 / 2	6–0	100%
Madrid Open	2R	2R	2R	F	0 / 4	7–4	64%
Italian Open	A	2R	SF	W	1 / 3	9–2	67%
Canadian Open	A	A	1R	1R	0 / 2	0–2	0%
Cincinnati Open	A	1R	A	A	0 / 1	0–1	0%
China Open	A	QF	1R	A	0 / 2	2–2	50%
Wuhan Open	NH	A	2R	A	0 / 1	0–1	0%
Win–Loss	1–1	5–5	12–7	12–3	2 / 19	30–16	65%
Career statistics
	2023	2024	2025	2026	SR	W–L	Win %
Tournaments	3	11	15	6	Career total: 35		
Titles	0	0	2	1	Career total: 3		
Finals	0	1	2	2	Career total: 5		
Hard win–loss	1–1	5–5	19–10	4–3	2 / 21	29–19	60%
Clay win–loss	1–2	9–4	8–3	9–1	0 / 11	27–10	73%
Grass win–loss	0–0	0–1	2–2	0–0	2 / 3	2–3	40%
Overall win–loss	2–3	14–10	29–15	13–4	4 / 35	58–32	64%
Year-end ranking	414	69	15				

== Grand Slam tournament finals ==
=== Singles: 1 (1 title) ===
Result	Year	Tournamaent	Surface	Opponent	Score
Win	2026	French Open	Clay	(Poland) Maja Chwalińska	6–3, 6–2

== Other significant finals ==
=== Year-end championships ===
==== Singles: 1 (title) ====
Result	Year	Tournament	Surface	Opponent	Score
Win	2026	WTA Finals, United States	Hard	(Ukraine) Elina Svitolina	7–5, 6–3

=== WTA 1000 tournaments ===
==== Singles: 4 (2 titles, 2 runner-ups) ====
Result	Year	Tournament	Surface	Opponent	Score
Win	2025	Dubai Championships	Hard	(Denmark) Clara Tauson	7–6^{(7–1)}, 6–1
Win	2025	Indian Wells Open	Hard	Aryna Sabalenka	2–6, 6–4, 6–3
Loss	2026	Madrid Open	Clay	(Ukraine) Marta Kostyuk	3–6, 5–7
Loss	2026	China Open	Hard	(China) Zheng Qinwen	5–7, 4–6

==== Doubles: 3 (2 titles, 1 runner-up) ====
Result	Year	Tournament	Surface	Partner	Opponents	Score
Win	2025	Miami Open	Hard	Diana Shnaider	(Spain) Cristina Bucșa (Japan) Miyu Kato	6–3, 6–7^{(5–7)}, [10–2]
Loss	2026	Madrid Open	Clay	Diana Shnaider	(Czech Republic) Kateřina Siniaková (United States) Taylor Townsend	6–7^{(2–7)}, 2–6
Win	2026	Italian Open	Clay	Diana Shnaider	(Spain) Cristina Bucșa (United States) Nicole Melichar-Martinez	6–3, 6–3

=== Summer Olympics ===
==== Doubles: 1 (silver medal) ====
Result	Year	Tournament	Surface	Partner	Opponents	Score
Silver	2024	Paris Olympics	Clay	Diana Shnaider	(Italy) Sara Errani (Italy) Jasmine Paolini	6–2, 1–6, [7–10]

== WTA Tour finals ==
=== Singles: 10 (7 titles, 3 runner-ups) ===
Legend Grand Slam (1–0) WTA Finals (1–0) WTA 1000 (2–2) WTA 500 (2–1) WTA 250 (1–0)	Finals by surface Hard (4–2) Clay (3–1)	Finals by setting Outdoor (6–3) Indoor (1–0)

Result	W–L	Date	Tournament	Tier	Surface	Opponent	Score
Win	1–0	Jul 2024	Iași Open, Romania	WTA 250	Clay	Elina Avanesyan	5–7, 7–5, 4–0 ret.
Loss	1–1	Oct 2024	Ningbo Open, China	WTA 500	Hard	Daria Kasatkina	0–6, 6–4, 4–6
Win	2–1	Feb 2025	Dubai Championships, UAE	WTA 1000	Hard	(Denmark) Clara Tauson	7–6^{(7–1)}, 6–1
Win	3–1	Mar 2025	Indian Wells Open, US	WTA 1000	Hard	Aryna Sabalenka	2–6, 6–4, 6–3
Win	4–1	Jan 2026	Adelaide International, Australia	WTA 500	Hard	(Canada) Victoria Mboko	6–3, 6–1
Win	5–1	Apr 2026	Linz Open, Austria	WTA 500	Clay (i)	(Austria) Anastasia Potapova	1–6, 6–4, 6–3
Loss	5–2	Apr 2026	Madrid Open, Spain	WTA 1000	Clay	(Ukraine) Marta Kostyuk	3–6, 5–7
Win	6–2	May 2026	French Open, France	Grand Slam	Clay	(Poland) Maja Chwalińska	6–3, 6–2
Loss	6–3	Oct 2026	China Open, China	WTA 1000	Hard	(China) Zheng Qinwen	5–7, 4–6
Win	7–3	Nov 2026	WTA Finals, Indian Wells	Finals	Hard	(Ukraine) Elina Svitolina	7–5, 6–3

=== Doubles: 5 (3 titles, 2 runner-ups) ===
Legend Olympics (0–1) WTA 1000 (2–1) WTA 500 (1–0)	Finals by surface Hard (2–0) Clay (1–2)	Finals by setting Outdoor (2–2)

Result	W–L	Date	Tournament	Tier	Surface	Partner	Opponents	Score
Loss	0–1	Aug 2024	Summer Olympics, Paris	Olympics	Clay	Diana Shnaider	(Italy) Sara Errani (Italy) Jasmine Paolini	6–2, 1–6, [7–10]
Win	1–1	Jan 2025	Brisbane International, Australia	WTA 500	Hard	Diana Shnaider	(Australia) Priscilla Hon; Anna Kalinskaya	7–6^{(8–6)}, 7–5
Win	2–1	Mar 2025	Miami Open, US	WTA 1000	Hard	Diana Shnaider	(Spain) Cristina Bucșa (Japan) Miyu Kato	6–3, 6–7^{(5–7)}, [10–2]
Loss	2–2	Apr 2026	Madrid Open, Spain	WTA 1000	Clay	Diana Shnaider	(Czech Republic) Kateřina Siniaková (United States) Taylor Townsend	6–7^{(2–7)}, 2–6
Win	3–2	May 2026	Italian Open	WTA 1000	Clay	Diana Shnaider	(Spain) Cristina Bucșa (United States) Nicole Melichar-Martinez	6–3, 6–3

== ITF Circuit finals ==
=== Singles: 7 (6 titles, 1 runner-up) ===
Legend W60 tournaments (3–0) W25 tournaments (1–0) W15 tournaments (2–1)	Finals by surface Hard (2–1) Clay (4–0)

Result	W–L	Date	Tournament	Tier	Surface	Opponent	Score
Loss	0–1	Feb 2022	ITF Sharm El Sheikh, Egypt	W15	Hard	(Hong Kong) Cody Wong	4–6, 1–6
Win	1–1	Apr 2022	ITF Antalya, Turkey	W15	Clay	(Italy) Martina Colmegna	6–7^{(6–8)}, 6–0, 6–2
Win	2–1	Apr 2022	ITF Antalya, Turkey	W15	Clay	(Germany) Silvia Ambrosio	7–5, 6–2
Win	3–1	Jul 2022	ITF El Espinar, Spain	W25	Hard	(Spain) Eva Guerrero Álvarez	6–4, 6–2
Win	4–1	Nov 2022	Meitar Open, Israel	W60	Hard	(Sweden) Rebecca Peterson	6–1, 6–4
Win	5–1	Apr 2023	Chiasso Open, Switzerland	W60	Clay	(Switzerland) Céline Naef	1–6, 7–6^{(7–3)}, 6–0
Win	6–1	Apr 2023	Bellinzona Ladies Open, Switzerland	W60	Clay	(France) Fiona Ferro	2–6, 6–1, 6–4

== ITF Junior Circuit ==
=== Junior Grand Slam finals ===
==== Singles: 1 (runner-up) ====
Result	Year	Tournament	Surface	Opponent	Score
Loss	2023	Australian Open	Hard	Alina Korneeva	7–6^{(7–2)}, 4–6, 5–7

== WTA career earnings ==
- Grand Slam titles, WTA titles, Total titles – includes singles, doubles and mixed doubles titles.

Year	Grand Slam titles	WTA titles	Total titles	Earnings ($)	Money list rank
2022	0	0	0	15,997	542
2023	0	0	0	750,477	59
2024	0	1	1	1,924,659	17
2025	0	4	4	4,726,226	8
2026	1	3	4	5,643,523	2
Career	1	8	9	13,188,655	57

== Career Grand Slam tournament statistics ==
=== Best Grand Slam tournament result details ===
Tournament winners are in boldface, and runners-up are in italics.

French Open
2026 (8th)
Round	Opponent	Rank	Score
1R	(France) Fiona Ferro (WC)	181	6–3, 6–3
2R	(Spain) Marina Bassols Ribera (Q)	175	3–6, 6–1, 6–1
3R	(Czech Republic) Marie Bouzkova (27)	28	6–4, 6–2
4R	(Switzerland) Jil Teichmann (PR)	170	6–1, 6–3
QF	(Romania) Sorana Cirstea (18)	18	6–3, 6–2
SF	(Ukraine) Marta Kostyuk (15)	15	6–1, 6–3
**W**	(Poland) Maja Chwalinska (Q)	114	6–3, 6–2

=== Seedings ===
The tournaments won by Andreeva are in boldface, and advanced into finals by Andreeva are in italics.

Legend seeded No. 2 (0 / 0) seeded No. 3 (0 / 0) seeded No. 4–10 (1 / 7) seeded No. 11–32 (0 / 3) unseeded (0 / 5)	Longest streak 0 0 7 3 5

Year	Australian Open	French Open	Wimbledon	US Open
2023	did not play	unseeded	unseeded	unseeded
2024	unseeded	unseeded	24th	21st
2025	14th	6th	7th	5th
2026	8th	**8th**	5th	5th

== Wins against top 10 players ==
- Andreeva has a 15–16 record against players who were, at the time the match was played, ranked in the top 10.

Season	2024	2025	2026	Total
Wins	4	6	5	15

No.	Player	Rk	Event	Surface	Rd	Score	Rk	Ref
2024
1.	(Tunisia) Ons Jabeur	6	Australian Open, Australia	Hard	2R	6–0, 6–2	47	
2.	(Czech Republic) Markéta Vondroušová	7	Madrid Open, Spain	Clay	3R	7–5, 6–1	43	
3.	Aryna Sabalenka	2	French Open, France	Clay	QF	6–7^{(5–7)}, 6–4, 6–4	38	
4.	(Italy) Jasmine Paolini	5	Cincinnati Open, United States	Hard	3R	7–6^{(7–4)}, 6–1	24	
2025
5.	(Poland) Iga Świątek	2	Dubai Championships, UAE	Hard	QF	6–3, 6–3	14	
6.	(Kazakhstan) Elena Rybakina	7	Dubai Championships, UAE	Hard	SF	6–4, 4–6, 6–3	14	
7.	(Kazakhstan) Elena Rybakina	7	Indian Wells Open, United States	Hard	4R	6–1, 6–2	11	
8.	(Poland) Iga Świątek	2	Indian Wells Open, United States	Hard	SF	7–6^{(7–1)}, 1–6, 6–3	11	
9.	Aryna Sabalenka	1	Indian Wells Open, United States	Hard	F	2–6, 6–4, 6–3	11	
10.	(United States) Emma Navarro	10	Wimbledon, United Kingdom	Grass	4R	6–2, 6–3	7	
2026
11.	(Poland) Iga Świątek	4	Stuttgart Open, Germany	Clay (i)	QF	3–6, 6–4, 6–3	9	
12.	(Ukraine) Elina Svitolina	6	WTA Finals, Indian Wells	Hard	RR	6–4, 6–0	3	
13.	Aryna Sabalenka	2	WTA Finals, Indian Wells	Hard	RR	6–4, 6–0	3	
14.	(United States) Jessica Pegula	5	WTA Finals, Indian Wells	Hard	SF	6–3, 6–4	3	
15.	(Ukraine) Elina Svitolina	6	WTA Finals, Indian Wells	Hard	F	7–5, 6–3	3	

- Key: (Rk) first use, opponent rank; (Rd) round; (Rk) 2nd use, player rank; (Ref) reference; (F) final; (SF) semifinal; (QF) quarterfinal; (#R) rounds 4, 3, 2, 1; (RR) round-robin stage; (Q#) qualifying rounds or stages (3), 2, 1.

== Longest winning streaks ==
=== 13-match winning streak (2025) ===
#	Tournament	Tier	Start date	Surface	Rd	Opponent	Rk	Score
–	Qatar Open	WTA 1000	February 9, 2025	Hard	2R	(Slovakia) Rebecca Šramková	46	6–3, 3–6, 5–7
1	Dubai Tennis Championships	WTA 1000	February 16, 2025	Hard	1R	(Armenia) Elina Avanesyan	44	6–2, 6–1
2	Dubai Tennis Championships	WTA 1000	February 16, 2025	Hard	2R	(Czech Republic) Markéta Vondroušová	39	7–5, 6–0
3	Dubai Tennis Championships	WTA 1000	February 16, 2025	Hard	3R	(United States) Peyton Stearns	46	6–1, 6–1
4	Dubai Tennis Championships	WTA 1000	February 16, 2025	Hard	QF	(Poland) Iga Świątek (2)	2	6–3, 6–3
5	Dubai Tennis Championships	WTA 1000	February 16, 2025	Hard	SF	(Kazakhstan) Elena Rybakina (6)	7	6–4, 4–6, 6–3
6	Dubai Tennis Championships	WTA 1000	February 16, 2025	Hard	W	(Denmark) Clara Tauson	38	7–6^{(7–1)}, 6–1
7	Indian Wells Open	WTA 1000	March 5, 2025	Hard	2R	(France) Varvara Gracheva	70	7–5, 6–4
8	Indian Wells Open	WTA 1000	March 5, 2025	Hard	3R	(Denmark) Clara Tauson (22)	21	6–3, 6–0
9	Indian Wells Open	WTA 1000	March 5, 2025	Hard	4R	(Kazakhstan) Elena Rybakina (7)	7	6–1, 6–2
10	Indian Wells Open	WTA 1000	March 5, 2025	Hard	QF	(Ukraine) Elina Svitolina (23)	23	7–5, 6–3
11	Indian Wells Open	WTA 1000	March 5, 2025	Hard	SF	(Poland) Iga Świątek (2)	2	7–6^{(7–1)}, 1–6, 6–3
12	Indian Wells Open	WTA 1000	March 5, 2025	Hard	W	Aryna Sabalenka (1)	1	2–6, 6–4, 6–3
13	Miami Open	WTA 1000	March 18, 2025	Hard	2R	Veronika Kudermetova	52	6–0, 6–2
–	Miami Open	WTA 1000	March 18, 2025	Hard	3R	(United States) Amanda Anisimova (17)	17	6–7^{(5–7)}, 6–2, 3–6

== Exhibition matches ==
=== Singles ===
Result	Date	Tournament	Surface	Opponent	Score
Win	Jan 2024	Kooyong Classic, Australia	Hard	(United States) Danielle Collins	7–6(5), 6–1
