= 2026 Upper Austria Ladies Linz – Doubles =

Doubles
- 2026 Upper Austria Ladies Linz

Final
- Champions: (Romania) Sorana Cîrstea (China) Zhang Shuai
- Runners-up: (Czech Republic) Jesika Malečková (Czech Republic) Miriam Škoch
- Score: 6–3, 6–2

Details
- Draw: 16
- Seeds: 4

Events
Singles	Doubles
- Linz Open

Sorana Cîrstea and Zhang Shuai defeated Jesika Malečková and Miriam Škoch in the final, 6–3, 6–2 to win the doubles tennis title at the 2026 Upper Austria Ladies Linz.

Tímea Babos and Luisa Stefani were the reigning champions, but Babos retired from the sport in January 2026, and Stefani chose not to compete.

== Seeds ==
1. (Romania) Sorana Cîrstea / (China) Zhang Shuai (champions)
2. Alexandra Panova / (Chinese Taipei) Wu Fang-hsien (first round)
3. Irina Khromacheva / (Mexico) Giuliana Olmos (first round)
4. (Norway) Ulrikke Eikeri / (United States) Quinn Gleason (semifinals)

== Draw ==
Key

- Q = Qualifier
- WC = Wild card
- LL = Lucky loser
- Alt = Alternate
- ITF = ITF entry
- PR = Protected ranking
- SR = Special ranking
- SE = Special exempt
- JE = Junior exempt
- JR = Junior Accelerator Programme entrant
- CO = College Accelerator Programme entrant
- NG = Next Gen Accelerator Program entrant
- w/o = Walkover
- r = Retired
- d = Defaulted

=== Draw ===
First round
1	(Romania) S Cîrstea (China) S Zhang	6	6
(United States) S Stephens (United States) K Volynets	1	3
M Kozyreva; I Shymanovich	2	2
(Japan) M Kato; L Samsonova	6	6
4	(Norway) U Eikeri (United States) Q Gleason	6	6^{5}	[12]
(Austria) A Potapova (Austria) L Tagger	3	7^{7}	[10]
(Germany) A-L Friedsam (Germany) T Maria	6	3	[10]
(Czech Republic) A Dețiuc (Netherlands) I Haverlag	2	6	[7]
(United Kingdom) M Lumsden (Japan) M Ninomiya	6	7^{7}
(Poland) K Piter (China) Q Tang	2	6^{2}
(Chinese Taipei) E-s Liang (China) Z Yang	7	3	[10]
3	I Khromacheva (Mexico) G Olmos	5	6	[6]
WC	(Austria) J Grabher (Austria) S Kraus	6	6
(Romania) J Cristian (Latvia) J Ostapenko	4	3
(Czech Republic) J Malečková (Czech Republic) M Škoch	6	2	[10]
2	A Panova (Chinese Taipei) F-h Wu	4	6	[7]

Quarterfinals
1	(Romania) S Cîrstea (China) S Zhang	6	6
(Japan) M Kato; L Samsonova	3	2
4	(Norway) U Eikeri (United States) Q Gleason	6	6
(Germany) A-L Friedsam (Germany) T Maria	0	3
(United Kingdom) M Lumsden (Japan) M Ninomiya	2	3
(Chinese Taipei) E-s Liang (China) Z Yang	6	6
WC	(Austria) J Grabher (Austria) S Kraus	6	2	[6]
(Czech Republic) J Malečková (Czech Republic) M Škoch	3	6	[10]

Semifinals
1	(Romania) S Cîrstea (China) S Zhang	7	6
4	(Norway) U Eikeri (United States) Q Gleason	5	2
(Chinese Taipei) E-s Liang (China) Z Yang	7	5	[4]
(Czech Republic) J Malečková (Czech Republic) M Škoch	5	7	[10]

Final
1	(Romania) S Cîrstea (China) S Zhang	6	6
(Czech Republic) J Malečková (Czech Republic) M Škoch	3	2
