= 2026 Upper Austria Ladies Linz =

- Date: 6–12 April
- Edition: 35th
- Category: WTA 500
- Draw: 28S / 16D
- Prize money: €1,049,083
- Surface: Clay / indoor
- Location: Linz, Austria
- Venue: Design Center Linz

Champions

Singles
- Mirra Andreeva

Doubles
- (Romania) Sorana Cîrstea / (China) Zhang Shuai
- Linz Open

The 2026 Upper Austria Ladies Linz was a professional women's tennis tournament played on indoor clay courts. It was the 35th edition of the tournament, and part of the WTA 500 tournaments of the 2026 WTA Tour. It was held at the Design Center Linz in Linz, Austria, from 6 to 12 April 2026. This was the first year that the tournament was being held on clay courts. First-seeded Mirra Andreeva won the singles title.

== Champions ==
=== Singles ===
- Mirra Andreeva def. (Austria) Anastasia Potapova, 1–6, 6–4, 6–3

=== Doubles ===
- (Romania) Sorana Cîrstea / (China) Zhang Shuai def. (Czech Republic) Jesika Malečková / (Czech Republic) Miriam Škoch, 6–3, 6–2

== Points and prize money ==
=== Point distribution ===
Event	W	F	SF	QF	R16	R32	Q	Q2	Q1
Singles	500	325	195	108	60	1	25	13	1
Doubles	500	325	195	108	1	—N/a	—N/a	—N/a	—N/a

=== Prize money ===
Event	W	F	SF	QF	Round of 16	Round of 32	Q2	Q1
Singles	€161,310	€99,565	€57,395	€30,435	€15,690	€11,309	€9,130	€5,505
Doubles	€53,510	€32,520	€18,890	€9,700	€5,910	—N/a	—N/a	—N/a
Doubles prize money per team

== Singles entrants ==
=== Seeds ===
Country	Player	Rank^{1}	Seed
	Mirra Andreeva	10	1
	Ekaterina Alexandrova	13	2
	Liudmila Samsonova	21	3
LAT	Jeļena Ostapenko	23	4
ROU	Sorana Cîrstea	29	5
ROU	Jaqueline Cristian	35	6
USA	Ann Li	37	7
~~CZE~~	~~Sára Bejlek~~	~~40~~	~~8~~

- Rankings as of 30 March 2026

=== Other entrants ===
The following players received wildcards into the singles main draw:

- (Spain) Paula Badosa
- (Austria) Sinja Kraus
- (United States) Sloane Stephens
- (Austria) Lilli Tagger

The following player received entry as a Top 30 replacement player into the singles main draw:

- Mirra Andreeva

The following player received entry using a protected ranking:

- (Czech Republic) Karolína Plíšková

The following players received entry from the qualifying draw:

- (Germany) Tamara Korpatsch
- Aliaksandra Sasnovich
- (Croatia) Donna Vekić
- (United States) Katie Volynets

The following player received entry as a lucky loser:

- (Ukraine) Anhelina Kalinina

=== Withdrawals ===
- (Czech Republic) Sára Bejlek → replaced by (Ukraine) Anhelina Kalinina
- (Australia) Daria Kasatkina → replaced by (Hungary) Panna Udvardy
- (Czech Republic) Barbora Krejčíková → replaced by (Romania) Elena-Gabriela Ruse
- (United States) Emma Navarro → replaced by Mirra Andreeva
- (United Kingdom) Emma Raducanu → replaced by (Austria) Julia Grabher
- (Croatia) Antonia Ružić → replaced by (United Kingdom) Katie Boulter
- (Denmark) Clara Tauson → replaced by (United States) Alycia Parks
- (Czech Republic) Markéta Vondroušová → replaced by (Austria) Anastasia Potapova

== Doubles entrants ==
=== Seeds ===
Country	Player	Country	Player	Rank^{1}	Seed
ROU	Sorana Cîrstea	CHN	Zhang Shuai	66	1
	Alexandra Panova	TPE	Wu Fang-hsien	70	2
	Irina Khromacheva	MEX	Giuliana Olmos	83	3
NOR	Ulrikke Eikeri	USA	Quinn Gleason	89	4

- ^{1}Rankings as of 30 March 2026

=== Other entrants ===
The following pair received a wildcard into the doubles main draw:

- (Austria) Julia Grabher / (Austria) Sinja Kraus
