= 2026 WTA Finals – Singles =

Singles
- 2026 WTA Finals

Final
- Champion: Mirra Andreeva
- Runner-up: (Ukraine) Elina Svitolina
- Score: 7–5, 6–3
- Date: 15 November 2026

Details
- Draw: 8 (round robin + elimination)
- Seeds: 8

Events
Singles	Doubles
- WTA Finals

At the 2026 WTA Finals, Mirra Andreeva defeated Elina Svitolina in the final, 7–5, 6–3 to win the singles tennis title. The tournament was played on outdoor hard courts at Indian Wells, California, US. Andreeva was the youngest player to win the WTA Finals since Maria Sharapova in 2004, the first to win the title without losing a set since Iga Świątek in 2023, and first to win the title on tournament debut since Ashleigh Barty in 2019. This also marked the first time since 2021, and the eighth time overall, in which the final was a rematch of a match that occurred in the round-robin stage (won by Andreeva).

Elena Rybakina was the reigning champion, but withdrew before the tournament due to illness. She was replaced by first alternate Marta Kostyuk. This marked the first time since 2021 in which the incumbent world No. 1 did not participate at the tournament, and the first time since 2023 in which the reigning champion did not participate.

This was the sixth consecutive appearance of Aryna Sabalenka at the event, while Coco Gauff and Jessica Pegula made their fifth consecutive appearances. Andreeva, Karolína Muchová, Linda Nosková, Kostyuk, and Diana Shnaider (as an alternate) made their debuts in the singles competition. Former champion Svitolina made her first appearance since 2019. Muchová withdrew from the tournament before her final round-robin match due to illness and was replaced by second alternate Shnaider.

== Seeds ==
1. (Kazakhstan) Elena Rybakina (withdrew due to illness)
2. Aryna Sabalenka (round robin)
3. Mirra Andreeva (champion)
4. (United States) Coco Gauff (round robin)
5. (United States) Jessica Pegula (semifinals)
6. (Ukraine) Elina Svitolina (final)
7. (Czech Republic) Karolína Muchová (round robin, withdrew)
8. (Czech Republic) Linda Nosková (semifinals)
9. (Ukraine) Marta Kostyuk (round robin)

== Alternates ==
1. Diana Shnaider (round robin, replaced Muchová)

== Draw ==
Key

- Q = Qualifier
- WC = Wild card
- LL = Lucky loser
- Alt = Alternate
- ITF = ITF entry
- PR = Protected ranking
- SR = Special ranking
- SE = Special exempt
- JE = Junior exempt
- JR = Junior Accelerator Programme entrant
- CO = College Accelerator Programme entrant
- NG = Next Gen Accelerator Program entrant
- w/o = Walkover
- r = Retired
- d = Defaulted

=== Finals ===
Semifinals
8	(Czech Republic) Linda Nosková	2	1
6	(Ukraine) Elina Svitolina	6	6
5	(United States) Jessica Pegula	3	4
3	Mirra Andreeva	6	6

Final
6	(Ukraine) Elina Svitolina	5	3
3	Mirra Andreeva	7	6

=== Group 1 ===
		(United States) Gauff	(United States) Pegula	(Czech Republic) Nosková	(Ukraine) Kostyuk	RR; W–L	Set; W–L	Game; W–L	Standings
4	(United States) Coco Gauff		6–4, 6–7^{(5–7)}, 6–2	3–6, 3–6	6–4, 7–5	2–1	4–3 (57%)	37–34 (52%)	3
5	(United States) Jessica Pegula	4–6, 7–6^{(7–5)}, 2–6		7–6^{(7–2)}, 4–6, 7–5	6–2, 7–5	2–1	5–3 (63%)	44–42 (51%)	2
8	(Czech Republic) Linda Nosková	6–3, 6–3	6–7^{(2–7)}, 6–4, 5–7		6–2, 6–4	2–1	5–2 (71%)	41–30 (58%)	1
9	(Ukraine) Marta Kostyuk	4–6, 5–7	2–6, 5–7	2–6, 4–6		0–3	0–6 (0%)	22–38 (37%)	4

=== Group 2 ===
		Sabalenka	Andreeva	(Ukraine) Svitolina	(Czech Republic) Muchová; Shnaider	RR; W–L	Set; W–L	Game; W–L	Standings
2	Aryna Sabalenka		4–6, 0–6	3–6, 6–3, 1–6	7–6^{(7–2)}, 7–5 (w/ Muchová)	1–2	3–4 (43%)	28–38 (42%)	3
3	Mirra Andreeva	6–4, 6–0		6–4, 6–0	6–2, 6–1 (w/ Shnaider)	3–0	6–0 (100%)	36–11 (77%)	1
6	(Ukraine) Elina Svitolina	6–3, 3–6, 6–1	4–6, 0–6		3–6, 6–2, 6–2 (w/ Muchová)	2–1	4–4 (50%)	34–32 (52%)	2
7; 10	(Czech Republic) Karolína Muchová; Diana Shnaider	6–7^{(2–7)}, 5–7 (w/ Muchová)	(w/ Shnaider); 2–6, 1–6	6–3, 2–6, 2–6 (w/ Muchová)		0–2; 0–1	1–4 (20%); 0–2 (0%)	21–29 (42%); 3–12 (20%)	X 4

Standings are determined by: 1. number of wins; 2. number of matches; 3. in two-player ties, head-to-head records; 4. in three-player ties, (a) percentage of sets won (head-to-head records if two players remain tied), then (b) percentage of games won (head-to-head records if two players remain tied).
