= 2026 Mutua Madrid Open – Women's doubles =

Women's doubles
- 2026 Mutua Madrid Open

Final
- Champions: (Czech Republic) Kateřina Siniaková (United States) Taylor Townsend
- Runners-up: Mirra Andreeva; Diana Shnaider
- Score: 7–6^{(7–2)}, 6–2

Details
- Draw: 32
- Seeds: 8

Events
Singles	men	women
Doubles	men	women
- Mutua Madrid Open

Kateřina Siniaková and Taylor Townsend defeated Mirra Andreeva and Diana Shnaider in the final, 7–6^{(7–2)}, 6–2 to win the women's doubles tennis title at the 2026 Madrid Open. It was the ninth WTA 1000 title for Siniaková and fifth for Townsend, and their third consecutive WTA 1000 title as a team.

Siniaková regained the WTA No. 1 doubles ranking from Elise Mertens after reaching the semifinals. The pair of Sara Errani and Jasmine Paolini were also in contention for the top ranking at the beginning of the tournament.

Sorana Cîrstea and Anna Kalinskaya were the reigning champions, but withdrew before the first round due to Kalinskaya's calf injury.

== Seeds ==
1. (Italy) Sara Errani / (Italy) Jasmine Paolini (second round)
2. (Czech Republic) Kateřina Siniaková / (United States) Taylor Townsend (champions)
3. (Belgium) Elise Mertens / (China) Zhang Shuai (second round)
4. (Latvia) Jeļena Ostapenko / (New Zealand) Erin Routliffe (first round)
5. (Kazakhstan) Anna Danilina / (United States) Asia Muhammad (first round)
6. (Spain) Cristina Bucșa / (United States) Nicole Melichar-Martinez (second round)
7. (Chinese Taipei) Hsieh Su-wei / (United States) Sofia Kenin (quarterfinals)
8. (Australia) Ellen Perez / (Netherlands) Demi Schuurs (quarterfinals)

== Draw ==
Key

- Q = Qualifier
- WC = Wild card
- LL = Lucky loser
- Alt = Alternate
- ITF = ITF entry
- PR = Protected ranking
- SR = Special ranking
- SE = Special exempt
- JE = Junior exempt
- JR = Junior Accelerator Programme entrant
- CO = College Accelerator Programme entrant
- NG = Next Gen Accelerator Program entrant
- w/o = Walkover
- r = Retired
- d = Defaulted

=== Finals ===
Semifinals
(Germany) Laura Siegemund; Vera Zvonareva	3	2
Mirra Andreeva; Diana Shnaider	6	6
(Serbia) Aleksandra Krunić (France) Kristina Mladenovic	4	5
2	(Czech Republic) Kateřina Siniaková (United States) Taylor Townsend	6	7

Final
Mirra Andreeva; Diana Shnaider	6^{2}	2
2	(Czech Republic) Kateřina Siniaková (United States) Taylor Townsend	7^{7}	6

=== Top half ===
First round
1	(Italy) S Errani (Italy) J Paolini	7	7^{7}
(Ukraine) N Kichenok (Japan) M Ninomiya	5	6^{2}
(Germany) L Siegemund; V Zvonareva	6	6
(United States) I Jovic (Canada) V Mboko	2	4
(Ukraine) M Kostyuk (Denmark) C Tauson	3	6^{1}
(Indonesia) A Sutjiadi (Indonesia) J Tjen	6	7^{7}
(Japan) E Hozumi (Chinese Taipei) F-h Wu	2	4
6	(Spain) C Bucșa (United States) N Melichar-Martinez	6	6
3	(Belgium) E Mertens (China) S Zhang	6	3	[10]
Alt	(United States) C McNally (United States) J Pegula	2	6	[7]
(Czech Republic) A Dețiuc (Poland) K Piter	4	0
M Andreeva; D Shnaider	6	6
(Japan) M Kato; L Samsonova
M Kozyreva (Czech Republic) M Škoch	w/o
A Panova (China) Z Yang	2	6^{8}
8	(Australia) E Perez (Netherlands) D Schuurs	6	7^{10}

Second round
1	(Italy) S Errani (Italy) J Paolini	6	4	[6]
(Germany) L Siegemund; V Zvonareva	4	6	[10]
(Indonesia) A Sutjiadi (Indonesia) J Tjen	6	6
6	(Spain) C Bucșa (United States) N Melichar-Martinez	4	2
3	(Belgium) E Mertens (China) S Zhang	5	3
M Andreeva; D Shnaider	7	6
M Kozyreva (Czech Republic) M Škoch	3	0
8	(Australia) E Perez (Netherlands) D Schuurs	6	6

Quarterfinals
(Germany) L Siegemund; V Zvonareva	5	7	[10]
(Indonesia) A Sutjiadi (Indonesia) J Tjen	7	5	[8]
M Andreeva; D Shnaider	6	6
8	(Australia) E Perez (Netherlands) D Schuurs	3	3

Semifinals
(Germany) L Siegemund; V Zvonareva	3	2
M Andreeva; D Shnaider	6	6

=== Bottom half ===
First round
7	(Chinese Taipei) S-w Hsieh (United States) S Kenin	6	6
(Slovakia) T Mihalíková (United Kingdom) O Nicholls	2	3
(China) X Jiang (China) Y Xu	6	3	[7]
WC	(United Kingdom) K Boulter (United States) V Williams	4	6	[10]
(Uzbekistan) K Rakhimova (Czech Republic) A Sisková	2	3
(Serbia) A Krunić (France) K Mladenovic	6	6
(Czech Republic) M Bouzková (Czech Republic) L Nosková	6^{2}	7	[10]
4	(Latvia) J Ostapenko (New Zealand) E Routliffe	7^{7}	5	[6]
5	(Kazakhstan) A Danilina (United States) A Muhammad	2	1
(Norway) U Eikeri (United States) Q Gleason	6	6
WC	(United States) C Gauff (United States) R Montgomery	6	6
I Khromacheva (Mexico) G Olmos	3	4
WC	(Philippines) A Eala (Turkey) Z Sönmez	6	6
(Chinese Taipei) H-c Chan (Hungary) F Stollár	2	2
(Ukraine) L Kichenok (United States) D Krawczyk	6	1	[8]
2	(Czech Republic) K Siniaková (United States) T Townsend	3	6	[10]

Second round
7	(Chinese Taipei) S-w Hsieh (United States) S Kenin	6	6
WC	(United Kingdom) K Boulter (United States) V Williams	4	4
(Serbia) A Krunić (France) K Mladenovic	3	7	[11]
(Czech Republic) M Bouzková (Czech Republic) L Nosková	6	5	[9]
(Norway) U Eikeri (United States) Q Gleason	w/o
WC	(United States) C Gauff (United States) R Montgomery
WC	(Philippines) A Eala (Turkey) Z Sönmez	1	5
2	(Czech Republic) K Siniaková (United States) T Townsend	6	7

Quarterfinals
7	(Chinese Taipei) S-w Hsieh (United States) S Kenin	6	4	[4]
(Serbia) A Krunić (France) K Mladenovic	3	6	[10]
(Norway) U Eikeri (United States) Q Gleason	6^{4}	1
2	(Czech Republic) K Siniaková (United States) T Townsend	7^{7}	6

Semifinals
(Serbia) A Krunić (France) K Mladenovic	4	5
2	(Czech Republic) K Siniaková (United States) T Townsend	6	7

== Seeded teams ==
The following are the seeded teams. Seedings are based on WTA rankings as of 13 April 2026.

Country	Player	Country	Player	Rank	Seed
ITA	Sara Errani	ITA	Jasmine Paolini	6	1
CZE	Kateřina Siniaková	USA	Taylor Townsend	7	2
BEL	Elise Mertens	CHN	Zhang Shuai	12	3
LAT	Jeļena Ostapenko	NZL	Erin Routliffe	26	4
KAZ	Anna Danilina	USA	Asia Muhammad	30	5
ESP	Cristina Bucșa	USA	Nicole Melichar-Martinez	35	6
TPE	Hsieh Su-wei	USA	Sofia Kenin	42	7
AUS	Ellen Perez	NED	Demi Schuurs	42	8

== Other entry information ==
=== Wildcards ===
- (United Kingdom) Katie Boulter / (United States) Venus Williams
- (Philippines) Alexandra Eala / (Turkey) Zeynep Sönmez
- (United States) Coco Gauff / (United States) Robin Montgomery

=== Alternates ===
- (United States) Caty McNally / (United States) Jessica Pegula

=== Withdrawals ===
- (Romania) Sorana Cîrstea / Anna Kalinskaya → replaced by (United States) Caty McNally / (United States) Jessica Pegula
- (Japan) Miyu Kato / Liudmila Samsonova → not replaced
