= 2026 Mutua Madrid Open – Women's singles =

Women's singles
- 2026 Mutua Madrid Open

Final
- Champion: (Ukraine) Marta Kostyuk
- Runner-up: Mirra Andreeva
- Score: 6–3, 7–5
- Date: 2 May 2026

Details
- Draw: 96 (12Q, 8WC)
- Seeds: 32

Events
Singles	men	women
Doubles	men	women
- Madrid Open

Marta Kostyuk defeated Mirra Andreeva in the final, 6–3, 7–5 to win the women's singles tennis title at the 2026 Madrid Open. It was her first WTA 1000 title and third WTA Tour title overall.

Aryna Sabalenka was the defending champion, but lost in the quarterfinals to Hailey Baptiste. This ended a streak of seven consecutive WTA Tour events being won by the top seeds, beginning at Indian Wells.

Anastasia Potapova became the first lucky loser to reach a WTA 1000 or Tier I semifinal in the format's history (since 1990), and the first Austrian player to do so since Sybille Bammer at the 2007 Indian Wells Open.

With her loss to Kaitlin Quevedo in the first round, Venus Williams became the first former world No. 1 to lose 10 consecutive singles matches since the rankings were first published in 1975.

== Seeds ==
All seeds received a bye into the second round.

1. Aryna Sabalenka (quarterfinals)
2. (Kazakhstan) Elena Rybakina (fourth round)
3. (United States) Coco Gauff (fourth round)
4. (Poland) Iga Świątek (third round, retired)
5. (United States) Jessica Pegula (third round)
6. (United States) Amanda Anisimova (withdrew)
7. (Ukraine) Elina Svitolina (second round)
8. (Italy) Jasmine Paolini (third round)
9. Mirra Andreeva (final)
10. (Canada) Victoria Mboko (second round)
11. (Switzerland) Belinda Bencic (fourth round)
12. Ekaterina Alexandrova (withdrew)
13. (Czech Republic) Linda Nosková (quarterfinals)
14. (Japan) Naomi Osaka (fourth round)
15. (United States) Iva Jovic (third round)
16. (United States) Madison Keys (withdrew)
17. (Denmark) Clara Tauson (withdrew)
18. Diana Shnaider (third round)
19. (Belgium) Elise Mertens (third round)
20. Liudmila Samsonova (third round, withdrew)
21. (Latvia) Jeļena Ostapenko (third round)
22. Anna Kalinskaya (second round)
23. (Czech Republic) Marie Bouzková (second round)
24. (Canada) Leylah Fernandez (quarterfinals)
25. (Romania) Sorana Cîrstea (third round)
26. (Ukraine) Marta Kostyuk (champion)
27. (Spain) Cristina Bucșa (second round)
28. (China) Wang Xinyu (second round)
29. (Romania) Jaqueline Cristian (third round)
30. (United States) Hailey Baptiste (semifinals)
31. (United States) Ann Li (fourth round)
32. (China) Zheng Qinwen (third round)
33. (Greece) Maria Sakkari (second round)
34. (Poland) Magdalena Fręch (second round)

Click on the seed number of a player to go to their draw section.

== Draw ==
Key

- Q = Qualifier
- WC = Wild card
- LL = Lucky loser
- Alt = Alternate
- ITF = ITF entry
- PR = Protected ranking
- SR = Special ranking
- SE = Special exempt
- JE = Junior exempt
- JR = Junior Accelerator Programme entrant
- CO = College Accelerator Programme entrant
- NG = Next Gen Accelerator Program entrant
- w/o = Walkover
- r = Retired
- d = Defaulted

=== Finals ===
Quarterfinals
1	Aryna Sabalenka	6	2	6^{6}
30	(United States) Hailey Baptiste	2	6	7^{8}
24	(Canada) Leylah Fernandez	6^{1}	3
9	Mirra Andreeva	7^{7}	6
26	(Ukraine) Marta Kostyuk	7^{7}	6
13	(Czech Republic) Linda Nosková	6^{1}	0
PR	(Czech Republic) Karolína Plíšková	1	7^{7}	3
LL	(Austria) Anastasia Potapova	6	6^{4}	6

Semifinals
30	(United States) Hailey Baptiste	4	6^{8}
9	Mirra Andreeva	6	7^{10}
26	(Ukraine) Marta Kostyuk	6	1	6
LL	(Austria) Anastasia Potapova	2	6	1

Final
9	Mirra Andreeva	3	5
26	(Ukraine) Marta Kostyuk	6	7

=== Top half ===
==== Section 1 ====
First round
(United States) P Stearns	6	6
(France) L Boisson	1	3
(Japan) M Uchijima	3	6	3
LL	(Ukraine) Y Starodubtseva	6	1	6
Q	(Ukraine) A Kalinina	6	5	6
(Uzbekistan) K Rakhimova	2	7	2
A Zakharova	0	3
(Colombia) C Osorio	6	6

Second round
1	A Sabalenka	7	6
(United States) P Stearns	5	3
LL	(Ukraine) Y Starodubtseva	6	6^{5}	4
29	(Romania) J Cristian	3	7^{7}	6
23	(Czech Republic) M Bouzková	4	3
Q	(Ukraine) A Kalinina	6	6
(Colombia) C Osorio	2	5
14	(Japan) N Osaka	6	7

Third round
1	A Sabalenka	6	6
29	(Romania) J Cristian	1	4
Q	(Ukraine) A Kalinina	1	3
14	(Japan) N Osaka	6	6

Fourth round
1	A Sabalenka	6^{1}	6	6
14	(Japan) N Osaka	7^{7}	3	2

==== Section 2 ====
First round
(Croatia) P Marčinko	6	7
WC	(Andorra) V Jiménez Kasintseva	0	5
(Brazil) B Haddad Maia	1	1
(Spain) J Bouzas Maneiro	6	6
WC	(Spain) K Quevedo	6	6
WC	(United States) V Williams	2	4
(Germany) L Siegemund	6	6
PR	(Romania) I-C Begu	4	0

Second round
11	(Switzerland) B Bencic	6	6
(Croatia) P Marčinko	4	2
(Spain) J Bouzas Maneiro	6	5	1
18	D Shnaider	3	7	6
30	(United States) H Baptiste	6	6
WC	(Spain) K Quevedo	1	4
(Germany) L Siegemund	6	2	4
8	(Italy) J Paolini	3	6	6

Third round
11	(Switzerland) B Bencic	6	7^{8}
18	D Shnaider	2	6^{6}
30	(United States) H Baptiste	7	6
8	(Italy) J Paolini	5	3

Fourth round
11	(Switzerland) B Bencic	1	7^{16}	3
30	(United States) H Baptiste	6	6^{14}	6

==== Section 3 ====
First round
Q	(Ukraine) D Snigur	6	3	7^{15}
(Australia) D Kasatkina	3	6	6^{13}
Q	(United States) A Parks	6	6
(Italy) E Cocciaretto	3	2
WC	(Spain) P Badosa	6^{3}	6	0
(Austria) J Grabher	7^{7}	4	6
WC	(United States) R Montgomery	4	3
(Poland) M Linette	6	6

Second round
4	(Poland) I Świątek	6	6
Q	(Ukraine) D Snigur	1	2
Q	(United States) A Parks	2	7^{7}	3
31	(United States) A Li	6	6^{5}	6
24	(Canada) L Fernandez	6	6
(Austria) J Grabher	2	3
(Poland) M Linette	4	1
15	(United States) I Jovic	6	6

Third round
4	(Poland) I Świątek	6^{4}	6	0^{r}
31	(United States) A Li	7^{7}	2	3
24	(Canada) L Fernandez	3	6	6
15	(United States) I Jovic	6	3	2

Fourth round
31	(United States) A Li	3	2
24	(Canada) L Fernandez	6	6

==== Section 4 ====
First round
LL	(Hungary) P Udvardy	6	1	6
(Australia) K Birrell	4	6	1
Q	(Hungary) D Gálfi	7^{9}	6
(Australia) A Tomljanović	6^{7}	4
(Germany) T Maria	4	2
WC	(Czech Republic) L Samson	6	6
(Hungary) A Bondár	6	6
(Switzerland) V Golubic	2	3

Second round
9	M Andreeva	7	6
LL	(Hungary) P Udvardy	5	2
Q	(Hungary) D Gálfi	6	6
22	A Kalinskaya	3	3
28	(China) Xin Wang	6	3	0
WC	(Czech Republic) L Samson	2	6	6
(Hungary) A Bondár	6	6
7	(Ukraine) E Svitolina	3	4

Third round
9	M Andreeva	6	6
Q	(Hungary) D Gálfi	3	2
WC	(Czech Republic) L Samson	6^{3}	1
(Hungary) A Bondár	7^{7}	6

Fourth round
9	M Andreeva	6^{5}	6	7^{7}
(Hungary) A Bondár	7^{7}	3	6^{5}

=== Bottom half ===
==== Section 5 ====
First round
(United States) T Townsend	4	2
(United Kingdom) K Boulter	6	6
(Kazakhstan) Y Putintseva	6	4	6
(Czech Republic) T Valentová	4	6	3
Q	(United States) E Kalieva	3	4
(Czech Republic) K Siniaková	6	6
(United States) C McNally	6	6
Q	(United States) K Volynets	1	2

Second round
5	(United States) J Pegula	6	6
(United Kingdom) K Boulter	4	4
(Kazakhstan) Y Putintseva	1	3
26	(Ukraine) M Kostyuk	6	6
LL	A Blinkova	2	2
(Czech Republic) K Siniaková	6	6
(United States) C McNally	6	6
10	(Canada) V Mboko	4	1

Third round
5	(United States) J Pegula	1	4
26	(Ukraine) M Kostyuk	6	6
(Czech Republic) K Siniaková	3	6	6^{2}
(United States) C McNally	6	2	7^{7}

Fourth round
26	(Ukraine) M Kostyuk	6	6
(United States) C McNally	2	3

==== Section 6 ====
First round
(Australia) T Gibson	3	2
WC	(Colombia) E Arango	6	6
(Indonesia) J Tjen	6	6
Q	A Charaeva	4	2
(France) E Jacquemot	1	2
Q	(Italy) TC Grant	6	6
O Selekhmeteva	4	1
Q	(France) L Jeanjean	6	6

Second round
13	(Czech Republic) L Nosková	6	6
WC	(Colombia) E Arango	3	2
(Indonesia) J Tjen	2	1
20	L Samsonova	6	6
25	(Romania) S Cîrstea	6	7^{7}
Q	(Italy) TC Grant	2	6^{5}
Q	(France) L Jeanjean	3	0
3	(United States) C Gauff	6	6

Third round
13	(Czech Republic) L Nosková	w/o
20	L Samsonova
25	(Romania) S Cîrstea	6	5	1
3	(United States) C Gauff	4	7	6

Fourth round
13	(Czech Republic) L Nosková	6	1	7^{7}
3	(United States) C Gauff	4	6	6^{5}

==== Section 7 ====
First round
(Ukraine) D Yastremska	6^{10}	6^{8}
(Argentina) S Sierra	7^{12}	7^{10}
(Turkey) Z Sönmez	7	6
WC	(Spain) C Martínez Círez	5	2
Q	A Pavlyuchenkova	3	3
(Philippines) A Eala	6	6
PR	(Czech Republic) Ka Plíšková	2	6	6
Q	(Austria) S Kraus	6	1	4

Second round
34	(Poland) M Fręch	2	4
(Argentina) S Sierra	6	6
(Turkey) Z Sönmez	6	6^{4}	6
27	(Spain) C Bucșa	1	7^{7}	2
19	(Belgium) E Mertens	6	6
(Philippines) A Eala	2	1
PR	(Czech Republic) Ka Plíšková	6	7^{8}
33	(Greece) M Sakkari	4	6^{6}

Third round
(Argentina) S Sierra	0	6	6
(Turkey) Z Sönmez	6	2	3
19	(Belgium) E Mertens	5	6	6^{3}
PR	(Czech Republic) Ka Plíšková	7	2	7^{7}

Fourth round
(Argentina) S Sierra	4	3
PR	(Czech Republic) Ka Plíšková	6	6

==== Section 8 ====
First round
(China) S Zhang	6	6
(Germany) E Lys	4	3
(Ukraine) O Oliynykova	5	0
Q	(Switzerland) S Waltert	7	6
(United States) A Krueger	6^{2}	4
(United States) S Kenin	7^{7}	6
(Romania) E-G Ruse	6	4	6
(Croatia) A Ružić	3	6	0

Second round
LL	(Austria) A Potapova	6	6
(China) S Zhang	3	1
Q	(Switzerland) S Waltert	2	5
21	(Latvia) J Ostapenko	6	7
32	(China) Q Zheng	1	6	6
(United States) S Kenin	6	3	3
(Romania) E-G Ruse	6	3	5
2	(Kazakhstan) E Rybakina	4	6	7

Third round
LL	(Austria) A Potapova	4	6	6
21	(Latvia) J Ostapenko	6	4	4
32	(China) Q Zheng	6	4	3
2	(Kazakhstan) E Rybakina	4	6	6

Fourth round
LL	(Austria) A Potapova	7^{10}	6
2	(Kazakhstan) E Rybakina	6^{8}	4

== Seeded players ==
The following are the seeded players. Seedings are based on WTA rankings as of 13 April 2026. Rankings and points before are as of 20 April 2026.

^{‡}	Champion
^{†}	Runner-up

Seed	Rank	Player	Points before	Points defending	Points won	Points after	Status
1	1	Aryna Sabalenka	10,895	1,000	215	10,110	Quarterfinals lost to (United States) Hailey Baptiste [30]
2	2	(Kazakhstan) Elena Rybakina	8,500	65	120	8,555	Fourth round lost to (Austria) Anastasia Potapova [LL]
3	3	(United States) Coco Gauff	7,279	650	120	6,749	Fourth round lost to (Czech Republic) Linda Nosková [13]
4	4	(Poland) Iga Świątek	7,273	390	65	6,948	Third round retired against (United States) Ann Li [31]
5	5	(United States) Jessica Pegula	6,136	65	65	6,136	Third round lost to (Ukraine) Marta Kostyuk [26]
~~6~~	~~6~~	~~(United States) Amanda Anisimova~~	5,995	10	0	5,985	Withdrew due to wrist injury
7	7	(Ukraine) Elina Svitolina	3,910	390	10	3,530	Second round lost to (Hungary) Anna Bondár
8	9	(Italy) Jasmine Paolini	3,722	65	65	3,722	Third round lost to (United States) Hailey Baptiste [30]
9	8	Mirra Andreeva^{†}	3,746	215	650	4,181	Runner-up, lost to (Ukraine) Marta Kostyuk [26]
10	10	(Canada) Victoria Mboko	3,531	(10)^{∆}	10	3,531	Second round lost to (United States) Caty McNally
11	12	(Switzerland) Belinda Bencic	3,090	120	120	3,090	Fourth round lost to (United States) Hailey Baptiste [30]
~~12~~	~~14~~	~~Ekaterina Alexandrova~~	2,789	120	0	2,669	Withdrew due to back injury
13	13	(Czech Republic) Linda Nosková	2,849	65	215	2,999	Quarterfinals lost to (Ukraine) Marta Kostyuk [26]
14	15	(Japan) Naomi Osaka	2,324	10+125	120+32	2,341	Fourth round lost to Aryna Sabalenka [1]
15	16	(United States) Iva Jovic	2,270	(100)^{@}	65	2,235	Third round lost to (Canada) Leylah Fernandez [24]
~~16~~	~~17~~	(United States) ~~Madison Keys~~	2,161	215	0	1,946	Withdrew due to illness
~~17~~	~~18~~	(Denmark) ~~Clara Tauson~~	2,040	10	0	2,030	Withdrew due to back injury
18	19	Diana Shnaider	2,001	120	65	1,946	Third round lost to (Switzerland) Belinda Bencic [11]
19	21	(Belgium) Elise Mertens	1,858	65	65	1,858	Third round lost to (Czech Republic) Karolína Plíšková [PR]
20	20	Liudmila Samsonova	1,895	65	65	1,895	Third round withdrew due to illness
21	40	(Latvia) Jeļena Ostapenko	1,314	10	65	1,369	Third round lost to (Austria) Anastasia Potapova [LL]
22	22	Anna Kalinskaya	1,813	65	10	1,758	Second round lost to (Hungary) Dalma Gálfi [Q]
23	24	(Czech Republic) Marie Bouzková	1,676	35	10	1,651	Second round lost to (Ukraine) Anhelina Kalinina [Q]
24	25	(Canada) Leylah Fernandez	1,646	10	215	1,851	Quarterfinals lost to Mirra Andreeva [9]
25	26	(Romania) Sorana Cîrstea	1,540	10	65	1,595	Third round lost to (United States) Coco Gauff [3]
26	23	(Ukraine) Marta Kostyuk^{‡}	1,722	215	1,000	2,507	Champion, defeated Mirra Andreeva [9]
27	30	(Spain) Cristina Bucșa	1,426	30	10	1,406	Second round lost to (Turkey) Zeynep Sönmez
28	31	(China) Wang Xinyu	1,401	10	10	1,401	Second round lost to (Czech Republic) Laura Samson [WC]
29	33	(Romania) Jaqueline Cristian	1,382	10	65	1,437	Third round vs. Aryna Sabalenka [1]
30	32	(United States) Hailey Baptiste	1,392	35	390	1,747	Semifinals lost to Mirra Andreeva [9]
31	34	(United States) Ann Li	1,380	65	120	1,435	Fourth round lost to (Canada) Leylah Fernandez [24]
32	36	(China) Zheng Qinwen	1,350	10	65	1,405	Third round lost to (Kazakhstan) Elena Rybakina [2]
33	37	(Greece) Maria Sakkari	1,348	120	10	1,238	Second round lost to (Czech Republic) Karolína Plíšková [PR]
34	38	(Poland) Magdalena Fręch	1,318	65	10	1,263	Second round lost to (Argentina) Solana Sierra

∆ The player is defending points from her 18th best result.
@ The player did not qualify for the main draw in 2025 and is defending points from an ITF event.

=== Withdrawn seeded players ===
The following players would have been seeded, but withdrew before the tournament began.

Rank	Player	Points before	Points defending	Points after	Withdrawal reason
11	(Czech Republic) Karolína Muchová	3,318	0	3,318	Fatigue
27	(United Kingdom) Emma Raducanu	1,465	35	1,430	Illness
28	(United States) Emma Navarro	1,442	65	1,377	Undisclosed
29	(Australia) Maya Joint	1,435	65	1,370	Lower back injury

== Other entry information ==
=== Wildcards ===
- (Colombia) Emiliana Arango
- (Spain) Paula Badosa
- (Andorra) Victoria Jiménez Kasintseva
- (Spain) Carlota Martínez Círez
- (United States) Robin Montgomery
- (Spain) Kaitlin Quevedo
- (Czech Republic) Laura Samson
- (United States) Venus Williams

=== Protected ranking ===
- (Romania) Irina-Camelia Begu
- (Czech Republic) Karolína Plíšková

=== Withdrawals ===
- † Ekaterina Alexandrova → replaced by (Ukraine) Yuliia Starodubtseva (LL)
- † (United States) Amanda Anisimova → replaced by (Hungary) Panna Udvardy (LL)
- ‡ (Czech Republic) Sára Bejlek → replaced by (Turkey) Zeynep Sönmez
- ‡ (France) Varvara Gracheva → replaced by (Germany) Eva Lys
- ‡ (Australia) Maya Joint → replaced by (Japan) Moyuka Uchijima
- ‡ (United Kingdom) Sonay Kartal → replaced by (Croatia) Petra Marčinko
- ‡ (United States) McCartney Kessler → replaced by (Uzbekistan) Kamilla Rakhimova
- † (United States) Madison Keys → replaced by (Austria) Anastasia Potapova (LL)
- ‡ (Czech Republic) Barbora Krejčiková → replaced by (Romania) Irina-Camelia Begu
- ‡ Veronika Kudermetova → replaced by (United States) Taylor Townsend
- ‡ (Czech Republic) Karolína Muchová → replaced by (Switzerland) Viktorija Golubic
- ‡ (United States) Emma Navarro → replaced by (United States) Ashlyn Krueger
- ‡ (United Kingdom) Emma Raducanu → replaced by (Australia) Ajla Tomljanović
- † (Denmark) Clara Tauson → replaced by Anna Blinkova (LL)
- ‡ (Czech Republic) Markéta Vondroušová → replaced by (Austria) Julia Grabher

‡ – withdrew from entry list
† – withdrew from main draw

== Qualifying ==
=== Seeds ===
1. (Ukraine) Yuliia Starodubtseva (qualifying competition, lucky loser)
2. (Austria) Anastasia Potapova (qualifying competition, lucky loser)
3. (Croatia) Donna Vekić (first round)
4. (Hungary) Panna Udvardy (qualifying competition, lucky loser)
5. (United States) Katie Volynets (qualified)
6. Anna Blinkova (qualifying competition, lucky loser)
7. (Switzerland) Simona Waltert (qualified)
8. (Hungary) Dalma Gálfi (qualified)
9. (United States) Alycia Parks (qualified)
10. (Czech Republic) Nikola Bartůňková (qualifying competition)
11. (Belgium) Hanne Vandewinkel (qualifying competition)
12. (France) Diane Parry (first round)
13. (Ukraine) Daria Snigur (qualified)
14. (Germany) Tamara Korpatsch (qualifying competition)
15. (Slovenia) Veronika Erjavec (first round)
16. (Ukraine) Anhelina Kalinina (qualified)
17. (New Zealand) Lulu Sun (first round)
18. Aliaksandra Sasnovich (first round)
19. (Czech Republic) Darja Vidmanova (qualifying competition)
20. Anastasia Pavlyuchenkova (qualified)
21. (Netherlands) Suzan Lamens (first round)
22. (Austria) Sinja Kraus (qualified)
23. (Slovakia) Rebecca Šramková (first round)
24. (Czech Republic) Dominika Šalková (qualifying competition)

=== Qualifiers ===
1. Anastasia Pavlyuchenkova
2. (Austria) Sinja Kraus
3. (France) Léolia Jeanjean
4. (Italy) Tyra Caterina Grant
5. (United States) Katie Volynets
6. (United States) Elvina Kalieva
7. (Switzerland) Simona Waltert
8. (Hungary) Dalma Gálfi
9. (United States) Alycia Parks
10. Alina Charaeva
11. (Ukraine) Daria Snigur
12. (Ukraine) Anhelina Kalinina

=== Lucky losers ===
1. (Ukraine) Yuliia Starodubtseva
2. (Hungary) Panna Udvardy
3. (Austria) Anastasia Potapova
4. Anna Blinkova

=== Qualifying draw ===
==== First qualifier ====
First round
1	(Ukraine) Yuliia Starodubtseva	6	6
(Italy) Lucrezia Stefanini	0	1
(Bulgaria) Viktoriya Tomova	3	2
20	Anastasia Pavlyuchenkova	6	6

Qualifying competition
1	(Ukraine) Yuliia Starodubtseva	4	6	4
20	Anastasia Pavlyuchenkova	6	0	6

==== Second qualifier ====
First round
2	(Austria) Anastasia Potapova	6	7
(Serbia) Teodora Kostović	4	5
(Italy) Martina Trevisan	3	2
22	(Austria) Sinja Kraus	6	6

Qualifying competition
2	(Austria) Anastasia Potapova	2	7^{7}	3
22	(Austria) Sinja Kraus	6	6^{5}	6

==== Third qualifier ====
First round
3	(Croatia) Donna Vekić	3	6	4
(France) Léolia Jeanjean	6	3	6
(Switzerland) Rebeka Masarova	6	7
23	(Slovakia) Rebecca Šramková	3	5

Qualifying competition
(France) Léolia Jeanjean	6	3	6
(Switzerland) Rebeka Masarova	3	6	3

==== Fourth qualifier ====
First round
4	(Hungary) Panna Udvardy	6	6
WC	(United States) Julieta Pareja	4	1
WC	(Italy) Tyra Caterina Grant	7^{7}	7
15	(Slovenia) Veronika Erjavec	6^{3}	5

Qualifying competition
4	(Hungary) Panna Udvardy	6	3	2
WC	(Italy) Tyra Caterina Grant	0	6	6

==== Fifth qualifier ====
First round
5	(United States) Katie Volynets	6	4	6
PR	(France) Océane Dodin	0	6	1
PR	(Spain) Sara Sorribes Tormo	4	1^{r}
14	(Germany) Tamara Korpatsch	6	3

Qualifying competition
5	(United States) Katie Volynets	7	5	6
14	(Germany) Tamara Korpatsch	5	7	2

==== Sixth qualifier ====
First round
6	Anna Blinkova	6^{3}	7	6
(Italy) Nuria Brancaccio	7^{7}	5	4
(United States) Elvina Kalieva	6	6
21	(Netherlands) Suzan Lamens	4	3

Qualifying competition
6	Anna Blinkova	2	6	5
(United States) Elvina Kalieva	6	3	7

==== Seventh qualifier ====
First round
7	(Switzerland) Simona Waltert	7	6
(Greece) Despina Papamichail	5	3
WC	(Spain) Ruth Roura Llaverias	5	1
24	(Czech Republic) Dominika Šalková	7	6

Qualifying competition
7	(Switzerland) Simona Waltert	6	6
24	(Czech Republic) Dominika Šalková	0	2

==== Eighth qualifier ====
First round
8	(Hungary) Dalma Gálfi	6	6
(Spain) Leyre Romero Gormaz	1	3
(Serbia) Lola Radivojević	3	3
19	(Czech Republic) Darja Vidmanova	6	6

Qualifying competition
8	(Hungary) Dalma Gálfi	7	6
19	(Czech Republic) Darja Vidmanova	5	3

==== Ninth qualifier ====
First round
9	(United States) Alycia Parks	6	6
WC	(Armenia) Elina Avanesyan	1	2
WC	(France) Ksenia Efremova	6	7
17	(New Zealand) Lulu Sun	4	5

Qualifying competition
9	(United States) Alycia Parks	6	7^{7}
WC	(France) Ksenia Efremova	1	6^{4}

==== Tenth qualifier ====
First round
10	(Czech Republic) Nikola Bartůňková	6	2	6
(Poland) Katarzyna Kawa	4	6	3
Alina Charaeva	6	6
18	Aliaksandra Sasnovich	3	4

Qualifying competition
10	(Czech Republic) Nikola Bartůňková	7^{8}	2	6^{6}
Alina Charaeva	6^{6}	6	7^{8}

==== Eleventh qualifier ====
First round
11	(Belgium) Hanne Vandewinkel	6	7
(Czech Republic) Linda Fruhvirtová	2	5
WC	(Brazil) Nauhany Vitória Leme da Silva	5	1
13	(Ukraine) Daria Snigur	7	6

Qualifying competition
11	(Belgium) Hanne Vandewinkel	6^{4}	4
13	(Ukraine) Daria Snigur	7^{7}	6

==== Twelfth qualifier ====
First round
12	(France) Diane Parry	2	4
PR	(United States) Sloane Stephens	6	6
(Spain) Marina Bassols Ribera	2	1
16	(Ukraine) Anhelina Kalinina	6	6

Qualifying competition
PR	(United States) Sloane Stephens	6	6^{5}	2
16	(Ukraine) Anhelina Kalinina	2	7^{7}	6
