= 2026 Upper Austria Ladies Linz – Singles =

Singles
- 2026 Upper Austria Ladies Linz

Final
- Champion: Mirra Andreeva
- Runner-up: (Austria) Anastasia Potapova
- Score: 1–6, 6–4, 6–3

Details
- Draw: 28 (4Q / 4WC)
- Seeds: 8

Events
Singles	Doubles
- Linz Open

Mirra Andreeva defeated Anastasia Potapova in the final, 1–6, 6–4, 6–3 to win the singles tennis title at the 2026 Upper Austria Ladies Linz. It was her fifth WTA Tour singles title.

Ekaterina Alexandrova was the defending champion, but lost in the second round to Karolína Plíšková.

== Seeds ==
The top four seeds received a bye into the second round.

1. Mirra Andreeva (champion)
2. Ekaterina Alexandrova (second round)
3. Liudmila Samsonova (second round)
4. (Latvia) Jeļena Ostapenko (quarterfinals)
5. (Romania) Sorana Cîrstea (quarterfinals)
6. (Romania) Jaqueline Cristian (first round)
7. (United States) Ann Li (first round)
8. (Czech Republic) Sára Bejlek (withdrew)

== Draw ==
Key

- Q = Qualifier
- WC = Wild card
- LL = Lucky loser
- Alt = Alternate
- ITF = ITF entry
- PR = Protected ranking
- SR = Special ranking
- SE = Special exempt
- JE = Junior exempt
- JR = Junior Accelerator Programme entrant
- CO = College Accelerator Programme entrant
- NG = Next Gen Accelerator Program entrant
- w/o = Walkover
- r = Retired
- d = Defaulted

=== Finals ===
Semifinals
1	Mirra Andreeva	6	6
(Romania) Elena-Gabriela Ruse	4	1
(Austria) Anastasia Potapova	6	6
Q	(Croatia) Donna Vekić	4	2

Final
1	Mirra Andreeva	1	6	6
(Austria) Anastasia Potapova	6	4	3

=== Top half ===
First round
WC	(United States) S Stephens	1	7^{7}	6
(Germany) T Maria	6	6^{5}	4
(United States) A Parks	3	3
(Hungary) D Gálfi	6	6
WC	(Austria) S Kraus	3	3
5	(Romania) S Cîrstea	6	6
(Austria) J Grabher	4	3
(Philippines) A Eala	6	6
(United Kingdom) K Boulter	6^{3}	6^{2}
(Romania) E-G Ruse	7^{7}	7^{7}
(Ukraine) D Yastremska	7	4	6
7	(United States) A Li	5	6	3

Second round
1	M Andreeva	6	6
WC	(United States) S Stephens	4	2
(Hungary) D Gálfi	0^{r}
5	(Romania) S Cîrstea	5
4	(Latvia) J Ostapenko	6	7
(Philippines) A Eala	4	5
(Romania) E-G Ruse	4	6	6
(Ukraine) D Yastremska	6	4	4

Quarterfinals
1	M Andreeva	7^{7}	4	6
5	(Romania) S Cîrstea	6^{4}	6	2
4	(Latvia) J Ostapenko	6	4	1
(Romania) E-G Ruse	4	6	6

Semifinals
1	M Andreeva	6	6
(Romania) E-G Ruse	4	1

=== Bottom half ===
First round
6	(Romania) J Cristian	6	1	4
Q	(Germany) T Korpatsch	4	6	6
(Austria) A Potapova	6	6
(China) S Zhang	4	4
WC	(Spain) P Badosa	4	6^{5}
WC	(Austria) L Tagger	6	7^{7}
LL	(Ukraine) A Kalinina	5	6	6
(Hungary) P Udvardy	7	1	0
Q	(United States) K Volynets	3	6	4
Q	(Croatia) D Vekić	6	3	6
PR	(Czech Republic) Ka Plíšková	6	6
Q	A Sasnovich	4	4

Second round
Q	(Germany) T Korpatsch	2	1
(Austria) A Potapova	6	6
WC	(Austria) L Tagger	6	7^{13}
3	L Samsonova	2	6^{11}
LL	(Ukraine) A Kalinina
Q	(Croatia) D Vekić	w/o
PR	(Czech Republic) Ka Plíšková	6	6
2	E Alexandrova	1	3

Quarterfinals
(Austria) A Potapova	7^{9}	6
WC	(Austria) L Tagger	6^{7}	0
Q	(Croatia) D Vekić	7	6
PR	(Czech Republic) Ka Plíšková	5	4

Semifinals
(Austria) A Potapova	6	6
Q	(Croatia) D Vekić	4	2

== Qualifying ==
=== Seeds ===
1. (United States) Katie Volynets (qualified)
2. (Andorra) Victoria Jiménez Kasintseva (first round)
3. (Germany) Tamara Korpatsch (qualified)
4. Aliaksandra Sasnovich (qualified)
5. (Croatia) Donna Vekić (qualified)
6. (Ukraine) Anhelina Kalinina (qualifying competition, lucky loser)
7. (Czech Republic) Dominika Šalková (qualifying competition)
8. Alina Charaeva (first round)

=== Qualifiers ===
1. (United States) Katie Volynets
2. (Croatia) Donna Vekić
3. (Germany) Tamara Korpatsch
4. Aliaksandra Sasnovich

=== Lucky loser ===
1. (Ukraine) Anhelina Kalinina

=== Qualifying draw ===
==== First qualifier ====
First round
1	(United States) Katie Volynets	6	6
PR	(France) Océane Dodin	4	0
PR	(United States) Madison Brengle	2	2
7	(Czech Republic) Dominika Šalková	6	6

Qualifying competition
1	(United States) Katie Volynets	3	6	6
7	(Czech Republic) Dominika Šalková	6	2	4

==== Second qualifier ====
First round
2	(Andorra) Victoria Jiménez Kasintseva	5	3
Iryna Shymanovich	7	6
(France) Carole Monnet	2	4
5	(Croatia) Donna Vekić	6	6

Qualifying competition
Iryna Shymanovich	6	6^{4}	4
5	(Croatia) Donna Vekić	4	7^{7}	6

==== Third qualifier ====
First round
3	(Germany) Tamara Korpatsch	6	6
WC	(Germany) Jule Niemeier	3	2
(Uzbekistan) Maria Timofeeva	1	6	6
8	Alina Charaeva	6	3	3

Qualifying competition
3	(Germany) Tamara Korpatsch	6	6
(Uzbekistan) Maria Timofeeva	3	4

==== Fourth qualifier ====
First round
4	Aliaksandra Sasnovich	6	6
(Czech Republic) Linda Fruhvirtová	0	1
WC	(Germany) Anna-Lena Friedsam	4	4
6	(Ukraine) Anhelina Kalinina	6	6

Qualifying competition
4	Aliaksandra Sasnovich	6	6
6	(Ukraine) Anhelina Kalinina	3	2
