= Mirra Andreeva =

Russian tennis player (born 2007)

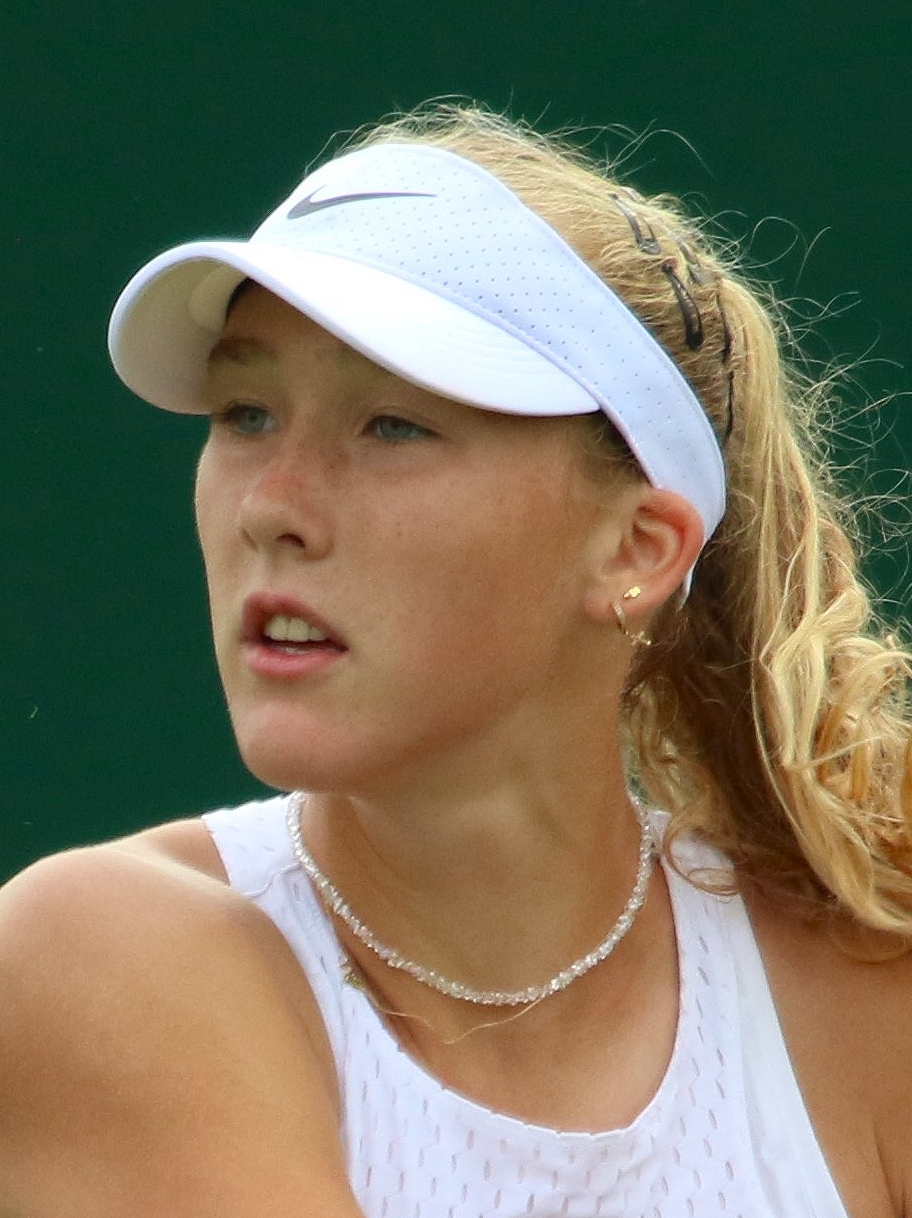
- Andreeva at the 2023 Wimbledon Championships
- Full name: Mirra Aleksandrovna Andreeva (Note: also romanized as Mirra Andreyeva)
- Native name: Мирра Александровна Андреева (Note: Russian: Мирра А. Андреева, IPA: [ˈmʲir:ɐ‿ɐlʲɪkˈsandrəvnɐ‿ɐnˈdrʲejɪvə])
- Country (sports): Russia
- Residence: Cannes, France
- Born: 29 April 2007 (age 19) Krasnoyarsk, Russia
- Height: 1.75 m (5 ft 9 in)
- Turned pro: 2022
- Plays: Right (two-handed backhand)
- Coach: Conchita Martínez
- Prize money: US$18,067,747: 37th in all-time rankings

Singles
- Career record: 204–66
- Career titles: 7
- Highest ranking: No. 2 (16 November 2026)
- Current ranking: No. 2 (16 November 2026)

Grand Slam singles results
- Australian Open: 4R (2024, 2025, 2026)
- French Open: W (2026)
- Wimbledon: QF (2025)
- US Open: QF (2026)

Other tournaments
- Tour Finals: W (2026)
- Olympic Games: 1R (2024)

Doubles
- Career record: 58–35
- Career titles: 3
- Highest ranking: No. 12 (15 September 2025)
- Current ranking: No. 41 (2 November 2026)

Grand Slam doubles results
- Australian Open: SF (2025)
- French Open: SF (2025)
- Wimbledon: 3R (2025)
- US Open: QF (2025)

Grand Slam mixed doubles results
- US Open: SF (2026)

Other mixed doubles tournaments
- Olympic Games: 1R (2024)
Medal record
Women's tennis
Representing Individual Neutral Athletes
Olympic Games
| Silver medal – second place | 2024 Paris | Doubles |
- Last updated on: 16 November 2026.

Mirra Aleksandrovna Andreeva (born 29 April 2007) is a Russian professional tennis player. She is currently ranked world No. 2 in women's singles by the Women's Tennis Association (WTA), achieved in November 2026, and has been ranked as high as No. 12 in doubles, achieved in September 2025. Andreeva has won seven WTA Tour–level singles titles, including a major at the 2026 French Open, as well as the 2026 WTA Finals and two WTA 1000 events. In doubles, Andreeva has won three titles, including two WTA 1000 events, and a silver medal at the 2024 Paris Olympics, partnering Diana Shnaider.

A teenage phenomenon, Andreeva reached the fourth round at both the 2023 Madrid Open and the 2023 Wimbledon Championships at age 16, finishing the season inside the top 50. In 2024, she reached the French Open semifinals by defeating world No. 2 Aryna Sabalenka, and won her first WTA Tour title. In 2025, Andreeva won consecutive WTA 1000 titles in Dubai and Indian Wells and made her debut in the top 5. The following season, she won her first major title as a 19-year-old at the French Open, in addition to the WTA Finals, and finished the year as the world No. 2.

== Early life ==
Mirra Andreeva was born in 2007 in Krasnoyarsk, Russia, to Raisa and Alexander Andreev. She has an elder sister, Erika. When Erika was born, Raisa and Alexander debated between tennis and volleyball for their daughters. Raisa enrolled Erika in a tennis program first, and Mirra started playing tennis later, at the age of six. Mirra first trained in the Krasnoyarsk Tennis Hall club under the guidance of Marina Pavlova. To have better training opportunities, her family moved to Sochi, where Kirill Kryukov became the sisters' coach. The sisters also trained at the J-Pro Tennis Academy in Moscow.

== Juniors ==
Andreeva began competing on the ITF Junior Circuit in 2020 at the age of 13, making her debut at a Grade 5 tournament in Kazan, Russia. In November, she won her first junior singles title at a Grade 4 tournament in Antalya, Turkey, defeating Anna Zyryanova in the final.

In July 2021, Andreeva was part of the Russian team that won the European under-14 Summer Cup in Sanremo, Italy, defeating Rositsa Dencheva in the final against Bulgaria. The following month, Russia also won the ITF World Junior Tennis Finals in Prostějov, Czech Republic, with Andreeva winning all six of her singles matches. In October, she won the singles title at the Grade 2 junior tournament in Vigo, Spain.

In 2022, Andreeva reached the quarterfinals of the girls' singles events at both the French Open and the US Open. At the French Open, she lost to Sára Bejlek, while at the US Open, she defeated top seed Sofia Costoulas before losing to eventual champion Alexandra Eala.

In January 2023, Andreeva reached the singles final of the ITF J300 tournament in Traralgon, Australia, and won the doubles title alongside Alina Korneeva. At the Australian Open, she reached her first junior Grand Slam singles final, losing to Korneeva in three sets. The match lasted three hours and 18 minutes, 22 minutes longer than the men's singles final. The pair also reached the semifinals of the girls' doubles event.

Andreeva reached a career-high ITF junior combined ranking of world No. 1 on 29 May 2023.

== Professional ==
=== 2022: WTA Tour debut and four ITF titles ===
Andreeva made her professional debut in February 2022 at an ITF W15 tournament in Sharm El Sheikh, Egypt. In April, she won her first professional singles titles at two consecutive W15 tournaments in Antalya, Turkey. In July, she won the W25 title at the Open Castilla y León in El Espinar, Spain.

In October, at the age of 15, Andreeva made her WTA Tour main-draw debut at the Jasmin Open in Monastir, Tunisia, after receiving a wildcard. She lost in the first round to sixth seed Anastasia Potapova in three sets.

In November, Andreeva won the W60 Meitar Open in Israel, defeating Rebecca Peterson in straight sets in the final. At 15 years and six months old, she became the third-youngest player to win an ITF singles title at W60 level or above. She finished the season with a 39–9 win–loss record and four singles titles on the ITF circuit and a ranking of No. 293.

=== 2023: Wimbledon fourth round, top 50 ===
In April 2023, Andreeva won consecutive ITF W60 titles in Chiasso and Bellinzona, Switzerland. Her victory in Chiasso made her the first player in ITF World Tennis Tour history to win two singles titles at W60 level or above before the age of 16, following her first W60 title in Meitar, Israel, in November 2022. Winning these two titles, she reached a new ranking of No. 194.

Andreeva received a wildcard into the main draw of the WTA 1000 Madrid Open. She won her first match against Leylah Fernandez, becoming the third youngest player to win a main-draw match at a WTA 1000 tournament, behind Coco Gauff and CiCi Bellis, and the second 15-year-old to defeat a top-50 opponent at a WTA 1000 tournament after Bellis. Next, she defeated No. 14 Beatriz Haddad Maia for her first top-20 win, becoming the seventh player to defeat a top-20 opponent before the age of 16 in the 21st century. On her 16th birthday, she claimed victory over another top-20 player, No. 19 Magda Linette. Though she lost in the last 16 to world No. 2 Aryna Sabalenka, her ranking jumped to No. 146.

Andreeva made her Grand Slam tournament debut at the French Open after qualifying. She defeated Alison Riske-Amritraj to record her first major win. Next, she defeated wildcard player Diane Parry. As a result, she became the seventh player in the past 30 years to reach the third round of the French Open before turning 17. She lost in the third round to No. 6 Coco Gauff in three sets. As a result, her ranking rose to No. 101.

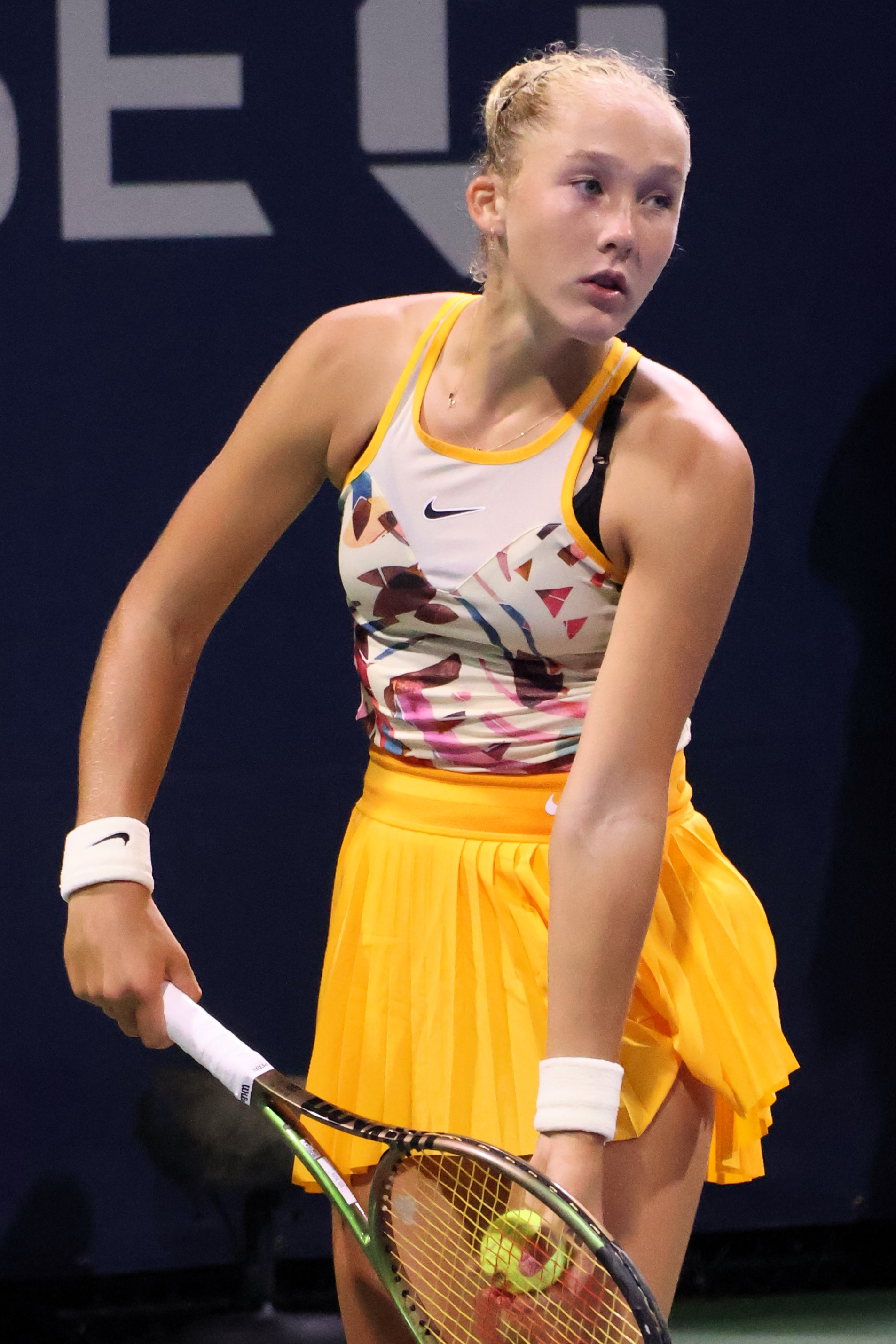
Andreeva at the 2023 US Open

Andreeva made her main-draw debut at Wimbledon after qualifying. She defeated Wang Xiyu in the first round, and reached the third round when No. 11 Barbora Krejčíková retired due to injury while trailing by a set and a double break of serve. Next, she defeated No. 23 Anastasia Potapova, becoming the youngest player to make the fourth round of Wimbledon since Coco Gauff in 2019. Despite losing to No. 18 Madison Keys in the fourth round in three sets, her ranking rose to No. 64.

At the US Open, Andreeva defeated wildcard entrant Olivia Gadecki before falling to eventual champion Coco Gauff. Entering the China Open after qualifying, she defeated No. 12 Barbora Krejčíková and Anastasia Pavlyuchenkova to reach the third round, where she lost to No. 5 Elena Rybakina in three sets. Andreeva finished the year at world No. 46 and was named WTA Newcomer of the Year.

=== 2024: French semis, Iași title, top 20 ===
Andreeva started her 2024 season at the Brisbane International. She defeated Diana Shnaider, No. 15 Liudmila Samsonova, and wildcard entrant Arina Rodionova, without dropping a set, to reach her first WTA Tour quarterfinal. She lost in the quarterfinals to Linda Nosková in straight sets. At the Australian Open, she defeated Bernarda Pera in the first round. In the second round, she defeated No. 6 Ons Jabeur for her first top-10 win, becoming the youngest player to defeat a top-10 player at the Australian Open since Coco Gauff in 2020 and the youngest player in the Open Era to hand a top-10 player a first-set bagel at a major tournament. In the third round, she defeated Diane Parry, becoming the youngest player since Coco Gauff to have made two round of 16 major appearances. Although she lost in the last 16 to No. 11 Barbora Krejčíková in three sets, her ranking rose to No. 35.

At the Madrid Open, Andreeva defeated Taylor Townsend, Linda Nosková, and No. 7 Markéta Vondroušová to reach the fourth round. On her 17th birthday, she defeated No. 13 Jasmine Paolini in straight sets to reach her first WTA 1000 quarterfinal. She lost in the quarterfinals to world No. 2 Aryna Sabalenka in straight sets.

At the French Open, Andreeva defeated Emina Bektas, No. 21 Victoria Azarenka, and Peyton Stearns to reach the fourth round, becoming the youngest player to reach the fourth round of a major on all three surfaces since Anna Kournikova in 1998. She defeated Varvara Gracheva to reach the quarterfinals, becoming the youngest woman to reach the quarterfinals at Roland Garros since Sesil Karatantcheva in 2005. She defeated world No. 2 Aryna Sabalenka in three sets to reach the semifinals, becoming the youngest player to reach the semifinals of the French Open since Martina Hingis in 1997. She lost in the semifinals to No. 15 Jasmine Paolini in straight sets. As a result, Andreeva reached a new career-high ranking of world No. 23.

Andreeva went out of Wimbledon in the first round, losing to Brenda Fruhvirtová.

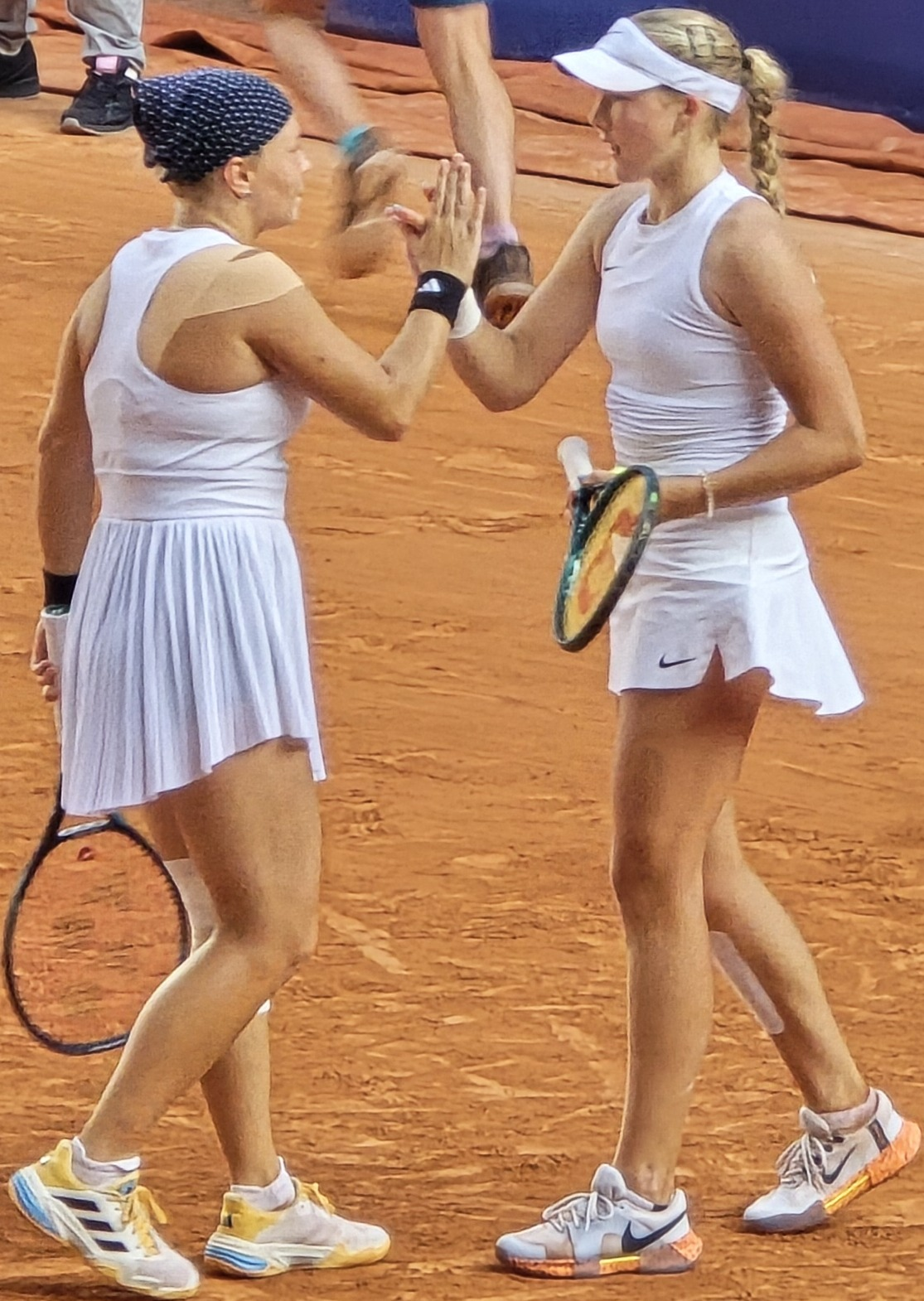
Andreeva with Diana Shnaider at the 2024 Olympic doubles final

Andreeva captured her first WTA Tour title at the Iași Open, when Elina Avanesyan retired due to injury. She became the youngest woman to win a tour-level singles title since Coco Gauff in 2021. At the Paris Olympics, Andreeva partnered with Diana Shnaider to win silver in the women's doubles, losing in the final to Sara Errani and Jasmine Paolini.

At the Cincinnati Open, Andreeva defeated No. 13 Emma Navarro, Karolína Plíšková and No. 5 Jasmine Paolini to reach her second WTA 1000 quarterfinal. She lost in the quarterfinals to world No. 1 Iga Świątek in three sets. At the US Open, she defeated Camila Osorio before losing to Ashlyn Krueger.

At the China Open, Andreeva defeated Irina-Camelia Begu, No. 20 Donna Vekić, and Magda Linette to reach her third WTA 1000 quarterfinal. She lost in the quarterfinals to No. 7 Zheng Qinwen in three sets. After the China Open, Andreeva broke into the top 20, becoming the youngest woman to achieve this milestone since Nicole Vaidišová in 2005. At the Ningbo Open, Andreeva defeated qualifier Varvara Lepchenko and lucky loser Tamara Korpatsch to reach the quarterfinals. She reached her first WTA 500 final after No. 13 Barbora Krejčíková and Karolína Muchová retired. She lost in the final to No. 11 Daria Kasatkina in three sets.

=== 2025: Two WTA 1000 titles, top 5 ===
Andreeva started her 2025 season at the Brisbane International. She overcame Anna Blinkova, No. 26 Linda Nosková, and Ons Jabeur to reached the semifinals, without dropping a set. She lost in the semifinals to world No. 1 Aryna Sabalenka in straight sets. At the same tournament in doubles, Andreeva partnered with Diana Shnaider to win her first WTA Tour doubles title, defeating Priscilla Hon and Anna Kalinskaya in the final. At the Australian Open, Andreeva overcame Marie Bouzková, Moyuka Uchijima, and No. 26 Magdalena Fręch to reach the fourth round, where she lost again to Aryna Sabalenka in straight sets.

At the Dubai Championships, Andreeva defeated Elina Avanesyan, Markéta Vondroušová, and Peyton Stearns, without dropping a set, to reach her fourth WTA 1000 quarterfinal. She defeated world No. 2 Iga Świątek in straight sets to reach her first WTA 1000 semifinal, becoming the youngest player to reach the semifinals in the tournament’s history. She defeated No. 7 Elena Rybakina in three sets to reach her first WTA 1000 final. She defeated Clara Tauson in straight sets to win her first WTA 1000 title. She became the youngest player to reach and win a WTA 1000 final since the WTA 1000 format was introduced in 2009. She also became the youngest player to beat three Grand Slam champions in a single tournament since Maria Sharapova did so in 2004. Following her win in Dubai, Andreeva made her top 10 debut, making her the youngest person to be ranked in the top 10 since Nicole Vaidišová in 2006.

At the Indian Wells, Andreeva defeated Varvara Gracheva, No. 21 Clara Tauson, and No. 7 Elena Rybakina, without dropping a set, to reach the quarterfinals. She defeated No. 23 Elina Svitolina in straight sets to reach the semifinals, becoming the youngest player to reach multiple WTA 1000 semifinals since 2009. She defeated defending champion Iga Świątek in three sets to reach the final. She defeated world No. 1 Aryna Sabalenka in three sets to claim back-to-back WTA 1000 titles. She became the tournament’s third-youngest female champion after Martina Hingis in 1998 and Serena Williams in 1999. She also became the youngest woman since Hingis in 1997 to win back-to-back WTA 1000 events and the youngest player in 40 years to defeat world No. 1 and No. 2 at a WTA event. After her victory at Indian Wells, Andreeva rose to a career-high ranking of No. 6.

At the Miami Open, Andreeva defeated Veronika Kudermetova before losing to No. 17 Amanda Anisimova. Nevertheless, at the same tournament, Andreeva won her first WTA 1000 doubles title alongside Shnaider, defeating Cristina Bucșa and Miyu Kato in the final.

At the Madrid Open, Andreeva defeated Marie Bouzkova, No. 27 Magdalena Fręch, and qualifier Yuliia Starodubtseva to reach the quarterfinals, without dropping a set. She lost in the quarterfinals to No. 4 Coco Gauff in straight sets. At the Italian Open, Andreeva defeated qualifier Emiliana Arango, Linda Nosková, and No. 23 Clara Tauson to reach the quarterfinals, where she lost again to Coco Gauff in straight sets. At the French Open, Andreeva defeated Cristina Bucșa, Ashlyn Krueger, Yulia Putintseva, and No. 17 Daria Kasatkina, without dropping a set, to reach her second straight French Open quarterfinal. She lost in the quarterfinals to wildcard entrant Loïs Boisson in straight sets.

At the Bad Homburg Open, Andreeva defeated Clara Tauson to reach the quarterfinals, where she lost to Linda Nosková in straight sets. At the Wimbledon Championships, Andreeva defeated Mayar Sherif, Lucia Bronzetti, Hailey Baptiste, and No. 10 Emma Navarro, without dropping a set, to reach her first Wimbledon quarterfinal. She became the youngest player to reach Wimbledon quarterfinals since Nicole Vaidišová in 2007. She lost in the quarterfinals to Belinda Bencic in straight sets. As a result, Andreeva broke into the top 5 on rankings, the youngest player to do so since Maria Sharapova in 2004.

At the US Open, Andreeva defeated Alycia Parks and Anastasia Potapova before losing to Taylor Townsend.

At the China Open, Andreeva defeated wildcard entrant Zhu Lin and Jéssica Bouzas Maneiro before losing to Sonay Kartal. At the Wuhan Open, she lost her opening match against Laura Siegemund. At the Ningbo Open, she lost her opening match to Zhu Lin. Due to her early losses in China, Andreeva finished the year as No. 9. Andreeva and Shnaider qualified for the doubles event at the WTA Finals, but they were eliminated in the group stages.

=== 2026: French Open and WTA Finals champion, No. 2 ===
Andreeva began her 2026 season at the Brisbane International. She defeated qualifier Olivia Gadecki and No. 12 Linda Nosková to reach the quarterfinals, where she lost to No. 26 Marta Kostyuk in straight sets.

At the Adelaide International, Andreeva defeated lucky loser Marie Bouzková, Maya Joint, No. 23 Diana Shnaider, and No. 17 Victoria Mboko to win the title, without dropping a set en route.

At the Australian Open, Andreeva defeated Donna Vekić, Maria Sakkari, and Elena-Gabriela Ruse to reach the fourth round, where she lost to No. 12 Elina Svitolina in straight sets.

At the Qatar Open, Andreeva defeated Magda Linette before losing to No. 13 Victoria Mboko. As the defending champion at the Dubai Championships, Andreeva advanced to the third round after Daria Kasatkina withdrew due to injury. She defeated Jaqueline Cristian to reach the quarterfinals, where she lost to No. 6 Amanda Anisimova in three sets.

As the defending champion at the Indian Wells, Andreeva defeated Solana Sierra before losing to Kateřina Siniaková. In Miami, she defeated McCartney Kessler and Marie Bouzkova before losing again to No. 9 Victoria Mboko.

Opening her clay season at the Linz Open, Andreeva defeated wildcard entrant Sloane Stephens, No. 29 Sorana Cîrstea, and Elena-Gabriela Ruse to reach the final. In the final, she came from a set down to defeat Anastasia Potapova and win her second title of the season.

At the Stuttgart Open, Andreeva came from a set down to defeat defending champion Jeļena Ostapenko in the first round. She defeated qualifier Alycia Parks to reach the quarterfinals. In the quarterfinals, she came from a set down to defeat No. 4 Iga Świątek. In the semifinals, she lost to No. 2 and eventual champion Elena Rybakina in straight sets.

At the Madrid Open, Andreeva defeated lucky loser Panna Udvardy and qualifier Dalma Galfi to reach the fourth round. She came from a set down to defeat Anna Bondár and reach the quarterfinals. She defeated No. 25 Leylah Fernandez and Hailey Baptiste in straight sets to reach the final. In the final, she lost to No. 23 Marta Kostyuk in straight sets. At the same tournament, she also made it into the doubles final with Diana Shnaider, losing to second seeds Kateřina Siniaková and Taylor Townsend.

At the Italian Open, Andreeva defeated Antonia Ružić, Viktorija Golubic, and No. 22 Elise Mertens to reach the quarterfinals, where she lost to No. 4 Coco Gauff in three sets. At the same event, she teamed with Shnaider to win her second WTA 1000 doubles title, defeating seventh seeds Cristina Bucșa and Nicole Melichar-Martinez in the final.

At the French Open, Andreeva defeated wildcard entrant Fiona Ferro in the first round. In the second round, she came from a set down to defeat qualifier Marina Bassols Ribera. She defeated No. 28 Marie Bouzková and Jil Teichmann in straight sets to reach her third straight French Open quarterfinal. She defeated No. 18 Sorana Cîrstea in straight sets to advance to her second major semifinal. In a rematch of their Madrid final, she defeated No. 15 Marta Kostyuk in straight sets to reach her first major final. In the final, she defeated qualifier Maja Chwalińska in straight sets to win her first major title. She became the youngest French Open champion since Monica Seles in 1992.

Moving onto the grass court swing of the season, Andreeva lost her first match since her Roland Garros triumph, going down to a straight-sets defeat against Ekaterina Alexandrova at the Bad Homburg Open. At Wimbledon, she overcame Magda Linette before losing to 2024 champion Barbora Krejčíková in the second round.

Starting her North American hard court season at the Canadian Open, Andreeva defeated Karolína Plíšková before losing to Leylah Fernandez. At the Cincinnati Open, she defeated Oleksandra Oliynykova and Janice Tjen before losing to No. 11 Marta Kostyuk in three sets. At the US Open, Andreeva defeated Janice Tjen, Eva Lys, Nikola Bartůňková, and No. 24 Anastasia Potapova to reach the quarterfinals at the US Open for the first time. In the quarterfinals, she lost again to No. 4 Coco Gauff, despite holding two match points in the second-set tiebreak.

At the China Open, Andreeva came from a set down to defeat wildcard entrant Yuan Yue in her opening match. She defeated Polina Kudermetova, Daria Snigur, No. 28 Ekaterina Alexandrova, and Nikola Bartůňková, without dropping a set, to advance to her fifth final of 2026. In the final, she lost to wildcard entrant Zheng Qinwen in straight sets. Despite the loss, Andreeva rose to a career-high No. 3 ranking, becoming the youngest player to enter the top 3 since Maria Sharapova in 2005.

Andreeva qualified for the WTA Finals in singles for the first time. At the WTA Finals in Indian Wells, Andreeva won all her three matches against Elina Svitolina, Aryna Sabalenka, and Diana Shnaider in the round-robin stage, becoming the youngest player to advance to the WTA Finals semifinals since Caroline Wozniacki in 2009. In the semifinals, she defeated Jessica Pegula. In a rematch of their group opener, she defeated Elina Svitolina again to win the title, without dropping a set en route. She became the youngest player to reach and win the WTA Finals final since Maria Sharapova in 2004. As a result, Andreeva ended the year at a new career-high of No. 2.

== Coaches ==
In January 2022, Mirra and Erika Andreeva joined the Elite Tennis Center in Cannes, France.

In April 2024, Mirra Andreeva hired Conchita Martínez to be her coach. Martínez is a former Wimbledon champion and has previously coached Garbiñe Muguruza and Karolína Plíšková.

== Career statistics ==
=== Grand Slam tournament performance timeline ===
Key
| W | F | SF | QF | #R | RR | Q# | DNQ | A | NH |

(W) winner; (F) finalist; (SF) semifinalist; (QF) quarterfinalist; (#R) rounds 4, 3, 2, 1; (RR) round-robin stage; (Q#) qualification round; (DNQ) did not qualify; (A) absent; (NH) not held; (SR) strike rate (events won / competed); (W–L) win–loss record.
To avoid confusion and double counting, these charts are updated at the conclusion of a tournament or when the player's participation has ended.

==== Singles ====
Current through the 2026 US Open.

| Tournament | 2023 | 2024 | 2025 | 2026 | SR | W–L | Win % |
|---|---|---|---|---|---|---|---|
| Australian Open | A | 4R | 4R | 4R | 0 / 3 | 9–3 | 75% |
| French Open | 3R | SF | QF | W | 1 / 4 | 18–3 | 86% |
| Wimbledon | 4R | 1R | QF | 2R | 0 / 4 | 8–4 | 67% |
| US Open | 2R | 2R | 3R | QF | 0 / 4 | 8–4 | 67% |
| Win–Loss | 6–3 | 9–4 | 13–4 | 15–3 | 1 / 15 | 43–14 | 75% |

==== Doubles ====
Current through the 2026 US Open.

| Tournament | 2023 | 2024 | 2025 | 2026 | SR | W–L | Win % |
|---|---|---|---|---|---|---|---|
| Australian Open | A | 1R | SF | A | 0 / 2 | 4–2 | 67% |
| French Open | A | QF | SF | A | 0 / 2 | 7–2 | 78% |
| Wimbledon | A | 1R | 3R | A | 0 / 2 | 2–2 | 50% |
| US Open | A | 3R | QF | A | 0 / 2 | 5–2 | 71% |
| Win–Loss | 0–0 | 5–4 | 13–4 | 0–0 | 0 / 8 | 18–8 | 69% |

=== Grand Slam tournament finals ===
==== Singles: 1 (1 title) ====
| Result | Year | Tournament | Surface | Opponent | Score |
|---|---|---|---|---|---|
| Win | 2026 | French Open | Clay | (Poland) Maja Chwalińska | 6–3, 6–2 |

=== Year-end championships (WTA Finals) ===
==== Singles: 1 (title) ====
| Result | Year | Tournament | Surface | Opponent | Score |
|---|---|---|---|---|---|
| Win | 2026 | WTA Finals | Hard | (Ukraine) Elina Svitolina | 7–5, 6–3 |

=== Summer Olympics ===
==== Doubles: 1 (silver medal) ====
| Result | Year | Tournament | Surface | Partner | Opponents | Score |
|---|---|---|---|---|---|---|
| Silver | 2024 | Paris Olympics | Clay | Diana Shnaider | (Italy) Sara Errani (Italy) Jasmine Paolini | 6–2, 1–6, [7–10] |

=== WTA 1000 tournaments ===
==== Singles: 4 (2 titles, 2 runner-ups) ====
| Result | Year | Tournament | Surface | Opponent | Score |
|---|---|---|---|---|---|
| Win | 2025 | Dubai Championships | Hard | (Denmark) Clara Tauson | 7–6^{(7–1)}, 6–1 |
| Win | 2025 | Indian Wells Open | Hard | Aryna Sabalenka | 2–6, 6–4, 6–3 |
| Loss | 2026 | Madrid Open | Clay | (Ukraine) Marta Kostyuk | 3–6, 5–7 |
| Loss | 2026 | China Open | Hard | (China) Zheng Qinwen | 5–7, 4–6 |

==== Doubles: 3 (2 titles, 1 runner-up) ====
| Result | Year | Tournament | Surface | Partner | Opponents | Score |
|---|---|---|---|---|---|---|
| Win | 2025 | Miami Open | Hard | Diana Shnaider | (Spain) Cristina Bucșa (Japan) Miyu Kato | 6–3, 6–7^{(5–7)}, [10–2] |
| Loss | 2026 | Madrid Open | Clay | Diana Shnaider | (Czech Republic) Kateřina Siniaková (United States) Taylor Townsend | 6–7^{(2–7)}, 2–6 |
| Win | 2026 | Italian Open | Clay | Diana Shnaider | (Spain) Cristina Bucșa (United States) Nicole Melichar-Martinez | 6–3, 6–3 |
