= 2022 Iași Open =

- Date: 11–17 July (men); 1–7 August (women)
- Edition: 3rd (men); 1st (women)
- Category: ATP Challenger 100 (men); WTA 125 (women)
- Draw: 32S/24Q/16D (men); 32S/15Q/16D (women)
- Prize money: €90,280 (men) $115,000 (women)
- Surface: Clay
- Location: Iași, Romania
- Venue: Baza sportiva Ciric

Champions

Men's singles
- (Brazil) Felipe Meligeni Alves

Women's singles
- (Romania) Ana Bogdan

Men's doubles
- (France) Geoffrey Blancaneaux / (Argentina) Renzo Olivo

Women's doubles
- Darya Astakhova / (Romania) Andreea Roșca
← 2021 ·	Iași Open	· 2023 →

The 2022 Iași Open was a professional tennis tournament played on clay courts. It was the third edition of the men's tournament which was part of the 2022 ATP Challenger Tour and first edition of the women's tournament which was part of 2022 WTA 125 tournaments. It took place in Iași, Romania between 11 and 17 July 2022 for the men and between 1 and 7 August for the women.

== Men's singles main-draw entrants ==
=== Seeds ===
Country	Player	Rank^{1}	Seed
CZE	Jiří Lehečka	72	1
ESP	Pablo Andújar	100	2
CZE	Zdeněk Kolář	119	3
	Alexander Shevchenko	158	4
FRA	Geoffrey Blancaneaux	165	5
CZE	Dalibor Svrčina	178	6
ARG	Renzo Olivo	186	7
BRA	Felipe Meligeni Alves	197	8

- ^{1} Rankings as of 27 June 2022.

=== Other entrants ===
The following players received wildcards into the singles main draw:

- (Romania) Marius Copil
- (Romania) Cezar Crețu
- (Romania) Nicholas David Ionel

The following players received entry into the singles main draw as alternates:

- (Romania) Filip Cristian Jianu
- (Ukraine) Oleksii Krutykh
- (Austria) Lucas Miedler
- (Spain) Nikolás Sánchez Izquierdo
- (Germany) Louis Wessels

The following players received entry from the qualifying draw:

- (Belgium) Joris De Loore
- (Romania) Nicolae Frunză
- (Romania) Ștefan Paloși
- (Brazil) José Pereira
- (Brazil) Matheus Pucinelli de Almeida
- (Moldova) Ilya Snițari

The following player received entry as lucky losers:

- Andrey Chepelev
- (Ukraine) Oleg Prihodko

== Women's singles main-draw entrants ==
=== Seeds ===
Country	Player	Rank^{1}	Seed
SUI	Viktorija Golubic	103	1
HUN	Panna Udvardy	106	2
ROU	Ana Bogdan	108	3
SRB	Olga Danilović	111	4
BRA	Laura Pigossi	113	5
FRA	Kristina Mladenovic	116	6
ROU	Irina Bara	125	7
GEO	Ekaterine Gorgodze	126	8

- ^{1} Rankings as of 25 July 2022.

=== Other entrants ===
The following players received wildcards into the singles main draw:

- (Romania) Andreea Prisăcariu
- (Croatia) Antonia Ružić
- (Romania) Oana Georgeta Simion
- (Romania) Briana Szabó

The following players received entry from the qualifying draw:

- Darya Astakhova
- (Romania) Cristina Dinu
- (Romania) Ilona Georgiana Ghioroaie
- (Japan) Yuki Naito

The following players received entry as lucky losers:

- (Romania) Lavinia Tănăsie
- (Australia) Olivia Tjandramulia

=== Withdrawals ===
Before the tournament

- (Austria) Julia Grabher → replaced by (Argentina) Nadia Podoroska
- (Netherlands) Arianne Hartono → replaced by (Romania) Alexandra Cadanțu-Ignatik
- (Switzerland) Ylena In-Albon → replaced by (Bosnia and Herzegovina) Dea Herdželaš
- (Romania) Gabriela Lee → replaced by (Romania) Lavinia Tănăsie
- (Brazil) Laura Pigossi → replaced by (Australia) Olivia Tjandramulia
- (Slovakia) Anna Karolína Schmiedlová → replaced by (Greece) Despina Papamichail

== Women's doubles main-draw entrants ==
=== Seeds ===
Country	Player	Country	Player	Rank^{†}	Seed
CZE	Anastasia Dețiuc	FRA	Elixane Lechemia	242	1
	Angelina Gabueva		Anastasia Zakharova	275	2
INA	Beatrice Gumulya	AUS	Olivia Tjandramulia	347	3
HUN	Réka Luca Jani	HUN	Panna Udvardy	348	4

† Rankings are as of 25 July 2022

=== Other entrants ===
The following pair received a wildcard entry into main draw:

- (Romania) Daria Munteanu / (Romania) Catrinel Onciulescu

The following pair received entry using a protected ranking:

- (Chinese Taipei) Hsieh Yu-chieh / (China) Lu Jingjing

=== Withdrawals ===
Before the tournament

- (Poland) Maja Chwalińska / (Czech Republic) Jesika Malečková → replaced by (Romania) Andreea Prisăcariu / (Bosnia and Herzegovina) Anita Wagner
- (Czech Republic) Anastasia Dețiuc / (Czech Republic) Miriam Kolodziejová → replaced by (Czech Republic) Anastasia Dețiuc / (France) Elixane Lechemia
- (France) Elixane Lechemia / (Romania) Laura Ioana Paar → replaced by (Argentina) Paula Ormaechea / (India) Prarthana Thombare

== Champions ==
=== Men's singles ===
- (Brazil) Felipe Meligeni Alves def. (Spain) Pablo Andújar 6–3, 4–6, 6–2.

=== Women's singles ===
- (Romania) Ana Bogdan def. (Hungary) Panna Udvardy 6–2, 3–6, 6–1

=== Men's doubles ===
- (France) Geoffrey Blancaneaux / (Argentina) Renzo Olivo def. (Ecuador) Diego Hidalgo / (Colombia) Cristian Rodríguez 6–4, 2–6, [10–6].

=== Women's doubles ===
- Darya Astakhova / (Romania) Andreea Roșca def. (Hungary) Réka Luca Jani / (Hungary) Panna Udvardy 7–5, 5–7, [10–7]
