= 2022 Iași Open – Women's singles =

Women's singles
- 2022 Iași Open

Final
- Champion: (Romania) Ana Bogdan
- Runner-up: (Hungary) Panna Udvardy
- Score: 6–2, 3–6, 6–1

Events
Singles	men	women
Doubles	men	women
Iași Open	· 2023 →

This was the first edition of the tournament.

Ana Bogdan won her first WTA Challenger title, defeating Panna Udvardy in the final, 6–2, 3–6, 6–1.

== Seeds ==
1. (Switzerland) Viktorija Golubic (first round)
2. (Hungary) Panna Udvardy (final)
3. (Romania) Ana Bogdan (champion)
4. (Serbia) Olga Danilović (second round)
5. (Brazil) Laura Pigossi (withdrew)
6. (France) Kristina Mladenovic (quarterfinals)
7. (Romania) Irina Bara (first round)
8. (Georgia (country)) Ekaterine Gorgodze (quarterfinals)

== Draw ==
=== Key ===
- Q = Qualifier
- WC = Wild card
- LL = Lucky loser
- Alt = Alternate
- ITF = ITF entry
- PR = Protected ranking
- SR = Special ranking
- SE = Special exempt
- JE = Junior exempt
- JR = Junior Accelerator Programme entrant
- CO = College Accelerator Programme entrant
- NG = Next Gen Accelerator Program entrant
- w/o = Walkover
- r = Retired
- d = Defaulted

=== Finals ===
Semifinals
Q	Darya Astakhova	6^{5}	4
3	(Romania) Ana Bogdan	7^{7}	6
(Poland) Maja Chwalińska	3	6^{2}
2	(Hungary) Panna Udvardy	6	7^{7}

Final
3	(Romania) Ana Bogdan	6	3	6
2	(Hungary) Panna Udvardy	2	6	1

=== Top half ===
First round
1	(Switzerland) V Golubic	3	4
Q	(Japan) Y Naito	6	6
(Argentina) P Ormaechea	7	6
LL	(Romania) L Tănăsie	5	3
Q	(Romania) C Dinu	1	3
(Romania) M Buzărnescu	6	5^{r}
Q	D Astakhova	6	6
7	(Romania) I Bara	3	3
3	(Romania) A Bogdan	6	6
WC	(Romania) OG Simion	0	2
WC	(Romania) A Prisăcariu	0	3
A Zakharova	6	6
(Argentina) N Podoroska	6	6
Q	(Romania) IG Ghioroaie	2	3
(France) C Burel	5	0
8	(Georgia (country)) E Gorgodze	7	6

Second round
Q	(Japan) Y Naito	3	5
(Argentina) P Ormaechea	6	7
Q	(Romania) C Dinu	2	2
Q	D Astakhova	6	6
3	(Romania) A Bogdan	6	6
A Zakharova	1	2
(Argentina) N Podoroska	4	2
8	(Georgia (country)) E Gorgodze	6	6

Quarterfinals
(Argentina) P Ormaechea	4	0
Q	D Astakhova	6	6
3	(Romania) A Bogdan	6	6
8	(Georgia (country)) E Gorgodze	1	2

Semifinals
Q	D Astakhova	6^{5}	4
3	(Romania) A Bogdan	7^{7}	6

=== Bottom half ===
First round
LL	(Australia) O Tjandramulia	0	0
(Spain) R Masarova	6	6
WC	(Croatia) A Ružić	3	4
(Germany) N Schunk	6	6
(Poland) M Chwalińska	6	6
(Bosnia and Herzegovina) D Herdželaš	2	1
(Spain) A Lázaro García	6^{1}	6	3
4	(Serbia) O Danilović	7^{7}	4	6
6	(France) K Mladenovic	2	7^{7}	6
(Croatia) T Lukas	6	6^{5}	3
(Romania) A Cadanțu-Ignatik	6	6
N Vikhlyantseva	4	3
(Hungary) RL Jani	6	6
WC	(Romania) B Szabó	1	2
(Greece) D Papamichail	3	5
2	(Hungary) P Udvardy	6	7

Second round
(Spain) R Masarova	4	7^{7}	6
(Germany) N Schunk	6	6^{5}	4
(Poland) M Chwalińska	7^{7}	6
4	(Serbia) O Danilović	6^{4}	4
6	(France) K Mladenovic	7	6
(Romania) A Cadanțu-Ignatik	5	3
(Hungary) RL Jani	0	6^{6}
2	(Hungary) P Udvardy	6	7^{8}

Quarterfinals
(Spain) R Masarova	3	6	2
(Poland) M Chwalińska	6	4	6
6	(France) K Mladenovic	1	2
2	(Hungary) P Udvardy	6	6

Semifinals
(Poland) M Chwalińska	3	6^{2}
2	(Hungary) P Udvardy	6	7^{7}

== Qualifying ==
=== Seeds ===
1. (Japan) Yuki Naito (qualified)
2. Darya Astakhova (qualified)
3. (Romania) Cristina Dinu (qualified)
4. (Romania) Ilona Georgiana Ghioroaie (qualified)
5. (Romania) Andreea Roșca (first round)
6. (Venezuela) Andrea Gámiz (first round, withdrew)
7. (Romania) Elena-Teodora Cadar (qualifying competition)
8. (Romania) Miriam Bulgaru (first round)

=== Qualifiers ===
1. (Japan) Yuki Naito
2. Darya Astakhova
3. (Romania) Cristina Dinu
4. (Romania) Ilona Georgiana Ghioroaie

=== Lucky losers ===
1. (Romania) Lavinia Tănăsie
2. (Australia) Olivia Tjandramulia

=== Draw ===
==== First qualifier ====
First round					Qualifying competition
					1	(Japan) Yuki Naito	6	6
					7	(Romania) Elena-Teodora Cadar	4	2
	(Indonesia) Beatrice Gumulya	3	7	4	7	(Romania) Elena-Teodora Cadar	4	2
7	(Romania) Elena-Teodora Cadar	6	5	6

==== Second qualifier ====
First round
2	Darya Astakhova	6	6
WC	(Romania) Ștefana Lazăr	1	1
(Australia) Olivia Tjandramulia	w/o
6	(Venezuela) Andrea Gámiz

Qualifying competition
2	Darya Astakhova	6	6
(Australia) Olivia Tjandramulia	2	4

==== Third qualifier ====
First round
3	(Romania) Cristina Dinu	6	6
WC	(Romania) Camelia Hristea	2	0
(Romania) Lavinia Tănăsie	6	4	6
5	(Romania) Andreea Roșca	2	6	1

Qualifying competition
3	(Romania) Cristina Dinu	6	6
(Romania) Lavinia Tănăsie	3	4

==== Fourth qualifier ====
First round
4	(Romania) Ilona Georgiana Ghioroaie	6	6
(Romania) Ilinca Amariei	0	2
PR	(China) Lu Jingjing	7^{7}	5	7
8	(Romania) Miriam Bulgaru	6^{5}	7	5

Qualifying competition
4	(Romania) Ilona Georgiana Ghioroaie	6	7^{7}
PR	(China) Lu Jingjing	2	6^{3}
