= 2023 Iași Open – Women's doubles =

Women's doubles
- 2023 Iași Open

Final
- Champions: (Slovenia) Veronika Erjavec (Slovenia) Dalila Jakupović
- Runners-up: (Romania) Irina Bara (Romania) Monica Niculescu
- Score: 6–4, 6–4

Events
| Singles | men | women |
| Doubles | men | women |
| ← 2022 · | Iași Open | · 2024 → |

Veronika Erjavec and Dalila Jakupović won the women's doubles title at the 2023 Iași Open, defeating Irina Bara and Monica Niculescu in the final, 6–4, 6–4.

Darya Astakhova and Andreea Roșca were the reigning champions, but chose not to defend the title.

== Seeds ==
1. (Romania) Irina Bara / (Romania) Monica Niculescu (final)
2. (Romania) Oana Gavrilă / (Australia) Olivia Tjandramulia (quarterfinals)

== Draw ==
=== Key ===
- Q = Qualifier
- WC = Wild card
- LL = Lucky loser
- Alt = Alternate
- ITF = ITF entry
- PR = Protected ranking
- SR = Special ranking
- SE = Special exempt
- JE = Junior exempt
- JR = Junior Accelerator Programme entrant
- CO = College Accelerator Programme entrant
- NG = Next Gen Accelerator Program entrant
- w/o = Walkover
- r = Retired
- d = Defaulted

=== Draw ===
Quarterfinals
1 | (Romania) I Bara (Romania) M Niculescu | 6 | 7
WC | (Romania) I Amariei (Romania) A Todoni | 1 | 5
A Tikhonova (Netherlands) R van der Hoek | 6 | 4 | [9]
(Switzerland) C Perrin (United States) A Rogers | 3 | 6 | [11]
(Slovenia) V Erjavec (Slovenia) D Jakupović | 6 | 6
(Indonesia) J Rompies; E Yashina | 3 | 1
(Montenegro) D Kovinić (Brazil) L Pigossi | 5 | 6 | [10]
2 | (Romania) O Gavrilă (Australia) O Tjandramulia | 7 | 2 | [5]

Semifinals
1 | (Romania) I Bara (Romania) M Niculescu | 6 | 6
(Switzerland) C Perrin (United States) A Rogers | 2 | 1
(Slovenia) V Erjavec (Slovenia) D Jakupović | 6 | 5 | [10]
(Montenegro) D Kovinić (Brazil) L Pigossi | 3 | 7 | [6]

Final
1 | (Romania) I Bara (Romania) M Niculescu | 4 | 4
(Slovenia) V Erjavec (Slovenia) D Jakupović | 6 | 6
