= 2020 Iași Open =

- Date: 14–20 September
- Edition: 1st
- Draw: 32S / 16D
- Surface: Clay
- Location: Iași, Romania

Champions

Singles
- (Spain) Carlos Taberner

Doubles
- (Brazil) Rafael Matos / (Brazil) João Menezes
Iași Open	· 2021 →

The 2020 Iași Open was a professional tennis tournament played on clay courts. It was the first edition of the tournament which was part of the 2020 ATP Challenger Tour. It took place in Iași, Romania between 14 and 20 September 2020.

== Singles main-draw entrants ==
=== Seeds ===
Country	Player	Rank^{1}	Seed
ESP	Pablo Andújar	56	1
ESP	Jaume Munar	105	2
FRA	Arthur Rinderknech	156	3
AUT	Jurij Rodionov	172	4
ESP	Carlos Taberner	181	5
FRA	Enzo Couacaud	183	6
BRA	João Menezes	189	7
ROU	Marius Copil	191	8

- ^{1} Rankings as of 31 August 2020.

=== Other entrants ===
The following players received wildcards into the singles main draw:

- (Romania) Cezar Crețu
- (Romania) Nicholas David Ionel
- (Romania) Filip Cristian Jianu

The following player received entry into the singles main draw using a protected ranking:

- (Belgium) Arthur De Greef

The following players received entry into the singles main draw as special exempts:

- (Spain) Pablo Andújar
- (Switzerland) Marc-Andrea Hüsler

The following players received entry from the qualifying draw:

- (Argentina) Tomás Martín Etcheverry
- (France) Matteo Martineau
- (Brazil) Felipe Meligeni Alves
- (Poland) Kacper Żuk

== Champions ==
=== Singles ===
- (Spain) Carlos Taberner def. (France) Mathias Bourgue 6–4, 7–6^{(7–4)}.

=== Doubles ===
- (Brazil) Rafael Matos / (Brazil) João Menezes def. (Philippines) Treat Huey / (United States) Nathaniel Lammons 6–2, 6–2.
