= 2022 Iași Open – Men's singles =

Men's singles
- 2022 Iași Open

Final
- Champion: (Brazil) Felipe Meligeni Alves
- Runner-up: (Spain) Pablo Andújar
- Score: 6–3, 4–6, 6–2

Events
Singles	men	women
Doubles	men	women
← 2021 ·	Iași Open	· 2023 →

Zdeněk Kolář was the defending champion but retired from his first round match with Frederico Ferreira Silva.

Felipe Meligeni Alves won the title after defeating Pablo Andújar 6–3, 4–6, 6–2 in the final.

== Seeds ==
1. (Czech Republic) Jiří Lehečka (quarterfinals)
2. (Spain) Pablo Andújar (final)
3. (Czech Republic) Zdeněk Kolář (first round, retired)
4. Alexander Shevchenko (first round)
5. (France) Geoffrey Blancaneaux (quarterfinals)
6. (Czech Republic) Dalibor Svrčina (second round)
7. (Argentina) Renzo Olivo (first round)
8. (Brazil) Felipe Meligeni Alves (champion)

== Draw ==
=== Key ===
- Q = Qualifier
- WC = Wild card
- LL = Lucky loser
- Alt = Alternate
- ITF = ITF entry
- PR = Protected ranking
- SR = Special ranking
- SE = Special exempt
- JE = Junior exempt
- JR = Junior Accelerator Programme entrant
- CO = College Accelerator Programme entrant
- NG = Next Gen Accelerator Program entrant
- w/o = Walkover
- r = Retired
- d = Defaulted

=== Finals ===
Semifinals
(Italy) Luciano Darderi	2	2
8	(Brazil) Felipe Meligeni Alves	6	6
Q	(Brazil) Matheus Pucinelli de Almeida	6	2	3
2	(Spain) Pablo Andújar	3	6	6

Final
8	(Brazil) Felipe Meligeni Alves	6	4	6
2	(Spain) Pablo Andújar	3	6	2

=== Top half ===
First round
1	(Czech Republic) J Lehečka	6	7^{7}
Q	(Moldova) I Snițari	4	6^{5}
LL	Andrey Chepelev	6	2	4
(Brazil) T Seyboth Wild	2	6	0^{r}
Q	(Romania) N Frunză	1	5
(Italy) L Darderi	6	7
Alt	(Austria) L Miedler	4	6	2
6	(Czech Republic) D Svrčina	6	3	6
3	(Czech Republic) Z Kolář	4	4^{r}
(Portugal) F Ferreira Silva	6	4
WC	(Romania) M Copil	6	7^{7}
LL	(Ukraine) O Prihodko	2	6^{3}
Alt	(Spain) N Sánchez Izquierdo	6	6
(Italy) M Arnaldi	2	3
Q	(Brazil) J Pereira	5	6	1
8	(Brazil) F Meligeni Alves	7	1	6

Second round
1	(Czech Republic) J Lehečka	6	4	6
LL	A Chepelev	4	6	4
(Italy) L Darderi	5	7	7^{8}
6	(Czech Republic) D Svrčina	7	5	6^{6}
(Portugal) F Ferreira Silva	7^{7}	7^{7}
WC	(Romania) M Copil	6^{4}	6^{2}
Alt	(Spain) N Sánchez Izquierdo	2	4
8	(Brazil) F Meligeni Alves	6	6

Quarterfinals
1	(Czech Republic) J Lehečka	6	6^{1}	4
(Italy) L Darderi	4	7^{7}	6
(Portugal) F Ferreira Silva	4	6^{5}
8	(Brazil) F Meligeni Alves	6	7^{7}

Semifinals
(Italy) L Darderi	2	2
8	(Brazil) F Meligeni Alves	6	6

=== Bottom half ===
First round
5	(France) G Blancaneaux	6	7
Alt	(Romania) FC Jianu	2	5
(Croatia) B Ćorić	4	2
WC	(Romania) ND Ionel	6	6
Q	(Romania) Ștefan Paloși	2	2
Q	(Belgium) J De Loore	6	6
Q	(Brazil) M Pucinelli de Almeida	6	6
4	A Shevchenko	1	4
7	(Argentina) R Olivo	3	6	4
(Slovakia) L Klein	6	3	6
(Brazil) D Dutra da Silva	6	6^{4}	6^{3}
Alt	(Ukraine) O Krutykh	2	7^{7}	7^{7}
Alt	(Germany) L Wessels	6	6
WC	(Romania) C Crețu	4	2
(Spain) N Álvarez Varona	4	4
2	(Spain) P Andújar	6	6

Second round
5	(France) G Blancaneaux	6	6
WC	(Romania) ND Ionel	1	2
Q	(Belgium) J De Loore	3	7^{7}	4
Q	(Brazil) M Pucinelli de Almeida	6	6^{5}	6
(Slovakia) L Klein	6	6
Alt	(Ukraine) O Krutykh	3	4
Alt	(Germany) L Wessels	2	4
2	(Spain) P Andújar	6	6

Quarterfinals
5	(France) G Blancaneaux	4	4
Q	(Brazil) M Pucinelli de Almeida	6	6
(Slovakia) L Klein	3	4
2	(Spain) P Andújar	6	6

Semifinals
Q	(Brazil) M Pucinelli de Almeida	6	2	3
2	(Spain) P Andújar	3	6	6
