= 2023 Iași Open =

- Date: 10–16 July (men); 17–23 July (women)
- Edition: 4th (men); 2nd (women)
- Category: ATP Challenger 100 (men); WTA 125 (women)
- Draw: 32S/24Q/16D (men); 32S/16Q/8D (women)
- Prize money: €118,000 (men) $115,000 (women)
- Surface: Clay
- Location: Iași, Romania
- Venue: Baza sportiva Ciric

Champions

Men's singles
- (France) Hugo Gaston

Women's singles
- (Romania) Ana Bogdan

Men's doubles
- (Colombia) Nicolás Barrientos / (Pakistan) Aisam-ul-Haq Qureshi

Women's doubles
- (Slovenia) Veronika Erjavec / (Slovenia) Dalila Jakupović
- Iași Open

The 2023 Iași Open was a professional tennis tournament played on outdoor clay courts. It was the fourth edition of the men's tournament which is part of the 2023 ATP Challenger Tour and second edition of the women's tournament which is part of 2023 WTA 125 tournaments. It took place in Iași, Romania between 10 and 16 July 2023 for the men and between 17 and 23 July for the women.

== Men's singles main-draw entrants ==
=== Seeds ===
Country	Player	Rank^{1}	Seed
MDA	Radu Albot	107	1
CZE	Tomáš Macháč	108	2
HUN	Zsombor Piros	113	3
CHI	Cristian Garín	124	4
FRA	Hugo Gaston	137	5
FRA	Enzo Couacaud	158	6
CZE	Zdeněk Kolář	173	7
UKR	Vitaliy Sachko	190	8

- ^{1} Rankings as of 3 July 2023.

=== Other entrants ===
The following players received wildcards into the singles main draw:

- (Romania) ~~Cezar Crețu~~
- (Romania) Filip Cristian Jianu
- (Spain) Bernabé Zapata Miralles

The following player received entry into the singles main draw using a protected ranking:

- (Uruguay) Pablo Cuevas

The following players received entry into the singles main draw as alternates:

- (Canada) Steven Diez
- (Monaco) Valentin Vacherot
- (Serbia) Miljan Zekić

The following players received entry from the qualifying draw:

- Andrey Chepelev
- (Romania) Sebastian Gima
- (North Macedonia) Kalin Ivanovski
- (France) Kyrian Jacquet
- (Spain) Àlex Martí Pujolràs
- (Argentina) Juan Bautista Otegui

The following player received entry as a lucky loser:

- (Czech Republic) Michael Vrbenský

== Women's singles main-draw entrants ==
=== Seeds ===
Country	Player	Rank^{1}	Seed
ROU	Irina-Camelia Begu	30	1
ROU	Ana Bogdan	57	2
HUN	Panna Udvardy	83	3
MNE	Danka Kovinić	90	4
SUI	Simona Waltert	116	5
SUI	Jil Teichmann	121	6
BRA	Laura Pigossi	134	7
SLO	Tamara Zidanšek	145	8

- ^{1} Rankings as of 3 July 2023.

=== Other entrants ===
The following players received wildcards into the singles main draw:

- (Romania) Ilinca Amariei
- (Romania) Irina-Camelia Begu
- ~~Kristina Dmitruk~~
- (Romania) Andreea Prisăcariu
- (Romania) Anca Todoni

The following players received entry from the qualifying draw:

- (Slovenia) Veronika Erjavec
- (Turkey) İpek Öz
- Anastasia Tikhonova
- Ekaterina Yashina

The following players received entry as lucky losers:

- (Romania) Oana Gavrilă
- (Switzerland) Conny Perrin

=== Withdrawals ===
- Kristina Dmitruk → replaced by (Romania) Oana Gavrilă
- (Switzerland) Ylena In-Albon → replaced by (Switzerland) Conny Perrin

== Women's doubles main-draw entrants ==
=== Seeds ===
Country	Player	Country	Player	Rank^{†}	Seed
ROU	Irina Bara	ROU	Monica Niculescu	194	1
ROU	Oana Gavrilă	AUS	Olivia Tjandramulia	262	2

† Rankings are as of 3 July 2023

=== Other entrants ===
The following pair received a wildcard entry into main draw:

- (Romania) Ilinca Amariei / (Romania) Anca Todoni

== Champions ==
=== Men's singles ===
- (France) Hugo Gaston def. (Spain) Bernabé Zapata Miralles 3–6, 6–0, 6–4.

=== Women's singles ===
- (Romania) Ana Bogdan def. (Romania) Irina-Camelia Begu, 6–2, 6–3

=== Men's doubles ===
- (Colombia) Nicolás Barrientos / (Pakistan) Aisam-ul-Haq Qureshi def. (Romania) Gabi Adrian Boitan / (Romania) Bogdan Pavel 6–3, 6–3.

=== Women's doubles ===
- (Slovenia) Veronika Erjavec / (Slovenia) Dalila Jakupović def. (Romania) Irina Bara / (Romania) Monica Niculescu 6–4, 6–4
