= 2020 Iași Open – Singles =

Singles
- 2020 Iași Open

Final
- Champion: (Spain) Carlos Taberner
- Runner-up: (France) Mathias Bourgue
- Score: 6–4, 7–6^{(7–4)}

Events
Singles	Doubles
Iași Open	· 2021 →

This was the first edition of the tournament.

Carlos Taberner won the title after defeating Mathias Bourgue 6–4, 7–6^{(7–4)} in the final.

== Seeds ==
1. (Spain) Pablo Andújar (semifinals)
2. (Spain) Jaume Munar (semifinals)
3. (France) Arthur Rinderknech (second round)
4. (Austria) Jurij Rodionov (quarterfinals)
5. (Spain) Carlos Taberner (champion)
6. (France) Enzo Couacaud (first round)
7. (Brazil) João Menezes (quarterfinals)
8. (Romania) Marius Copil (first round)

== Draw ==
=== Key ===
- Q = Qualifier
- WC = Wild card
- LL = Lucky loser
- Alt = Alternate
- ITF = ITF entry
- PR = Protected ranking
- SR = Special ranking
- SE = Special exempt
- JE = Junior exempt
- JR = Junior Accelerator Programme entrant
- CO = College Accelerator Programme entrant
- NG = Next Gen Accelerator Program entrant
- w/o = Walkover
- r = Retired
- d = Defaulted

=== Finals ===
Semifinals
1/SE	(Spain) Pablo Andújar	3	6	3
(France) Mathias Bourgue	6	3	6
5	(Spain) Carlos Taberner	5	6	7^{7}
2	(Spain) Jaume Munar	7	1	6^{2}

Final
(France) Mathias Bourgue	4	6^{4}
5	(Spain) Carlos Taberner	6	7^{7}

=== Top half ===
First round
1/SE	(Spain) P Andújar	6	6
(France) A Müller	4	0
(Turkey) C İlkel	2	4
(Tunisia) M Jaziri	6	6
PR	(Belgium) A De Greef	1	4
(Argentina) F Cerúndolo	6	6
Q	(Brazil) F Meligeni Alves	1	6	6
6	(France) E Couacaud	6	2	3
4	(Austria) J Rodionov	4	6	7
(France) G Blancaneaux	6	1	5
(France) Q Halys	6	2	3
Q	(Argentina) TM Etcheverry	4	6	6
(France) M Bourgue	6	7^{7}
Q	(France) M Martineau	1	6^{1}
(Chile) MT Barrios Vera	5	6	6
8	(Romania) M Copil	7	3	0

Second round
1/SE	(Spain) P Andújar	6	7
(Tunisia) M Jaziri	2	5
(Argentina) F Cerúndolo	3	7^{7}	3
Q	(Brazil) F Meligeni Alves	6	6^{2}	6
4	(Austria) J Rodionov	6	6
Q	(Argentina) TM Etcheverry	3	4
(France) M Bourgue	6	6
(Chile) MT Barrios Vera	1	3

Quarterfinals
1/SE	(Spain) P Andújar	6	6^{5}	6
Q	(Brazil) F Meligeni Alves	1	7^{7}	2
4	(Austria) J Rodionov	2	3
(France) M Bourgue	6	6

Semifinals
1/SE	(Spain) P Andújar	3	6	3
(France) M Bourgue	6	3	6

=== Bottom half ===
First round
5	(Spain) C Taberner	6	6
(Spain) N Kuhn	3	2
Q	(Poland) K Żuk	6	6
WC	(Romania) ND Ionel	2	0
(Russia) E Karlovskiy	3	6	2
(Spain) A Menéndez Maceiras	6	3	6
SE	(Switzerland) M-A Hüsler	3	4
3	(France) A Rinderknech	6	6
7	(Brazil) J Menezes	6	6
(France) H Grenier	4	4
(Russia) T Gabashvili	4	6	2
WC	(Romania) FC Jianu	6	4	6
WC	(Romania) C Crețu	2	6	6
(Japan) H Moriya	6	3	4
(Canada) P Polansky	4	2
2	(Spain) J Munar	6	6

Second round
5	(Spain) C Taberner	6	4	6
Q	(Poland) K Żuk	2	6	3
(Spain) A Menéndez Maceiras	6	6^{9}	7^{8}
3	(France) A Rinderknech	2	7^{11}	6^{6}
7	(Brazil) J Menezes	7^{7}	6
WC	(Romania) FC Jianu	6^{3}	2
WC	(Romania) C Crețu	1	4
2	(Spain) J Munar	6	6

Quarterfinals
5	(Spain) C Taberner	1	6	6
(Spain) A Menéndez Maceiras	6	0	1
7	(Brazil) J Menezes	5	6^{2}
2	(Spain) J Munar	7	7^{7}

Semifinals
5	(Spain) C Taberner	5	6	7^{7}
2	(Spain) J Munar	7	1	6^{2}
