= 2020 Iași Open – Doubles =

Doubles
- 2020 Iași Open

Final
- Champions: (Brazil) Rafael Matos (Brazil) João Menezes
- Runners-up: (Philippines) Treat Huey (United States) Nathaniel Lammons
- Score: 6–2, 6–2

Events
Singles	Doubles
Iași Open	· 2021 →

This was the first edition of the tournament.

Rafael Matos and João Menezes won the title after defeating Treat Huey and Nathaniel Lammons 6–2, 6–2 in the final.

== Seeds ==
1. (United Kingdom) Luke Bambridge / (Japan) Ben McLachlan (quarterfinals)
2. (Venezuela) Luis David Martínez / (Mexico) Miguel Ángel Reyes-Varela (quarterfinals)
3. (Philippines) Treat Huey / (United States) Nathaniel Lammons (final)
4. (Germany) Andre Begemann / (Romania) Florin Mergea (first round)

== Draw ==
=== Key ===
- Q = Qualifier
- WC = Wild card
- LL = Lucky loser
- Alt = Alternate
- ITF = ITF entry
- PR = Protected ranking
- SR = Special ranking
- SE = Special exempt
- JE = Junior exempt
- JR = Junior Accelerator Programme entrant
- CO = College Accelerator Programme entrant
- NG = Next Gen Accelerator Program entrant
- w/o = Walkover
- r = Retired
- d = Defaulted

First round
1	(United Kingdom) L Bambridge (Japan) B McLachlan	7	6
PR	(Belgium) A De Greef (France) Q Halys	5	4
(United States) A Lawson (United States) H Reese	7^{7}	6
(Turkey) C İlkel (Russia) E Karlovskiy	6^{5}	4
3	(Philippines) T Huey (United States) N Lammons	6^{5}	6	[10]
(Brazil) F Meligeni Alves (Canada) P Polansky	7^{7}	3	[6]
WC	(Romania) C Crețu (Romania) FC Jianu	4	3
(France) E Couacaud (Brazil) F Romboli	6	6
(Sweden) A Göransson (France) A Rinderknech	2	7	[9]
WC	(Romania) VV Cornea (Romania) A Jecan	6	5	[11]
(United States) R Galloway (Mexico) H Hach Verdugo	6	7
4	(Germany) A Begemann (Romania) F Mergea	1	5
(Brazil) R Matos (Brazil) J Menezes	1	6	[10]
WC	(Romania) M Copil (Romania) ND Ionel	6	3	[7]
(Russia) T Gabashvili (Spain) A Menéndez Maceiras	4	6	[5]
2	(Venezuela) LD Martínez (Mexico) MÁ Reyes-Varela	6	3	[10]

Quarterfinals
1	(United Kingdom) L Bambridge (Japan) B McLachlan	6^{7}	2
(United States) A Lawson (United States) H Reese	7^{9}	6
3	(Philippines) T Huey (United States) N Lammons	7^{7}	7
(France) E Couacaud (Brazil) F Romboli	6^{0}	5
WC	(Romania) VV Cornea (Romania) A Jecan	6^{5}	4
(United States) R Galloway (Mexico) H Hach Verdugo	7^{7}	6
(Brazil) R Matos (Brazil) J Menezes	6	7^{8}
2	(Venezuela) LD Martínez (Mexico) MÁ Reyes-Varela	4	6^{6}

Semifinals
(United States) A Lawson (United States) H Reese	4	7	[13]
3	(Philippines) T Huey (United States) N Lammons	6	5	[15]
(United States) R Galloway (Mexico) H Hach Verdugo	4	3
(Brazil) R Matos (Brazil) J Menezes	6	6

Final
3	(Philippines) T Huey (United States) N Lammons	2	2
(Brazil) R Matos (Brazil) J Menezes	6	6
