= 2023 Iași Open – Women's singles =

Women's singles
- 2023 Iași Open

Final
- Champion: (Romania) Ana Bogdan
- Runner-up: (Romania) Irina-Camelia Begu
- Score: 6–2, 6–3

Events
Singles	men	women
Doubles	men	women
- Iași Open

The defending champion Ana Bogdan won her second consecutive women's singles title at the 2023 Iași Open, defeating Irina-Camelia Begu in the final, 6–2, 6–3.

== Seeds ==
1. (Romania) Irina-Camelia Begu (final)
2. (Romania) Ana Bogdan (champion)
3. (Hungary) Panna Udvardy (first round)
4. (Montenegro) Danka Kovinić (second round)
5. (Switzerland) Simona Waltert (quarterfinals)
6. (Switzerland) Jil Teichmann (quarterfinals)
7. (Brazil) Laura Pigossi (quarterfinals)
8. (Slovenia) Tamara Zidanšek (semifinals)

== Draw ==
Key

- Q = Qualifier
- WC = Wild card
- LL = Lucky loser
- Alt = Alternate
- ITF = ITF entry
- PR = Protected ranking
- SR = Special ranking
- SE = Special exempt
- JE = Junior exempt
- JR = Junior Accelerator Programme entrant
- CO = College Accelerator Programme entrant
- NG = Next Gen Accelerator Program entrant
- w/o = Walkover
- r = Retired
- d = Defaulted

=== Finals ===
Semifinals
1/WC	(Romania) Irina-Camelia Begu	5	6	6
8	(Slovenia) Tamara Zidanšek	7	4	3
(Cyprus) Raluca Șerban	3	6	3
2	(Romania) Ana Bogdan	6	4	6

Final
1/WC	(Romania) Irina-Camelia Begu	2	3
2	(Romania) Ana Bogdan	6	6

=== Top half ===
First round
1/WC	(Romania) I-C Begu	7^{7}	6
(France) C Paquet	6^{4}	1
(Slovenia) P Hercog	4	5
(Hungary) RL Jani	6	7
WC	(Romania) A Todoni	6	6
(Greece) D Papamichail	4	4
WC	(Romania) I Amariei	3	1
6	(Switzerland) J Teichmann	6	6
3	(Hungary) P Udvardy	5	6^{4}
Q	(Slovenia) V Erjavec	7	7^{7}
D Astakhova	4	7^{8}	6
(United States) E Kalieva	6	6^{6}	3
LL	(Romania) O Gavrilă	2	3
WC	(Romania) A Prisăcariu	6	6
Q	A Tikhonova	4	2
8	(Slovenia) T Zidanšek	6	6

Second round
1/WC	(Romania) I-C Begu	6	6
(Hungary) RL Jani	3	1
WC	(Romania) A Todoni	7	3	3
6	(Switzerland) J Teichmann	5	6	6
Q	(Slovenia) V Erjavec	2	5
D Astakhova	6	7
WC	(Romania) A Prisăcariu	2	4
8	(Slovenia) T Zidanšek	6	6

Quarterfinals
1/WC	(Romania) I-C Begu	1	6	6
6	(Switzerland) J Teichmann	6	4	0
D Astakhova	3	3^{r}
8	(Slovenia) T Zidanšek	6	3

Semifinals
1/WC	(Romania) I-C Begu	5	6	6
8	(Slovenia) T Zidanšek	7	4	3

=== Bottom half ===
First round
7	(Brazil) L Pigossi	5	6	6
(Romania) M Bulgaru	7	0	1
(France) E Jacquemot	1	7^{7}	6
(Romania) I Bara	6	6^{2}	3
(Cyprus) R Șerban	6	6
Q	E Yashina	1	2
(Argentina) J Riera	3	4
4	(Montenegro) D Kovinić	6	6
5	(Switzerland) S Waltert	6	6
(Canada) C Zhao	4	2
(Croatia) P Marčinko	7^{7}	3	6
Q	(Turkey) İ Öz	6^{4}	6	0
LL	(Switzerland) C Perrin	6	6
(Romania) E-G Ruse	4	1
(Czech Republic) B Palicová	6	5	1
2	(Romania) A Bogdan	2	7	6

Second round
7	(Brazil) L Pigossi	4	7^{7}	7
(France) E Jacquemot	6	6^{3}	5
(Cyprus) R Șerban	6	6
4	(Montenegro) D Kovinić	0	1
5	(Switzerland) S Waltert	7^{7}	6
(Croatia) P Marčinko	6^{2}	3
LL	(Switzerland) C Perrin	4	6	1
2	(Romania) A Bogdan	6	3	6

Quarterfinals
7	(Brazil) L Pigossi	6^{8}	5
(Cyprus) R Șerban	7^{10}	7
5	(Switzerland) S Waltert	0	4
2	(Romania) A Bogdan	6	6

Semifinals
(Cyprus) R Șerban	3	6	3
2	(Romania) A Bogdan	6	4	6

== Qualifying ==
=== Seeds ===
1. (Turkey) İpek Öz (qualified)
2. (Slovenia) Dalila Jakupović (qualifying competition)
3. Anastasia Tikhonova (qualified)
4. (Slovenia) Veronika Erjavec (qualified)
5. Ekaterina Yashina (qualified)
6. (Switzerland) Conny Perrin (qualifying competition, lucky loser)
7. (Romania) Oana Gavrilă (qualifying competition, lucky loser)
8. (Serbia) Tamara Čurović (first round)

=== Qualifiers ===
1. (Turkey) İpek Öz
2. Ekaterina Yashina
3. Anastasia Tikhonova
4. (Slovenia) Veronika Erjavec

=== Lucky losers ===
1. (Switzerland) Conny Perrin
2. (Romania) Oana Gavrilă

=== Qualifying draw ===
==== First qualifier ====
First round
1	(Turkey) İpek Öz	7	6
(Romania) Anastasia Safta	5	1
WC	(Romania) Diana-Ioana Simionescu	0	2
6	(Switzerland) Conny Perrin	6	6

Qualifying competition
1	(Turkey) İpek Öz	2	7^{7}	6
6	(Switzerland) Conny Perrin	6	6^{4}	1

==== Second qualifier ====
First round
2	(Slovenia) Dalila Jakupović	6	6
(Australia) Olivia Tjandramulia	0	4
WC	(Romania) Anastasia Elena Bertea	0	1
5	Ekaterina Yashina	6	6

Qualifying competition
2	(Slovenia) Dalila Jakupović	4	7	4
5	Ekaterina Yashina	6	5	6

==== Third qualifier ====
First round
3	Anastasia Tikhonova	6	6
WC	(Romania) Anamaria Oana	3	4
(Romania) Georgia Crăciun	6	6
8	(Serbia) Tamara Čurović	1	1

Qualifying competition
3	Anastasia Tikhonova	6	6
(Romania) Georgia Crăciun	3	4

==== Fourth qualifier ====
First round
4	(Slovenia) Veronika Erjavec	6	6
WC	(Romania) Catrinel Onciulescu	1	1
(Romania) Elena-Teodora Cadar	4	1
7	(Romania) Oana Gavrilă	6	6

Qualifying competition
4	(Slovenia) Veronika Erjavec	6	6
7	(Romania) Oana Gavrilă	2	1
