= 2022 Iași Open – Men's doubles =

Men's doubles
- 2022 Iași Open

Final
- Champions: (France) Geoffrey Blancaneaux (Argentina) Renzo Olivo
- Runners-up: (Ecuador) Diego Hidalgo (Colombia) Cristian Rodríguez
- Score: 6–4, 2–6, [10–6]

Events
Singles	men	women
Doubles	men	women
- Iași Open

Orlando Luz and Felipe Meligeni Alves were the defending champions but only Meligeni Alves chose to defend his title, partnering Marcelo Demoliner. Meligeni Alves lost in the quarterfinals to Luciano Darderi and Fernando Romboli.

Geoffrey Blancaneaux and Renzo Olivo won the title after defeating Diego Hidalgo and Cristian Rodríguez 6–4, 2–6, [10–6] in the final.

== Seeds ==
1. (Austria) Alexander Erler / (Austria) Lucas Miedler (quarterfinals)
2. (Ecuador) Diego Hidalgo / (Colombia) Cristian Rodríguez (final)
3. (Italy) Luciano Darderi / (Brazil) Fernando Romboli (semifinals)
4. (Czech Republic) Zdeněk Kolář / (Ukraine) Denys Molchanov (withdrew)

== Draw ==
Key

- Q = Qualifier
- WC = Wild card
- LL = Lucky loser
- Alt = Alternate
- ITF = ITF entry
- PR = Protected ranking
- SR = Special ranking
- SE = Special exempt
- JE = Junior exempt
- JR = Junior Accelerator Programme entrant
- CO = College Accelerator Programme entrant
- NG = Next Gen Accelerator Program entrant
- w/o = Walkover
- r = Retired
- d = Defaulted

First round
1	(Austria) A Erler (Austria) L Miedler	6	6
WC	(Romania) Sebastian Gima (Romania) FC Jianu	3	2
(France) G Blancaneaux (Argentina) R Olivo	7^{7}	6
(Ukraine) O Krutykh (Czech Republic) D Poljak	6^{5}	1
Alt	(Romania) Ștefan Paloși (Romania) Dan Alexandru Tomescu	6	6
PR	(Belgium) J De Loore (Spain) N Sánchez Izquierdo	4	3
(Romania) M Copil (Romania) VV Cornea	w/o
(Brazil) D Dutra da Silva (Brazil) M Pucinelli de Almeida
(Spain) N Álvarez Varona (Brazil) T Seyboth Wild	0	3
(Brazil) M Demoliner (Brazil) F Meligeni Alves	6	6
Andrey Chepelev; A Shevchenko
3	(Italy) L Darderi (Brazil) F Romboli	w/o
(Kazakhstan) G Lomakin (Ukraine) O Prihodko	3	6	[7]
(India) A Kadhe (Greece) Pe Tsitsipas	6	3	[10]
WC	(Romania) ND Ionel (Romania) A Jecan	3	6	[8]
2	(Ecuador) D Hidalgo (Colombia) C Rodríguez	6	3	[10]

Quarterfinals
1	(Austria) A Erler (Austria) L Miedler	6^{6}	6^{2}
(France) G Blancaneaux (Argentina) R Olivo	7^{8}	7^{7}
Alt	(Romania) Ș Paloși (Romania) DA Tomescu	6^{5}	1
(Romania) M Copil (Romania) VV Cornea	7^{7}	6
(Brazil) M Demoliner (Brazil) F Meligeni Alves	6	3	[3]
3	(Italy) L Darderi (Brazil) F Romboli	3	6	[10]
(India) A Kadhe (Greece) Pe Tsitsipas	5	1
2	(Ecuador) D Hidalgo (Colombia) C Rodríguez	7	6

Semifinals
(France) G Blancaneaux (Argentina) R Olivo	6	7^{7}
(Romania) M Copil (Romania) VV Cornea	2	6^{3}
3	(Italy) L Darderi (Brazil) F Romboli	3	2
2	(Ecuador) D Hidalgo (Colombia) C Rodríguez	6	6

Final
(France) G Blancaneaux (Argentina) R Olivo	6	2	[10]
2	(Ecuador) D Hidalgo (Colombia) C Rodríguez	4	6	[6]
