= 2023 Iași Open – Men's singles =

Men's singles
- 2023 Iași Open

Final
- Champion: (France) Hugo Gaston
- Runner-up: (Spain) Bernabé Zapata Miralles
- Score: 3–6, 6–0, 6–4

Events
Singles	men	women
Doubles	men	women
← 2022 ·	Iași Open	· 2024 →

Felipe Meligeni Alves was the defending champion but chose not to defend his title.

Hugo Gaston won the title after defeating Bernabé Zapata Miralles 3–6, 6–0, 6–4 in the final.

== Seeds ==
1. (Spain) Bernabé Zapata Miralles (final)
2. (Moldova) Radu Albot (first round)
3. (Czech Republic) Tomáš Macháč (first round, retired)
4. (Hungary) Zsombor Piros (first round)
5. (Chile) Cristian Garín (semifinals)
6. (France) Hugo Gaston (champion)
7. (France) Enzo Couacaud (first round)
8. (Czech Republic) Zdeněk Kolář (second round)

== Draw ==
=== Key ===
- Q = Qualifier
- WC = Wild card
- LL = Lucky loser
- Alt = Alternate
- ITF = ITF entry
- PR = Protected ranking
- SR = Special ranking
- SE = Special exempt
- JE = Junior exempt
- JR = Junior Accelerator Programme entrant
- CO = College Accelerator Programme entrant
- NG = Next Gen Accelerator Program entrant
- w/o = Walkover
- r = Retired
- d = Defaulted

=== Finals ===
Semifinals
1/WC	(Spain) Bernabé Zapata Miralles	2	7	6
5	(Chile) Cristian Garín	6	5	3
6	(France) Hugo Gaston	6	6
Alt	(Canada) Steven Diez	4	4

Final
1/WC	(Spain) Bernabé Zapata Miralles	6	0	4
6	(France) Hugo Gaston	3	6	6

=== Top half ===
First round
1/WC	(Spain) B Zapata Miralles	6	6
(Tunisia) A Dougaz	4	3
(Czech Republic) D Svrčina	7^{7}	6
Q	(Romania) Sebastian Gima	6^{3}	2
(Czech Republic) J Menšík	7	6
Q	(France) K Jacquet	5	4
Q	Andrey Chepelev	4	6	5
8	(Czech Republic) Z Kolář	6	3	7
4	(Hungary) Z Piros	2	6	6^{2}
(France) T Atmane	6	3	7^{7}
(Italy) Edoardo Lavagno	4	3
(Italy) R Bonadio	6	6
Alt	(Monaco) V Vacherot	7^{7}	7
(Belgium) J De Loore	6^{4}	5
(Sweden) DN Mădăraș	5	2
5	(Chile) C Garín	7	6

Second round
1/WC	(Spain) B Zapata Miralles	6	6
(Czech Republic) D Svrčina	3	4
(Czech Republic) J Menšík	6	6
8	(Czech Republic) Z Kolář	2	2
(France) T Atmane	1	5
(Italy) R Bonadio	6	7
Alt	(Monaco) V Vacherot	6^{2}	2
5	(Chile) C Garín	7^{7}	6

Quarterfinals
1/WC	(Spain) B Zapata Miralles	6	3	6
(Czech Republic) J Menšík	1	6	2
(Italy) R Bonadio	4	6	6^{3}
5	(Chile) C Garín	6	4	7^{7}

Semifinals
1/WC	(Spain) B Zapata Miralles	2	7	6
5	(Chile) C Garín	6	5	3

=== Bottom half ===
First round
6	(France) H Gaston	4	0
Alt	(Serbia) M Zekić	6	1^{r}
PR	(Uruguay) P Cuevas	6	6
(Belgium) G Onclin	2	3
LL	(Czech Republic) M Vrbenský	6	6
Q	(Argentina) Juan Bautista Otegui	2	3
(Ukraine) V Sachko	6^{5}	6	3
3	(Czech Republic) T Macháč	7^{7}	4	0^{r}
7	(France) E Couacaud	2	1
WC	(Romania) FC Jianu	6	6
Q	(North Macedonia) K Ivanovski	4	7^{7}	6
(Romania) ND Ionel	6	6^{4}	2
Q	(Spain) Àlex Martí Pujolràs	1	1
Alt	(Canada) S Diez	6	6
(Argentina) JP Ficovich	6	6
2	(Moldova) R Albot	3	3

Second round
6	(France) H Gaston	7^{7}	6
PR	(Uruguay) P Cuevas	6^{5}	1
LL	(Czech Republic) M Vrbenský	1	2
(Ukraine) V Sachko	6	6
WC	(Romania) FC Jianu	6	4	3
Q	(North Macedonia) K Ivanovski	3	6	6
Alt	(Canada) S Diez	6	6
(Argentina) JP Ficovich	3	4

Quarterfinals
6	(France) H Gaston	6	3	6
(Ukraine) V Sachko	0	6	3
Q	(North Macedonia) K Ivanovski	4	3
Alt	(Canada) S Diez	6	6

Semifinals
6	(France) H Gaston	6	6
Alt	(Canada) S Diez	4	4
