= 2022 Iași Open – Women's doubles =

Women's doubles
- 2022 Iași Open

Final
- Champions: Darya Astakhova (Romania) Andreea Roșca
- Runners-up: (Hungary) Réka Luca Jani (Hungary) Panna Udvardy
- Score: 7–5, 5–7, [10–7]

Events
Singles	men	women
Doubles	men	women
Iași Open	· 2023 →

This was the first edition of the tournament.

Darya Astakhova and Andreea Roșca won the title, defeating Réka Luca Jani and Panna Udvardy in the final, 7–5, 5–7, [10–7].

== Seeds ==
1. (Czech Republic) Anastasia Dețiuc / (France) Elixane Lechemia (quarterfinals)
2. Angelina Gabueva / Anastasia Zakharova (semifinals)
3. (Indonesia) Beatrice Gumulya / (Australia) Olivia Tjandramulia (quarterfinals)
4. (Hungary) Réka Luca Jani / (Hungary) Panna Udvardy (final)

== Draw ==
=== Key ===
- Q = Qualifier
- WC = Wild card
- LL = Lucky loser
- Alt = Alternate
- ITF = ITF entry
- PR = Protected ranking
- SR = Special ranking
- SE = Special exempt
- JE = Junior exempt
- JR = Junior Accelerator Programme entrant
- CO = College Accelerator Programme entrant
- NG = Next Gen Accelerator Program entrant
- w/o = Walkover
- r = Retired
- d = Defaulted

=== Draw ===
First round
1	(Czech Republic) A Dețiuc (France) E Lechemia	6	6
(Romania) B Szabó (Romania) L Tănăsie	3	2
(Spain) A Lázaro García (Greece) D Papamichail	w/o
(Romania) I Bara (Romania) M Buzărnescu
3	(Indonesia) B Gumulya (Australia) O Tjandramulia	6	7
(Argentina) P Ormaechea (India) P Thombare	1	5
(Romania) I Amariei (Romania) C Dinu	0	6^{2}
D Astakhova (Romania) A Roșca	6	7^{7}
(Romania) G Lee (Romania) OG Simion
(Romania) M Bulgaru (Romania) IG Ghioroaie	w/o
WC	(Romania) D Munteanu (Romania) C Onciulescu	0	1
4	(Hungary) RL Jani (Hungary) P Udvardy	6	6
PR	(Chinese Taipei) Y-c Hsieh (China) Jin Lu	2	5
(Romania) A Prisăcariu (Bosnia and Herzegovina) A Wagner	6	7
(Romania) C Hristea (Romania) S Lazăr	0	3
2	A Gabueva; A Zakharova	6	6

Quarterfinals
1	(Czech Republic) A Dețiuc (France) E Lechemia	6	3	[6]
(Spain) A Lázaro García (Greece) D Papamichail	1	6	[10]
3	(Indonesia) B Gumulya (Australia) O Tjandramulia	2	5
D Astakhova (Romania) A Roșca	6	7
(Romania) M Bulgaru (Romania) IG Ghioroaie	2	3
4	(Hungary) RL Jani (Hungary) P Udvardy	6	6
(Romania) A Prisăcariu (Bosnia and Herzegovina) A Wagner	6	4	[9]
2	A Gabueva; A Zakharova	3	6	[11]

Semifinals
(Spain) A Lázaro García (Greece) D Papamichail	4	0
D Astakhova (Romania) A Roșca	6	6
4	(Hungary) RL Jani (Hungary) P Udvardy	6	6
2	A Gabueva; A Zakharova	1	3

Final
D Astakhova (Romania) A Roșca	7	5	[10]
4	(Hungary) RL Jani (Hungary) P Udvardy	5	7	[7]
