= 2023 Iași Open – Men's doubles =

Men's doubles
- 2023 Iași Open

Final
- Champions: (Colombia) Nicolás Barrientos (Pakistan) Aisam-ul-Haq Qureshi
- Runners-up: (Romania) Gabi Adrian Boitan (Romania) Bogdan Pavel
- Score: 6–3, 6–3

Events
Singles	men	women
Doubles	men	women
- Iași Open

Geoffrey Blancaneaux and Renzo Olivo were the defending champions but chose not to defend their title.

Nicolás Barrientos and Aisam-ul-Haq Qureshi won the title after defeating Gabi Adrian Boitan and Bogdan Pavel 6–3, 6–3 in the final.

== Seeds ==
1. (India) Sriram Balaji / (India) Jeevan Nedunchezhiyan (first round)
2. (Colombia) Nicolás Barrientos / (Pakistan) Aisam-ul-Haq Qureshi (champions)
3. (France) Théo Arribagé / (France) Luca Sanchez (first round)
4. (Switzerland) Luca Margaroli / (Greece) Michail Pervolarakis (first round)

== Draw ==
Key

- Q = Qualifier
- WC = Wild card
- LL = Lucky loser
- Alt = Alternate
- ITF = ITF entry
- PR = Protected ranking
- SR = Special ranking
- SE = Special exempt
- JE = Junior exempt
- JR = Junior Accelerator Programme entrant
- CO = College Accelerator Programme entrant
- NG = Next Gen Accelerator Program entrant
- w/o = Walkover
- r = Retired
- d = Defaulted

First round
1	(India) S Balaji (India) J Nedunchezhiyan	2	4
(Argentina) JP Paz (Romania) Dan Alexandru Tomescu	6	6
WC	(Romania) GA Boitan (Romania) B Pavel	6	6
(Romania) C Crețu (Romania) A Jecan	4	3
4	(Switzerland) L Margaroli (Greece) M Pervolarakis	6	6^{0}	[7]
(Israel) R Stepanov (United States) Tennyson Whiting	4	7^{7}	[10]
(Sweden) DN Mădăraș (Australia) B Walkin	6	4	[10]
Alt	(Argentina) T Lipovšek Puches (Argentina) Matías Zukas	3	6	[3]
Andrey Chepelev; D Golubev	5	1
WC	(Uruguay) P Cuevas (Romania) Matei Cristian Onofrei	7	6
(Romania) M Copil (Czech Republic) Z Kolář	6	7^{7}
3	(France) T Arribagé (France) L Sanchez	4	6^{4}
(Italy) R Bonadio (Italy) Edoardo Lavagno	6	6
(Argentina) JP Ficovich (Argentina) Juan Bautista Otegui	4	4
(France) K Jacquet (Romania) FC Jianu	4	1
2	(Colombia) N Barrientos (Pakistan) A-u-H Qureshi	6	6

Quarterfinals
(Argentina) JP Paz (Romania) DA Tomescu	2	7^{7}	[7]
WC	(Romania) GA Boitan (Romania) B Pavel	6	6^{2}	[10]
(Israel) R Stepanov (United States) T Whiting	3	4
(Sweden) DN Mădăraș (Australia) B Walkin	6	6
WC	(Uruguay) P Cuevas (Romania) MC Onofrei	3	2
(Romania) M Copil (Czech Republic) Z Kolář	6	6
(Italy) R Bonadio (Italy) E Lavagno	3	4
2	(Colombia) N Barrientos (Pakistan) A-u-H Qureshi	6	6

Semifinals
WC	(Romania) GA Boitan (Romania) B Pavel	w/o
(Sweden) DN Mădăraș (Australia) B Walkin
(Romania) M Copil (Czech Republic) Z Kolář	6^{5}	5
2	(Colombia) N Barrientos (Pakistan) A-u-H Qureshi	7^{7}	7

Final
WC	(Romania) GA Boitan (Romania) B Pavel	3	3
2	(Colombia) N Barrientos (Pakistan) A-u-H Qureshi	6	6
