= 2021 Iași Open – Doubles =

Doubles
- 2021 Iași Open

Final
- Champions: (Brazil) Orlando Luz (Brazil) Felipe Meligeni Alves
- Runners-up: (Argentina) Hernán Casanova (Spain) Roberto Ortega Olmedo
- Score: 6–3, 6–4

Events
Singles	Doubles
- Iași Open

Rafael Matos and João Menezes were the defending champions but chose not to defend their title.

Orlando Luz and Felipe Meligeni Alves won the title after defeating Hernán Casanova and Roberto Ortega Olmedo 6–3, 6–4 in the final.

== Seeds ==
1. (Brazil) Orlando Luz / (Brazil) Felipe Meligeni Alves (champions)
2. (France) Jonathan Eysseric / (Czech Republic) Zdeněk Kolář (quarterfinals)
3. (France) Enzo Couacaud / (France) Hugo Gaston (quarterfinals, withdrew)
4. (Italy) Riccardo Bonadio / (Austria) Lucas Miedler (semifinals)

== Draw ==
Key

- Q = Qualifier
- WC = Wild card
- LL = Lucky loser
- Alt = Alternate
- ITF = ITF entry
- PR = Protected ranking
- SR = Special ranking
- SE = Special exempt
- JE = Junior exempt
- JR = Junior Accelerator Programme entrant
- CO = College Accelerator Programme entrant
- NG = Next Gen Accelerator Program entrant
- w/o = Walkover
- r = Retired
- d = Defaulted

First round
1	(Brazil) O Luz (Brazil) F Meligeni Alves	6	7^{7}
(France) M Janvier (France) M Martineau	2	6^{4}
WC	(Romania) Mihai Alexandru Coman (Romania) Vlad Andrei Dancu	1	6^{4}
(Croatia) D Ajduković (Bosnia and Herzegovina) N Fatić	6	7^{7}
3	(France) E Couacaud (France) H Gaston	6	7
(Colombia) A González (France) A Müller	3	5
(Romania) ND Ionel (Romania) Ștefan Paloși	4	6^{5}
WC	(Romania) C Crețu (Romania) Dan Alexandru Tomescu	6	7^{7}
(Russia) B Bobrov (Russia) T Gabashvili	6	6
(Belarus) U Ignatik (Czech Republic) D Poljak	3	2
WC	(Romania) M Copil (Romania) A Jecan	5	6^{4}
4	(Italy) R Bonadio (Austria) L Miedler	7	7^{7}
(Argentina) H Casanova (Spain) R Ortega Olmedo	6	6
(Serbia) P Krstin (Serbia) M Zekić	0	4
(Romania) VV Cornea (Romania) FC Jianu	6	4	[6]
2	(France) J Eysseric (Czech Republic) Z Kolář	4	6	[10]

Quarterfinals
1	(Brazil) O Luz (Brazil) F Meligeni Alves	6	6
(Croatia) D Ajduković (Bosnia and Herzegovina) N Fatić	2	4
3	(France) E Couacaud (France) H Gaston
WC	(Romania) C Crețu (Romania) DA Tomescu	w/o
(Russia) B Bobrov (Russia) T Gabashvili	6^{4}	6	[7]
4	(Italy) R Bonadio (Austria) L Miedler	7^{7}	2	[10]
(Argentina) H Casanova (Spain) R Ortega Olmedo	6	3	[10]
2	(France) J Eysseric (Czech Republic) Z Kolář	3	6	[7]

Semifinals
1	(Brazil) O Luz (Brazil) F Meligeni Alves	6	7^{7}
WC	(Romania) C Crețu (Romania) DA Tomescu	2	6^{3}
4	(Italy) R Bonadio (Austria) L Miedler	7	6^{0}	[5]
(Argentina) H Casanova (Spain) R Ortega Olmedo	5	7^{7}	[10]

Final
1	(Brazil) O Luz (Brazil) F Meligeni Alves	6	6
(Argentina) H Casanova (Spain) R Ortega Olmedo	3	4
