= 2021 Iași Open =

- Date: 12–18 July
- Edition: 2nd
- Draw: 32S / 16D
- Surface: Clay
- Location: Iași, Romania

Champions

Singles
- (Czech Republic) Zdeněk Kolář

Doubles
- (Brazil) Orlando Luz / (Brazil) Felipe Meligeni Alves
- Iași Open

The 2021 Iași Open was a professional tennis tournament played on clay courts. It was the second edition of the tournament which was part of the 2021 ATP Challenger Tour. It took place in Iași, Romania between 12 and 18 July 2021.

== Singles main-draw entrants ==
=== Seeds ===
Country	Player	Rank^{1}	Seed
FRA	Hugo Gaston	162	1
FRA	Enzo Couacaud	164	2
FRA	Alexandre Müller	199	3
BRA	Felipe Meligeni Alves	221	4
CZE	Zdeněk Kolář	223	5
ROU	Marius Copil	224	6
FRA	Maxime Janvier	232	7
BUL	Dimitar Kuzmanov	246	8

- ^{1} Rankings as of 28 June 2021.

=== Other entrants ===
The following players received wildcards into the singles main draw:

- (Romania) Cezar Crețu
- (Romania) David Ionel
- (Romania) Ștefan Paloși

The following player received entry into the singles main draw using a protected ranking:

- (Italy) Matteo Donati

The following player received entry into the singles main draw as an alternate:

- (Argentina) Hernán Casanova

The following players received entry from the qualifying draw:

- (Bulgaria) Alexandar Lazarov
- (Czech Republic) David Poljak
- (Romania) Dan Alexandru Tomescu
- (Serbia) Miljan Zekić

The following player received entry as a lucky loser:

- (Russia) Bogdan Bobrov

== Champions ==
=== Singles ===
- (Czech Republic) Zdeněk Kolář def. (France) Hugo Gaston 7–5, 4–6, 6–4.

=== Doubles ===
- (Brazil) Orlando Luz / (Brazil) Felipe Meligeni Alves def. (Argentina) Hernán Casanova / (Spain) Roberto Ortega Olmedo 6–3, 6–4.
