= Andreea Roșca =

Romanian tennis player (born 1999)

- 2026
- Full name: Andreea Amalia Roșca
- Country (sports): Romania
- Born: 20 March 1999 (age 27) Romania
- Plays: Right (two-handed backhand)
- Prize money: $111,362

Singles
- Career record: 237–116
- Career titles: 12 ITF
- Highest ranking: No. 210 (12 November 2018)

Doubles
- Career record: 143–73
- Career titles: 1 WTA Challenger, 14 ITF
- Highest ranking: No. 179 (12 September 2022)

Andreea Amalia Roșca (born 20 March 1999) is a Romanian inactive tennis player.

She has won one doubles title on WTA 125 tournaments with twelve singles titles and 14 doubles titles on the ITF Women's Circuit.

== Career overview ==
Roșca made her WTA Tour main-draw debut at the 2018 Bucharest Open where she received a wildcard into the singles draw and lost her first-round match to Claire Liu.

She won her first WTA 125 title at the 2022 Iași Open, in the doubles draw, partnering with Darya Astakhova.

== WTA 125 finals ==
=== Doubles: 1 (title) ===
Result	W–L	Date	Tournament	Surface	Partner	Opponents	Score
Win	1–0	Aug 2022	Iași Open, Romania	Clay	(Russia) Darya Astakhova	(Hungary) Réka Luca Jani (Hungary) Panna Udvardy	7–5, 5–7, [10–7]

== ITF Circuit finals ==
Legend
$25,000 tournaments
$15,000 tournaments
$10,000 tournaments

=== Singles: 20 (12 titles, 7 runner-ups, 1 not played) ===
Result	W–L	Date	Tournament	Tier	Surface	Opponent	Score
Loss	0–1	Oct 2016	ITF Sozopol, Bulgaria	10,000	Hard	(Serbia) Dejana Radanović	0–4 ret.
Loss	0–2	Oct 2016	ITF Sozopol, Bulgaria	10,000	Hard	(Romania) Oana Gavrilă	3–6, 4–6
Win	1–2	Dec 2017	ITF Cairo, Egypt	15,000	Clay	(Austria) Melanie Klaffner	6–4, 6–4
Win	2–2	Dec 2017	ITF Cairo, Egypt	15,000	Clay	(Austria) Melanie Klaffner	6–1, 6–3
Win	3–2	Jan 2018	ITF Antalya, Turkey	15,000	Clay	(Czech Republic) Miriam Kolodziejová	7–6^{(6)}, 6–4
Win	4–2	Feb 2018	ITF Hammamet, Tunisia	15,000	Clay	(Serbia) Natalija Kostić	6–2, 6–4
Loss	4–3	Feb 2018	ITF Hammamet, Tunisia	15,000	Clay	(France) Margot Yerolymos	6–4, 2–6, 0–6
Win	5–3	Mar 2018	ITF Hammamet, Tunisia	15,000	Clay	(Italy) Anastasia Grymalska	6–2, 6–2
Win	6–3	Apr 2018	ITF Antalya, Turkey	15,000	Clay	(Russia) Varvara Flink	6–3, 6–4
Loss	6–4	Jun 2018	ITF Ystad, Sweden	25,000	Clay	(Slovenia) Kaja Juvan	6–2, 5–7, 1–6
Win	7–4	Jul 2018	ITF Turin, Italy	25,000	Clay	(Slovenia) Kaja Juvan	6–1, 6–1
Loss	7–5	Nov 2018	ITF Sant Cugat, Spain	25,000	Clay	(Spain) Olga Sáez Larra	1–6, 0–1 ret.
Win	8–5	Feb 2020	ITF Antalya, Turkey	15,000	Clay	(United States) Anastasia Nefedova	6–4, 7–5
Loss	8–6	Oct 2020	ITF Heraklion, Greece	15,000	Clay	(Romania) Alexandra Cadanțu	6–4, 3–6, 3–6
Win	9–6	Nov 2020	ITF Heraklion, Greece	15,000	Clay	(Italy) Martina Colmegna	6–0, 6–1
Win	10–6	Nov 2020	ITF Heraklion, Greece	15,000	Clay	(Czech Republic) Darja Viďmanová	6–1, 6-2
Loss	10–7	Dec 2020	ITF Antalya, Turkey	15,000	Clay	(Turkey) İpek Öz	1–6, 1–6
Finalist	NP	Dec 2020	ITF Antalya, Turkey	15,000	Clay	(Russia) Polina Kudermetova	cancelled
Win	11–7	Apr 2021	ITF Antalya, Turkey	15,000	Clay	(Czech Republic) Miriam Kolodziejová	7–5, 6–3
Win	12–7	Aug 2022	Brașov Open, Romania	25,000	Clay	(Russia) Julia Avdeeva	6–1, 6–7^{(5)}, 7–6^{(1)}

=== Doubles: 22 (14 titles, 8 runner-ups) ===
Result	W–L	Date	Tournament	Tier	Surface	Partner	Opponents	Score
Win	1–0	Jul 2016	ITF Târgu Jiu, Romania	10,000	Clay	(Romania) Gabriela Tătăruș	(United States) Quinn Gleason (United States) Melissa Kopinski	4–6, 6–4, [10–8]
Win	2–0	Aug 2016	ITF Bucharest, Romania	10,000	Clay	(Romania) Gabriela Tătăruș	(Romania) Elena Bogdan (Romania) Camelia Hristea	6–7^{(9)}, 6–2, [10–7]
Win	3–0	Oct 2016	ITF Sozopol, Bulgaria	10,000	Hard	(Romania) Oana Gavrilă	(Czech Republic) Kateřina Kramperová (Russia) Angelina Zhuravleva	6–4, 6–3
Win	4–0	Dec 2017	ITF Cairo, Egypt	15,000	Clay	(Romania) Gabriela Tătăruș	(Austria) Melanie Klaffner (Australia) Jelena Stojanovic	6–1, 6–3
Loss	4–1	Dec 2017	ITF Antalya, Turkey	15,000	Clay	(Romania) Gabriela Tătăruș	(Russia) Anastasia Kharitonova (Russia) Daria Nazarkina	5–7, 6–2, [8–10]
Win	5–1	Jan 2018	ITF Antalya, Turkey	15,000	Clay	(Romania) Oana Gavrilă	(Turkey) İpek Öz (Moldova) Ecaterina Visnevscaia	6–4, 6–2
Win	6–1	Feb 2018	ITF Hammamet, Tunisia	15,000	Clay	(United States) Anastasia Nefedova	(United States) Elizabeth Halbauer (France) Caroline Roméo	6–3, 6–1
Win	7–1	Mar 2018	ITF Antalya, Turkey	15,000	Clay	(Sweden) Fanny Östlund	(Romania) Ilona Georgiana Ghioroaie (France) Victoria Muntean	6–3, 4–6, [10–7]
Loss	7–2	Jun 2018	ITF Luzhou, China	25,000	Hard	(Australia) Alison Bai	(China) Han Xinyun (China) Lu Jingjing	3–6, 3–6
Loss	7–3	Nov 2018	ITF Sant Cugat, Spain	25,000	Clay	(Mexico) Renata Zarazúa	(Romania) Miriam Bulgaru (Romania) Nicoleta Dascălu	1–6, 6–4, [7–10]
Loss	7–4	Apr 2019	ITF Tunis, Tunisia	25,000	Clay	(Romania) Jaqueline Cristian	(Italy) Martina Colmegna (Italy) Anastasia Grymalska	4–6, 2–6
Win	8–4	Sep 2019	ITF Focșani, Romania	15,000	Clay	(Romania) Oana Gavrilă	(Romania) Andreea Mitu (Romania) Gabriela Tătăruș	1–6, 6–2, [10–4]
Loss	8–5	Sep 2019	ITF Arad, Romania	25,000	Clay	(Romania) Oana Gavrilă	(Romania) Andreea Mitu (Turkey) Başak Eraydın	0–6, 1–6
Win	9–5	Feb 2020	ITF Heraklion, Greece	15,000	Clay	(Romania) Oana Gavrilă	(Czech Republic) Miriam Kolodziejová (Slovakia) Chantal Škamlová	6–3, 4–6, [10–7]
Loss	9–6	Sep 2020	ITF Varna, Bulgaria	15,000	Clay	(Romania) Oana Gavrilă	(Romania) Cristina Dinu (Romania) Ioana Loredana Roșca	4–6, 6–3, [7–10]
Win	10–6	Oct 2020	ITF Heraklion, Greece	15,000	Clay	(Romania) Ioana Loredana Roșca	(Italy) Melania Delai (Italy) Dalila Spiteri	6–1, 6–3
Win	11–6	Nov 2020	ITF Heraklion, Greece	15,000	Clay	(Romania) Ioana Loredana Roșca	(Italy) Melania Delai (Italy) Martina Colmegna	6–4, 6–4
Win	12–6	Nov 2020	ITF Heraklion, Greece	15,000	Clay	(Romania) Ioana Loredana Roșca	(Russia) Elina Nepliy (Greece) Dimitra Pavlou	6–3, 6–3
Win	13–6	Dec 2020	ITF Antalya, Turkey	15,000	Clay	(Romania) Andreea Prisăcariu	(Ukraine) Viktoriia Dema (Romania) Cristina Dinu	3–6, 6–4, [10–6]
Win	14–6	Sep 2021	ITF Jablonec nad Nisou, Czech Republic	25,000	Clay	(Italy) Lisa Pigato	(Japan) Mana Kawamura (Japan) Funa Kozaki	3–6, 6–3, [10–7]
Loss	14–7	Feb 2022	ITF Antalya, Turkey	25,000	Clay	(Romania) Ioana Loredana Roșca	(Russia) Amina Anshba (Belgium) Marie Benoît	5–7, 6–7^{(4)}
Loss	14–8	Aug 2022	Brașov Open, Romania	25,000	Clay	(Romania) Cristina Dinu	(Romania) Ilona Georgiana Ghioroaie (Romania) Oana Georgeta Simion	5–7, 3–6
