= 2021 Iași Open – Singles =

Singles
- 2021 Iași Open

Final
- Champion: (Czech Republic) Zdeněk Kolář
- Runner-up: (France) Hugo Gaston
- Score: 7–5, 4–6, 6–4

Events
Singles	Doubles
- Iași Open

Carlos Taberner was the defending champion but chose not to defend his title.

Zdeněk Kolář won the title after defeating Hugo Gaston 7–5, 4–6, 6–4 in the final.

== Seeds ==
1. (France) Hugo Gaston (final)
2. (France) Enzo Couacaud (first round)
3. (France) Alexandre Müller (first round)
4. (Brazil) Felipe Meligeni Alves (semifinals)
5. (Czech Republic) Zdeněk Kolář (champion)
6. (Romania) Marius Copil (second round)
7. (France) Maxime Janvier (first round)
8. (Bulgaria) Dimitar Kuzmanov (quarterfinals)

== Draw ==
Key

- Q = Qualifier
- WC = Wild card
- LL = Lucky loser
- Alt = Alternate
- ITF = ITF entry
- PR = Protected ranking
- SR = Special ranking
- SE = Special exempt
- JE = Junior exempt
- JR = Junior Accelerator Programme entrant
- CO = College Accelerator Programme entrant
- NG = Next Gen Accelerator Program entrant
- w/o = Walkover
- r = Retired
- d = Defaulted

=== Finals ===
Semifinals
1	(France) Hugo Gaston	7	7^{7}
4	(Brazil) Felipe Meligeni Alves	5	6^{4}
Q	(Serbia) Miljan Zekić	5	6	2
5	(Czech Republic) Zdeněk Kolář	7	2	6

Final
1	(France) Hugo Gaston	5	6	4
5	(Czech Republic) Zdeněk Kolář	7	4	6

=== Top half ===
First round
1	(France) H Gaston	6	3	6
(Bosnia and Herzegovina) N Fatić	1	6	1
(Croatia) M Pecotić	4	6	6
(Spain) R Ortega Olmedo	6	0	1
(Croatia) D Ajduković	6	6
WC	(Romania) C Crețu	3	2
Q	(Bulgaria) A Lazarov	6	3	2
6	(Romania) M Copil	3	6	6
4	(Brazil) F Meligeni Alves	7	6
(Netherlands) I Sijsling	5	2
WC	(Romania) Ștefan Paloși	4	4
PR	(Italy) M Donati	6	6
(Spain) N Sánchez Izquierdo	3	6	2
WC	(Romania) ND Ionel	6	4	6
(Serbia) P Krstin	2	2
8	(Bulgaria) D Kuzmanov	6	6

Second round
1	(France) H Gaston	4	6	7^{7}
(Croatia) M Pecotić	6	4	6^{5}
(Croatia) D Ajduković	6	6
6	(Romania) M Copil	4	4
4	(Brazil) F Meligeni Alves	6	6
PR	(Italy) M Donati	3	3
WC	(Romania) ND Ionel	6	3	4
8	(Bulgaria) D Kuzmanov	2	6	6

Quarterfinals
1	(France) H Gaston	7^{7}	6
(Croatia) D Ajduković	6^{4}	2
4	(Brazil) F Meligeni Alves	6	3	6
8	(Bulgaria) D Kuzmanov	0	6	3

Semifinals
1	(France) H Gaston	7	7^{7}
4	(Brazil) F Meligeni Alves	5	6^{4}

=== Bottom half ===
First round
7	(France) M Janvier	3	6^{4}
Q	(Serbia) M Zekić	6	7^{7}
Alt	(Argentina) H Casanova	6	6
(Croatia) N Serdarušić	4	4
(Russia) T Gabashvili	5	6	5
(Austria) L Miedler	7	4	7
(Bulgaria) A Andreev	6	1	6
3	(France) A Müller	4	6	3
5	(Czech Republic) Z Kolář	6	7
Q	(Czech Republic) D Poljak	2	5
(Tunisia) A Dougaz	6	7^{7}
LL	(Russia) B Bobrov	4	6^{4}
Q	(Romania) Dan Alexandru Tomescu	4	3
(Romania) FC Jianu	6	6
(Italy) R Bonadio	7^{7}	6
2	(France) E Couacaud	6^{5}	3

Second round
Q	(Serbia) M Zekić	6	7^{7}
Alt	(Argentina) H Casanova	3	6^{3}
(Austria) L Miedler	7^{7}	6
(Bulgaria) A Andreev	6^{5}	1
5	(Czech Republic) Z Kolář	6	6
(Tunisia) A Dougaz	2	3
(Romania) FC Jianu	6^{5}	2
(Italy) R Bonadio	7^{7}	6

Quarterfinals
Q	(Serbia) M Zekić	7	6
(Austria) L Miedler	5	2
5	(Czech Republic) Z Kolář	6	6
(Italy) R Bonadio	4	4

Semifinals
Q	(Serbia) M Zekić	5	6	2
5	(Czech Republic) Z Kolář	7	2	6
