= Darya Astakhova =

Russian tennis player (born 2002)

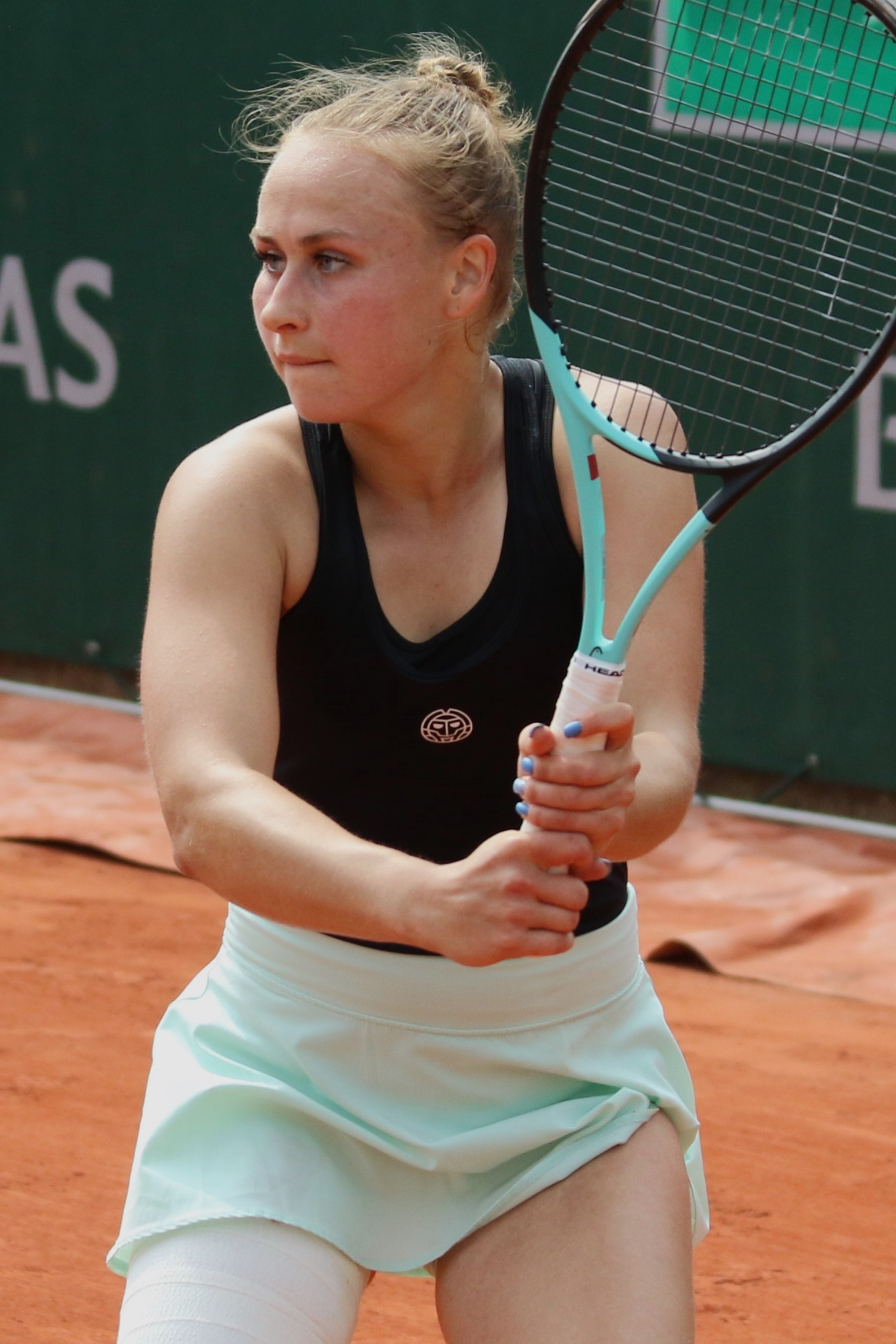
- Astakhova at the 2023 French Open
- Country (sports): Russia
- Born: 26 January 2002 (age 24)
- Plays: Right-handed
- Prize money: $372,908

Singles
- Career record: 265–137
- Career titles: 0 WTA, 8 ITF
- Highest ranking: No. 174 (12 October 2026)
- Current ranking: No. 174 (12 October 2026)

Grand Slam singles results
- Australian Open: Q2 (2025)
- French Open: Q1 (2023, 2025)
- Wimbledon: Q1 (2023)
- US Open: Q1 (2026)

Doubles
- Career record: 102–66
- Career titles: 1 WTA Challenger, 8 ITF
- Highest ranking: No. 137 (16 January 2023)
- Current ranking: No. 787 (12 October 2026)
- Last updated on: 12 October 2026.

Darya Igorevna Astakhova (born 26 January 2002) is a Russian tennis player.

Astakhova has a career-high singles ranking by the WTA of 174, achieved on 12 October 2026, and a best WTA doubles ranking of No. 137, achieved on 16 January 2023.

She won her first WTA 125 title at the 2022 Iași Open, in the doubles draw, partnering with Andreea Roșca.

Astakhova made her WTA Tour main-draw debut for the 2026 Korea Open where she received entry into the singles tournament as a qualifier, where she lost in the 1/8 finals (in the second round) to compatriot Alina Korneeva with a score of 2-6, 6-3, 1-6.

== Grand Slam performance timeline ==
Key
W	F	SF	QF	#R	RR	Q#	DNQ	A	NH

(W) winner; (F) finalist; (SF) semifinalist; (QF) quarterfinalist; (#R) rounds 4, 3, 2, 1; (RR) round-robin stage; (Q#) qualification round; (DNQ) did not qualify; (A) absent; (NH) not held; (SR) strike rate (events won / competed); (W–L) win–loss record.
To avoid confusion and double counting, these charts are updated at the conclusion of a tournament or when the player's participation has ended.

== WTA 125 finals ==
=== Doubles: 1 (title) ===
Result	W–L	Date	Tournament	Surface	Partner	Opponents	Score
Win	1–0	Aug 2022	Iași Open, Romania	Clay	(Romania) Andreea Roșca	(Hungary) Réka Luca Jani (Hungary) Panna Udvardy	7–5, 5–7, [10–7]

== ITF Circuit finals ==
=== Singles: 22 (8 titles, 14 runner-ups) ===
Legend
W60/75 tournaments (0–2)
$40,000 tournaments (2–1)
$25,000 tournaments (2–5)
$15,000 tournaments (4–6)

Result	W–L	Date	Tournament	Tier	Surface	Opponent	Score
Loss	0–1	Nov 2018	ITF Heraklion, Greece	15,000	Clay	(Russia) Anna Ureke	2–6, 6–1, 2–6
Loss	0–2	May 2019	ITF Heraklion, Greece	15,000	Clay	(Hungary) Vanda Lukács	5–7, 2–6
Loss	0–3	Jul 2019	ITF Prokuplje, Serbia	15,000	Clay	(Australia) Seone Mendez	4–6, 1–6
Loss	0–4	Nov 2019	ITF Heraklion, Greece	15,000	Clay	(Latvia) Daniela Vismane	6–0, 6–7^{(5–7)}, 1–6
Win	1–4	Nov 2019	ITF Heraklion, Greece	15,000	Clay	(Romania) Arina Vasilescu	4–6, 6–4, 6–3
Win	2–4	Dec 2019	ITF Heraklion, Greece	15,000	Clay	(Bolivia) Noelia Zeballos	6–2, 6–0
Win	3–4	Mar 2020	ITF Heraklion, Greece	15,000	Clay	(Romania) Arina Vasilescu	1–6, 6–4, 6–2
Loss	3–5	Oct 2020	ITF Monastir, Tunisia	15,000	Hard	(Belarus) Shalimar Talbi	2–6, 3–6
Win	4–5	Jun 2021	ITF Heraklion, Greece	15,000	Clay	(Czech Republic) Michaela Bayerlová	6–3, 6–2
Win	5–5	Jun 2021	ITF Jonkoping, Sweden	25,000	Clay	(Italy) Lucia Bronzetti	3–6, 6–3, 7–5
Loss	5–6	Aug 2021	ITF Bydgoszcz, Poland	25,000	Clay	(Germany) Nastasja Schunk	6–4, 2–6, 0–6
Loss	5–7	Jun 2022	ITF Tbilisi, Georgia	25,000	Hard	(Russia) Anastasia Zakharova	2–6, 6–3, 2–6
Loss	5–8	Oct 2022	ITF Sozopol, Bulgaria	25,000	Hard	(Turkey) Zeynep Sönmez	5–7, 4–6
Loss	5–9	Mar 2023	ITF Astana, Kazakhstan	W40	Hard (i)	(Russia) Polina Kudermetova	2–6, 3–6
Loss	5–10	Aug 2023	ITF Leipzig, Germany	W25+H	Clay	(Czech Republic) Brenda Fruhvirtová	3–6, 3–6
Win	6–10	Aug 2023	ITF Wroclaw, Poland	W40	Clay	(Bulgaria) Gergana Topalova	6–1, 7–5
Loss	6–11	Nov 2023	Brisbane QTC International, Australia	W60	Hard	(Australia) Taylah Preston	3–6, 4–6
Loss	6–12	May 2025	ITF Kuršumlijska Banja, Serbia	W15	Clay	(Switzerland) Alina Granwehr	4–6, 7–5, 2–6
Win	7–12	Jan 2026	ITF Antalya, Turkiye	W35	Clay	(Spain) Ángela Fita Boluda	6–1, 4–6, 6–4
Loss	7–13	Mar 2026	ITF Heraklion, Greece	W35	Clay	(Spain) Ane Mintegi del Olmo	1–6 ret.
Win	8–13	Apr 2026	ITF Bujumbura, Burundi	W50	Clay	(France) Margaux Rouvroy	6–4, 6–4
Loss	8–14	Aug 2026	ITF Tianjin, China	W75	Hard	(Chinese Taipei) Joanna Garland	3–6, 2–6

=== Doubles: 18 (8 titles, 10 runner-ups) ===
Legend
$60,000 tournaments (1–1)
$40,000 tournaments (0–1)
$25,000 tournaments (4–2)
$15,000 tournaments (3–6)

Result	W–L	Date	Tournament	Tier	Surface	Partner	Opponents	Score
Loss	0–1	May 2019	ITF Heraklion, Greece	15,000	Clay	(Ukraine) Oleksandra Oliynykova	(Greece) Anna Arkadianou (Russia) Elina Nepliy	2–6, 4–6
Win	1–1	Jul 2019	ITF Prokuplje, Serbia	15,000	Clay	(Slovakia) Laura Svatiková	(Bosnia and Herzegovina) Nefisa Berberović (Slovenia) Veronika Erjavec	6–3, 0–6, [10–6]
Loss	1–2	Dec 2019	ITF Heraklion, Greece	15,000	Clay	(Israel) Lina Glushko	(Romania) Ilinca Amariei (Romania) Alessia Ciuca	3–6, 3–6
Loss	1–3	Oct 2020	ITF Monastir, Tunisia	15,000	Hard	(Russia) Anastasia Sukhotina	(Czech Republic) Laetitia Pulchartová (Latvia) Darja Semenistaja	2–6, 7–6^{(8)}, [5–10]
Win	2–3	Oct 2020	ITF Monastir, Tunisia	15,000	Hard	(Latvia) Darja Semenistaja	(Argentina) María Lourdes Carlé (Denmark) Olivia Gram	6–4, 6–3
Win	3–3	Jan 2021	ITF Monastir, Tunisia	15,000	Hard	(Algeria) Inès Ibbou	(France) Manon Arcangioli (France) Salma Djoubri	6–3, 6–0
Loss	3–4	Mar 2021	ITF Antalya, Turkey	15,000	Clay	(Slovenia) Nika Radišić	(Czech Republic) Miriam Kolodziejová (Czech Republic) Aneta Laboutková	3–6, 6–4, [6–10]
Loss	3–5	May 2021	ITF Sibenik, Croatia	15,000	Clay	(Russia) Ekaterina Makarova	(Croatia) Petra Marčinko (Hungary) Natália Szabanin	4–6, 3–6
Loss	3–6	May 2021	ITF Heraklion, Greece	15,000	Clay	(Romania) Elena-Teodora Cadar	(Czech Republic) Anastasia Dețiuc (Netherlands) Lexie Stevens	1–6, 6–4, [6–10]
Win	4–6	Apr 2022	ITF Pula, Italy	W25	Clay	(Russia) Ekaterina Reyngold	(Italy) Anna Turati (Italy) Bianca Turati	7–6^{(6)}, 6–4
Loss	4–7	May 2022	Roma Cup, Italy	W60	Clay	(Latvia) Daniela Vismane	(Italy) Matilde Paoletti (Italy) Lisa Pigato	1–6, 6–7^{(7)}
Loss	4–8	Jun 2022	ITF Tbilisi, Georgia	W25	Hard	(Russia) Anna Kubareva	(Russia) Angelina Gabueva (Russia) Anastasia Zakharova	1–6, 2–6
Win	5–8	Sep 2022	Vrnjačka Banja Open, Serbia	W60	Clay	(Russia) Ekaterina Reyngold	(Romania) Cristina Dinu (Slovenia) Nika Radišić	3–6, 6–2, [10–8]
Win	6–8	Oct 2022	ITF Sozopol, Bulgaria	W25	Hard	(Russia) Irina Khromacheva	(Netherlands) Jasmijn Gimbrère (Estonia) Elena Malõgina	w/o
Loss	6–9	Feb 2023	ITF Mâcon, France	W40	Hard (i)	(India) Prarthana Thombare	(Switzerland) Xenia Knoll (Belgium) Magali Kempen	3–6, 4–6
Loss	6–10	Apr 2023	ITF Sharm El Sheik, Egypt	W25	Hard	(Russia) Ekaterina Reyngold	(United States) Emina Bektas (Hong Kong) Eudice Chong	2–6, 4–6
Win	7–10	Jul 2023	ITF Horb, Germany	W25	Clay	(Latvia) Daniela Vismane	(Germany) Laura Böhner (Argentina) Berta Bonardi	6–3, 6–2
Win	8–10	Jan 2026	ITF Antalya, Türkiye	W35	Clay	(Romania) Andreea Prisăcariu	(Croatia) Lucija Ćirić Bagarić (Hungary) Amarissa Tóth	6–2, 3–6, [10–8]
