= Panna Udvardy =

Hungarian tennis player (born 1998)

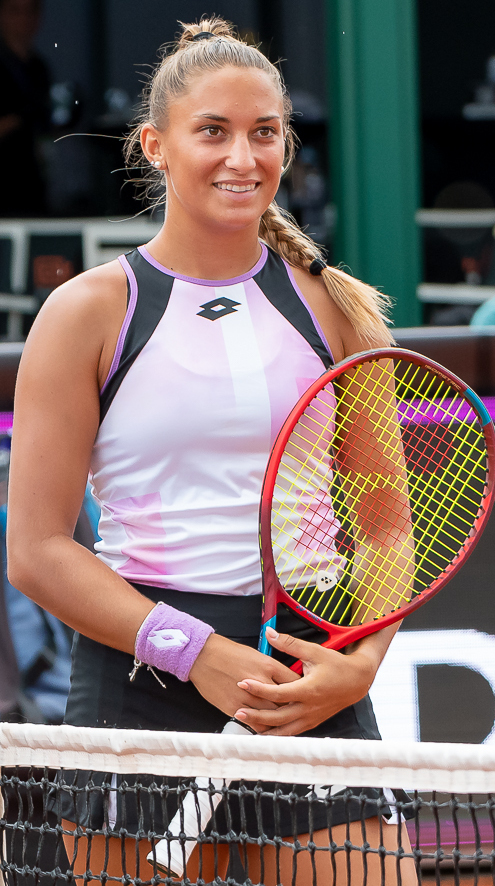
- Udvardy at the 2021 Winners Open
- Country (sports): Hungary
- Residence: Miami, Florida, US
- Born: 28 September 1998 (age 28) Kaposvár, Hungary
- Height: 1.70 m (5 ft 7 in)
- Plays: Right-handed (two-handed backhand)
- Coach: Martin Torretta, Bastien Fazincani
- Prize money: $2,337,366

Singles
- Career record: 353–261
- Career titles: 2 WTA 125
- Highest ranking: No. 59 (25 May 2026)
- Current ranking: No. 88 (16 November 2026)

Grand Slam singles results
- Australian Open: 1R (2022, 2023, 2026)
- French Open: 1R (2022, 2023, 2024, 2026)
- Wimbledon: 2R (2022)
- US Open: 1R (2023, 2026)

Doubles
- Career record: 122–122
- Career titles: 1
- Highest ranking: No. 65 (24 October 2022)
- Current ranking: No. 289 (16 November 2026)

Grand Slam doubles results
- Australian Open: 1R (2023)
- French Open: 2R (2023)
- Wimbledon: 1R (2022, 2026)
- US Open: 1R (2022, 2026)
- Last updated on: 20 November 2026.

Panna Udvardy (Hungarian pronunciation: [ˈpɒnnɒ ˈudvɒrdi]; born 28 September 1998) is a Hungarian professional tennis player. She has a career-high singles ranking of world No. 59, achieved on 25 May 2026, and a best in doubles of No. 65, achieved on 24 October 2022.

Udvardy has won one WTA Tour title in doubles, at the 2025 Iași Open, with Veronika Erjavec, and two WTA 125 tournaments in singles.

== Career ==
=== 2017: WTA Tour debut ===
Udvardy made her WTA Tour main-draw debut at the 2017 Hungarian Ladies Open in the doubles tournament, partnering with Anna Blinkova.

=== 2021–23: Major debut & WTA 125 titles, top 100 ===
She reached her first final on the WTA Challenger Tour at the 2021 Montevideo Open, losing to Diane Parry in straight sets. She made her top 100 debut at world No. 96, on 29 November 2021.

Udvardy reached her maiden WTA Tour doubles final at the WTA 500 2022 Sydney International, partnering Vivian Heisen, losing to Anna Danilina and Beatriz Haddad Maia.

She made her Grand Slam tournament debut at the 2022 Australian Open, losing to Victoria Azarenka in the first round.

Playing with Mayar Sherif, Udvardy won her first WTA 125 doubles title at the 2022 Karlsruhe Open, defeating Yana Sizikova and Alison Van Uytvanck in the final.

Making her debut at the Wimbledon Championships, she recorded her first major match win defeating Tamara Zidanšek, before losing to 24th seed Elise Mertens in the second round.

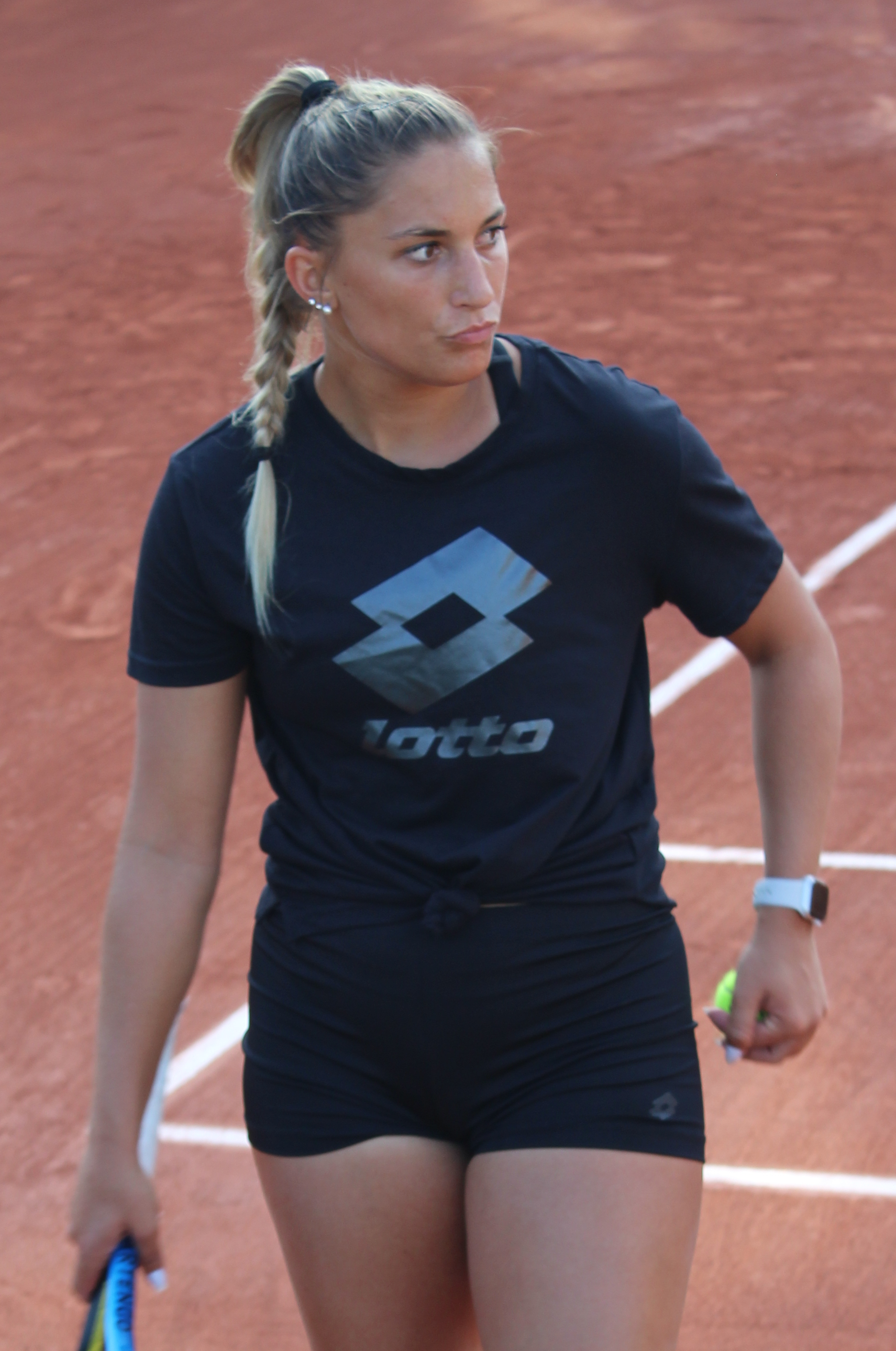
Udvardy at the 2023 French Open

Partnering with Amina Anshba, she was runner-up at the 2022 Palermo Ladies Open, her second WTA Tour doubles final. They were defeated by the defending champion, Kimberley Zimmermann, who played alongside Anna Bondár. She reached the singles final at the 2022 Iași Open but lost to Ana Bogdan.

Udvardy made it through to the doubles final at the Țiriac Foundation Trophy in September, playing with Réka Luca Jani, but again lost out on the title, this time to Aliona Bolsova and Andrea Gámiz.

In November 2022, Udvardy won her first WTA 125 title at the Argentina Open, defeating Danka Kovinić in straight sets in the final.

Udvardy reached her third career doubles final at the 2023 Hobart International, partnering with Viktorija Golubic and losing to Kirsten Flipkens and Laura Siegemund.

=== 2024–2025: First WTA Tour doubles titles ===
Partnering Irina Khromacheva, Udvardy won another WTA 125 doubles title at the 2024 Swedish Open, defeating Eri Hozumi and Jang Su-jeong in the final. She entered the main draw at the French Open as a lucky loser, but lost in the first round to Anastasia Pavlyuchenkova. Udvardy defeated wildcard entrant Giorgia Pedone, qualifier Anastasiya Soboleva, sixth seed Renata Zarazúa and ninth seed Tamara Zidanšek to reach next WTA 125 final at the 2024 Bari Open where she lost Anca Todoni. She qualified for the Wimbledon Championships but lost in the first round to 17th seed Anna Kalinskaya, in straight sets.

In November, Udvardy reached back-to-back WTA 125 singles semifinals at the 2024 Bolivia Open and Cali Open, losing to Emiliana Arango and Veronika Erjavec, respectively.

Partnering with Veronika Erjavec, she won her first WTA Tour doubles title at the 2025 Iași Open, defeating María Lourdes Carlé and Simona Waltert in the final. Udvardy lost to Alexandra Eala in the final of the Guadalajara 125 Open.

At the 2025 SP Open, Udvardy reached her first tour-level hardcourt quarterfinal by defeating Anna Rogers and wildcard entrant Ana Candiotto. She eventually lost in the last eight to eventual champion Tiantsoa Rakotomanga Rajaonah.

Udvardy was runner-up at the Cali Open, another WTA 125 tournament, losing to Sinja Kraus in the final. But she won her second WTA 125 singles title at the Argentina Open, overcoming Varvara Lepchenko in the championship match.

=== 2026: First WTA Tour singles final ===
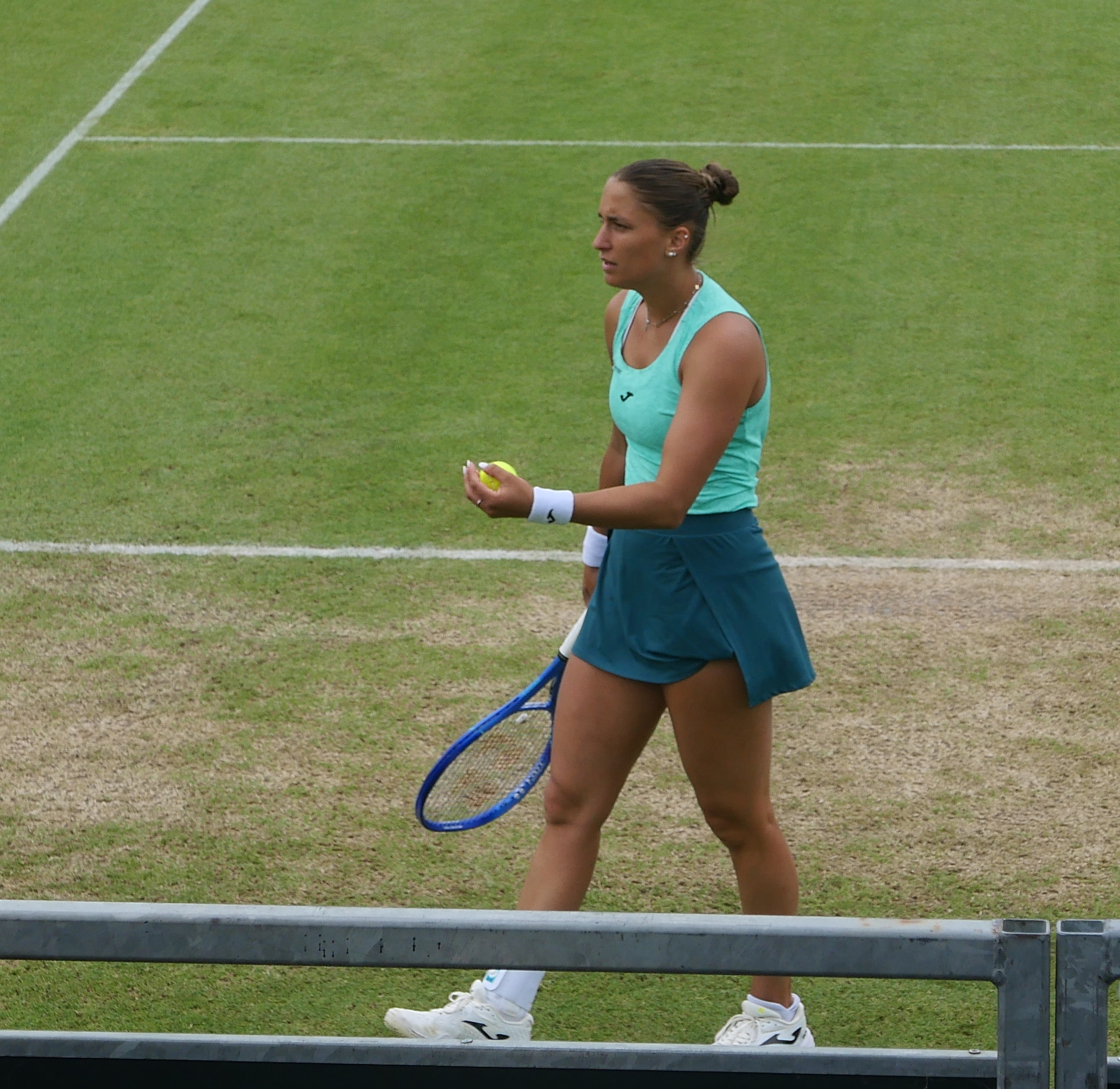
Udvardy at the 2026 Rosmalen Open

Seeded eighth at the Copa Colsanitas in Bogotá, Colombia, Udvardy defeated wildcard entrants María Torres Murcia and Julieta Pareja, both in three sets, before recording a straight sets win over Katarzyna Kawa to make it into the semifinals, where she overcame Emiliana Arango in a deciding set tiebreak to reach her first WTA Tour singles final. She lost in the championship match to top seed Marie Bouzková in three sets. Despite the defeat, Udvardy moved up to a new career-high ranking of world No. 71 on 6 April 2026.

At the Rabat Grand Prix in Morocco, she reached the second tour-level semifinal of her career, defeating Hanne Vandewinkel, wildcard entrant Sada Nahimana and Emiliana Arango. Udvardy lost to Anhelina Kalinina in the last four.

Seeded fifth at the Iași Open, she recorded wins over qualifier Leyre Romero Gormaz and Katarzyna Kawa, before losing to Paula Badosa in the quarterfinals.

== Performance timelines ==
Key
W	F	SF	QF	#R	RR	Q#	P#	DNQ	A	Z#	PO	G	S	B	NMS	NTI	P	NH

(W) winner; (F) finalist; (SF) semifinalist; (QF) quarterfinalist; (#R) rounds 4, 3, 2, 1; (RR) round-robin stage; (Q#) qualification round; (P#) preliminary round; (DNQ) did not qualify; (A) absent; (Z#) Davis/Fed Cup Zonal Group (with number indication) or (PO) play-off; (G) gold, (S) silver or (B) bronze Olympic/Paralympic medal; (NMS) not a Masters tournament; (NTI) not a Tier I tournament; (P) postponed; (NH) not held; (SR) strike rate (events won / competed); (W–L) win–loss record.
To avoid confusion and double counting, these charts are updated at the conclusion of a tournament or when the player's participation has ended.

Only main-draw results in WTA Tour, Grand Slam tournaments, Billie Jean King Cup, United Cup, Hopman Cup and Olympic Games are included in win–loss records.

=== Singles ===
Current through the 2026 US Open

Tournament	2018	...	2021	2022	2023	2024	2025	2026	SR	W–L	Win%
Grand Slam tournaments
Australian Open	A		A	1R	1R	Q1	Q2	1R	0 / 3	0–3	0%
French Open	A		A	1R	1R	1R	Q2	1R	0 / 4	0–4	0%
Wimbledon	A		Q2	2R	1R	1R	Q3	1R	0 / 4	1–4	20%
US Open	A		Q1	Q1	1R	A	Q3	1R	0 / 2	0–2	0%
Win–Loss	0–0		0–0	1–3	0–4	0–2	0–0	0–3	0 / 13	1–13	7%
National representation
Billie Jean King Cup (Note: Formerly known as Fed Cup until 2020.)	A		A	PO	A	A	A		0 / 0	3–1	75%
WTA 1000 tournaments
Qatar Open	A		NTI	A	NTI	A	A	A	0 / 0	0–0	–
Dubai Championships	NTI		A	NTI	A	A	A	A	0 / 0	0–0	–
Indian Wells Open	A		Q1	Q1	A	A	A	A	0 / 0	0–0	–
Miami Open	A		A	1R	A	A	A	A	0 / 1	0–1	0%
Madrid Open	A		A	Q1	A	A	1R	2R	0 / 2	1–2	33%
Italian Open	A		A	A	A	A	A	2R	0 / 1	1–1	50%
Canadian Open	A		A	A	A	A	A		0 / 0	0–0	–
Cincinnati Open	A		A	A	A	A	A		0 / 0	0–0	–
China Open	A		NH		A	A	A	1R	0 / 1	0–1	0%
Wuhan Open	A		NH			A	A		0 / 0	0–0	–
Win–Loss	0–0		0–0	0–1	0–0	0–0	0–1	2–3	0 / 5	2–5	29%
Career statistics
	2018	...	2021	2022	2023	2024	2025	2026	SR	W–L	Win%
Tournaments	1		2	13	8	2	3	7	Career total: 36		
Titles	0		0	0	0	0	0	0	Career total: 0		
Finals	0		0	0	0	0	0	1	Career total: 1		
Hard win–loss	0–1		0–0	0–5	2–4	0–0	2–1	1–3	0 / 14	5–14	26%
Clay win–loss	0–0		2–2	4–6	1–3	0–1	2–2	6–4	0 / 18	15–18	45%
Grass win–loss	0–0		0–0	1–2	0–1	0–1	0–0	0–0	0 / 4	1–4	25%
Overall win–loss	0–1		2–2	5–13	3–8	0–2	4–3	7–7	0 / 36	21–36	37%
Year-end ranking (Note: 2016: WTA ranking-1034, 2017: WTA ranking-360, ... 2019: WTA ranking-427, 2020: WTA ranking-352.)	443		115	83	140	159	108		$2,329,041		

=== Doubles ===
Current through the 2023 Hamburg Open.

Tournament	2017	2018	2019	2020	2021	2022	2023	SR	W–L	Win %
Grand Slam tournaments
Australian Open	A	A	A	A	A	A	1R	0 / 1	0–1	
French Open	A	A	A	A	A	1R	2R	0 / 2	1–2	
Wimbledon	A	A	A	NH	A	1R	A	0 / 1	0–1	
US Open	A	A	A	A	A	1R	A	0 / 1	0–1	
Win–Loss	0–0	0–0	0–0	0–0	0–0	0–3	1–2	0 / 5	1–5	
National representation
Billie Jean King Cup	A	A	A	A (Note: Edition is split into the two years due to COVID-19.)		PO	A	0 / 0	1–1	
Career statistics
	2017	2018	2019	2020	2021	2022	2023	SR	W–L	Win %
Tournaments	1	1	0	0	1	11	5	Career total: 19		
Titles	0	0	0	0	0	0	0	Career total: 0		
Finals	0	0	0	0	0	2	1	Career total: 3		
Overall win-loss	0–1	0–1	0–0	0–0	0–1	7–12	4–5	0 / 19	11–20	
Year-end ranking (Note: 2016: WTA ranking-1066.)	419	354	469	438	244	71	165			

== WTA Tour finals ==
=== Singles: 1 (runner-up) ===
Legend WTA 250 (0–1)	Finals by surface Clay (0–1)	Finals by setting Outdoor (0–1)

Result	Date	Tournament	Tier	Surface	Opponent	Score
Loss	Apr 2026	Copa Colsanitas, Colombia	WTA 250	Clay	(Czech Republic) Marie Bouzková	7–6^{(9–7)}, 2–6, 2–6

=== Doubles: 4 (1 title, 3 runner-ups) ===
Legend WTA 500 (0–1) WTA 250 (1–2)	Finals by surface Hard (0–2) Clay (1–1)	Finals by setting Outdoor (1–3)

Result	W–L	Date	Tournament	Tier	Surface	Partner	Opponents	Score
Loss	0–1	Jan 2022	Sydney International, Australia	WTA 500	Hard	(Germany) Vivian Heisen	(Kazakhstan) Anna Danilina (Brazil) Beatriz Haddad Maia	6–4, 5–7, [8–10]
Loss	0–2	Jul 2022	Palermo Ladies Open, Italy	WTA 250	Clay	Amina Anshba	(Hungary) Anna Bondár (Belgium) Kimberley Zimmermann	3–6, 2–6
Loss	0–3	Jan 2023	Hobart International, Australia	WTA 250	Hard	(Switzerland) Viktorija Golubic	(Belgium) Kirsten Flipkens (Germany) Laura Siegemund	4–6, 5–7
Win	1–3	Jul 2025	Iași Open, Romania	WTA 250	Clay	(Slovenia) Veronika Erjavec	(Argentina) María Lourdes Carlé (Switzerland) Simona Waltert	7–5, 6–3

== WTA 125 finals ==
=== Singles: 8 (2 titles, 6 runner-ups) ===
Result	W–L	Date	Tournament	Surface	Opponent	Score
Loss	0–1	Nov 2021	Montevideo Open, Uruguay	Clay	(France) Diane Parry	3–6, 2–6
Loss	0–2	Aug 2022	Iași Open, Romania	Clay	(Romania) Ana Bogdan	2–6, 6–3, 1–6
Win	1–2	Nov 2022	Buenos Aires Open, Argentina	Clay	(Montenegro) Danka Kovinić	6–4, 6–1
Loss	1–3	Jun 2023	Solgironès Open, Spain	Clay	(Netherlands) Arantxa Rus	6–7^{(2–7)}, 3–6
Loss	1–4	Jun 2024	Bari Open, Italy	Clay	(Romania) Anca Todoni	4–6, 0–6
Loss	1–5	Sep 2025	Guadalajara 125 Open, Mexico	Hard	(Philippines) Alexandra Eala	6–1, 5–7, 3–6
Loss	1–6	Nov 2025	Cali Open, Colombia	Clay	(Austria) Sinja Kraus	2–6, 0–6
Win	2–6	Nov 2025	Buenos Aires Open, Argentina (2)	Clay	(United States) Varvara Lepchenko	6–3, 7–5

=== Doubles: 4 (2 titles, 2 runner-ups) ===
Result	W–L	Date	Tournament	Surface	Partner	Opponents	Score
Win	1–0	May 2022	Karlsruhe Open, Germany	Clay	(Egypt) Mayar Sherif	Yana Sizikova (Belgium) Alison Van Uytvanck	5–7, 6–4, [10–2]
Loss	1–1	Aug 2022	Iași Open, Romania	Clay	(Hungary) Réka Luca Jani	Darya Astakhova (Romania) Andreea Roșca	5–7, 7–5, [7–10]
Loss	1–2	Sep 2022	Bucharest Trophy, Romania	Clay	(Hungary) Réka Luca Jani	(Spain) Aliona Bolsova (Venezuela) Andrea Gámiz	5–7, 3–6
Win	2–2	Jul 2023	Båstad Open, Sweden	Clay	Irina Khromacheva	(Japan) Eri Hozumi (South Korea) Jang Su-jeong	4–6, 6–3, [10–5]

== ITF Circuit finals ==
=== Singles: 22 (12 titles, 10 runner-ups) ===
Legend W100 tournaments (0–2) W80 tournaments (0–1) W60 tournaments (4–1) W50 tournaments (0–1) W25 tournaments (4–3) W10/15 tournaments (4–2)	Finals by surface Hard (1–4) Clay (11–6)

Result	W–L	Date	Tournament	Tier	Surface	Opponent	Score
Win	1–0	Dec 2016	ITF Casablanca, Morocco	10k	Clay	(Greece) Eleni Kordolaimi	6–4, 7–6^{(3)}
Loss	1–1	Dec 2016	ITF Rabat, Morocco	10k	Clay	(France) Joséphine Boualem	6–2, 6–7^{(1)}, 4–6
Loss	1–2	Feb 2017	ITF Edgbaston, United Kingdom	15k	Hard (i)	(France) Manon Arcangioli	6–7^{(4)}, 1–6
Win	2–2	Apr 2017	ITF Hammamet, Tunisia	15k	Clay	(France) Audrey Albié	1–6, 6–4, 6–3
Win	3–2	May 2017	ITF Oeiras, Portugal	15k	Clay	(Italy) Gaia Sanesi	6–7^{(5)}, 7–5, 6–4
Win	4–2	Sep 2017	ITF Székesfehérvár, Hungary	15k	Clay	(Hungary) Réka Luca Jani	7–5, 6–3
Loss	4–3	Nov 2019	ITF Naples, United States	W25	Clay	(Australia) Seone Mendez	3–6, 4–6
Loss	4–4	Apr 2021	ITF Cordoba, Argentina	W25	Clay	(Brazil) Beatriz Haddad Maia	2–6, 2–6
Win	5–4	May 2021	ITF Naples, United States	W25	Clay	(Romania) Irina Fetecău	6–0, 6–3
Win	6–4	May 2021	ITF Pelham, United States	W25	Clay	(United States) Jamie Loeb	6–7^{(5)}, 6–4, 6–3
Loss	6–5	Jul 2021	ITF The Hague, Netherlands	W25	Clay	(Netherlands) Quirine Lemoine	5–7, 3–6
Win	7–5	Sep 2021	ITF Frýdek-Místek, Czech Republic	W25	Clay	(Georgia (country)) Sofia Shapatava	6–2, 6–1
Win	8–5	Oct 2021	ITF Rio do Sul, Brazil	W25	Clay	(Chile) Daniela Seguel	6–1, 6–0
Win	9–5	Nov 2021	Aberto da República, Brazil	W60	Clay (i)	(Russia) Elina Avanesyan	0–6, 6–4, 6–3
Win	10–5	Jul 2022	Internazionali di Cordenons, Italy	W60	Clay	Elina Avanesyan	6–2, 6–0
Loss	10–6	Oct 2022	Tennis Classic of Macon, United States	W60	Hard	(United States) Madison Brengle	3–6, 1–6
Win	11–6	Nov 2022	Barranquilla Open, Colombia	W60	Hard	(Brazil) Laura Pigossi	6–2, 7–5
Loss	11–7	Oct 2023	Tennis Classic of Macon, United States	W80	Hard	(United States) Taylor Townsend	3–6, 4–6
Loss	11–8	Nov 2023	Charleston Pro, United States	W100	Clay	(United States) Emma Navarro	1–6, 1–6
Loss	11–9	Apr 2024	Oeiras CETO Open, Portugal	W100	Clay	(Croatia) Jana Fett	0–6, 2–6
Loss	11–10	Jan 2025	ITF New Delhi, India	W50+H	Hard	Tatiana Prozorova	6–4, 6–7^{(6)}, 4–6
Win	12–10	Jun 2025	Internationaux de Blois, France	W75	Clay	(France) Julie Belgraver	7–5, 6–3

=== Doubles: 13 (9 titles, 4 runner-ups) ===
Legend W100 tournaments (1–0) W75 tournaments (0–1) W25 tournaments (4–2) W10/15 tournaments (4–1)	Finals by surface Clay (9–3) Carpet (0–1)

Result	W–L	Date	Tournament	Tier	Surface	Partner	Opponents	Score
Win	1–0	Oct 2016	ITF Melilla, Spain	10k	Clay	(Croatia) Mariana Dražić	(Italy) Marianna Natali (Germany) Lisa Ponomar	6–1, 2–0 ret.
Win	2–0	Apr 2017	ITF Hammamet, Tunisia	15k	Clay	(United Kingdom) Maia Lumsden	(Chile) Fernanda Brito (Sweden) Fanny Östlund	6–4, 5–7, [10–4]
Win	3–0	May 2017	ITF Győr, Hungary	15k	Clay	(Austria) Mira Antonitsch	(Serbia) Tamara Čurović (China) Wang Xinyu	6–1, 6–2
Loss	3–1	Sep 2017	ITF Székesfehérvár, Hungary	15k	Clay	(Hungary) Réka Luca Jani	(Romania) Laura Ioana Andrei (Romania) Elena Bogdan	6–1, 2–6, [7–10]
Win	4–1	May 2018	ITF Kaposvár, Hungary	15k	Clay	(Hungary) Anna Bondár	(Ukraine) Yuliya Lysa (Russia) Maria Marfutina	7–6^{(6)}, 6–1
Loss	4–2	Oct 2018	ITF Óbidos, Portugal	25k	Carpet	(Latvia) Diāna Marcinkeviča	(Serbia) Natalija Kostić (Japan) Akiko Omae	3–6, 6–4, [7–10]
Win	5–2	Sep 2019	ITF St. Pölten, Austria	W25	Clay	(Romania) Irina Fetecău	(Hungary) Anna Bondár (Hungary) Réka Luca Jani	7–6^{(5)}, 0–6, [11–9]
Win	6–2	Jan 2020	Vero Beach Open, United States	W25	Clay	(Chinese Taipei) Hsu Chieh-yu	(Spain) Irene Burillo (Spain) Andrea Lázaro García	7–5, 4–6, [10–7]
Win	7–2	Mar 2021	ITF Buenos Aires, Argentina	W25	Clay	(Russia) Amina Anshba	(Greece) Valentini Grammatikopoulou (Netherlands) Richèl Hogenkamp	7–5, 6–2
Win	8–2	Apr 2021	ITF Cordoba, Argentina	W25	Clay	(Russia) Amina Anshba	(Chile) Bárbara Gatica (Brazil) Rebeca Pereira	6–3, 6–3
Loss	8–3	Jul 2021	ITF The Hague, Netherlands	W25	Clay	(Mexico) María Portillo Ramírez	(Belgium) Marie Benoît (Romania) Ioana Loredana Roșca	7–6^{(5)}, 5–7, [7–10]
Win	9–3	May 2022	Wiesbaden Open, Germany	W100	Clay	Amina Anshba	(Venezuela) Andrea Gámiz (Netherlands) Eva Vedder	6–2, 6–4
Loss	9–4	Mar 2025	Székesfehérvár Open, Hungary	W75	Clay (i)	(Hungary) Luca Udvardy	(Romania) Irina Bara (Georgia (country)) Ekaterine Gorgodze	7–6^{(7)}, 3–6, [3–10]

== Junior finals ==
=== ITF Junior Circuit ===
==== Singles: 6 (2 titles, 4 runner-ups) ====
Legend Grade 1 (1–0) Grade 2 (0–3) Grade 4 (0–1) Grade 5 (1–0)

Result	W–L	Date	Tournament	Tier	Surface	Opponent	Score
Loss	0–1	Apr 2014	ITF Marsa, Malta	Grade 4	Hard	(Czech Republic) Monika Kilnarová	4–6, 1–6
Win	1–1	Jun 2014	ITF Tirana, Albania	Grade 5	Hard	(Greece) Anastasia Rentouli	1–6, 6–4, 6–2
Loss	1–2	May 2015	ITF Villach, Austria	Grade 2	Clay	(Austria) Mira Antonitsch	3–6, 5–7
Win	2–2	Mar 2016	ITF São Paulo, Brazil	Grade 1	Clay	(United Kingdom) Emily Appleton	4–6, 6–4, 6–3
Loss	2–3	Aug 2016	ITF Budaörs, Hungary	Grade 2	Clay	(Latvia) Daniela Vismane	7–5, 3–6, 4–6
Loss	2–4	Oct 2016	ITF Pontevedra, Spain	Grade 2	Hard	(Russia) Varvara Gracheva	4–6, 6–4, 5–7

==== Doubles: 16 (11 titles, 5 runner-ups) ====
Legend Grade A (1–0) Grade 1 (1–2) Grade 2 (7–2) Grade 4 (1–1) Grade 5 (1–0)

Result	W–L	Date	Tournament	Tier	Surface	Partner	Opponents	Score
Loss	0–1	Mar 2014	ITF Doha, Qatar	Grade 4	Hard	(Turkey) Yağmur Akdemir	(Cyprus) Eliza Omirou (Cyprus) Maria Siopacha	1–4 ret.
Win	1–1	Apr 2014	ITF Marsa, Malta	Grade 4	Hard	(United States) Luciana Rabines	(Hungary) Friderika Lotti Mészáros (Greece) Anastasia Rentouli	4–6, 6–2, [10–6]
Win	2–1	Jun 2014	ITF Tirana, Albania	Grade 5	Hard	(Switzerland) Chiara Merico	(Austria) Sandra Friedl (Austria) Caroline Ilowska	6–1, 6–3
Win	3–1	Aug 2014	ITF Budapest, Hungary	Grade 2	Clay	(Hungary) Bianka Békefi	(Romania) Oana Gavrilă (Romania) Iulia Maria Ivașcu	6–3, 6–1
Win	4–1	Sep 2014	ITF Pančevo, Serbia	Grade 2	Clay	(Australia) Seone Mendez	(Italy) Liudmila Samsonova (Italy) Anna Turati	6–4, 6–4
Win	5–1	Sep 2014	ITF Novi Sad, Serbia	Grade 2	Clay	(Australia) Seone Mendez	(Japan) Haruna Arakawa (Japan) Natsuho Arakawa	6–3, 6–1
Win	6–1	Jan 2015	ITF Tunis, Tunisia	Grade 2	Hard	(Russia) Tatiana Makarova	(Turkey) Berfu Cengiz (Namibia) Lesedi Sheya Jacobs	1–6, 7–5 [10–6]
Win	7–1	Apr 2015	ITF Cap-d'Ail, France	Grade 2	Clay	(United Kingdom) Jodie Burrage	(Austria) Mira Antonitsch (Italy) Beatrice Torelli	6–3, 6–3
Loss	7–2	Jun 2015	ITF Berlin, Germany	Grade 1	Clay	(Ukraine) Dayana Yastremska	(Japan) Mayuka Aikawa (Mexico) Jéssica Hinojosa	6–1, 4–6, [6–10]
Win	8–2	Aug 2015	ITF Budapest, Hungary	Grade 2	Clay	(United Kingdom) Jodie Burrage	(Romania) Ioana Guna (Romania) Andreea Roșca	6–1, 6–0
Loss	8–3	Sep 2015	ITF Novi Sad, Serbia	Grade 2	Clay	(Germany) Irina Cantos Siemers	(Slovenia) Veronika Erjavec (Slovenia) Kaja Juvan	0–1 ret.
Win	9–3	Jan 2016	ITF Bratislava, Slovakia	Grade 2	Carpet (i)	(Czech Republic) Lucie Kaňková	(Russia) Amina Anshba (Czech Republic) Klára Hájková	3–6, 7–6^{(7–4)}, [10–4]
Win	10–3	Mar 2016	ITF Porto Alegre, Brazil	Grade A	Clay	(Ukraine) Dayana Yastremska	(United States) Caty McNally (United States) Natasha Subhash	7–6^{(7–4)}, 3–6, [13–11]
Loss	10–4	Apr 2016	ITF Villena, Spain	Grade 1	Clay	(Australia) Seone Mendez	(Russia) Amina Anshba (Belarus) Nika Shytkouskaya	4–6, 4–6
Win	11–4	Jul 2016	ITF Roehampton, UK	Grade 1	Grass	(United Kingdom) Jodie Burrage	(Russia) Olesya Pervushina (Russia) Anastasia Potapova	2–6, 6–4, [15–13]
Loss	11–5	Oct 2016	ITF Sanxenxo, Spain	Grade 2	Hard	(United Kingdom) Ali Collins	(Germany) Irina Cantos Siemers (Switzerland) Simona Waltert	6–4, 5–7, [10–12]
