= Iași Open =

Tournament information
- Event name: Concord Iași Open (men); Unicredit Iași Open (2024-), BCR Iași Open (2022-2023) (women)
- Founded: 2020
- Location: Iași, Romania
- Venue: Baza Sportivă Ciric
- Surface: Clay
- Website: iasiopen.com

Current champions (2026)
- Men's singles: (Hungary) Zsombor Piros
- Women's singles: (Egypt) Mayar Sherif
- Men's doubles: (Sweden) Erik Grevelius (Sweden) Adam Heinonen
- Women's doubles: (Czech Republic) Anastasia Dețiuc; Irina Khromacheva
ATP Tour
- Category: ATP Challenger 100
- Draw: 32S/24Q/16D
- Prize money: €118,000
WTA Tour
- Category: WTA 250 (2024-)
- Draw: 32S/24Q/16D
- Prize money: US$283,347

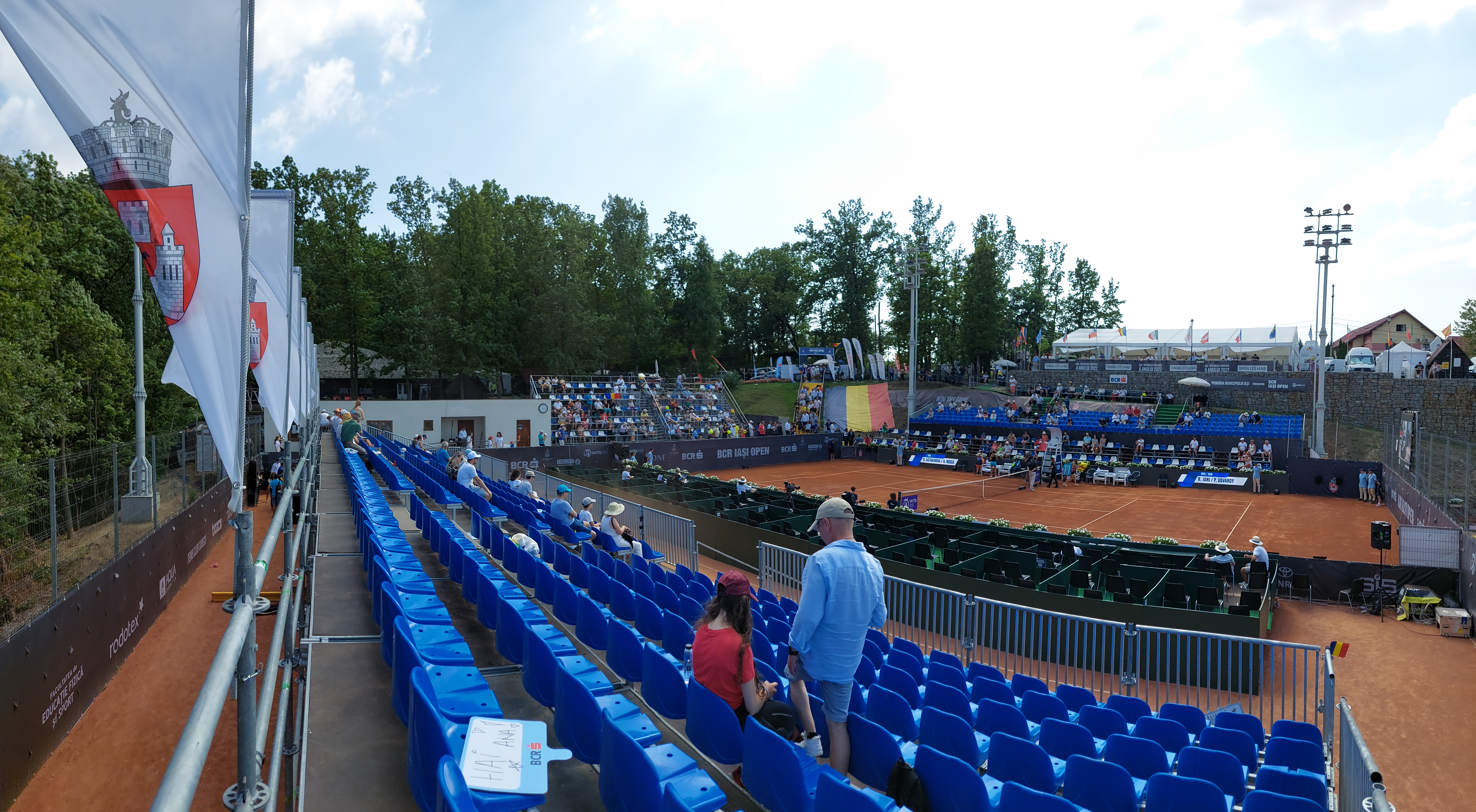
Main arena in 2022

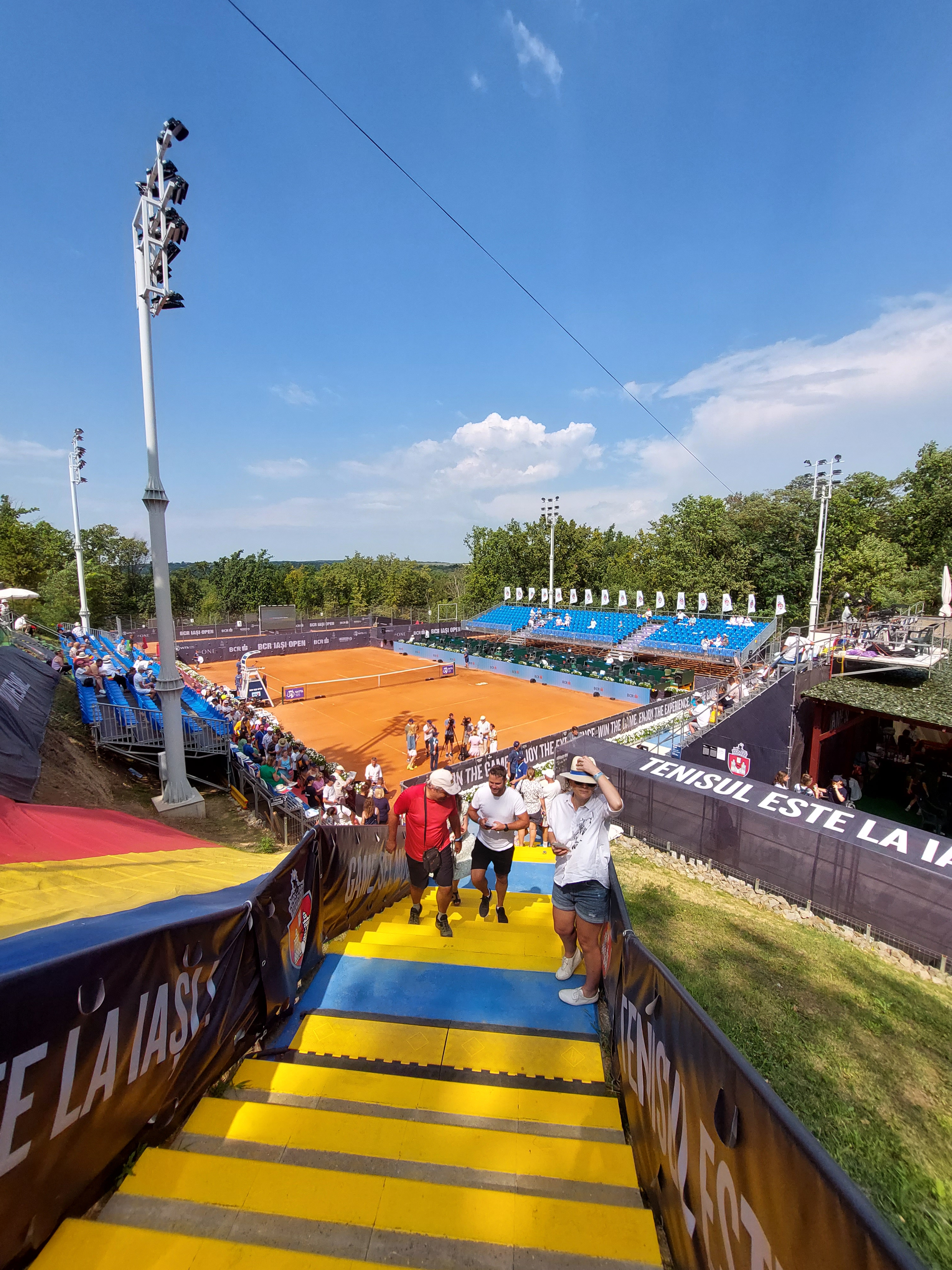
Main arena in 2022

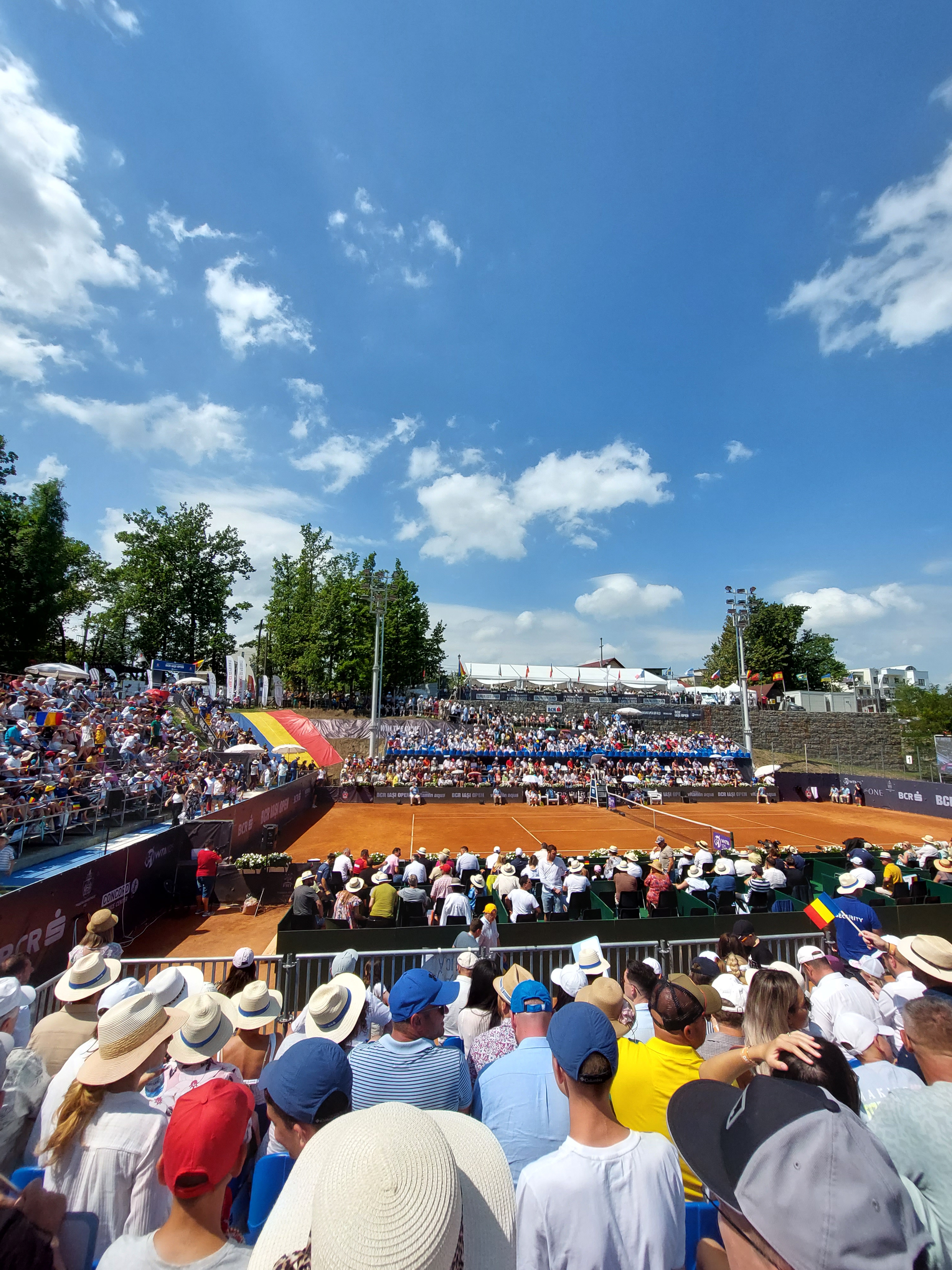
Finals 2022

The Iași Open (known as the Concord Iași Open for men and Unicredit Iași Open for women) is a professional tennis tournament played on clay courts. It is currently part of the WTA Tour and the ATP Challenger Tour, annually held in Iași, Romania since 2020 for the men and since 2022 for the women. It is a WTA 250 event since 2024. In 2025 it replaced the Budapest Grand Prix on the WTA Tour calendar.

== Past finals ==
=== Men's singles ===
Year	Champion	Runner-up	Score
2026	(Hungary) Zsombor Piros	(France) Titouan Droguet	6–1, 7–6^{(7–2)}
2025	(Denmark) Elmer Møller	(France) Titouan Droguet	3–6, 6–1, 7–6^{(7–2)}
2024	(Bolivia) Hugo Dellien	(Spain) Javier Barranco Cosano	6–1, 6–1
2023	(France) Hugo Gaston	(Spain) Bernabé Zapata Miralles	3–6, 6–0, 6–4
2022	(Brazil) Felipe Meligeni Alves	(Spain) Pablo Andújar	6–3, 4–6, 6–2
2021	(Czech Republic) Zdeněk Kolář	(France) Hugo Gaston	7–5, 4–6, 6–4
2020	(Spain) Carlos Taberner	(France) Mathias Bourgue	6–4, 7–6^{(7–4)}

=== Women's singles ===
Year	Champion	Runner-up	Score
2026	(Egypt) Mayar Sherif	(Spain) Paula Badosa	6–4, 4–0 ret.
2025	(Romania) Irina-Camelia Begu	(Switzerland) Jil Teichmann	6–0, 7–5
2024	Mirra Andreeva	Elina Avanesyan	5–7, 7–5, 4–0 ret.
⬆️ WTA 250 ⬆️
2023	(Romania) Ana Bogdan (2)	(Romania) Irina-Camelia Begu	6–2, 6–3
2022	(Romania) Ana Bogdan	(Hungary) Panna Udvardy	6–2, 3–6, 6–1

=== Men's doubles ===
Year	Champions	Runners-up	Score
2026	(Sweden) Erik Grevelius (Sweden) Adam Heinonen	(Serbia) Ivan Sabanov (Serbia) Matej Sabanov	6–4, 6–2
2025	(Poland) Szymon Kielan (Poland) Filip Pieczonka	(Canada) Cleeve Harper (United States) Ryan Seggerman	7–5, 6–3
2024	(Romania) Cezar Crețu (Romania) Bogdan Pavel	(Poland) Karol Drzewiecki (Poland) Piotr Matuszewski	2–6, 6–2, [10–4]
2023	(Colombia) Nicolás Barrientos (Pakistan) Aisam-ul-Haq Qureshi	(Romania) Gabi Adrian Boitan (Romania) Bogdan Pavel	6–3, 6–3
2022	(France) Geoffrey Blancaneaux (Argentina) Renzo Olivo	(Ecuador) Diego Hidalgo (Colombia) Cristian Rodríguez	6–4, 2–6, [10–6]
2021	(Brazil) Orlando Luz (Brazil) Felipe Meligeni Alves	(Argentina) Hernán Casanova (Spain) Roberto Ortega Olmedo	6–3, 6–4
2020	(Brazil) Rafael Matos (Brazil) João Menezes	(Philippines) Treat Huey (United States) Nathaniel Lammons	6–2, 6–2

=== Women's doubles ===
Year	Champions	Runners-up	Score
2026	(Czech Republic) Anastasia Dețiuc; Irina Khromacheva (2)	(Armenia) Alina Charaeva (Kazakhstan) Zhibek Kulambayeva	4–6, 6–2, [10–5]
2025	(Slovenia) Veronika Erjavec (2) (Hungary) Panna Udvardy	(Argentina) María Lourdes Carlé (Switzerland) Simona Waltert	7–5, 6–3
2024	(Kazakhstan) Anna Danilina; Irina Khromacheva	Alexandra Panova; Yana Sizikova	6–4, 6–2
⬆️ WTA 250 ⬆️
2023	(Slovenia) Veronika Erjavec (Slovenia) Dalila Jakupović	(Romania) Irina Bara (Romania) Monica Niculescu	6–4, 6–4
2022	Darya Astakhova (Romania) Andreea Roșca	(Hungary) Réka Luca Jani (Hungary) Panna Udvardy	7–5, 5–7, [10–7]

== Records and statistics ==
current through the 2026 Iași Open

The records include the WTA 125 editions held in 2022 and 2023 and the WTA 250 editions held from 2024 onward.

=== Singles ===
The records are compiled from the official tournament draws and results.

#	Titles
2	(Romania) Ana Bogdan
1	(Russia) Mirra Andreeva
1	(Romania) Irina-Camelia Begu
1	(Egypt) Mayar Sherif

#	Finals
2	(Romania) Ana Bogdan
2	(Romania) Irina-Camelia Begu
1	(Hungary) Panna Udvardy
1	(Russia) Mirra Andreeva
1	(Armenia) Elina Avanesyan
1	(Switzerland) Jil Teichmann
1	(Egypt) Mayar Sherif
1	(Spain) Paula Badosa

#	Matches won
10	(Romania) Ana Bogdan
9	(Romania) Irina-Camelia Begu
8	(Hungary) Panna Udvardy
6	(Switzerland) Jil Teichmann
6	(Armenia) Elina Avanesyan
6	(Slovenia) Tamara Zidanšek
6	(Romania) Jaqueline Cristian

#	Editions played
4	(Hungary) Panna Udvardy
4	(Romania) Miriam Bulgaru
4	(Switzerland) Simona Waltert
3	(Romania) Ana Bogdan
3	(Romania) Andreea Prisacariu
3	(Romania) Irina Bara
3	(Armenia) Elina Avanesyan

=== Youngest and oldest champions ===
Singles	Youngest	(Russia) Mirra Andreeva	17 years, 2 months	2024
Singles	Oldest	(Romania) Irina-Camelia Begu	34 years, 10 months	2025
Doubles	Youngest	(Russia) Darya Astakhova	20 years, 6 months	2022
Doubles	Oldest	(Romania) Monica Niculescu	35 years, 9 months	2023

=== Longest and shortest matches ===
==== Singles ====
Longest match by time and games played 2026 second round, 3 hours and 31 minutes and 38 games: (Slovenia) Tamara Zidanšek / 7^{7} / 6^{5} / 7; (Hungary) Anna Bondár / 6^{5} / 7^{7} / 5	Shortest match by games played 2022 first round, 12 games: (Spain) Rebeka Masarova / 6 / 6; (Australia) Olivia Tjandramulia / 0 / 0

==== Doubles ====
A match tiebreak is used in place of a full third set; therefore, matches decided in three sets are not directly comparable by total games with traditional best-of-three-set matches.
