= 2022 Internationaux de Tennis de Toulouse – Singles =

Singles
- 2022 Internationaux de Tennis de Toulouse

Final
- Champion: (Belgium) Kimmer Coppejans
- Runner-up: (France) Maxime Janvier
- Score: 6–7^{(8–10)}, 6–4, 6–3

Events
Singles	Doubles
- Internationaux de Tennis de Toulouse

This was the first edition of the tournament.

Kimmer Coppejans won the title after defeating Maxime Janvier 6–7^{(8–10)}, 6–4, 6–3 in the final.

== Seeds ==
1. (Spain) Carlos Taberner (second round)
2. (Sweden) Elias Ymer (second round)
3. (France) Alexandre Müller (first round)
4. (Italy) Gianluca Mager (second round)
5. (Argentina) Marco Trungelliti (quarterfinals)
6. (Argentina) Facundo Díaz Acosta (first round)
7. (Hungary) Fábián Marozsán (first round)
8. (Spain) Pol Martín Tiffon (first round)

== Draw ==
Key

- Q = Qualifier
- WC = Wild card
- LL = Lucky loser
- Alt = Alternate
- ITF = ITF entry
- PR = Protected ranking
- SR = Special ranking
- SE = Special exempt
- JE = Junior exempt
- JR = Junior Accelerator Programme entrant
- CO = College Accelerator Programme entrant
- NG = Next Gen Accelerator Program entrant
- w/o = Walkover
- r = Retired
- d = Defaulted

=== Finals ===
Semifinals
WC	(France) Titouan Droguet	1	4
(France) Maxime Janvier	6	6
(Germany) Louis Wessels	0	1
Q	(Belgium) Kimmer Coppejans	6	6

Final
(France) Maxime Janvier	7^{10}	4	3
Q	(Belgium) Kimmer Coppejans	6^{8}	6	6

=== Top half ===
First round
1	(Spain) C Taberner	6	6
WC	(France) Mathys Erhard	3	4
(Portugal) F Ferreira Silva	6^{5}	6	6
(Italy) L Giustino	7^{7}	3	4
(Croatia) D Ajduković	2	6	0
(Spain) N Sánchez Izquierdo	6	4	6
WC	(France) T Droguet	4	6	6
6	(Argentina) F Díaz Acosta	6	1	4
4	(Italy) G Mager	6	7^{10}
Q	Andrey Chepelev	3	6^{8}
(Chile) G Lama	4	6^{9}
(France) M Janvier	6	7^{11}
Q	(France) A Fils	7^{11}	6
Q	(Poland) K Drzewiecki	6^{9}	1
Q	(France) U Blanchet	7	6
8	(Spain) P Martín Tiffon	5	3

Second round
1	(Spain) C Taberner	4	6^{4}
(Portugal) F Ferreira Silva	6	7^{7}
(Spain) N Sánchez Izquierdo	4	6^{1}
WC	(France) T Droguet	6	7^{7}
4	(Italy) G Mager	6^{3}	4
(France) M Janvier	7^{7}	6
Q	(France) A Fils	6	6
Q	(France) U Blanchet	4	4

Quarterfinals
(Portugal) F Ferreira Silva	4	6	2
WC	(France) T Droguet	6	3	6
(France) M Janvier	6	3	6
Q	(France) A Fils	4	6	1

Semifinals
WC	(France) T Droguet	1	4
(France) M Janvier	6	6

=== Bottom half ===
First round
5	(Argentina) M Trungelliti	1	6	6
Q	(France) Jurgen Briand	6	3	2
Alt	I Gakhov	5	6	7^{8}
LL	(Argentina) RA Burruchaga	7	0	6^{6}
(Switzerland) J Nikles	3	6	5
(Germany) L Wessels	6	2	7
Alt	(Lebanon) B Hassan	6	6
3	(France) A Müller	1	3
7	(Hungary) F Marozsán	7	4	5
Q	(Belgium) K Coppejans	5	6	7
(Kazakhstan) T Skatov	6^{5}	6^{7}
WC	(France) A Reymond	7^{7}	7^{9}
(Netherlands) J Sels	4	2
(France) L Van Assche	6	6
Alt	(Portugal) J Domingues	4	1
2	(Sweden) E Ymer	6	6

Second round
5	(Argentina) M Trungelliti	6	3	6
Alt	I Gakhov	3	6	3
(Germany) L Wessels	6^{3}	6	6
Alt	(Lebanon) B Hassan	7^{7}	2	3
Q	(Belgium) K Coppejans	6	6
WC	(France) A Reymond	0	0
(France) L Van Assche	3	6	6
2	(Sweden) E Ymer	6	4	1

Quarterfinals
5	(Argentina) M Trungelliti	6^{4}	6	6^{4}
(Germany) L Wessels	7^{7}	2	7^{7}
Q	(Belgium) K Coppejans	6	6
(France) L Van Assche	1	3

Semifinals
(Germany) L Wessels	0	1
Q	(Belgium) K Coppejans	6	6
