= 2024 Iași Open – Men's singles =

Men's singles
- 2024 Iași Open

Final
- Champion: (Bolivia) Hugo Dellien
- Runner-up: (Spain) Javier Barranco Cosano
- Score: 6–1, 6–1

Events
Singles	men	women
Doubles	men	women
← 2023 ·	Iași Open	· 2025 →

Hugo Gaston was the defending champion but chose not to defend his title.

Hugo Dellien won the title after defeating Javier Barranco Cosano 6–1, 6–1 in the final.

== Seeds ==
1. (Argentina) Camilo Ugo Carabelli (second round)
2. (Spain) Albert Ramos Viñolas (first round)
3. (Argentina) Juan Manuel Cerúndolo (second round)
4. (Argentina) Román Andrés Burruchaga (first round)
5. (United States) Nicolas Moreno de Alboran (first round)
6. (Bolivia) Hugo Dellien (champion)
7. (Brazil) Gustavo Heide (first round)
8. (France) Enzo Couacaud (semifinals)

== Draw ==
=== Key ===
- Q = Qualifier
- WC = Wild card
- LL = Lucky loser
- Alt = Alternate
- ITF = ITF entry
- PR = Protected ranking
- SR = Special ranking
- SE = Special exempt
- JE = Junior exempt
- JR = Junior Accelerator Programme entrant
- CO = College Accelerator Programme entrant
- NG = Next Gen Accelerator Program entrant
- w/o = Walkover
- r = Retired
- d = Defaulted

=== Finals ===
Semifinals
6	(Bolivia) Hugo Dellien	7^{7}	6
(Paraguay) Daniel Vallejo	6^{4}	2
8	(France) Enzo Couacaud	6^{5}	5
(Spain) Javier Barranco Cosano	7^{7}	7

Final
6	(Bolivia) Hugo Dellien	6	6
(Spain) Javier Barranco Cosano	1	1

=== Top half ===
First round
1	(Argentina) C Ugo Carabelli	7	6
(Czech Republic) J Veselý	5	3
Q	(Romania) Radu Mihai Papoe	1	2
(France) V Royer	6	6
Q	(Romania) Sebastian Gima	0	6^{6}
(Jordan) A Shelbayh	6	7^{8}
LL	(Latvia) R Strombachs	5	6	4
6	(Bolivia) H Dellien	7	4	6
3	(Argentina) JM Cerúndolo	6	6
Q	(Moldova) I Snițari	4	3
(Paraguay) AD Vallejo	6	6
Q	(Argentina) AL Lingua Lavallén	4	4
Q	(Czech Republic) M Vrbenský	6	3	1
(Spain) M Landaluce	1	6	6
WC	(Romania) GA Boitan	7^{7}	3	6
5	(United States) N Moreno de Alboran	6^{5}	6	4

Second round
1	(Argentina) C Ugo Carabelli	6^{3}	2
(France) V Royer	7^{7}	6
(Jordan) A Shelbayh	4	4
6	(Bolivia) H Dellien	6	6
3	(Argentina) JM Cerúndolo	3	3
(Paraguay) AD Vallejo	6	6
(Spain) M Landaluce	6	6
WC	(Romania) GA Boitan	4	3

Quarterfinals
(France) V Royer	4	7^{7}	3
6	(Bolivia) H Dellien	6	6^{5}	6
(Paraguay) AD Vallejo	6	6
(Spain) M Landaluce	2	1

Semifinals
6	(Bolivia) H Dellien	7^{7}	6
(Paraguay) AD Vallejo	6^{4}	2

=== Bottom half ===
First round
8	(France) E Couacaud	4	6	6
(Bosnia and Herzegovina) N Fatić	6	3	4
(France) M Janvier	3	6	3
(Czech Republic) D Svrčina	6	3	6
(Kazakhstan) D Popko	6	6
(Bolivia) M Dellien	4	2
WC	(Romania) C Crețu	6	6
4	(Argentina) RA Burruchaga	4	3
7	(Brazil) G Heide	7^{9}	2	3
Alt	(Ukraine) V Sachko	6^{7}	6	6
(Spain) J Barranco Cosano	6	6
WC	(Romania) ND Ionel	1	2
Q	B Bobrov	7^{7}	5
Alt	(Romania) FC Jianu	6^{1}	2^{r}
(Argentina) JP Ficovich	7^{8}	6
2	(Spain) A Ramos Viñolas	6^{6}	4

Second round
8	(France) E Couacaud	6	5	6
(Czech Republic) D Svrčina	0	7	2
(Kazakhstan) D Popko	7	6
WC	(Romania) C Crețu	5	3
Alt	(Ukraine) V Sachko	4	4
(Spain) J Barranco Cosano	6	6
Q	B Bobrov	6	1	2
(Argentina) JP Ficovich	4	6	6

Quarterfinals
8	(France) E Couacaud	6^{4}	6	7^{12}
(Kazakhstan) D Popko	7^{7}	2	6^{10}
(Spain) J Barranco Cosano	7^{7}	6
(Argentina) JP Ficovich	6^{1}	3

Semifinals
8	(France) E Couacaud	6^{5}	5
(Spain) J Barranco Cosano	7^{7}	7
