= 2022 Internationaux de Tennis de Toulouse – Doubles =

Doubles
- 2022 Internationaux de Tennis de Toulouse

Final
- Champions: (France) Maxime Janvier (Tunisia) Malek Jaziri
- Runners-up: (France) Théo Arribagé (France) Titouan Droguet
- Score: 6–3, 7–6^{(7–5)}

Events
Singles	Doubles
Internationaux de Tennis de Toulouse	· 2023 →

This was the first edition of the tournament.

Maxime Janvier and Malek Jaziri won the title after defeating Théo Arribagé and Titouan Droguet 6–3, 7–6^{(7–5)} in the final.

== Seeds ==
1. (Monaco) Romain Arneodo / (Venezuela) Luis David Martínez (quarterfinals)
2. (France) Jonathan Eysseric / (New Zealand) Artem Sitak (first round)
3. (India) Arjun Kadhe / (Brazil) Fernando Romboli (first round, retired)
4. (Poland) Karol Drzewiecki / (Finland) Patrik Niklas-Salminen (first round)

== Draw ==
=== Key ===
- Q = Qualifier
- WC = Wild card
- LL = Lucky loser
- Alt = Alternate
- ITF = ITF entry
- PR = Protected ranking
- SR = Special ranking
- SE = Special exempt
- JE = Junior exempt
- JR = Junior Accelerator Programme entrant
- CO = College Accelerator Programme entrant
- NG = Next Gen Accelerator Program entrant
- w/o = Walkover
- r = Retired
- d = Defaulted

First round
1	(Monaco) R Arneodo (Venezuela) LD Martínez	6	7
(France) U Blanchet (France) L Sanchez	4	5
(Belgium) K Coppejans (Belgium) J De Loore	2	7	[8]
(France) T Arribagé (France) T Droguet	6	5	[10]
4	(Poland) K Drzewiecki (Finland) P Niklas-Salminen	7^{7}	4	[9]
(Croatia) Z Babić (Poland) P Matuszewski	6^{3}	6	[11]
(Italy) L Giustino (Argentina) M Trungelliti	6	6
Andrey Chepelev; I Gakhov	3	4
WC	(France) G Jacq (France) A Reymond	6	6
WC	(France) Maxence Brovillé (France) Axel Garcian	4	4
(France) M Janvier (Tunisia) M Jaziri	6	1
3	(India) A Kadhe (Brazil) F Romboli	3	0^{r}
(Argentina) RA Burruchaga (Argentina) F Díaz Acosta	4	4
(Netherlands) J Sels (Germany) L Wessels	6	6
(Bolivia) B Arias (Bolivia) F Zeballos	6	3	[10]
2	(France) J Eysseric (New Zealand) A Sitak	4	6	[6]

Quarterfinals
1	(Monaco) R Arneodo (Venezuela) LD Martínez	6	3	[4]
(France) T Arribagé (France) T Droguet	2	6	[10]
(Croatia) Z Babić (Poland) P Matuszewski	6	7
(Italy) L Giustino (Argentina) M Trungelliti	2	5
WC	(France) G Jacq (France) A Reymond	3	4
(France) M Janvier (Tunisia) M Jaziri	6	6
(Netherlands) J Sels (Germany) L Wessels	3	6^{4}
(Bolivia) B Arias (Bolivia) F Zeballos	6	7^{7}

Semifinals
(France) T Arribagé (France) T Droguet	6	4	[11]
(Croatia) Z Babić (Poland) P Matuszewski	2	6	[9]
(France) M Janvier (Tunisia) M Jaziri	6	7^{9}
(Bolivia) B Arias (Bolivia) F Zeballos	3	6^{7}

Final
(France) T Arribagé (France) T Droguet	3	6^{5}
(France) M Janvier (Tunisia) M Jaziri	6	7^{7}
