= 2025 Iași Open – Men's doubles =

Men's doubles
- 2025 Iași Open

Final
- Champions: (Poland) Szymon Kielan (Poland) Filip Pieczonka
- Runners-up: (Canada) Cleeve Harper (United States) Ryan Seggerman
- Score: 7–5, 6–3

Events
Singles	men	women
Doubles	men	women
← 2024 ·	Iași Open	· 2026 →

Cezar Crețu and Bogdan Pavel were the defending champions but chose to defend their title with different partners. Crețu partnered Nicholas David Ionel but lost in the first round to Szymon Kielan and Filip Pieczonka. Pavel partnered Alexandru Jecan but lost in the first round to Arjun Kadhe and Vijay Sundar Prashanth.

Kielan and Pieczonka won the title after defeating Cleeve Harper and Ryan Seggerman 7–5, 6–3 in the final.

== Seeds ==
1. (Canada) Cleeve Harper / (United States) Ryan Seggerman (final)
2. (United States) George Goldhoff / (France) Grégoire Jacq (quarterfinals)
3. (India) Arjun Kadhe / (India) Vijay Sundar Prashanth (semifinals)
4. (Romania) Victor Vlad Cornea / (Spain) Sergio Martos Gornés (first round)

== Draw ==
=== Key ===
- Q = Qualifier
- WC = Wild card
- LL = Lucky loser
- Alt = Alternate
- ITF = ITF entry
- PR = Protected ranking
- SR = Special ranking
- SE = Special exempt
- JE = Junior exempt
- JR = Junior Accelerator Programme entrant
- CO = College Accelerator Programme entrant
- NG = Next Gen Accelerator Program entrant
- w/o = Walkover
- r = Retired
- d = Defaulted

=== Draw ===
First round
1	(Canada) C Harper (United States) R Seggerman	w/o
(Spain) O Roca Batalla (Spain) C Taberner
(Bolivia) M Dellien (Bolivia) F Zeballos	4	6	[11]
(Brazil) JL Reis da Silva (Chile) M Soto	6	2	[9]
4	(Romania) V Cornea (Spain) S Martos Gornés	6	4	[6]
(India) S Banthia (Bulgaria) A Donski	1	6	[10]
(Czech Republic) H Bartoň (Czech Republic) M Vrbenský	4	6	[10]
WC	(France) H Gaston (Romania) Daniel Uta	6	3	[8]
(Zimbabwe) CJ Lock (Netherlands) T Loof	6	6
(Czech Republic) J Jermář (Serbia) S Latinović	3	3
(Romania) A Jecan (Romania) B Pavel	4	3
3	(India) A Kadhe (India) VS Prashanth	6	6
WC	(Romania) C Crețu (Romania) ND Ionel	3	6	[9]
(Poland) S Kielan (Poland) F Pieczonka	6	2	[11]
(France) L Sanchez (Poland) S Walków	4	2
2	(United States) G Goldhoff (France) G Jacq	6	6

Quarterfinals
1	(Canada) C Harper (United States) R Seggerman	6	7^{7}
(Bolivia) M Dellien (Bolivia) F Zeballos	4	6^{4}
(India) S Banthia (Bulgaria) A Donski	4	6	[10]
(Czech Republic) H Bartoň (Czech Republic) M Vrbenský	6	4	[4]
(Zimbabwe) CJ Lock (Netherlands) T Loof	4	6^{4}
3	(India) A Kadhe (India) VS Prashanth	6	7^{7}
(Poland) S Kielan (Poland) F Pieczonka	6	6
2	(United States) G Goldhoff (France) G Jacq	4	4

Semifinals
1	(Canada) C Harper (United States) R Seggerman	3	7	[10]
(India) S Banthia (Bulgaria) A Donski	6	5	[8]
3	(India) A Kadhe (India) VS Prashanth	6	6^{6}	[7]
(Poland) S Kielan (Poland) F Pieczonka	2	7^{8}	[10]

Final
1	(Canada) C Harper (United States) R Seggerman	5	3
(Poland) S Kielan (Poland) F Pieczonka	7	6
