= 2025 Iași Open – Women's doubles =

Women's doubles
- 2025 Iași Open

Final
- Champions: (Slovenia) Veronika Erjavec (Hungary) Panna Udvardy
- Runners-up: (Argentina) María Lourdes Carlé (Switzerland) Simona Waltert
- Score: 7–5, 6–3

Events
Singles	men	women
Doubles	men	women
← 2024 ·	Iași Open	· 2026 →

Veronika Erjavec and Panna Udvardy defeated María Lourdes Carlé and Simona Waltert in the final, 7–5, 6–3 to win the women's doubles tennis title at the 2025 Iași Open. It was the first WTA Tour doubles title for both players.

Anna Danilina and Irina Khromacheva were the reigning champions, but did not participate due this year.

== Seeds ==
1. Iryna Shymanovich / (Czech Republic) Anna Sisková (quarterfinals)
2. (United States) Quinn Gleason / (Brazil) Ingrid Martins (quarterfinals)
3. (United Kingdom) Emily Appleton / (Netherlands) Isabelle Haverlag (semifinals)
4. (Poland) Maja Chwalińska / (Czech Republic) Anastasia Dețiuc (quarterfinals)

== Draw ==
=== Key ===
- Q = Qualifier
- WC = Wild card
- LL = Lucky loser
- Alt = Alternate
- ITF = ITF entry
- PR = Protected ranking
- SR = Special ranking
- SE = Special exempt
- JE = Junior exempt
- JR = Junior Accelerator Programme entrant
- CO = College Accelerator Programme entrant
- NG = Next Gen Accelerator Program entrant
- w/o = Walkover
- r = Retired
- d = Defaulted

=== Draw ===
First round
1	I Shymanovich (Czech Republic) A Sisková	6	6
WC	(Romania) A Bogdan (Switzerland) J Teichmann	2	2
(Spain) Y Cavallé Reimers (Spain) A Herrero Liñana	3	6	[10]
(United States) J Aney (United States) J Failla	6	3	[7]
4	(Poland) M Chwalińska (Czech Republic) A Dețiuc	6	6
(Spain) I Burillo (Spain) A Lázaro García	2	1
(Slovenia) V Erjavec (Hungary) P Udvardy	6	6
(Switzerland) N Karamoko (Netherlands) L Tran	4	2
(United Kingdom) A Barnett (France) E Lechemia	6	6
(China) S Feng (Belgium) K Zimmermann	3	4
WC	(Romania) G Crăciun (Romania) A Prisăcariu	2	3
3	(United Kingdom) E Appleton (Netherlands) I Haverlag	6	6
(Algeria) I Ibbou (Netherlands) B Schoofs	6^{6}	4
(Argentina) ML Carlé (Switzerland) S Waltert	7^{8}	6
A Anshba (Spain) A Bolsova	6	5	[5]
2	(United States) Q Gleason (Brazil) I Martins	4	7	[10]

Quarterfinals
1	I Shymanovich (Czech Republic) A Sisková	6^{4}	4
(Spain) Y Cavallé Reimers (Spain) A Herrero Liñana	7^{7}	6
4	(Poland) M Chwalińska (Czech Republic) A Dețiuc	5	1
(Slovenia) V Erjavec (Hungary) P Udvardy	7	6
(United Kingdom) A Barnett (France) E Lechemia	4	6	[4]
3	(United Kingdom) E Appleton (Netherlands) I Haverlag	6	3	[10]
(Argentina) ML Carlé (Switzerland) S Waltert	3	6	[10]
2	(United States) Q Gleason (Brazil) I Martins	6	2	[7]

Semifinals
(Spain) Y Cavallé Reimers (Spain) A Herrero Liñana	5	0
(Slovenia) V Erjavec (Hungary) P Udvardy	7	6
3	(United Kingdom) E Appleton (Netherlands) I Haverlag	0	4
(Argentina) ML Carlé (Switzerland) S Waltert	6	6

Final
(Slovenia) V Erjavec (Hungary) P Udvardy	7	6
(Argentina) ML Carlé (Switzerland) S Waltert	5	3
