= 2025 Slovak Open – Men's singles =

Men's singles
- 2025 Slovak Open

Final
- Champion: (Belgium) Alexander Blockx
- Runner-up: (France) Titouan Droguet
- Score: 6–4, 6–3

Events
Singles	men	women
Doubles	men	women
← 2024 ·	Slovak Open	· 2026 →

Roman Safiullin was the defending champion but chose not to defend his title.

Alexander Blockx won the title after defeating Titouan Droguet 6–4, 6–3 in the final.

== Seeds ==
1. (Belgium) Raphaël Collignon (semifinals)
2. (Chile) Alejandro Tabilo (first round)
3. (Serbia) Laslo Djere (second round)
4. (Germany) Jan-Lennard Struff (first round)
5. (Japan) Shintaro Mochizuki (first round)
6. (Austria) Filip Misolic (first round)
7. (Australia) Tristan Schoolkate (second round)
8. (Argentina) Thiago Agustín Tirante (second round)

== Draw ==
Key

- Q = Qualifier
- WC = Wild card
- LL = Lucky loser
- Alt = Alternate
- ITF = ITF entry
- PR = Protected ranking
- SR = Special ranking
- SE = Special exempt
- JE = Junior exempt
- JR = Junior Accelerator Programme entrant
- CO = College Accelerator Programme entrant
- NG = Next Gen Accelerator Program entrant
- w/o = Walkover
- r = Retired
- d = Defaulted

=== Finals ===
Semifinals
1	(Belgium) Raphaël Collignon	3	4
(Belgium) Alexander Blockx	6	6
Q	(France) Titouan Droguet	7	6
Q	(Luxembourg) Chris Rodesch	5	3

Final
(Belgium) Alexander Blockx	6	6
Q	(France) Titouan Droguet	4	3

=== Top half ===
First round
1	(Belgium) R Collignon	3	6	7^{7}
(Slovakia) L Klein	6	3	6^{1}
Q	(Ukraine) V Sachko	4	3
WC	(Switzerland) S Wawrinka	6	6
Alt	(Estonia) M Lajal	4	6	6
WC	(Slovakia) N Gombos	6	3	2
(Italy) F Passaro	4	5
8	(Argentina) TA Tirante	6	7
4	(Germany) J-L Struff	6	4	6^{5}
(Belgium) A Blockx	3	6	7^{7}
Q	(United Kingdom) J Choinski	2	3
(United Kingdom) B Harris	6	6
(Spain) M Landaluce	2	5
(Finland) O Virtanen	6	7
(United States) C Smith	4	6^{4}
7	(Australia) T Schoolkate	6	7^{7}

Second round
1	(Belgium) R Collignon	6	6
WC	(Switzerland) S Wawrinka	2	4
Alt	(Estonia) M Lajal	7	6
8	(Argentina) TA Tirante	5	3
(Belgium) A Blockx	6	6
(United Kingdom) B Harris	1	1
(Finland) O Virtanen	6	6
7	(Australia) T Schoolkate	2	4

Quarterfinals
1	(Belgium) R Collignon	6	6
Alt	(Estonia) M Lajal	4	4
(Belgium) A Blockx	4	6	6
(Finland) O Virtanen	6	3	2

Semifinals
1	(Belgium) R Collignon	3	4
(Belgium) A Blockx	6	6

=== Bottom half ===
First round
5	(Japan) S Mochizuki	6^{3}	6	4
Alt	(Italy) F Maestrelli	7^{7}	3	6
Q	(France) S Gueymard Wayenburg	4	4
Q	(Austria) D Pichler	6	6
WC	(Slovakia) A Molčan	3	5
Q	(France) T Droguet	6	7
(Serbia) D Lajović	3	6^{2}
3	(Serbia) L Djere	6	7^{7}
6	(Austria) F Misolic	6	6^{4}	4
(Chinese Taipei) C-h Tseng	1	7^{7}	6
(United States) E Spizzirri	7^{7}	6
Alt	(Tunisia) M Echargui	6^{3}	2
(Portugal) J Faria	3	6^{6}
(United States) M McDonald	6	7^{8}
Q	(Luxembourg) C Rodesch	6	6
2	(Chile) A Tabilo	4	4

Second round
Alt	(Italy) F Maestrelli	6	7
Q	(Austria) D Pichler	2	5
Q	(France) T Droguet	6	6
3	(Serbia) L Djere	1	4
(Chinese Taipei) C-h Tseng	2	2
(United States) E Spizzirri	6	6
(United States) M McDonald	6^{2}	7	5
Q	(Luxembourg) C Rodesch	7^{7}	5	7

Quarterfinals
Alt	(Italy) F Maestrelli	4	3
Q	(France) T Droguet	6	6
(United States) E Spizzirri	6^{7}	7^{7}	4
Q	(Luxembourg) C Rodesch	7^{9}	6^{1}	6

Semifinals
Q	(France) T Droguet	7	6
Q	(Luxembourg) C Rodesch	5	3
