= 2024 Iași Open =

- Date: 8–14 July (men); 21–26 July (women)
- Edition: 5th (men); 3rd (women)
- Category: ATP Challenger (men); WTA 250 (women)
- Draw: 32S / 16D / 24Q(men); 32S / 16D / 24Q(women)
- Prize money: €120,950 (men) €267,082 (women)
- Surface: Clay
- Location: Iași, Romania
- Venue: Baza Sportivă Ciric

Champions

Men's singles
- (Bolivia) Hugo Dellien

Women's singles
- Mirra Andreeva

Men's doubles
- (Romania) Cezar Crețu / (Romania) Bogdan Pavel

Women's doubles
- (Kazakhstan) Anna Danilina / Irina Khromacheva
← 2023 ·	Iași Open	· 2025 →

The 2024 Iași Open, known as the Unicredit Iași Open for women and Concord Iași Open for men, was a professional tennis tournament played on outdoor clay courts. It was the fifth edition of the men's tournament, which was part of the 2024 ATP Challenger Tour, and the third edition of the women's tournament, which was a WTA 250 tournament with a one-year license on the 2024 WTA Tour (upgraded from WTA 125 status in previous years). It took place in Iași, Romania between 8 and 14 July 2024 for the men and between 21 and 26 July for the women.

== Champions ==
=== Men's singles ===
- (Bolivia) Hugo Dellien def. (Spain) Javier Barranco Cosano 6–1, 6–1.

=== Women's singles ===
- Mirra Andreeva def. Elina Avanesyan, 5–7, 7–5, 4–0 ret.

=== Men's doubles ===
- (Romania) Cezar Crețu / (Romania) Bogdan Pavel def. (Poland) Karol Drzewiecki / (Poland) Piotr Matuszewski 2–6, 6–2, [10–4].

=== Women's doubles ===
- (Kazakhstan) Anna Danilina / Irina Khromacheva def. Alexandra Panova / Yana Sizikova, 6–4, 6–2

== Men's singles main-draw entrants ==
=== Seeds ===
Country	Player	Rank^{1}	Seed
ARG	Camilo Ugo Carabelli	100	1
ESP	Albert Ramos Viñolas	107	2
ARG	Juan Manuel Cerúndolo	139	3
ARG	Román Andrés Burruchaga	142	4
USA	Nicolas Moreno de Alboran	146	5
BOL	Hugo Dellien	171	6
BRA	Gustavo Heide	185	7
FRA	Enzo Couacaud	195	8

- ^{1} Rankings as of 1 July 2024.

=== Other entrants ===
The following players received wildcards into the singles main draw:

- (Romania) Gabi Adrian Boitan
- (Romania) Cezar Crețu
- (Romania) Nicholas David Ionel

The following players received entry into the singles main draw as alternates:

- (Romania) Filip Cristian Jianu
- (Ukraine) Vitaliy Sachko

The following players received entry from the qualifying draw:

- Bogdan Bobrov
- (Romania) Sebastian Gima
- (Argentina) Alejo Lorenzo Lingua Lavallén
- (Romania) Radu Mihai Papoe
- (Moldova) Ilya Snițari
- (Czech Republic) Michael Vrbenský

The following player received entry as a lucky loser:

- (Latvia) Robert Strombachs

== Women's singles main-draw entrants ==
=== Seeds ===
Country	Player	Rank^{1}	Seed
	Mirra Andreeva	31	1
GER	Tatjana Maria	60	2
ROU	Jaqueline Cristian	66	3
	Anna Blinkova	74	4
	Elina Avanesyan	75	5
ITA	Martina Trevisan	77	6
ARG	María Lourdes Carlé	93	7
HUN	Anna Bondár	98	8

- ^{1} Rankings as of 15 July 2024.

=== Other entrants ===
The following players received wildcards into the singles main draw:

- (Romania) Irina Bara
- (Romania) Miriam Bulgaru
- (Romania) Elena-Gabriela Ruse

The following players received entry from the qualifying draw:

- (Belgium) Marie Benoît
- Aliona Falei
- (France) Séléna Janicijevic
- (United States) Varvara Lepchenko
- (Bulgaria) Gergana Topalova
- (Switzerland) Simona Waltert

The following players received entry as lucky losers:

- (Croatia) Lea Bošković
- (Italy) Nuria Brancaccio

=== Withdrawals ===
- (Romania) Ana Bogdan → replaced by (France) Chloé Paquet
- (United States) Bernarda Pera → replaced by (Spain) Nuria Párrizas Díaz
- (Kazakhstan) Yulia Putintseva → replaced by (Serbia) Olga Danilović
- (Netherlands) Arantxa Rus → replaced by (Spain) Marina Bassols Ribera
- (Egypt) Mayar Sherif → replaced by (Romania) Anca Todoni
- (Germany) Laura Siegemund → replaced by (Italy) Nuria Brancaccio
- (Japan) Moyuka Uchijima → replaced by (Croatia) Lea Bošković

== Women's doubles main-draw entrants ==
=== Seeds ===
Country	Player	Country	Player	Rank^{†}	Seed
KAZ	Anna Danilina		Irina Khromacheva	94	1
	Alexandra Panova		Yana Sizikova	98	2
GBR	Maia Lumsden	CZE	Anna Sisková	138	3
ITA	Angelica Moratelli	USA	Sabrina Santamaria	159	4

† Rankings are as of 15 July 2024

=== Other entrants ===
The following pairs received wildcards into the main draw:

- (Romania) Miriam Bulgaru / (Romania) Georgia Crăciun
- (Romania) Cristina Dinu / (Romania) Andreea Prisăcariu
