= 2025 Iași Open – Women's singles =

Women's singles
- 2025 Iași Open

Final
- Champion: (Romania) Irina-Camelia Begu
- Runner-up: (Switzerland) Jil Teichmann
- Score: 6–0, 7–5

Details
- Draw: 32
- Seeds: 8

Events
Singles	men	women
Doubles	men	women
← 2024 ·	Iași Open	· 2026 →

Irina-Camelia Begu defeated Jil Teichmann in the final, 6–0, 7–5 to win the women's singles tennis title at the 2025 Iași Open. It was her sixth WTA Tour singles title, and first since 2022.

Mirra Andreeva was the reigning champion, but did not participate this year.

== Seeds ==
1. (Armenia) Elina Avanesyan (second round)
2. (Romania) Jaqueline Cristian (semifinals)
3. (United States) Ann Li (second round)
4. (Spain) Nuria Párrizas Díaz (first round, retired)
5. (France) Varvara Gracheva (second round)
6. (Switzerland) Jil Teichmann (final)
7. (Romania) Irina-Camelia Begu (champion)
8. (United Kingdom) Francesca Jones (second round)

== Draw ==
=== Key ===
- Q = Qualifier
- WC = Wild card
- LL = Lucky loser
- Alt = Alternate
- ITF = ITF entry
- PR = Protected ranking
- SR = Special ranking
- SE = Special exempt
- JE = Junior exempt
- JR = Junior Accelerator Programme entrant
- CO = College Accelerator Programme entrant
- NG = Next Gen Accelerator Program entrant
- w/o = Walkover
- r = Retired
- d = Defaulted

=== Finals ===
Semifinals
(Romania) Sorana Cîrstea	4	3
6	(Switzerland) Jil Teichmann	6	6
7	(Romania) Irina-Camelia Begu	6	6
2	(Romania) Jaqueline Cristian	4	4

Final
6	(Switzerland) Jil Teichmann	0	5
7	(Romania) Irina-Camelia Begu	6	7

=== Top half ===
First round
1	(Armenia) E Avanesyan	6	6
WC	(Romania) A Prisăcariu	3	3
WC	(Romania) PM Țig	6	2	2
(Argentina) ML Carlé	2	6	6
(Romania) S Cîrstea	6	6
PR	(Romania) M Buzărnescu	2	2
WC	(Romania) A Bogdan	5	2
5	(France) V Gracheva	7	6
4	(Spain) N Párrizas Díaz	7	5	1^{r}
Q	(Spain) I Burillo	5	7	4
(Switzerland) S Waltert	6	6
PR	(Latvia) A Sevastova	3	3
I Shymanovich	6	4	2
(Poland) M Chwalińska	4	6	6
WC	(Romania) M Bulgaru	6	6^{2}	1
6	(Switzerland) J Teichmann	1	7^{7}	6

Second round
1	(Armenia) E Avanesyan	6^{4}	2
(Argentina) ML Carlé	7^{7}	6
(Romania) S Cîrstea	6	6
5	(France) V Gracheva	2	4
Q	(Spain) I Burillo	4	6^{2}
(Switzerland) S Waltert	6	7^{7}
(Poland) M Chwalińska	6^{5}	2
6	(Switzerland) J Teichmann	7^{7}	6

Quarterfinals
(Argentina) ML Carlé	1	4
(Romania) S Cîrstea	6	6
(Switzerland) S Waltert	7	1	5
6	(Switzerland) J Teichmann	5	6	7

Semifinals
(Romania) S Cîrstea	4	3
6	(Switzerland) J Teichmann	6	6

=== Bottom half ===
First round
7	(Romania) I-C Begu	6	6
(Japan) N Hibino	1	2
Q	(Romania) GS Popa	2	5
(Andorra) V Jiménez Kasintseva	6	7
(Poland) K Kawa	4	6	6^{2}
Q	(Czech Republic) A Sisková	6	4	7^{7}
(Spain) G Maristany	6	2	2
3	(United States) A Li	3	6	6
8	(United Kingdom) F Jones	6	6
Q	(Spain) A Herrero Liñana	3	2
Q	(France) M Rouvroy	3	6	5
(Hungary) P Udvardy	6	2	7
(Croatia) J Fett	7^{8}	6
(Slovenia) V Erjavec	6^{6}	2
Q	D Lodikova	1	4
2	(Romania) J Cristian	6	6

Second round
7	(Romania) I-C Begu	3	6	6
(Andorra) V Jiménez Kasintseva	6	3	3
Q	(Czech Republic) A Sisková	6	6
3	(United States) A Li	3	3
8	(United Kingdom) F Jones	4	3
(Hungary) P Udvardy	6	6
(Croatia) J Fett	1^{r}
2	(Romania) J Cristian	4

Quarterfinals
7	(Romania) I-C Begu	6	3	7
Q	(Czech Republic) A Sisková	2	6	5
(Hungary) P Udvardy	3	4
2	(Romania) J Cristian	6	6

Semifinals
7	(Romania) I-C Begu	6	6
2	(Romania) J Cristian	4	4

== Qualifying ==
=== Seeds ===
1. (Spain) Andrea Lázaro García (first round)
2. (Australia) Arina Rodionova (first round)
3. (France) Séléna Janicijevic (qualifying competition)
4. (France) Julie Belgraver (first round)
5. (Brazil) Carolina Alves (first round)
6. (Spain) Irene Burillo (qualified)
7. (Bulgaria) Lia Karatantcheva (first round)
8. (Spain) Aliona Bolsova (qualifying competition)
9. (Italy) Silvia Ambrosio (qualifying competition)
10. (Indonesia) Priska Nugroho (first round)
11. (France) Margaux Rouvroy (qualified)
12. (Serbia) Mia Ristić (qualifying competition)

=== Qualifiers ===
1. (Romania) Giulia Safina Popa
2. (Czech Republic) Anna Sisková
3. Daria Lodikova
4. (France) Margaux Rouvroy
5. (Spain) Alicia Herrero Liñana
6. (Spain) Irene Burillo

=== Qualifying draw ===
==== First qualifier ====
First round
1	(Spain) Andrea Lázaro García	6^{10}	4
WC	(Romania) Giulia Safina Popa	7^{12}	6
(United States) Jessica Failla	1	2
9	(Italy) Silvia Ambrosio	6	6

Qualifying competition
WC	(Romania) Giulia Safina Popa	7^{7}	1	6
9	(Italy) Silvia Ambrosio	6^{5}	6	3

==== Second qualifier ====
First round
2	(Australia) Arina Rodionova	3	6	5
(Czech Republic) Anna Sisková	6	4	7
WC	(Romania) Anastasia Necula	1	0
8	(Spain) Aliona Bolsova	6	6

Qualifying competition
(Czech Republic) Anna Sisková	3	6	6
8	(Spain) Aliona Bolsova	6	3	0

==== Third qualifier ====
First round
3	(France) Séléna Janicijevic	6	7
(Netherlands) Lian Tran	0	5
Daria Lodikova	7^{7}	7
10	(Indonesia) Priska Nugroho	6^{3}	5

Qualifying competition
3	(France) Séléna Janicijevic	6^{4}	6^{8}
Daria Lodikova	7^{7}	7^{10}

==== Fourth qualifier ====
First round
4	(France) Julie Belgraver	6	5	1
(Romania) Georgia Crăciun	2	7	6
WC	(Romania) Lavinia Tănasie	6	3	2
11	(France) Margaux Rouvroy	1	6	6

Qualifying competition
(Romania) Georgia Crăciun	6	3	4
11	(France) Margaux Rouvroy	0	6	6

==== Fifth qualifier ====
First round
5	(Brazil) Carolina Alves	4	1
WC	(Romania) Ilinca Amariei	6	6
(Spain) Alicia Herrero Liñana	4	6	6
7	(Bulgaria) Lia Karatantcheva	6	1	2

Qualifying competition
WC	(Romania) Ilinca Amariei	3	1
(Spain) Alicia Herrero Liñana	6	6

==== Sixth qualifier ====
First round
6	(Spain) Irene Burillo	4	6	6
(Italy) Tatiana Pieri	6	1	0
(Australia) Tina Smith	5	5
12	(Serbia) Mia Ristić	7	7

Qualifying competition
6	(Spain) Irene Burillo	5	7	7
12	(Serbia) Mia Ristić	7	5	5
