= 2025 Iași Open – Men's singles =

Men's singles
- 2025 Iași Open

Final
- Champion: (Denmark) Elmer Møller
- Runner-up: (France) Titouan Droguet
- Score: 3–6, 6–1, 7–6^{(7–2)}

Events
Singles	men	women
Doubles	men	women
- Iași Open

Hugo Dellien was the defending champion but lost in the second round to Titouan Droguet.

Elmer Møller won the title after defeating Droguet 3–6, 6–1, 7–6^{(7–2)} in the final.

== Seeds ==
1. (Bolivia) Hugo Dellien (second round)
2. (France) Hugo Gaston (first round)
3. (Spain) Carlos Taberner (second round)
4. (Denmark) Elmer Møller (champion)
5. (Brazil) Felipe Meligeni Alves (second round, retired)
6. (Switzerland) Stan Wawrinka (semifinals)
7. (France) Calvin Hemery (first round, retired)
8. (Croatia) Duje Ajduković (semifinals)

== Draw ==
Key

- Q = Qualifier
- WC = Wild card
- LL = Lucky loser
- Alt = Alternate
- ITF = ITF entry
- PR = Protected ranking
- SR = Special ranking
- SE = Special exempt
- JE = Junior exempt
- JR = Junior Accelerator Programme entrant
- CO = College Accelerator Programme entrant
- NG = Next Gen Accelerator Program entrant
- w/o = Walkover
- r = Retired
- d = Defaulted

=== Finals ===
Semifinals
(France) Titouan Droguet	6	6
8	(Croatia) Duje Ajduković	3	3
4	(Denmark) Elmer Møller	6	7^{7}
6/WC	(Switzerland) Stan Wawrinka	2	6^{4}

Final
(France) Titouan Droguet	6	1	6^{2}
4	(Denmark) Elmer Møller	3	6	7^{7}

=== Top half ===
First round
1	(Bolivia) H Dellien	6	3	6
Q	(Brazil) M Pucinelli de Almeida	3	6	4
WC	(Romania) C Crețu	1	5
(France) T Droguet	6	7
(Belgium) K Coppejans	4	4
Alt	(Brazil) JL Reis da Silva	6	6
(Paraguay) AD Vallejo	6^{10}	3
5	(Brazil) F Meligeni Alves	7^{12}	6
3	(Spain) C Taberner	4	6	6
(Lebanon) B Hassan	6	3	3
(Bolivia) M Dellien	7^{7}	6
Q	(Romania) Sebastian Gima	6^{3}	3
Q	(Germany) M Topo	2	6	4
WC	(Romania) L Preda	6	0	6
(France) H Mayot	6	6^{5}	2
8	(Croatia) D Ajduković	4	7^{7}	6

Second round
1	(Bolivia) H Dellien	6	6^{3}	3
(France) T Droguet	4	7^{7}	6
Alt	(Brazil) JL Reis da Silva	7^{7}	0
5	(Brazil) F Meligeni Alves	6^{3}	0^{r}
3	(Spain) C Taberner	2	3
(Bolivia) M Dellien	6	6
WC	(Romania) L Preda	6	5	4
8	(Croatia) D Ajduković	4	7	6

Quarterfinals
(France) T Droguet	6^{4}	6	6
Alt	(Brazil) JL Reis da Silva	7^{7}	2	1
(Bolivia) M Dellien	4	6	1
8	(Croatia) D Ajduković	6	1	6

Semifinals
(France) T Droguet	6	6
8	(Croatia) D Ajduković	3	3

=== Bottom half ===
First round
7	(France) C Hemery	1^{r}
(Romania) FC Jianu	5
(Italy) F Maestrelli	3	6	6
PR	(Spain) P Llamas Ruiz	6	1	4
(Bulgaria) D Kuzmanov	6^{4}	3
Q	(Spain) O Roca Batalla	7^{7}	6
(Spain) D Rincón	6	1	1
4	(Denmark) E Møller	4	6	6
6/WC	(Switzerland) S Wawrinka	6	6
(Lithuania) E Butvilas	4	3
Q	(Czech Republic) M Vrbenský	7^{7}	3
(Ecuador) Á Guillén Meza	6^{2}	0^{r}
Alt	(Portugal) F Ferreira Silva	5	5
Alt	(Chile) M Soto	7	7
Q	(Moldova) R Albot	1	6	7
2	(France) H Gaston	6	3	5

Second round
(Romania) FC Jianu	4	6	0
(Italy) F Maestrelli	6	3	6
Q	(Spain) O Roca Batalla	3	2
4	(Denmark) E Møller	6	6
6/WC	(Switzerland) S Wawrinka	6	6
Q	(Czech Republic) M Vrbenský	4	3
Alt	(Chile) M Soto	4	3
Q	(Moldova) R Albot	6	6

Quarterfinals
(Italy) F Maestrelli	6	2	3
4	(Denmark) E Møller	2	6	6
6/WC	(Switzerland) S Wawrinka	6	7
Q	(Moldova) R Albot	3	5

Semifinals
4	(Denmark) E Møller	6	7^{7}
6/WC	(Switzerland) S Wawrinka	2	6^{4}
