= 2024 Kiskút Open =

- Date: 11–17 March
- Edition: 2nd
- Surface: Clay (indoor)
- Location: Székesfehérvár, Hungary

Champions

Singles
- (Chinese Taipei) Tseng Chun-hsin

Doubles
- (France) Titouan Droguet / (France) Matteo Martineau
- Kiskút Open

The 2024 Kiskút Open was a professional tennis tournament played on indoor clay courts. It was the second edition of the tournament which was part of the 2024 ATP Challenger Tour. It took place in Székesfehérvár, Hungary between 11 and 17 March 2024.

== Singles main draw entrants ==
=== Seeds ===
Country	Player	Rank^{1}	Seed
AUT	Dominic Thiem	91	1
HUN	Zsombor Piros	106	2
FRA	Richard Gasquet	118	3
ESP	Pablo Llamas Ruiz	153	4
ITA	Andrea Pellegrino	157	5
AUT	Filip Misolic	164	6
FRA	Titouan Droguet	167	7
FRA	Matteo Martineau	190	8

- ^{1} Rankings are as of 4 March 2024.

=== Other entrants ===
The following players received wildcards into the singles main draw:

- (Hungary) Attila Boros
- (Hungary) Péter Fajta
- (Hungary) Mátyás Füle

The following players received entry from the qualifying draw:

- (Romania) Cezar Crețu
- (Spain) Pol Martín Tiffon
- (Austria) Gerald Melzer
- (Poland) Daniel Michalski
- (Chinese Taipei) Tseng Chun-hsin
- (Italy) Samuel Vincent Ruggeri

== Champions ==
=== Singles ===
- (Chinese Taipei) Tseng Chun-hsin def. (France) Titouan Droguet 4–1 retired.

=== Doubles ===
- (France) Titouan Droguet / (France) Matteo Martineau def. (Sweden) André Göransson / (Ukraine) Denys Molchanov 4–6, 7–5, [10–8].
