= 2025 Slovak Open =

- Date: 27 October – 2 November (men); 29 September – 5 October (women)
- Edition: 27th (men); 12th (women)
- Category: ATP Challenger Tour 125; ITF Women's World Tennis Tour
- Surface: Hard (indoor)
- Location: Bratislava, Slovakia

Champions

Men's singles
- (Belgium) Alexander Blockx

Women's singles
- Alina Korneeva

Men's doubles
- (Belgium) Sander Gillé / (Netherlands) Sem Verbeek

Women's doubles
- (Czech Republic) Lucie Havlíčková / (United Kingdom) Lily Miyazaki
- Slovak Open

The 2025 Slovak Open was a professional tennis tournament played on hard courts. It was the 27th edition of the tournament which was part of the 2025 ATP Challenger Tour and the 12th edition of the tournament which was part of the 2025 ITF Women's World Tennis Tour. It took place in Bratislava, Slovakia between 29 September and 5 October 2025 for the women and 27 October and 2 November for the men.

== Champions ==
=== Men's singles ===
- (Belgium) Alexander Blockx def. (France) Titouan Droguet 6–4, 6–3.

=== Women's singles ===
- Alina Korneeva def. (Czech Republic) Lucie Havlíčková 7–6^{(9–7)}, 7–5.

=== Men's doubles ===
- (Belgium) Sander Gillé / (Netherlands) Sem Verbeek def. (United Kingdom) Joshua Paris / (United Kingdom) Marcus Willis 7–6^{(7–3)}, 6–3.

=== Women's doubles ===
- (Czech Republic) Lucie Havlíčková / (United Kingdom) Lily Miyazaki def. (Poland) Martyna Kubka / (Czech Republic) Aneta Laboutková 3–6, 6–3, [11–9].

== Men's singles main-draw entrants ==
=== Seeds ===
Country	Player	Rank^{1}	Seed
BEL	Raphaël Collignon	73	1
CHI	Alejandro Tabilo	75	2
SRB	Laslo Djere	84	3
GER	Jan-Lennard Struff	91	4
JPN	Shintaro Mochizuki	93	5
AUT	Filip Misolic	95	6
AUS	Tristan Schoolkate	98	7
ARG	Thiago Agustín Tirante	101	8

- ^{1} Rankings are as of 20 October 2025.

=== Other entrants ===
The following players received wildcards into the singles main draw:

- (Slovakia) Norbert Gombos
- (Slovakia) Alex Molčan
- (Switzerland) Stan Wawrinka

The following players received entry into the singles main draw as alternates:

- (Tunisia) Moez Echargui
- (Estonia) Mark Lajal
- (Italy) Francesco Maestrelli

The following players received entry from the qualifying draw:

- (United Kingdom) Jan Choinski
- (France) Titouan Droguet
- (France) Sascha Gueymard Wayenburg
- (Austria) David Pichler
- (Luxembourg) Chris Rodesch
- (Ukraine) Vitaliy Sachko
