= 2026 Slovak Open – Singles =

Singles
- 2026 Slovak Open

Final
- Champion: (Austria) Jurij Rodionov
- Runner-up: (Switzerland) Jérôme Kym
- Score: 6–2, 6–1

Events
Singles	Doubles
- Slovak Open

Alexander Blockx was the defending champion but chose not to defend his title.

Jurij Rodionov won the title after defeating Jérôme Kym 6–2, 6–1 in the final.

== Seeds ==
1. (Croatia) Dino Prižmić (withdrew)
2. (United Kingdom) Toby Samuel (second round)
3. (Hungary) Zsombor Piros (quarterfinals)
4. (United States) Martin Damm (first round)
5. (Kazakhstan) Alexander Shevchenko (first round)
6. (Czech Republic) Dalibor Svrčina (semifinals)
7. (Finland) Otto Virtanen (second round)
8. (Japan) Shintaro Mochizuki (first round)
9. (United States) Nishesh Basavareddy (quarterfinals)

== Draw ==
Key

- Q = Qualifier
- WC = Wild card
- LL = Lucky loser
- Alt = Alternate
- ITF = ITF entry
- PR = Protected ranking
- SR = Special ranking
- SE = Special exempt
- JE = Junior exempt
- JR = Junior Accelerator Programme entrant
- CO = College Accelerator Programme entrant
- NG = Next Gen Accelerator Program entrant
- w/o = Walkover
- r = Retired
- d = Defaulted

=== Finals ===
Semifinals
(Switzerland) Jérôme Kym	6	6
(Croatia) Matej Dodig	4	2
6	(Czech Republic) Dalibor Svrčina	3	7^{8}	2
(Austria) Jurij Rodionov	6	6^{6}	6

Final
(Switzerland) Jérôme Kym	2	1
(Austria) Jurij Rodionov	6	6

=== Top half ===
First round
9	(United States) N Basavareddy	6	6
WC	(Slovakia) M Karol	3	3
Alt	(Switzerland) M Brunold	1	7^{7}	6
Q	(Czech Republic) M Vrbenský	6	6^{2}	1
(Switzerland) J Kym	3	6	6
Q	(France) L Poullain	6	3	2
(France) L Pavlovic	6	4	6
5	(Kazakhstan) A Shevchenko	3	6	4
4	(United States) M Damm	3	6^{10}
(Germany) T Gentzsch	6	7^{12}
(Croatia) M Dodig	6	7^{7}
Q	(Slovakia) Michal Krajčí	3	6^{2}
(Serbia) L Djere	4	7^{8}	7^{7}
(Lithuania) E Butvilas	6	6^{6}	6^{2}
(Ukraine) V Sachko	3	5
7	(Finland) O Virtanen	6	7

Second round
9	(United States) N Basavareddy	6	7
Alt	(Switzerland) M Brunold	2	5
(Switzerland) J Kym	7	6
(France) L Pavlovic	5	2
(Germany) T Gentzsch	5	4
(Croatia) M Dodig	7	6
(Serbia) L Djere	3	6	6
7	(Finland) O Virtanen	6	4	4

Quarterfinals
9	(United States) N Basavareddy	4	4
(Switzerland) J Kym	6	6
(Croatia) M Dodig	6	6
(Serbia) L Djere	4	4

Semifinals
(Switzerland) J Kym	6	6
(Croatia) M Dodig	4	2

=== Bottom half ===
First round
6	(Czech Republic) D Svrčina	4	6	6
WC	(Slovakia) N Gombos	6	1	1
Q	(France) G Mpetshi Perricard	7^{9}	6
(Czech Republic) M Krumich	6^{7}	4
Q	(Finland) E Vasa	3	4
(France) S Gueymard Wayenburg	6	6
LL	(Czech Republic) Matthew William Donald	3	3
3	(Hungary) Z Piros	6	6
8	(Japan) S Mochizuki	3	2
(Norway) N Budkov Kjær	6	6
(Belgium) K Coppejans	6	7
Q	(Czech Republic) J Forejtek	4	5
(Austria) J Rodionov	7^{7}	6
(Italy) S Travaglia	6^{2}	1
WC	(Slovakia) L Pokorný	6^{3}	6^{3}
2	(United Kingdom) T Samuel	7^{7}	7^{7}

Second round
6	(Czech Republic) D Svrčina	6	4	7^{7}
Q	(France) G Mpetshi Perricard	4	6	6^{1}
(France) S Gueymard Wayenburg	3	7^{7}	3
3	(Hungary) Z Piros	6	6^{1}	6
(Norway) N Budkov Kjær	7^{7}	6^{2}	3
(Belgium) K Coppejans	6^{3}	7^{7}	6
(Austria) J Rodionov	6	6
2	(United Kingdom) T Samuel	3	4

Quarterfinals
6	(Czech Republic) D Svrčina	4	6	6
3	(Hungary) Z Piros	6	0	4
(Belgium) K Coppejans	1	7^{7}	3
(Austria) J Rodionov	6	6^{3}	6

Semifinals
6	(Czech Republic) D Svrčina	3	7^{8}	2
(Austria) J Rodionov	6	6^{6}	6
