= 2026 Slovak Open – Doubles =

Doubles
- 2026 Slovak Open

Final
- Champions: (Slovakia) Miloš Karol (Czech Republic) Andrew Paulson
- Runners-up: (Netherlands) Jean-Julien Rojer (United States) Theodore Winegar
- Score: 7–6^{(7–3)}, 6–3

Events
Singles	Doubles
- Slovak Open

Sander Gillé and Sem Verbeek were the defending champions but lost in the quarterfinals to Jean-Julien Rojer and Theodore Winegar.

Miloš Karol and Andrew Paulson won the title after defeating Rojer and Winegar 7–6^{(7–3)}, 6–3 in the final.

== Seeds ==
1. (United Kingdom) Luke Johnson / (United States) Ryan Seggerman (quarterfinals)
2. (India) Sriram Balaji / (United States) Evan King (quarterfinals)
3. (Netherlands) Bart Stevens / (United Kingdom) Marcus Willis (first round)
4. (Belgium) Sander Gillé / (Netherlands) Sem Verbeek (quarterfinals)

== Draw ==
Key

- Q = Qualifier
- WC = Wild card
- LL = Lucky loser
- Alt = Alternate
- ITF = ITF entry
- PR = Protected ranking
- SR = Special ranking
- SE = Special exempt
- JE = Junior exempt
- JR = Junior Accelerator Programme entrant
- CO = College Accelerator Programme entrant
- NG = Next Gen Accelerator Program entrant
- w/o = Walkover
- r = Retired
- d = Defaulted

First round
1	(United Kingdom) L Johnson (United States) R Seggerman	6	6
(Uruguay) A Behar (United Kingdom) J Paris	3	4
I Liutarevich (Poland) F Pieczonka	3	7^{7}	[10]
(Croatia) A Kalender (Croatia) N Serdarušić	6	6^{4}	[5]
4	(Belgium) S Gillé (Netherlands) S Verbeek	6	6
WC	(Slovakia) Michal Krajčí (Slovakia) Tomáš Lánik	4	2
(Netherlands) J-J Rojer (United States) T Winegar	6	6
(Ecuador) G Escobar (India) N Kaliyanda Poonacha	4	3
WC	(Slovakia) A Martin (Slovakia) L Pokorný	6	7^{8}
(Spain) Í Cervantes (Spain) B Winter López	3	6^{6}
(Czech Republic) M Vocel (Czech Republic) M Vrbenský	7^{7}	4	[12]
3	(Netherlands) B Stevens (United Kingdom) M Willis	6^{4}	6	[10]
(Slovakia) M Karol (Czech Republic) A Paulson	6	6
(Mexico) S González (Germany) H Jebens	3	4
(Sweden) E Grevelius (Sweden) A Heinonen	5	6	[11]
2	(India) S Balaji (United States) E King	7	4	[13]

Quarterfinals
1	(United Kingdom) L Johnson (United States) R Seggerman	5	4
I Liutarevich (Poland) F Pieczonka	7	6
4	(Belgium) S Gillé (Netherlands) S Verbeek	3	4
(Netherlands) J-J Rojer (United States) T Winegar	6	6
WC	(Slovakia) A Martin (Slovakia) L Pokorný	4	7^{7}	[9]
(Czech Republic) M Vocel (Czech Republic) M Vrbenský	6	6^{5}	[11]
(Slovakia) M Karol (Czech Republic) A Paulson	6	6
2	(India) S Balaji (United States) E King	3	4

Semifinals
I Liutarevich (Poland) F Pieczonka	3	4
(Netherlands) J-J Rojer (United States) T Winegar	6	6
(Czech Republic) M Vocel (Czech Republic) M Vrbenský	2	5
(Slovakia) M Karol (Czech Republic) A Paulson	6	7

Final
(Netherlands) J-J Rojer (United States) T Winegar	6^{3}	3
(Slovakia) M Karol (Czech Republic) A Paulson	7^{7}	6
