= 2024 Iași Open – Women's doubles =

Women's doubles
- 2024 Iași Open

Final
- Champions: (Kazakhstan) Anna Danilina; Irina Khromacheva
- Runners-up: Alexandra Panova; Yana Sizikova
- Score: 6–4, 6–2

Events
Singles	men	women
Doubles	men	women
← 2023 ·	Iași Open	· 2025 →

Anna Danilina and Irina Khromacheva won the women's doubles title at the 2024 Iași Open, defeating Alexandra Panova and Yana Sizikova in the final, 6–4, 6–2.

Veronika Erjavec and Dalila Jakupović were the reigning champions, but Erjavec did not participate this year. Jakupović partnered Bibiane Schoofs, but lost in the first round to Mirra Andreeva and Sofya Lansere.

== Seeds ==
1. (Kazakhstan) Anna Danilina / Irina Khromacheva (champions)
2. Alexandra Panova / Yana Sizikova (final)
3. (United Kingdom) Maia Lumsden / (Czech Republic) Anna Sisková (quarterfinals)
4. (Italy) Angelica Moratelli / (United States) Sabrina Santamaria (semifinals)

== Draw ==
=== Key ===
- Q = Qualifier
- WC = Wild card
- LL = Lucky loser
- Alt = Alternate
- ITF = ITF entry
- PR = Protected ranking
- SR = Special ranking
- SE = Special exempt
- JE = Junior exempt
- JR = Junior Accelerator Programme entrant
- CO = College Accelerator Programme entrant
- NG = Next Gen Accelerator Program entrant
- w/o = Walkover
- r = Retired
- d = Defaulted

=== Draw ===
First round
1	(Kazakhstan) A Danilina; I Khromacheva	6	6
A Anshba (Czech Republic) A Dețiuc	4	3
(Slovenia) D Jakupović (Netherlands) B Schoofs	0	3
M Andreeva; S Lansere	6	6
4	(Italy) A Moratelli (United States) S Santamaria	6	6
WC	(Romania) C Dinu (Romania) A Prisăcariu	4	1
(Hungary) A Bondár (Serbia) O Danilović	7^{7}	6
(Poland) K Piter (Hungary) F Stollár	6^{4}	4
WC	(Romania) M Bulgaru (Romania) G Crăciun	5	4
(Romania) I Bara (Romania) A Todoni	7	6
(United Kingdom) A Barnett (United Kingdom) F Christie	0	3
3	(United Kingdom) M Lumsden (Czech Republic) A Sisková	6	6
(Spain) Y Cavallé Reimers (Italy) A Zantedeschi	7^{7}	7^{7}
A Tikhonova; M Timofeeva	6^{3}	6^{4}
(Argentina) ML Carlé (Greece) E Christofi	5	0
2	A Panova; Y Sizikova	7	6

Quarterfinals
1	(Kazakhstan) A Danilina; I Khromacheva	3	6	[10]
M Andreeva; S Lansere	6	2	[7]
4	(Italy) A Moratelli (United States) S Santamaria	6	6
(Hungary) A Bondár (Serbia) O Danilović	4	3
(Romania) I Bara (Romania) A Todoni	6	6
3	(United Kingdom) M Lumsden (Czech Republic) A Sisková	2	0
(Spain) Y Cavallé Reimers (Italy) A Zantedeschi	1	0
2	A Panova; Y Sizikova	6	6

Semifinals
1	(Kazakhstan) A Danilina; I Khromacheva	6	6
4	(Italy) A Moratelli (United States) S Santamaria	2	4
(Romania) I Bara (Romania) A Todoni	4	4
2	A Panova; Y Sizikova	6	6

Final
1	(Kazakhstan) A Danilina; I Khromacheva	6	6
2	A Panova; Y Sizikova	4	2
