= 2025 Slovak Open – Men's doubles =

Men's doubles
- 2025 Slovak Open

Final
- Champions: (Belgium) Sander Gillé (Netherlands) Sem Verbeek
- Runners-up: (United Kingdom) Joshua Paris (United Kingdom) Marcus Willis
- Score: 7–6^{(7–3)}, 6–3

Events
Singles	men	women
Doubles	men	women
- Slovak Open

Nicolás Barrientos and Julian Cash were the defending champions but only Barrientos chose to defend his title, partnering Jackson Withrow. They lost in the semifinals to Joshua Paris and Marcus Willis.

Sander Gillé and Sem Verbeek won the title after defeating Paris and Willis 7–6^{(7–3)}, 6–3 in the final.

== Seeds ==
1. (Belgium) Sander Gillé / (Netherlands) Sem Verbeek (champions)
2. (Germany) Jakob Schnaitter / (Germany) Mark Wallner (first round)
3. (Germany) Constantin Frantzen / (Netherlands) Robin Haase (quarterfinals)
4. (United States) Vasil Kirkov / (Netherlands) Bart Stevens (quarterfinals)

== Draw ==
Key

- Q = Qualifier
- WC = Wild card
- LL = Lucky loser
- Alt = Alternate
- ITF = ITF entry
- PR = Protected ranking
- SR = Special ranking
- SE = Special exempt
- JE = Junior exempt
- JR = Junior Accelerator Programme entrant
- CO = College Accelerator Programme entrant
- NG = Next Gen Accelerator Program entrant
- w/o = Walkover
- r = Retired
- d = Defaulted

=== Draw ===
First round
1	(Belgium) S Gillé (Netherlands) S Verbeek	6	6
(Ukraine) D Molchanov (Austria) D Pichler	4	3
Alt	(Slovakia) Tomáš Lánik (Slovakia) L Pokorný	3	6	[13]
(Uruguay) A Behar (Belgium) J Vliegen	6	3	[15]
4	(United States) V Kirkov (Netherlands) B Stevens	7	6
(India) S Balaji (Germany) H Jebens	5	4
WC	(Slovakia) M Karol (Ukraine) V Sachko	5	6	[4]
(Czech Republic) P Nouza (Czech Republic) P Rikl	7	4	[10]
(Romania) V Cornea (India) VS Prashanth	6^{7}	6^{3}
(United Kingdom) J Paris (United Kingdom) M Willis	7^{9}	7^{7}
(United States) T Hilderbrand (United States) R Seggerman	6^{9}	3
3	(Germany) C Frantzen (Netherlands) R Haase	7^{11}	6
(Switzerland) J Paul (Czech Republic) M Vocel	6	6
WC	(Slovakia) Michal Krajčí (Slovakia) Radovan Michalik	2	1
(Colombia) N Barrientos (United States) J Withrow	7^{7}	6^{5}	[10]
2	(Germany) J Schnaitter (Germany) M Wallner	6^{2}	7^{7}	[5]

Quarterfinals
1	(Belgium) S Gillé (Netherlands) S Verbeek	6	6^{6}	[11]
(Uruguay) A Behar (Belgium) J Vliegen	4	7^{8}	[9]
4	(United States) V Kirkov (Netherlands) B Stevens	3	5
(Czech Republic) P Nouza (Czech Republic) P Rikl	6	7
(United Kingdom) J Paris (United Kingdom) M Willis	6	3	[10]
3	(Germany) C Frantzen (Netherlands) R Haase	4	6	[6]
(Switzerland) J Paul (Czech Republic) M Vocel	6^{5}	6	[7]
(Colombia) N Barrientos (United States) J Withrow	7^{7}	1	[10]

Semifinals
1	(Belgium) S Gillé (Netherlands) S Verbeek	7^{8}	6
(Czech Republic) P Nouza (Czech Republic) P Rikl	6^{6}	3
(United Kingdom) J Paris (United Kingdom) M Willis	6	6
(Colombia) N Barrientos (United States) J Withrow	4	4

Final
1	(Belgium) S Gillé (Netherlands) S Verbeek	7^{7}	6
(United Kingdom) J Paris (United Kingdom) M Willis	6^{3}	3
