= 2023 Dutch Open – Singles =

Singles
- 2023 Dutch Open

Final
- Champion: (Germany) Maximilian Marterer
- Runner-up: (France) Titouan Droguet
- Score: 6–4, 6–2

Events
Singles	Doubles
- Dutch Open

Tallon Griekspoor was the defending champion but chose not to defend his title.

Maximilian Marterer won the title after defeating Titouan Droguet 6–4, 6–2 in the final.

== Seeds ==
1. (Argentina) Facundo Díaz Acosta (quarterfinals, retired)
2. (Brazil) Felipe Meligeni Alves (first round)
3. (United Kingdom) Jan Choinski (second round)
4. (Netherlands) Jelle Sels (first round)
5. (Germany) Maximilian Marterer (champion)
6. (Netherlands) Jesper de Jong (first round)
7. (Romania) Nicholas David Ionel (second round)
8. (France) Titouan Droguet (final)

== Draw ==
Key

- Q = Qualifier
- WC = Wild card
- LL = Lucky loser
- Alt = Alternate
- ITF = ITF entry
- PR = Protected ranking
- SR = Special ranking
- SE = Special exempt
- JE = Junior exempt
- JR = Junior Accelerator Programme entrant
- CO = College Accelerator Programme entrant
- NG = Next Gen Accelerator Program entrant
- w/o = Walkover
- r = Retired
- d = Defaulted

=== Finals ===
Semifinals
Q	(France) Mathys Erhard	5	1
8	(France) Titouan Droguet	7	6
(Germany) Rudolf Molleker	4	6^{5}
5	(Germany) Maximilian Marterer	6	7^{7}

Final
8	(France) Titouan Droguet	4	2
5	(Germany) Maximilian Marterer	6	6

=== Top half ===
First round
1	(Argentina) F Díaz Acosta	6	6
(France) U Blanchet	1	2
(Italy) S Travaglia	6	6
LL	(Italy) Luca Potenza	2	3
Q	(Belgium) T Colson	6^{6}	6^{3}
Q	(France) Mathys Erhard	7^{8}	7^{7}
(Netherlands) M Houkes	6^{4}	2
7	(Romania) ND Ionel	7^{7}	6
3	(United Kingdom) J Choinski	6	7
(Argentina) S Rodríguez Taverna	4	5
(Spain) M Landaluce	6^{4}	5
WC	(Netherlands) Alec Deckers	7^{7}	7
Q	(Netherlands) N Visker	2	1
Q	(Denmark) E Møller	6	6
Q	(Czech Republic) M Vrbenský	1	4
8	(France) T Droguet	6	6

Second round
1	(Argentina) F Díaz Acosta	6	4	6
(Italy) S Travaglia	3	6	4
Q	(France) M Erhard	6	6
7	(Romania) ND Ionel	2	3
3	(United Kingdom) J Choinski	2	6^{5}
WC	(Netherlands) A Deckers	6	7^{7}
Q	(Denmark) E Møller	3	4
8	(France) T Droguet	6	6

Quarterfinals
1	(Argentina) F Díaz Acosta	3	0^{r}
Q	(France) M Erhard	6	0
WC	(Netherlands) A Deckers	3	6	3
8	(France) T Droguet	6	4	6

Semifinals
Q	(France) M Erhard	5	1
8	(France) T Droguet	7	6

=== Bottom half ===
First round
6	(Netherlands) J de Jong	4	6	3
WC	(Netherlands) G den Ouden	6	3	6
(Belgium) G Onclin	6	6
(Spain) O Roca Batalla	2	2
(Germany) R Molleker	6	7^{7}
WC	(Netherlands) Sander Jong	4	6^{3}
(Argentina) F Delbonis	7^{7}	6
4	(Netherlands) J Sels	6^{2}	2
5	(Germany) M Marterer	6	6
(Canada) S Diez	3	4
Alt	(France) M Guinard	2	2
(Czech Republic) J Menšík	6	6
Q	(Belgium) J De Loore	6	6
LL	(Spain) Àlex Martí Pujolràs	3	3
(Belgium) M Geerts	3	6	6
2	(Brazil) F Meligeni Alves	6	2	2

Second round
WC	(Netherlands) G den Ouden	6^{6}	6^{6}
(Belgium) G Onclin	7^{8}	7^{8}
(Germany) R Molleker	6	6
(Argentina) F Delbonis	1	3
5	(Germany) M Marterer	6	7^{7}
(Czech Republic) J Menšík	3	6^{3}
Q	(Belgium) J De Loore	6^{2}	7^{7}	4
(Belgium) M Geerts	7^{7}	6^{4}	6

Quarterfinals
(Belgium) G Onclin	2	2
(Germany) R Molleker	6	6
5	(Germany) M Marterer	6	6
(Belgium) M Geerts	1	2

Semifinals
(Germany) R Molleker	4	6^{5}
5	(Germany) M Marterer	6	7^{7}
