= 2023 Dutch Open – Doubles =

Doubles
- 2023 Dutch Open

Final
- Champions: (France) Manuel Guinard (France) Grégoire Jacq
- Runners-up: (Netherlands) Mats Hermans (Netherlands) Sander Jong
- Score: 6–4, 6–4

Events
Singles	Doubles
- Dutch Open

Robin Haase and Sem Verbeek were the defending champions but chose not to defend their title.

Manuel Guinard and Grégoire Jacq won the title after defeating Mats Hermans and Sander Jong 6–4, 6–4 in the final.

== Seeds ==
1. (France) Manuel Guinard / (France) Grégoire Jacq (champions)
2. (Switzerland) Luca Margaroli / (Germany) Tim Sandkaulen (quarterfinals)
3. (United Kingdom) Joshua Paris / (United Kingdom) Marcus Willis (first round)
4. (Argentina) Santiago Rodríguez Taverna / (Ukraine) Volodymyr Uzhylovskyi (quarterfinals)

== Draw ==
Key

- Q = Qualifier
- WC = Wild card
- LL = Lucky loser
- Alt = Alternate
- ITF = ITF entry
- PR = Protected ranking
- SR = Special ranking
- SE = Special exempt
- JE = Junior exempt
- JR = Junior Accelerator Programme entrant
- CO = College Accelerator Programme entrant
- NG = Next Gen Accelerator Program entrant
- w/o = Walkover
- r = Retired
- d = Defaulted

First round
(France) M Westphal (United States) T Winegar	3	7^{7}	[8]
(Netherlands) G den Ouden (Netherlands) Fons van Sambeek	6	6^{5}	[10]
4	(Argentina) S Rodríguez Taverna (Ukraine) V Uzhylovskyi	2	6	[13]
(Spain) Í Cervantes (Netherlands) M Vervoort	6	4	[11]
WC	(Netherlands) Elgin Khoeblal (Netherlands) Daniël Verbeek	6^{7}	6	[11]
(Italy) Luca Potenza (Italy) Augusto Virgili	7^{9}	4	[9]
(Belgium) J De Loore (Belgium) M Geerts
(Brazil) D Dutra da Silva (Brazil) M Pucinelli de Almeida	w/o
Alt	(Brazil) F Meligeni Alves (Brazil) E Ribeiro	7^{9}	7
3	(United Kingdom) J Paris (United Kingdom) M Willis	6^{7}	5
(Brazil) J Pereira (Brazil) P Sakamoto	6^{4}	3
(Netherlands) M Hermans (Netherlands) Sander Jong	7^{7}	6

Quarterfinals
1	(France) M Guinard (France) G Jacq	6	6
(Netherlands) G den Ouden (Netherlands) F van Sambeek	2	1
4	(Argentina) S Rodríguez Taverna (Ukraine) V Uzhylovskyi	6^{4}	4
WC	(Netherlands) E Khoeblal (Netherlands) D Verbeek	7^{7}	6
(Brazil) D Dutra da Silva (Brazil) M Pucinelli de Almeida	3	3
Alt	(Brazil) F Meligeni Alves (Brazil) E Ribeiro	6	6
(Netherlands) M Hermans (Netherlands) S Jong	6	1	[10]
2/WC	(Switzerland) L Margaroli (Germany) T Sandkaulen	3	6	[7]

Semifinals
1	(France) M Guinard (France) G Jacq	5	6	[10]
WC	(Netherlands) E Khoeblal (Netherlands) D Verbeek	7	2	[6]
Alt	(Brazil) F Meligeni Alves (Brazil) E Ribeiro	6^{4}	2
(Netherlands) M Hermans (Netherlands) S Jong	7^{7}	6

Final
1	(France) M Guinard (France) G Jacq	6	6
(Netherlands) M Hermans (Netherlands) S Jong	4	4
