= 2024 Kiskút Open – Doubles =

Doubles
- 2024 Kiskút Open

Final
- Champions: (France) Titouan Droguet (France) Matteo Martineau
- Runners-up: (Sweden) André Göransson (Ukraine) Denys Molchanov
- Score: 4–6, 7–5, [10–8]

Events
| Singles | Doubles |
- Kiskút Open

Bogdan Bobrov and Sergey Fomin were the defending champions but chose not to defend their title.

Titouan Droguet and Matteo Martineau won the title after defeating André Göransson and Denys Molchanov 4–6, 7–5, [10–8] in the final.

== Seeds ==
1. (Sweden) André Göransson / (Ukraine) Denys Molchanov (final)
2. (France) Théo Arribagé / (Romania) Victor Vlad Cornea (semifinals)
3. (Netherlands) Bart Stevens / (Greece) Petros Tsitsipas (first round)
4. (France) Jonathan Eysseric / (Italy) Andrea Pellegrino (quarterfinals)

== Draw ==
Key

- Q = Qualifier
- WC = Wild card
- LL = Lucky loser
- Alt = Alternate
- ITF = ITF entry
- PR = Protected ranking
- SR = Special ranking
- SE = Special exempt
- JE = Junior exempt
- JR = Junior Accelerator Programme entrant
- CO = College Accelerator Programme entrant
- NG = Next Gen Accelerator Program entrant
- w/o = Walkover
- r = Retired
- d = Defaulted

First round
1 | (Sweden) A Göransson (Ukraine) D Molchanov | 4 | 7^{7} | [10]
(France) M Guinard (France) G Jacq | 6 | 6^{2} | [8]
Alt | (Romania) C Crețu (Romania) A Jecan | 6 | 7^{7}
(Croatia) N Serdarušić (Czech Republic) M Vrbenský | 1 | 6^{3}
3 | (Netherlands) B Stevens (Greece) Pe Tsitsipas | 3 | 6^{5}
Alt | (Italy) F Agamenone (Argentina) S Rodríguez Taverna | 6 | 7^{7}
WC | (Hungary) Attila Boros (Hungary) Botond Kistantal | 4 | 4
(India) RC Bollipalli (India) N Kaliyanda Poonacha | 6 | 6
(Slovakia) J Kovalík (Slovakia) I Zelenay | 7^{9} | 5 | [9]
(France) T Droguet (France) M Martineau | 6^{7} | 7 | [11]
WC | (Hungary) Mátyás Füle (Hungary) G Madarász | 6 | 3 | [7]
4 | (France) J Eysseric (Italy) A Pellegrino | 3 | 6 | [10]
(Czech Republic) P Nouza (Czech Republic) P Rikl | 7^{7} | 7
(Czech Republic) Z Kolář (Ukraine) V Manafov | 6^{3} | 5
(Serbia) I Sabanov (Serbia) M Sabanov | 2 | 6^{3}
2 | (France) T Arribagé (Romania) VV Cornea | 6 | 7^{7}

Quarterfinals
1 | (Sweden) A Göransson (Ukraine) D Molchanov | 7 | 6
Alt | (Romania) C Crețu (Romania) A Jecan | 5 | 2
Alt | (Italy) F Agamenone (Argentina) S Rodríguez Taverna | 7^{7} | 2 | [10]
(India) RC Bollipalli (India) N Kaliyanda Poonacha | 6^{5} | 6 | [8]
(France) T Droguet (France) M Martineau | 4 | 6 | [12]
4 | (France) J Eysseric (Italy) A Pellegrino | 6 | 0 | [10]
(Czech Republic) P Nouza (Czech Republic) P Rikl | 7^{7} | 5 | [8]
2 | (France) T Arribagé (Romania) VV Cornea | 6^{3} | 7 | [10]

Semifinals
1 | (Sweden) A Göransson (Ukraine) D Molchanov | 7 | 6
Alt | (Italy) F Agamenone (Argentina) S Rodríguez Taverna | 5 | 2
(France) T Droguet (France) M Martineau | 3 | 6 | [10]
2 | (France) T Arribagé (Romania) VV Cornea | 6 | 3 | [8]

Final
1 | (Sweden) A Göransson (Ukraine) D Molchanov | 6 | 5 | [8]
(France) T Droguet (France) M Martineau | 4 | 7 | [10]
