= 2022 Internationaux de Tennis de Toulouse =

- Date: 29 August – 4 September
- Edition: 1st
- Surface: Clay
- Location: Toulouse, France

Champions

Singles
- (Belgium) Kimmer Coppejans

Doubles
- (France) Maxime Janvier / (Tunisia) Malek Jaziri
- Internationaux de Tennis de Toulouse

The 2022 Internationaux de Tennis de Toulouse was a professional tennis tournament played on clay courts. It was the first edition of the tournament which was part of the 2022 ATP Challenger Tour. It took place in Toulouse, France between 29 August and 4 September 2022.

== Singles main-draw entrants ==
=== Seeds ===
Country	Player	Rank^{1}	Seed
ESP	Carlos Taberner	118	1
SWE	Elias Ymer	135	2
FRA	Alexandre Müller	144	3
ITA	Gianluca Mager	165	4
ARG	Marco Trungelliti	180	5
ARG	Facundo Díaz Acosta	228	6
HUN	Fábián Marozsán	239	7
ESP	Pol Martín Tiffon	242	8

- ^{1} Rankings are as of 22 August 2022.

=== Other entrants ===
The following players received wildcards into the singles main draw:

- (France) Titouan Droguet
- (France) Mathys Erhard
- (France) Arthur Reymond

The following players received entry into the singles main draw as alternates:

- (Portugal) João Domingues
- Ivan Gakhov
- (Lebanon) Benjamin Hassan

The following players received entry from the qualifying draw:

- (France) Ugo Blanchet
- (France) Jurgen Briand
- Andrey Chepelev
- (Belgium) Kimmer Coppejans
- (Poland) Karol Drzewiecki
- (France) Arthur Fils

The following player received entry as a lucky loser:

- (Argentina) Román Andrés Burruchaga

== Champions ==
=== Singles ===
- (Belgium) Kimmer Coppejans def. (France) Maxime Janvier 6–7^{(8–10)}, 6–4, 6–3.

=== Doubles ===
- (France) Maxime Janvier / (Tunisia) Malek Jaziri def. (France) Théo Arribagé / (France) Titouan Droguet 6–3, 7–6^{(7–5)}.
