= 2024 Iași Open – Women's singles =

Women's singles
- 2024 Iași Open

Final
- Champion: Mirra Andreeva
- Runner-up: Elina Avanesyan
- Score: 5–7, 7–5, 4–0 ret.

Events
Singles	men	women
Doubles	men	women
← 2023 ·	Iași Open	· 2025 →

Mirra Andreeva won the tournament to claim her first WTA Tour title, defeating Elina Avanesyan in the final, 5–7, 7–5, 4–0 ret. At 17 years and 3 months, Andreeva became the youngest player to win her first WTA tour level title since Coco Gauff in 2019.

Ana Bogdan was the two-time defending champion, but withdrew before the tournament began.

== Seeds ==
1. Mirra Andreeva (champion)
2. (Germany) Tatjana Maria (first round)
3. (Romania) Jaqueline Cristian (quarterfinals)
4. Anna Blinkova (first round)
5. Elina Avanesyan (final, retired)
6. (Italy) Martina Trevisan (first round)
7. (Argentina) María Lourdes Carlé (first round)
8. (Hungary) Anna Bondár (quarterfinals)

Aliaksandra Sasnovich received a performance bye for reaching the final in Budapest.

== Draw ==
=== Key ===
- Q = Qualifier
- WC = Wild card
- LL = Lucky loser
- Alt = Alternate
- ITF = ITF entry
- PR = Protected ranking
- SR = Special ranking
- SE = Special exempt
- JE = Junior exempt
- JR = Junior Accelerator Programme entrant
- CO = College Accelerator Programme entrant
- NG = Next Gen Accelerator Program entrant
- w/o = Walkover
- r = Retired
- d = Defaulted

=== Finals ===
Semifinals
1	Mirra Andreeva	3	6	7^{7}
(Serbia) Olga Danilović	6	3	6^{1}
5	Elina Avanesyan	6	6
(France) Chloé Paquet	2	3

Final
1	Mirra Andreeva	5	7	4
5	Elina Avanesyan	7	5	0^{r}

=== Top half ===
First round
1	M Andreeva	6	6
(Germany) N Noha Akugue	1	2
LL	(Croatia) L Bošković	7	6
M Timofeeva	5	1
Q	(United States) V Lepchenko	5	6	6
6	(Italy) M Trevisan	7	4	3
4	A Blinkova	2	7	1
(Serbia) O Danilović	6	5	6
Q	A Falei	0^{r}
(Romania) A Todoni	5
(Spain) M Bassols Ribera	6	6
WC	(Romania) I Bara	2	3
Q	(Belgium) M Benoît	3	1
8	(Hungary) A Bondár	6	6

Second round
1	M Andreeva	6	6
A Sasnovich	1	3
LL	(Croatia) L Bošković	6	6
Q	(United States) V Lepchenko	3	4
(Serbia) O Danilović	6	6
(Romania) A Todoni	1	1
(Spain) M Bassols Ribera	5	4
8	(Hungary) A Bondár	7	6

Quarterfinals
1	M Andreeva	6	6
LL	(Croatia) L Bošković	2	0
(Serbia) O Danilović	7	6
8	(Hungary) A Bondár	5	2

Semifinals
1	M Andreeva	3	6	7^{7}
(Serbia) O Danilović	6	3	6^{1}

=== Bottom half ===
First round
5	E Avanesyan	6	6
(Spain) L Romero Gormaz	1	2
(Spain) N Párrizas Díaz	4	4
(Croatia) P Martić	6	6
WC	(Romania) E-G Ruse	6	5	6
A Tikhonova	3	7	1
LL	(Italy) N Brancaccio	2	4
3	(Romania) J Cristian	6	6
7	(Argentina) ML Carlé	4	2
(France) C Paquet	6	6
Q	(Switzerland) S Waltert	6	6
E Makarova	2	2
Q	(Bulgaria) G Topalova	1	2
Q	(France) S Janicijevic	6	6
WC	(Romania) M Bulgaru	6	6
2	(Germany) T Maria	4	2

Second round
5	E Avanesyan	6	5	6
(Croatia) P Martić	2	7	4
WC	(Romania) E-G Ruse	4	7^{7}	2
3	(Romania) J Cristian	6	6^{1}	6
(France) C Paquet	6	7
Q	(Switzerland) S Waltert	1	5
Q	(France) S Janicijevic	6	7^{8}
WC	(Romania) M Bulgaru	2	6^{6}

Quarterfinals
5	E Avanesyan	7	6
3	(Romania) J Cristian	5	4
(France) C Paquet	0	6	6
Q	(France) S Janicijevic	6	2	1

Semifinals
5	E Avanesyan	6	6
(France) C Paquet	2	3

== Qualifying ==
=== Seeds ===
1. (Croatia) Lea Bošković (qualifying competition, lucky loser)
2. Aliona Falei (qualified)
3. (United States) Varvara Lepchenko (qualified)
4. (France) Séléna Janicijevic (qualified)
5. Anastasia Tikhonova (moved to main draw)
6. (Slovenia) Dalila Jakupović (first round)
7. Julia Avdeeva (qualifying competition)
8. (China) You Xiaodi (first round)
9. (Belgium) Marie Benoît (qualified)
10. (Italy) Nuria Brancaccio (qualifying competition, lucky loser)
11. (Bulgaria) Gergana Topalova (qualified)
12. Sofya Lansere (qualifying competition)

=== Qualifiers ===
1. (Bulgaria) Gergana Topalova
2. Aliona Falei
3. (United States) Varvara Lepchenko
4. (France) Séléna Janicijevic
5. (Belgium) Marie Benoît
6. (Switzerland) Simona Waltert

=== Lucky losers ===
1. (Croatia) Lea Bošković
2. (Italy) Nuria Brancaccio

=== Qualifying draw ===
==== First qualifier ====
First round
1	(Croatia) Lea Bošković	6	5
WC	(Romania) Irina Fetecău	1	0^{r}
WC	(Hungary) Natália Szabanin	6^{6}	6	3
11	(Bulgaria) Gergana Topalova	7^{8}	1	6

Qualifying competition
1	(Croatia) Lea Bošković	6	3	4
11	(Bulgaria) Gergana Topalova	2	6	6

==== Second qualifier ====
First round
2	Aliona Falei	3	6	6
(Serbia) Lola Radivojević	6	3	4
(Romania) Cristina Dinu	6	3	5
12	Sofya Lansere	1	6	7

Qualifying competition
2	Aliona Falei	6	6
12	Sofya Lansere	4	2

==== Third qualifier ====
First round
3	(United States) Varvara Lepchenko	6	6
(Romania) Ilinca Amariei	3	2
(Australia) Seone Mendez	1	6	2
10	(Italy) Nuria Brancaccio	6	3	6

Qualifying competition
3	(United States) Varvara Lepchenko	6	6
10	(Italy) Nuria Brancaccio	3	4

==== Fourth qualifier ====
First round
4	(France) Séléna Janicijevic	6	6
(Spain) Irene Burillo Escorihuela	2	3
WC	(Romania) Andreea Prisăcariu	4	7^{7}	3
7	Julia Avdeeva	6	6^{5}	6

Qualifying competition
4	(France) Séléna Janicijevic	4	6	6
7	Julia Avdeeva	6	0	2

==== Fifth qualifier ====
First round
Alt	(Czech Republic) Anna Sisková	5	6	6^{2}
(Romania) Gabriela Lee	7	4	7^{7}
WC	(Romania) Georgia Crăciun	1	7^{7}	0
9	(Belgium) Marie Benoît	6	6^{4}	6

Qualifying competition
(Romania) Gabriela Lee	3	4
9	(Belgium) Marie Benoît	6	6

==== Sixth qualifier ====
First round
6	(Slovenia) Dalila Jakupović	4	1
(Switzerland) Simona Waltert	6	6
(Romania) Maria Sara Popa	6	6
8	(China) You Xiaodi	3	2

Qualifying competition
(Switzerland) Simona Waltert	6	6
(Romania) Maria Sara Popa	0	4
