= 2024 Kiskút Open – Singles =

Singles
- 2024 Kiskút Open

Final
- Champion: (Chinese Taipei) Tseng Chun-hsin
- Runner-up: (France) Titouan Droguet
- Score: 4–1 ret.

Events
| Singles | Doubles |
- Kiskút Open

Hamad Medjedovic was the defending champion but chose not to defend his title.

Tseng Chun-hsin won the title after Titouan Droguet retired trailing 1–4 in the final.

== Seeds ==
1. (Austria) Dominic Thiem (first round)
2. (Hungary) Zsombor Piros (quarterfinals)
3. (France) Richard Gasquet (first round)
4. (Spain) Pablo Llamas Ruiz (first round)
5. (Italy) Andrea Pellegrino (second round)
6. (Austria) Filip Misolic (first round)
7. (France) Titouan Droguet (final, retired)
8. (France) Matteo Martineau (quarterfinals)

== Draw ==
Key

- Q = Qualifier
- WC = Wild card
- LL = Lucky loser
- Alt = Alternate
- ITF = ITF entry
- PR = Protected ranking
- SR = Special ranking
- SE = Special exempt
- JE = Junior exempt
- JR = Junior Accelerator Programme entrant
- CO = College Accelerator Programme entrant
- NG = Next Gen Accelerator Program entrant
- w/o = Walkover
- r = Retired
- d = Defaulted

=== Finals ===
Semifinals
(Italy) Francesco Maestrelli | 6 | 4 | 4
Q | (Chinese Taipei) Tseng Chun-hsin | 3 | 6 | 6
(Italy) Franco Agamenone | 2 | 2
7 | (France) Titouan Droguet | 6 | 6

Final
Q | (Chinese Taipei) Tseng Chun-hsin | 4
7 | (France) Titouan Droguet | 1^{r}

=== Top half ===
First round
1 | (Austria) D Thiem | 3 | 4
Q | (Poland) D Michalski | 6 | 6
Q | (Romania) C Crețu | 6 | 6
Q | (Spain) P Martín Tiffon | 2 | 1
(Italy) F Maestrelli | 7 | 6
WC | (Hungary) Attila Boros | 5 | 1
(Kazakhstan) T Skatov | 7^{7} | 2 | 4
5 | (Italy) A Pellegrino | 6^{2} | 6 | 6
3 | (France) R Gasquet | 4 | 2
Q | (Chinese Taipei) C-h Tseng | 6 | 6
(Austria) L Neumayer | 6 | 4 | 3
Q | (Italy) Samuel Vincent Ruggeri | 1 | 6 | 6
(Italy) A Giannessi | 6 | 1 | 6
(France) M Bourgue | 4 | 6 | 4
(Hungary) M Valkusz | 6 | 1 | 1
8 | (France) M Martineau | 4 | 6 | 6

Second round
Q | (Poland) D Michalski | 6 | 6
Q | (Romania) C Crețu | 3 | 1
(Italy) F Maestrelli | 6 | 6
5 | (Italy) A Pellegrino | 1 | 4
Q | (Chinese Taipei) C-h Tseng | 2 | 6 | 6
Q | (Italy) S Vincent Ruggeri | 6 | 2 | 3
(Italy) A Giannessi | 4 | 6^{2}
8 | (France) M Martineau | 6 | 7^{7}

Quarterfinals
Q | (Poland) D Michalski | 2 | 3
(Italy) F Maestrelli | 6 | 6
Q | (Chinese Taipei) C-h Tseng | 6 | 4 | 6
8 | (France) M Martineau | 4 | 6 | 4

Semifinals
(Italy) F Maestrelli | 6 | 4 | 4
Q | (Chinese Taipei) C-h Tseng | 3 | 6 | 6

=== Bottom half ===
First round
6 | (Austria) F Misolic | 6 | 3 | 4
(Czech Republic) Z Kolář | 4 | 6 | 6
WC | (Hungary) Mátyás Füle | 3 | 0
(France) M Guinard | 6 | 6
(Jordan) A Shelbayh | 6^{2} | 0
(Italy) F Agamenone | 7^{7} | 6
(Bosnia and Herzegovina) N Fatić | 6 | 6^{5} | 6
4 | (Spain) P Llamas Ruiz | 4 | 7^{7} | 0
7 | (France) T Droguet | 6 | 6
(Italy) E Dalla Valle | 0 | 3
WC | (Hungary) Péter Fajta | 2 | 3
(Slovakia) J Kovalík | 6 | 6
Q | (Austria) G Melzer | 3 | 6 | 6^{5}
(Argentina) S Rodríguez Taverna | 6 | 4 | 7^{7}
(Italy) G Fonio | 3 | 2
2 | (Hungary) Z Piros | 6 | 6

Second round
(Czech Republic) Z Kolář | 6 | 7
(France) M Guinard | 3 | 5
(Italy) F Agamenone | 4 | 6 | 6
(Bosnia and Herzegovina) N Fatić | 6 | 3 | 0
7 | (France) T Droguet | 6 | 7^{7}
(Slovakia) J Kovalík | 4 | 6^{5}
(Argentina) S Rodríguez Taverna | 5 | 6 | 3
2 | (Hungary) Z Piros | 7 | 2 | 6

Quarterfinals
(Czech Republic) Z Kolář | 6 | 6^{1} | 3
(Italy) F Agamenone | 4 | 7^{7} | 6
7 | (France) T Droguet | 4 | 6 | 6
2 | (Hungary) Z Piros | 6 | 1 | 4

Semifinals
(Italy) F Agamenone | 2 | 2
7 | (France) T Droguet | 6 | 6
