= 2023 Dutch Open =

- Date: 17 – 23 July
- Surface: Clay / outdoor
- Location: Amersfoort, Netherlands

Champions

Singles
- (Germany) Maximilian Marterer

Doubles
- (France) Manuel Guinard / (France) Grégoire Jacq
- Dutch Open

The 2023 Dutch Open, also known by its sponsored name Van Mossel Kia Dutch Open, was a professional tennis tournament played on clay courts. It was the fourth edition of the Challenger tournament which was part of the 2023 ATP Challenger Tour. It took place in Amersfoort, Netherlands between 17 and 23 July 2023.

== Singles main draw entrants ==
=== Seeds ===
Country	Player	Rank^{1}	Seed
ARG	Facundo Díaz Acosta	115	1
BRA	Felipe Meligeni Alves	134	2
GBR	Jan Choinski	164	3
NED	Jelle Sels	167	4
GER	Maximilian Marterer	170	5
NED	Jesper de Jong	177	6
ROU	Nicholas David Ionel	192	7
FRA	Titouan Droguet	205	8

- ^{1} Rankings are as of 3 July 2023.

=== Other entrants ===
The following players received wildcards into the singles main draw:

- (Netherlands) Alec Deckers
- (Netherlands) Guy den Ouden
- (Netherlands) Sander Jong

The following player received entry into the singles main draw as an alternate:

- (France) Manuel Guinard

The following players received entry from the qualifying draw:

- (Belgium) Tibo Colson
- (Belgium) Joris De Loore
- (France) Mathys Erhard
- (Denmark) Elmer Møller
- (Netherlands) Niels Visker
- (Czech Republic) Michael Vrbenský

The following players received entry as lucky losers:

- (Spain) Àlex Martí Pujolràs
- (Italy) Luca Potenza

== Champions ==
=== Singles ===
- (Germany) Maximilian Marterer def. (France) Titouan Droguet 6–4, 6–2.

=== Doubles ===
- (France) Manuel Guinard / (France) Grégoire Jacq def. (Netherlands) Mats Hermans / (Netherlands) Sander Jong 6–4, 6–4.
