= Internationaux de Tennis de Toulouse =

- 2022 Internationaux de Tennis de Toulouse

ATP Challenger Tour
- Location: Toulouse, France
- Category: ATP Challenger Tour
- Surface: Clay

The Internationaux de Tennis de Toulouse is a professional tennis tournament played on clay courts. It is currently part of the Association of Tennis Professionals (ATP) Challenger Tour. It has been held in Toulouse, France since 2022.

== Past finals ==
=== Singles ===
Year	Champion	Runner-up	Score
2022	(Belgium) Kimmer Coppejans	(France) Maxime Janvier	6–7^{(8–10)}, 6–4, 6–3

=== Doubles ===
Year	Champions	Runners-up	Score
2022	(France) Maxime Janvier (Tunisia) Malek Jaziri	(France) Théo Arribagé (France) Titouan Droguet	6–3, 7–6^{(7–5)}
