= 2026 Slovak Open =

- Date: 2 – 8 November
- Edition: 28th
- Category: ATP Challenger Tour
- Surface: Hard (indoor)
- Location: Bratislava, Slovakia

Champions

Singles
- (Austria) Jurij Rodionov

Doubles
- (Slovakia) Miloš Karol / (Czech Republic) Andrew Paulson
- Slovak Open

The 2026 J&T Banka Slovak Open was a professional tennis tournament played on hard courts. It was the 28th edition of the tournament which was part of the 2026 ATP Challenger Tour. It took place in Bratislava, Slovakia between 2 and 8 November 2026.

== Champions ==
=== Singles ===
- (Austria) Jurij Rodionov def. (Switzerland) Jérôme Kym 6–2, 6–1.

=== Doubles ===
- (Slovakia) Miloš Karol / (Czech Republic) Andrew Paulson def. (Netherlands) Jean-Julien Rojer / (United States) Theodore Winegar 7–6^{(7–3)}, 6–3.

== Singles main-draw entrants ==
=== Seeds ===
Country	Player	Rank^{1}	Seed
~~CRO~~	~~Dino Prižmić~~	~~93~~	~~1~~
GBR	Toby Samuel	97	2
HUN	Zsombor Piros	104	3
USA	Martin Damm	105	4
KAZ	Alexander Shevchenko	109	5
CZE	Dalibor Svrčina	120	6
FIN	Otto Virtanen	121	7
JPN	Shintaro Mochizuki	129	8
USA	Nishesh Basavareddy	131	9

- ^{1} Rankings are as of 26 October 2026.

=== Other entrants ===
The following players received wildcards into the singles main draw:

- (Slovakia) Norbert Gombos
- (Slovakia) Miloš Karol
- (Slovakia) Lukáš Pokorný

The following player received entry into the singles main draw as an alternate:

- (Switzerland) Mika Brunold

The following players received entry from the qualifying draw:

- (Czech Republic) Jonáš Forejtek
- (Slovakia) Michal Krajčí
- (France) Giovanni Mpetshi Perricard
- (France) Lucas Poullain
- (Finland) Eero Vasa
- (Czech Republic) Michael Vrbenský

The following player received entry as a lucky loser:

- (Czech Republic) Matthew William Donald
