= 2024 Iași Open – Men's doubles =

Men's doubles
- 2024 Iași Open

Final
- Champions: (Romania) Cezar Crețu (Romania) Bogdan Pavel
- Runners-up: (Poland) Karol Drzewiecki (Poland) Piotr Matuszewski
- Score: 2–6, 6–2, [10–4]

Events
Singles	men	women
Doubles	men	women
- Iași Open

Nicolás Barrientos and Aisam-ul-Haq Qureshi were the defending champions but only Qureshi chose to defend his title, partnering Dmitry Popko. They lost in the first round to Alexandru Jecan and Szymon Walków.

Cezar Crețu and Bogdan Pavel won the title after defeating Karol Drzewiecki and Piotr Matuszewski 2–6, 6–2, [10–4] in the final.

== Seeds ==
1. (Venezuela) Luis David Martínez / (Colombia) Cristian Rodríguez (quarterfinals)
2. (India) Anirudh Chandrasekar / (India) Arjun Kadhe (quarterfinals)
3. (France) Jonathan Eysseric / (United States) George Goldhoff (first round, retired)
4. (Poland) Karol Drzewiecki / (Poland) Piotr Matuszewski (final)

== Draw ==
Key

- Q = Qualifier
- WC = Wild card
- LL = Lucky loser
- Alt = Alternate
- ITF = ITF entry
- PR = Protected ranking
- SR = Special ranking
- SE = Special exempt
- JE = Junior exempt
- JR = Junior Accelerator Programme entrant
- CO = College Accelerator Programme entrant
- NG = Next Gen Accelerator Program entrant
- w/o = Walkover
- r = Retired
- d = Defaulted

=== Draw ===
First round
1	(Venezuela) LD Martínez (Colombia) C Rodríguez	6	7^{7}
(United Kingdom) S Duncan (United States) H Reese	2	6^{3}
(Kazakhstan) D Popko (Pakistan) A-u-H Qureshi	2	6^{3}
(Romania) A Jecan (Poland) S Walków	6	7^{7}
4	(Poland) K Drzewiecki (Poland) P Matuszewski	6	6
Alt	(Romania) GA Boitan (Romania) Dan Alexandru Tomescu	4	3
(Bolivia) H Dellien (Bolivia) M Dellien	2	1
(Ukraine) V Orlov (United Kingdom) D Stevenson	6	6
WC	(Romania) Daniel Uta (Czech Republic) J Veselý	3	6^{2}
(Brazil) L Britto (Israel) R Stepanov	6	7^{7}
Alt	(Argentina) T Lipovšek Puches (Romania) Matei Cristian Onofrei	1
3	(France) J Eysseric (United States) G Goldhoff	0^{r}
WC	(Romania) C Crețu (Romania) B Pavel	7	7^{8}
Alt	(Romania) ND Ionel (Romania) FC Jianu	5	6^{6}
(Jordan) A Shelbayh (Paraguay) AD Vallejo	6^{6}	2
2	(India) A Chandrasekar (India) A Kadhe	7^{8}	6

Quarterfinals
1	(Venezuela) LD Martínez (Colombia) C Rodríguez	6^{5}	3
(Romania) A Jecan (Poland) S Walków	7^{7}	6
4	(Poland) K Drzewiecki (Poland) P Matuszewski	6	6
(Ukraine) V Orlov (United Kingdom) D Stevenson	4	2
(Brazil) L Britto (Israel) R Stepanov	6	7
Alt	(Argentina) T Lipovšek Puches (Romania) MC Onofrei	1	5
WC	(Romania) C Crețu (Romania) B Pavel	7^{8}	4	[10]
2	(India) A Chandrasekar (India) A Kadhe	6^{6}	6	[2]

Semifinals
(Romania) A Jecan (Poland) S Walków	7^{7}	3	[4]
4	(Poland) K Drzewiecki (Poland) P Matuszewski	6^{5}	6	[10]
(Brazil) L Britto (Israel) R Stepanov	4	6^{3}
WC	(Romania) C Crețu (Romania) B Pavel	6	7^{7}

Final
4	(Poland) K Drzewiecki (Poland) P Matuszewski	6	2	[4]
WC	(Romania) C Crețu (Romania) B Pavel	2	6	[10]
