= Titouan Droguet =

French tennis player (born 2001)

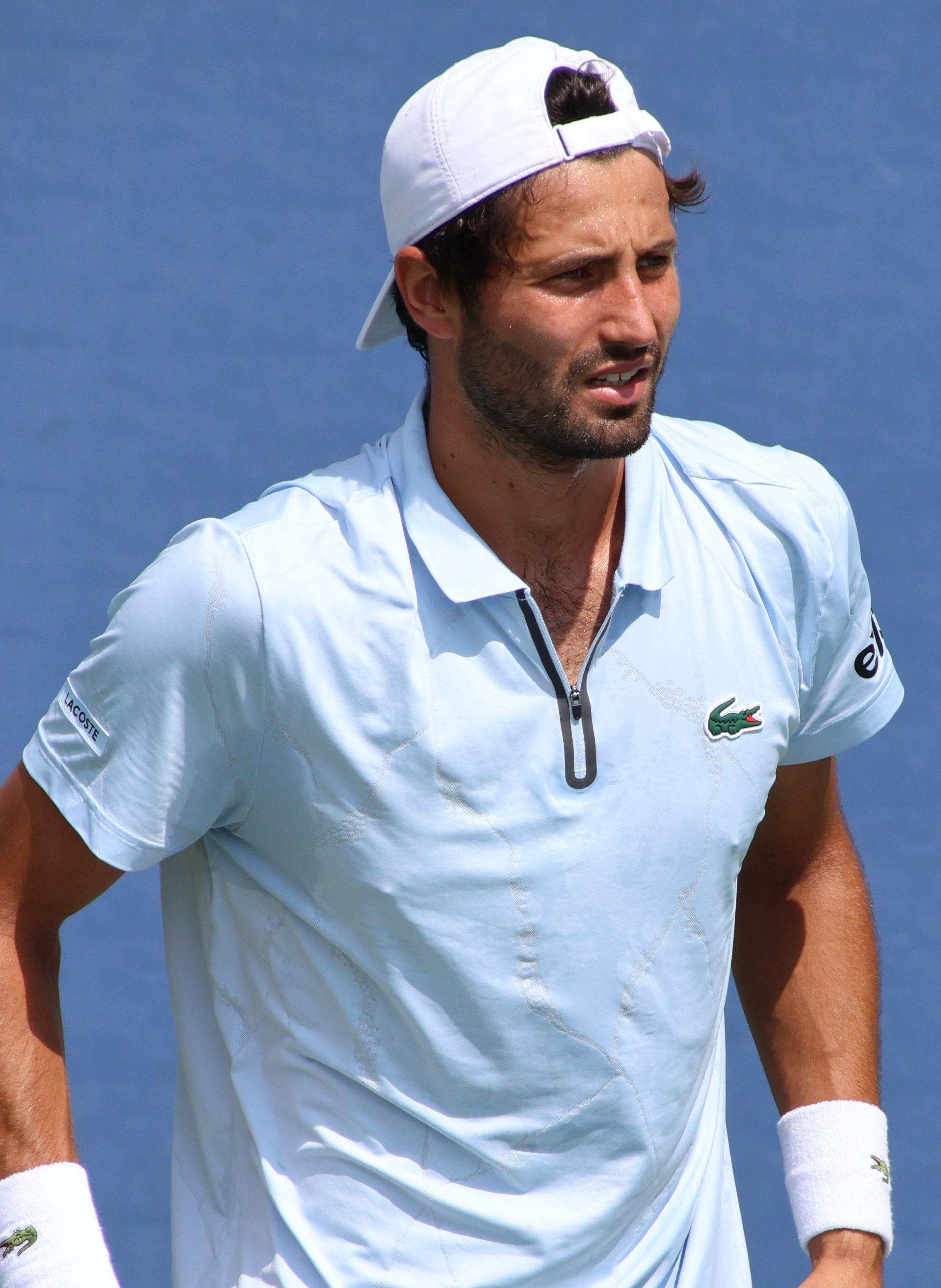
- Droguet at the 2026 US Open
- Country (sports): France
- Born: 15 June 2001 (age 25) Villeneuve-Saint-Georges, France
- Height: 1.91 m (6 ft 3 in)
- Turned pro: 2018
- Plays: Right-handed (two-handed backhand)
- Coach: Yannick Jankovits
- Prize money: US $1,636,997

Singles
- Career record: 13–13
- Career titles: 0
- Highest ranking: No. 69 (19 October 2026)
- Current ranking: No. 81 (9 November 2026)

Grand Slam singles results
- Australian Open: Q2 (2025, 2026)
- French Open: 1R (2026)
- Wimbledon: 1R (2026)
- US Open: 2R (2023)

Doubles
- Career record: 6–2
- Career titles: 1
- Highest ranking: No. 169 (27 July 2026)
- Current ranking: No. 182 (19 October 2026)

Grand Slam doubles results
- French Open: 3R (2026)
- Last updated on: 19 November 2026.

Titouan Droguet (French: [titwɑ̃ dʁɔɡɛ]; born 15 June 2001) is a French tennis player. He has a career high ATP singles ranking of world No. 69 achieved on 19 October 2026 and a doubles ranking of No. 169 achieved on 27 July 2026. Droguet has won two singles and three doubles ATP Challengers.

== Career ==
=== 2022: First ITF titles ===
In April, Droguet won his first ITF singles title in Angers, France, and in May, he won his first Challenger doubles title in Aix-en-Provence, France playing alongside Kyrian Jacquet.

=== 2023: Major debut and first win, top 200 debut ===
In February, Droguet reached his first Challenger singles final in Cherbourg, France, where he lost to third seed Giulio Zeppieri. In June, Droguet made his Grand Slam qualifying debut as a wildcard, at the French Open, losing in the first round to Andrea Vavassori.

Following two more Challenger finals, both lost, in Modena, Italy and Amersfoort, Netherlands, Droguet made his debut in the ATP top 200 at No. 185 on 23 July 2023.

Ranked No. 172, Droguet made his Grand Slam debut at the US Open as a qualifier having never won an ATP tour level match in his career. In the qualifying first round, Droguet earned his first win against a player in the top 100 by defeating Cristian Garín. In the first round of the main draw, Droguet defeated 18th seed Lorenzo Musetti, his first Grand Slam win and his first win against a top 20 player. Droguet lost in the second round to fellow qualifier Jakub Menšík.

=== 2024: Maiden Challenger title, top 150 ===
In March, Droguet reached his fourth final on the ATP Challenger Tour at the 2024 Kiskút Open in Szekesfehevar, Hungary, losing to Chun-Hsin Tseng in the final. However, he won the doubles title paired with Matteo Martineau. He reached the top 150 in the singles rankings on 6 May 2024 at world No. 146.

In May following four lost singles finals, Droguet won his maiden Challenger title as the top seed at the Francavilla al Mare Open, defeating Jacopo Berrettini.

In July, Droguet made his ATP Tour debut as a qualifier at the 2024 Swiss Open Gstaad, losing in the first round to seventh seed Fabio Fognini. In November, he played his second ATP Tour tournament as a lucky loser at the 2024 Moselle Open, losing to fellow countryman Hugo Gaston in the first round.

=== 2025: First ATP quarterfinal ===
In May, Droguet reached his first Challenger final in a year at the Tunis Open, losing to Zsombor Piros in the final. In June, he won his second Challenger title at the Royan Atlantique Open, defeating Dimitar Kuzmanov in the final. In July, Droguet reached his third Challenger final of the year at the Iași Open, losing to Elmer Møller in the final.

In July, Droguet reached his first quarterfinal on the ATP Tour at the Croatia Open as a qualifier, by defeating Cristian Garín in the first round and eighth seed Vít Kopřiva in the second round. He lost to fourth seed Damir Džumhur in the quarterfinals.

=== 2026: Maiden ATP doubles title and singles semifinal, top 75 ===
In February, Droguet reached his first semifinal on the ATP Tour at the Open Occitanie as a qualifier, defeating Tallon Griekspoor. He lost to top seed Félix Auger-Aliassime in the semifinal.

In April, Droguet made his Masters 1000 debut as a qualifier at the Madrid Open. He lost in the first round to Benjamin Bonzi.

In May, Droguet received a main draw wildcard for the 2026 French Open making his debut at his home Slam. In June, with a ranking of No. 110, he entered directly the main draw of the 2026 Wimbledon Championships, making his debut at the event.

In July, Droguet reached his second career ATP Tour quarterfinal at the Croatia Open after defeating fifth seed Alexander Blockx in the first round and compatriot Luca Van Assche in the second round. He lost to future winner Daniel Mérida in the quarterfinal. The following week, Droguet won his first ATP Tour doubles title at the Estoril Open, pairing with compatriot Kyrian Jacquet. The pair defeated second seeds Orlando Luz and Rafael Matos in the final.

In August, Droguet reached the third round of a Masters 1000 for the first time at the National Bank Open in Montreal. After qualifying for the main draw, he defeated Luca Van Assche in the first round and Jaime Faria in the second round. He lost to 28th seed Brandon Nakashima in the third round.

In September, Droguet won his third and fourth Challenger titles. He first won at the Cassis Open, defeating Mark Lajal in the final. He entered the top 100 for the first time. He then won at the Saint-Tropez Open, defeating Harold Mayot in the final. He enterd the top 75 as a result.

== Performance timeline ==
Key
W	F	SF	QF	#R	RR	Q#	DNQ	A	NH

(W) winner; (F) finalist; (SF) semifinalist; (QF) quarterfinalist; (#R) rounds 4, 3, 2, 1; (RR) round-robin stage; (Q#) qualification round; (DNQ) did not qualify; (A) absent; (NH) not held; (SR) strike rate (events won / competed); (W–L) win–loss record.

=== Singles ===
Tournament	2023	2024	2025	2026	SR	W–L	Win %
Grand Slam tournaments
Australian Open	A	Q1	Q2	Q2	0 / 0	0–0	–
French Open	Q1	Q2	Q3	1R	0 / 1	0–1	0%
Wimbledon	A	Q2	Q3	1R	0 / 1	0–1	0%
US Open	2R	Q2	Q2	Q1	0 / 1	1–1	50%
Win–loss	1–1	0–0	0–0	0–2	0 / 3	1–3	25%
ATP Masters 1000
Indian Wells Open	A	A	A	A	0 / 0	0–0	–
Miami Open	A	A	A	A	0 / 0	0–0	–
Monte-Carlo Masters	A	A	A	A	0 / 0	0–0	–
Madrid Open	A	Q1	A	1R	0 / 1	0-1	0%
Italian Open	A	A	A	Q2	0 / 0	0–0	–
Canadian Open	A	A	A	3R	0 / 1	2–1	67%
Cincinnati Open	A	A	A	1R	0 / 1	0–1	0%
Shanghai Masters	A	A	Q1	A	0 / 0	0–0	–
Paris Masters	Q1	A	A	1R	0 / 1	0–1	0%
Win–loss	0–0	0–0	0–0	2–4	0 / 4	2–4	33%
Year-End Ranking	161	183	147	80			

== ATP Tour finals ==
=== Doubles: 1 (1 title) ===
Legend Grand Slams (0–0) ATP Finals (0–0) ATP Masters 1000 (0–0) ATP 500 (0–0) ATP 250 (1–0)	Titles by surface Hard (0–0) Clay (1–0) Grass (0–0)

Result	W–L	Date	Tournament	Tier	Surface	Partner	Opponents	Score
Win	1–0	Jul 2026	Estoril Open, Portugal	ATP 250	Clay	(France) Kyrian Jacquet	(Brazil) Orlando Luz (Brazil) Rafael Matos	7–6^{(7–2)}, 6–7^{(4–7)}, [11–9]

== ATP Challenger and ITF Tour finals ==
=== Singles: 19 (8 titles, 11 runner-ups) ===
Legend (singles) ATP Challenger Tour (3–8) ITF Futures Tour (4–3)	Titles by surface Hard (2–3) Clay (6–8)

Result	W–L	Date	Tournament	Tier	Surface	Opponent	Score
Loss	0–1	Dec 2020	M15 Monastir, Tunisia	World Tennis Tour	Hard	(Turkey) Ergi Kırkın	3–6, 1–6
Win	1–1	Apr 2022	M25 Angers, France	World Tennis Tour	Clay	(Monaco) Lucas Catarina	6–1, 6–1
Win	2–1	Aug 2022	M25 Santander, Spain	World Tennis Tour	Clay	(Brazil) Oscar Jose Gutierrez	7–6^{(11–9)}, 6–0
Loss	2–2	Sep 2022	M15 Casablanca, Morocco	World Tennis Tour	Clay	(Netherlands) Max Houkes	2–6, 6–7^{(6–8)}
Win	3–2	Sep 2022	M25 Santa Margherita di Pula, Italy	World Tennis Tour	Clay	(Germany) Elmar Ejupovic	6–3, 6–2
Loss	3-3	Feb 2023	Cherbourg, France	Challenger	Hard (i)	(Italy) Giulio Zeppieri	5–7, 6–7^{(4–7)}
Win	4–3	Jun 2023	M25 Grasse, France	World Tennis Tour	Clay	(France) Maxime Chazal	6–1, 7–5
Loss	4–4	Jun 2023	M25 Montauban, France	World Tennis Tour	Clay	(Monaco) Valentin Vacherot	4–6, 6–2, 6–7^{(4–7)}
Loss	4–5	Jun 2023	Modena, Italy	Challenger	Clay	(United States) Emilio Nava	7–6^{(7–5)}, 6–7^{(6–8)}, 4–6
Loss	4–6	Jul 2023	Amersfoort, Netherlands	Challenger	Clay	(Germany) Maximilian Marterer	4–6, 2–6
Loss	4–7	Mar 2024	Szekesfehevar, Hungary	Challenger	Clay	(Chinese Taipei) Chun-Hsin Tseng	1–4 RET
Win	5–7	May 2024	Francavilla al Mare, Italy	Challenger	Clay	(Italy) Jacopo Berrettini	6–3, 7–6^{(7–4)}
Loss	5–8	May 2025	Tunis, Tunisia	Challenger	Clay	(Hungary) Zsombor Piros	5–7, 6–7^{(3–7)}
Win	6–8	Jun 2025	Royan, France	Challenger	Clay	(Bulgaria) Dimitar Kuzmanov	4–6, 6–1, 6–4
Loss	6–9	Jul 2025	Iasi, Romania	Challenger	Clay	(Denmark) Elmer Møller	6–3, 1–6, 6–7^{(3–7)}
Loss	6–10	Oct 2025	Bratislava, Slovakia	Challenger	Hard (i)	(Belgium) Alexander Blockx	4–6, 3–6
Loss	6–11	Jul 2026	Iași, Romania	Challenger	Clay	(Hungary) Zsombor Piros	1–6, 6–7^{(2–7)}
Win	7–11	Sep 2026	Cassis, France	Challenger	Hard	(Estonia) Mark Lajal	6–4, 7–6^{(7–3)}
Win	8–11	Sep 2026	Saint-Tropez, France	Challenger	Hard	(France) Harold Mayot	6–3, 7–5

=== Doubles: 13 (6–7) ===
Legend ATP Challenger (3–1) ITF Futures (3–6)	Finals by surface Hard (1–1) Clay (5–6)

Result	W–L	Date	Tournament	Tier	Surface	Partner	Opponents	Score
Loss	0–1	Jul 2018	France F14, Uriage	Futures	Clay	(France) Clément Tabur	(France) Maxime Tchoutakian (France) Hugo Voljacques	6–7^{(3–7)}, 6–2, [4–10]
Loss	0–2	Jan 2020	M15 Bagnoles-de-l'Orne	World Tennis Tour	Clay	(France) Hugo Pierre	(Belgium) Benjamin Dhoe (France) Arthur Reymond	6–1, 2–6, [8–10]
Win	1–2	Dec 2020	M15 Monastir, Tunisia	World Tennis Tour	Hard	(France) Théo Arribagé	(Austria) Alexander Erler (Austria) David Pichler	4–6, 7–6^{(7–5)}, [10–6]
Loss	1–3	Apr 2021	M25 Angers, France	World Tennis Tour	Clay	(France) Arthur Cazaux	(France) Corentin Denolly (France) Manuel Guinard	w/o
Loss	1–4	Jun 2021	M15 Helsinki, Finland	World Tennis Tour	Clay	(France) Jonathan Eysseric	(Colombia) Cristian Rodríguez (Netherlands) Glenn Smits	6–7^{(6–8)}, 2–6
Win	2–4	Jan 2022	M25 Monastir, Tunisia	World Tennis Tour	Hard	(France) Théo Arribagé	(Croatia) Zvonimir Babić (Bulgaria) Alexander Donski	1–6, 6–4, [10–8]
Loss	2–5	Mar 2022	M25 Poreč, Croatia	World Tennis Tour	Clay	(Turkey) Ergi Kırkın	(Greece) Aristotelis Thanos (Greece) Petros Tsitsipas	6–7^{(4–7)}, 6–4, [7–10]
Win	3–5	Apr 2022	M25 Angers, France	World Tennis Tour	Clay	(France) Sascha Gueymard Wayenburg	(France) Lucas Bouquet (France) Alexis Musialek	6–3, 4–6, [10–3]
Win	4–5	May 2022	Aix-en-Provence, France	Challenger	Clay	(France) Kyrian Jacquet	(Colombia) Nicolás Barrientos (Mexico) Miguel Ángel Reyes-Varela	6–2, 6–3
Loss	4–6	Aug 2022	M25 Santander, Spain	World Tennis Tour	Clay	(France) Grégoire Jacq	(Spain) Íñigo Cervantes (Spain) Sergi Pérez Contri	3–6, 4–6
Loss	4–7	Aug 2022	Toulouse, France	Challenger	Clay	(France) Théo Arribagé	(France) Maxime Janvier (Tunisia) Malek Jaziri	3–6, 6–7^{(5–7)}.
Win	5–7	Apr 2023	Roseto degli Abruzzi, Italy	Challenger	Clay	(France) Dan Added	(Italy) Jacopo Berrettini (Italy) Andrea Pellegrino	6–2, 1–6, [12–10]
Win	6–7	Mar 2024	Szekesfehevar, Hungary	Challenger	Clay	(France) Matteo Martineau	(Sweden) André Göransson (Ukraine) Denys Molchanov	4–6, 7–5, [10–8]
