= Maxime Janvier =

French tennis player (born 1996)

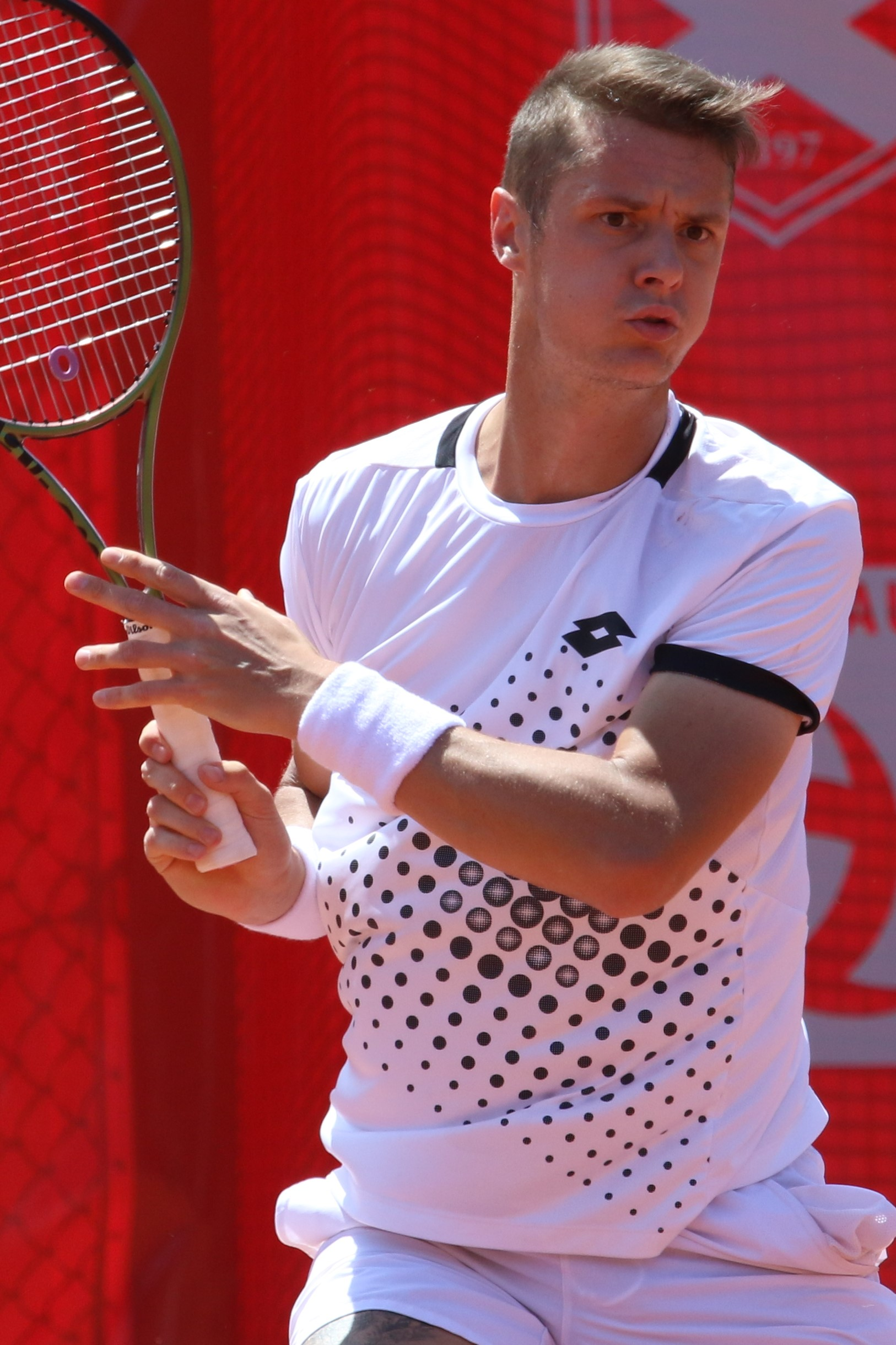
- Janvier at the 2022 BNP Paribas Primrose Bordeaux
- Country (sports): France
- Residence: Gouvieux, France
- Born: 18 October 1996 (age 30) Creil, France
- Height: 1.96 m (6 ft 5 in)
- Turned pro: 2014
- Plays: Right-handed (two-handed backhand)
- Coach: Olivier Bardeau
- Prize money: US $1,027,548

Singles
- Career record: 0–6
- Career titles: 0
- Highest ranking: No. 170 (30 September 2019)
- Current ranking: No. 606 (9 November 2026)

Grand Slam singles results
- Australian Open: Q2 (2016, 2019, 2020, 2021)
- French Open: 1R (2018, 2019, 2020)
- Wimbledon: 1R (2024)
- US Open: Q3 (2021)

Doubles
- Career record: 0–0
- Career titles: 0
- Highest ranking: No. 297 (18 October 2021)
- Last updated on: 9 November 2026.

Maxime Janvier (French pronunciation: [maksim ʒɑ̃vje]; born 18 October 1996) is a French tennis player. He has a career high ATP singles ranking of world No. 170 achieved on 30 September 2019 and a career high doubles ranking of No. 297 achieved on 18 October 2021.

== Professional career ==
=== 2014: First ITF title ===
In July, Janvier won his first ITF title at the Serbia F6, defeating Tomislav Jotovski in the final.

=== 2016: First Challenger title ===
In January, Janvier made his Grand Slam qualifying debut at the Australian Open, losing in the second round to Daniel Brands. In October, Janvier won his first ATP Challenger singles title in Casablanca, defeating Stefanos Tsitsipas in the final.

=== 2018: Grand Slam debut, top 200 ===
In June, Janvier was awarded a wildcard to the French Open, losing in the first round to twenty first seed Kei Nishikori.

=== 2019: ATP Tour debut ===
In May, Janvier made his debut on the ATP Tour as a qualifier at the Lyon Open, losing in the first round to Richard Gasquet. In June, he was awarded a wildcard to the French Open, losing in the first round to Pablo Cuevas.

=== 2020: Third consecutive French Open wildcard ===
In September, he was awarded a wildcard for the 2020 French Open but lost to compatriot Hugo Gaston in the first round.

=== 2024: Wimbledon debut ===
In July, ranked No. 225, Janvier made his debut at Wimbledon as a qualifier, his first Grand Slam main draw appearance in four years, with a win over top qualifying seed and compatriot Giovanni Mpetshi Perricard in the final qualifying round.

== Singles performance timeline ==
Key
W	F	SF	QF	#R	RR	Q#	DNQ	A	NH

(W) winner; (F) finalist; (SF) semifinalist; (QF) quarterfinalist; (#R) rounds 4, 3, 2, 1; (RR) round-robin stage; (Q#) qualification round; (DNQ) did not qualify; (A) absent; (NH) not held; (SR) strike rate (events won / competed); (W–L) win–loss record.
To avoid confusion and double counting, these charts are updated at the conclusion of a tournament or when the player's participation has ended.

Current through the 2024 French Open.

=== Singles ===
Tournament	2016	2017	2018	2019	2020	2021	2022	2023	2024	2025	SR	W–L	Win%
Australian Open	Q2	A	A	Q2	Q2	Q2	Q1	A	A	A	0 / 0	0–0	–
French Open	Q1	Q3	1R	1R	1R	Q1	A	A	Q2	A	0 / 3	0–3	0%
Wimbledon	A	A	A	Q1	NH	Q2	A	A	1R	A	0 / 1	0–1	0%
US Open	A	Q1	A	Q1	A	Q3	A	A	Q1	A	0 / 0	0–0	–
Win–loss	0–0	0–0	0–1	0–1	0–1	0–0	0–0	0–0	0–0	0–1	0 / 4	0–4	0%
ATP Masters 1000
Indian Wells Masters	A	A	A	A	NH	Q1	A	A	A	A	0 / 0	0–0	–
Miami Open	A	A	A	A	NH	A	A	A	A	A	0 / 0	0–0	–
Monte-Carlo Masters	A	A	A	A	NH	A	A	A	A	A	0 / 0	0–0	–
Madrid Open	A	A	A	A	NH	A	A	A	A	A	0 / 0	0–0	–
Italian Open	A	A	A	A	A	A	A	A	A	A	0 / 0	0–0	–
Canadian Open	A	A	A	A	NH	A	A	Q1	A	A	0 / 0	0–0	–
Cincinnati Masters	A	A	A	A	A	A	A	A	A	A	0 / 0	0–0	–
Shanghai Masters	A	A	A	A	NH			A	A		0 / 0	0–0	–
Paris Masters	A	A	A	A	A	A	A	A	A		0 / 0	0–0	–
Win–loss	0–0	0–0	0–0	0–0	0–0	0–0	0–0	0–0	0–0	0–0	0 / 0	0–0	–

== Challenger and Futures finals ==
=== Singles: 16 (9–7) ===
Legend (singles) ATP Challenger Tour (1–3) ITF Futures Tour (8–4)	Titles by surface Hard (2–5) Clay (7–2) Grass (0–0) Carpet (0–0)

Result	W–L	Date	Tournament	Tier	Surface	Opponent	Score
Win	1–0	Jul 2014	Serbia F6, Valjevo	Futures	Clay	(North Macedonia) Tomislav Jotovski	7–6^{(7–4)}, 7–6^{(8–6)}
Loss	1–1	Jun 2015	Israel F7, Ramat Gan	Futures	Hard	(Israel) Amir Weintraub	1–6, 3–6
Win	2–1	Jun 2015	Turkey F25, Istanbul	Futures	Hard	(Uzbekistan) Temur Ismailov	6–2, 6–4
Loss	2–2	Jul 2015	Turkey F26, Istanbul	Futures	Hard	(Georgia (country)) Aleksandre Metreveli	3–6, 6–2, 2–6
Win	3–2	Jul 2015	Serbia F5, Belgrade	Futures	Clay	(Brazil) João Pedro Sorgi	6–1, 6–4
Loss	3–3	Aug 2015	Finland F3, Helsinki	Futures	Clay	(Netherlands) Lennert van der Linden	6–7^{(2–7)}, 2–6
Win	4–3	Sep 2015	Iran F7, Tehran	Futures	Clay	(Croatia) Toni Androić	6–2, 6–4
Win	5–3	Sep 2015	Iran F8, Tehran	Futures	Clay	(Italy) Matteo Marfia	6–1, 6–1
Win	6–3	May 2016	France F9, Grasse	Futures	Clay	(Germany) Andreas Beck	4–6, 7–5, 7–6^{(8–6)}
Win	7–3	Aug 2016	Poland F5, Bydgoszcz	Futures	Clay	(Poland) Andriej Kapaś	6–3, 6–3
Win	8–3	Oct 2016	Casablanca, Morocco	Challenger	Clay	(Greece) Stefanos Tsitsipas	6–4, 6–0
Loss	8–4	Mar 2019	Saint Brieuc, France	Challenger	Hard (i)	(Poland) Kamil Majchrzak	3–6, 6–7^{(1–7)}
Loss	8–5	Jan 2020	Quimper, France	Challenger	Hard (i)	(Turkey) Cem İlkel	6–7^{(6–8)}, 5–7
Loss	8–6	Sep 2022	Toulouse, France	Challenger	Clay	(Belgium) Kimmer Coppejans	7–6^{(10–8)}, 4–6, 3–6
Win	9–6	Nov 2023	M25 Mulhouse, France	World Tennis Tour	Hard (i)	(France) Emilien Voisin	6–4, 6–4
Loss	9–7	Mar 2024	M25 Toulouse-Balma, France	World Tennis Tour	Hard (i)	(France) Clément Chidekh	3–6, 2–6

=== Doubles: 9 (6–3) ===
Legend (doubles) ATP Challenger Tour (1–1) ITF Futures Tour (5–2)	Titles by surface Hard (1–0) Clay (5–3) Grass (0–0) Carpet (0–0)

Result	W–L	Date	Tournament	Tier	Surface	Partner	Opponents	Score
Win	1–0	Jul 2014	Belgium F5, De Haan	Futures	Clay	(France) Florian Lakat	(Belgium) Michael Geerts (Belgium) Jonas Merckx	7–5, 6–1
Win	2–0	Jan 2015	Egypt F2, Cairo	Futures	Clay	(Poland) Kamil Majchrzak	(South Korea) Na Jung-woong (South Korea) Yun Jae-won	6–2, 6–2
Win	3–0	May 2015	Ukraine F2, Cherkassy	Futures	Clay	(Ukraine) Marat Deviatiarov	(Ukraine) Vladyslav Manafov (Ukraine) Volodymyr Uzhylovskyi	6–2, 6–2
Loss	3–1	Jul 2015	Serbia F5, Belgrade	Futures	Clay	(Switzerland) Antoine Bellier	(Serbia) Nebojša Perić (Serbia) Danilo Petrović	5–7, 2–6
Loss	3–2	Aug 2015	Finland F2, Hyvinkää	Futures	Clay	(Monaco) Romain Arneodo	(United Kingdom) Lloyd Glasspool (Denmark) Mikael Torpegaard	6–7^{(3–7)}, 2–6
Win	4–2	Sep 2015	Iran F7, Tehran	Futures	Clay	(France) Gabriel Petit	(Australia) Thomas Fancutt (Iran) Amirvala Madanchi	7–6^{(7–3)}, 6–1
Win	5–2	Mar 2016	Israel F5, Ramat HaSharon	Futures	Hard	(France) Corentin Denolly	(Switzerland) Antoine Bellier (Hungary) Gábor Borsos	4–6, 6–4, [12–10]
Loss	5-3	Aug 2021	Liberec, Czech Republic	Challenger	Clay	(France) Geoffrey Blancaneaux	(Czech Republic) Roman Jebavý (Slovakia) Igor Zelenay	2-6, 7-6^{(8–6)}, [5-10]
Win	6-3	Aug 2022	Toulouse, France	Challenger	Clay	(Tunisia) Malek Jaziri	(France) Théo Arribagé (France) Titouan Droguet	6–3, 7–6^{(7–5)}
