= 2025 Iași Open =

- Date: 7–13 July (men); 14–20 July (women)
- Edition: 6th (men); 4th (women)
- Category: ATP Challenger (men); WTA 250 (women)
- Draw: 32S / 16D / 24Q
- Prize money: €120,950 (men) €239,212 (women)
- Surface: Clay
- Location: Iași, Romania
- Venue: Baza Sportivă Ciric

Champions

Men's singles
- (Denmark) Elmer Møller

Women's singles
- (Romania) Irina-Camelia Begu

Men's doubles
- (Poland) Szymon Kielan / (Poland) Filip Pieczonka

Women's doubles
- (Slovenia) Veronika Erjavec / (Hungary) Panna Udvardy
- Iași Open

The 2025 Iași Open (known as the Unicredit Iași Open for women and Concord Iași Open for men for sponsorship reasons) was a professional tennis tournament to be played on outdoor clay courts. It was the sixth edition of the men's tournament, which was part of the 2025 ATP Challenger Tour, and the fourth edition of the women's tournament, which was a WTA 250 tournament on the 2025 WTA Tour. It took place in Iași, Romania between 7 and 13 July for the men and between 14 and 20 July for the women.

== Champions ==
=== Men's singles ===
- (Denmark) Elmer Møller def. (France) Titouan Droguet 3–6, 6–1, 7–6^{(7–2)}.

=== Women's singles ===
- (Romania) Irina-Camelia Begu def. (Switzerland) Jil Teichmann, 6−0, 7−5

=== Men's doubles ===
- (Poland) Szymon Kielan / (Poland) Filip Pieczonka def. (Canada) Cleeve Harper / (United States) Ryan Seggerman 7–5, 6–3.

=== Women's doubles ===
- (Slovenia) Veronika Erjavec / (Hungary) Panna Udvardy def. (Argentina) María Lourdes Carlé / (Switzerland) Simona Waltert 7–5, 6–3

== Points and prize money ==
=== Point distribution ===
| Event | W | F | SF | QF | Round of 16 | Round of 32 | Q | Q2 | Q1 |
| Men's singles | 100 | 50 | 25 | 14 | 7 | 0 | 4 | 2 | 0 |
| Men's doubles | 100 | 60 | 36 | 20 | 0 | —N/a | —N/a | —N/a | —N/a |
| Women's singles | 250 | 163 | 98 | 54 | 30 | 1 | 18 | 12 | 1 |
| Women's doubles | 250 | 163 | 98 | 54 | 1 | —N/a | —N/a | —N/a | —N/a |

=== Prize money ===
| Event | W | F | SF | QF | Round of 16 | Round of 32 | Q2 | Q1 |
| Men's singles | €20,630 | €12,110 | €7,225 | €4,195 | €2,450 | €1,515 | €700 | €350 |
| Men's doubles* | €7,220 | €4,180 | €2,520 | €1,470 | €840 | —N/a | —N/a | —N/a |
| Women's singles | €31,565 | €18,685 | €10,410 | €5,925 | €3,624 | €2,585 | €1,915 | €1,235 |
| Women's doubles* | €11,100 | €6,460 | €3,700 | €2,210 | €1,700 | —N/a | —N/a | —N/a |

_{*per team}

== Men's singles main-draw entrants ==
=== Seeds ===
| Country | Player | Rank^{1} | Seed |
|---|---|---|---|
| BOL | Hugo Dellien | 79 | 1 |
| FRA | Hugo Gaston | 86 | 2 |
| ESP | Carlos Taberner | 102 | 3 |
| DEN | Elmer Møller | 117 | 4 |
| BRA | Felipe Meligeni Alves | 145 | 5 |
| SUI | Stan Wawrinka | 153 | 6 |
| FRA | Calvin Hemery | 178 | 7 |
| CRO | Duje Ajduković | 183 | 8 |

- ^{1} Rankings as of 30 June 2025.

=== Other entrants ===
The following players received wildcards into the singles main draw:

- (Romania) Cezar Crețu
- (Romania) Luca Preda
- (Switzerland) Stan Wawrinka

The following player received entry into the singles main draw using a protected ranking:

- (Spain) Pablo Llamas Ruiz

The following players received entry into the singles main draw as alternates:

- (Portugal) Frederico Ferreira Silva
- (Brazil) João Lucas Reis da Silva
- (Chile) Matías Soto

The following players received entry from the qualifying draw:

- (Moldova) Radu Albot
- (Romania) Sebastian Gima
- (Brazil) Matheus Pucinelli de Almeida
- (Spain) Oriol Roca Batalla
- (Germany) Marko Topo
- (Czech Republic) Michael Vrbenský

== Women's singles main-draw entrants ==
=== Seeds ===
| Country | Player | Rank^{1} | Seed |
|---|---|---|---|
| ARM | Elina Avanesyan | 49 | 1 |
| ROU | Jaqueline Cristian | 52 | 2 |
| USA | Ann Li | 65 | 3 |
| ESP | Nuria Párrizas Díaz | 82 | 4 |
| FRA | Varvara Gracheva | 92 | 5 |
| SUI | Jil Teichmann | 93 | 6 |
| ROU | Irina-Camelia Begu | 115 | 7 |
| GBR | Francesca Jones | 122 | 8 |

- ^{1} Rankings as of 30 June 2025.

=== Other entrants ===
The following players received wildcards into the singles main draw:

- (Romania) Ana Bogdan
- (Romania) Miriam Bulgaru
- (Romania) Andreea Prisăcariu
- (Romania) Patricia Maria Țig

The following players received entry using a protected ranking:

- (Romania) Mihaela Buzărnescu
- (Latvia) Anastasija Sevastova

The following players received entry from the qualifying draw:

- (Spain) Irene Burillo
- (Spain) Alicia Herrero Liñana
- Daria Lodikova
- (Romania) Giulia Safina Popa
- (France) Margaux Rouvroy
- (Czech Republic) Anna Sisková

=== Withdrawals ===
- (Czech Republic) Sára Bejlek → replaced by (Spain) Guiomar Maristany
- (Italy) Lucia Bronzetti → replaced by (Croatia) Jana Fett
- (Italy) Elisabetta Cocciaretto → replaced by (Romania) Mihaela Buzărnescu
- (France) Léolia Jeanjean → replaced by (Slovenia) Veronika Erjavec
- (Montenegro) Danka Kovinić → replaced by (Poland) Katarzyna Kawa
- (United States) Alycia Parks → replaced by (Japan) Nao Hibino
- (Greece) Maria Sakkari → replaced by (Romania) Sorana Cîrstea
- (Romania) Anca Todoni → replaced by (Hungary) Panna Udvardy

== Women's doubles main-draw entrants ==
=== Seeds ===
| Country | Player | Country | Player | Rank^{†} | Seed |
|---|---|---|---|---|---|
| | Iryna Shymanovich | CZE | Anna Sisková | 148 | 1 |
| USA | Quinn Gleason | BRA | Ingrid Martins | 150 | 2 |
| GBR | Emily Appleton | NED | Isabelle Haverlag | 175 | 3 |
| POL | Maja Chwalińska | CZE | Anastasia Dețiuc | 187 | 4 |

† Rankings are as of 30 June 2025

=== Other entrants ===
The following pairs received wildcards into the main draw:

- (Romania) Ana Bogdan / (Switzerland) Jil Teichmann
- (Romania) Georgia Crăciun / (Romania) Andreea Prisăcariu
