= 2026 Valle D'Aosta Ladies Open =

- Date: 26 October–1 November
- Edition: 2nd
- Category: WTA 125
- Draw: 32S / 8Q / 8D
- Prize money: €100,000
- Surface: Hard (Indoor)
- Location: Courmayeur, Italy
- Venue: Courmayeur Sport Center

Champions

Singles
- (Armenia) Alina Charaeva

Doubles
- (United States) Catherine Harrison / (United States) Dalayna Hewitt
- Courmayeur Ladies Open

The 2026 Valle D'Aosta Ladies Open was a professional women's tennis tournament played on indoor hard courts. It was the second edition of the tournament and first as a WTA 125 event, which was part of the 2026 WTA 125 Circuit. It was held at the Courmayeur Sport Center in Courmayeur, Italy, from 26 October until 1 November, 2026. The first edition was held as a WTA 250 tournament in 2021.

== Singles main draw entrants ==
=== Seeds ===
Country	Player	Rank^{1}	Seed
FRA	Anna Blinkova	72	1
ARM	Alina Charaeva	97	2
ESP	Oksana Selekhmeteva	101	3
ITA	Lucrezia Stefanini	107	4
ITA	Lisa Pigato	108	5
GER	Noma Noha Akugue	127	6
ESP	Marina Bassols Ribera	130	7
SUI	Susan Bandecchi	139	8

- Rankings are as of 19 October 2026.

=== Other entrants ===
The following players received wildcards into the main draw:

- (Montenegro) Danka Kovinić
- (Italy) Laura Mair
- (Italy) Jessica Pieri
- (Italy) Isabella Maria Șerban

The following players received entry from the qualifying draw:

- (Italy) Enola Chiesa
- (Ukraine) Yelyzaveta Kotliar
- (Italy) Gaia Maduzzi
- (Hungary) Adrienn Nagy

=== Withdrawals ===
Before the tournament

- (Italy) Samira De Stefano → replaced by (Germany) Caroline Werner
- (Czech Republic) Lucie Havlíčková → replaced by (Ukraine) Katarina Zavatska
- (Czech Republic) Dominika Šalková → replaced by (Sweden) Lisa Zaar

== Doubles main draw entrants ==
=== Seeds ===
Country	Player	Country	Player	Rank^{1}	Seed
USA	Catherine Harrison	USA	Dalayna Hewitt	224	1
GBR	Madeleine Brooks	SWE	Lisa Zaar	277	2

- Rankings are as of 19 October 2026.

=== Other entrants ===
The following pairs received wildcards into the doubles main draw:

- (Italy) Laura Mair / (Italy) Isabella Maria Șerban

== Champions ==
=== Singles ===
- (Armenia) Alina Charaeva def. (Germany) Noma Noha Akugue 6–3, 6–4

=== Doubles ===
- (United States) Catherine Harrison / (United States) Dalayna Hewitt def. (United Kingdom) Madeleine Brooks / (Sweden) Lisa Zaar 6–4, 6–4
