= 2026 Iași Open =

- Date: 6–12 July (men); 13–20 July (women)
- Edition: 7th (men); 5th (women)
- Category: ATP Challenger (men); WTA 250 (women)
- Draw: 32S / 16D / 24Q
- Surface: Clay
- Location: Iași, Romania
- Venue: Baza Sportivă Ciric

Champions

Men's singles
- (Hungary) Zsombor Piros

Women's singles
- (Egypt) Mayar Sherif

Men's doubles
- (Sweden) Erik Grevelius / (Sweden) Adam Heinonen

Women's doubles
- (Czech Republic) Anastasia Dețiuc / Irina Khromacheva
- Iași Open

The 2026 Iași Open (known as the Unicredit Iași Open for women and Concord Iași Open for men for sponsorship reasons) was a professional tennis tournament played on outdoor clay courts. It was the seventh edition of the men's tournament, which was part of the 2026 ATP Challenger Tour, and the fifth edition of the women's tournament, which was a WTA 250 tournament on the 2026 WTA Tour. It took place in Iași, Romania between 6 and 12 July for the men and between 13 and 20 July for the women.

== Champions ==
=== Men's singles ===
- (Hungary) Zsombor Piros def. (France) Titouan Droguet 6–1, 7–6^{(7–2)}.

=== Women's singles ===
- (Egypt) Mayar Sherif def. (Spain) Paula Badosa, 6–4, 4–0, ret.

=== Men's doubles ===
- (Sweden) Erik Grevelius / (Sweden) Adam Heinonen def. (Serbia) Ivan Sabanov / (Serbia) Matej Sabanov 6–4, 6–2.

=== Women's doubles ===
- (Czech Republic) Anastasia Dețiuc / Irina Khromacheva def. (Armenia) Alina Charaeva / (Kazakhstan) Zhibek Kulambayeva 4–6, 6–2, [10–5].

== Points and prize money ==
=== Point distribution ===
Event	W	F	SF	QF	Round of 16	Round of 32	Q	Q2	Q1
Men's singles	100	50	25	14	7	0	4	2	0
Men's doubles	100	60	36	20	0	—N/a	—N/a	—N/a	—N/a
Women's singles	250	163	98	54	30	1	18	12	1
Women's doubles	250	163	98	54	1	—N/a	—N/a	—N/a	—N/a

=== Prize money ===
Event	W	F	SF	QF	Round of 16	Round of 32	Q2	Q1
Men's singles	€23,750	€14,000	€8,355	€4,855	€2,780	€1,605	€810	€415
Men's doubles*	€7,220	€4,180	€2,520	€1,470	€840	—N/a	—N/a	—N/a
Women's singles	€32,520	€19,240	€10,730	€6,110	€3,725	€2,663	€1,960	€1,270
Women's doubles*	€11,830	€6,650	€3,820	€2,280	€1,760	—N/a	—N/a	—N/a

_{*per team}

== Men's singles main-draw entrants ==
=== Seeds ===
Country	Player	Rank^{1}	Seed
FRA	Valentin Royer	75	1
~~CRO~~	~~Dino Prižmić~~	~~89~~	~~2~~
BIH	Damir Džumhur	105	3
FRA	Titouan Droguet	116	4
ESP	Pedro Martínez	134	5
CHI	Tomás Barrios Vera	137	6
BRA	Gustavo Heide	141	7
CZE	Zdeněk Kolář	154	8

- ^{1} Rankings as of 29 June 2026.

=== Other entrants ===
The following players received wildcards into the singles main draw:

- (Romania) Gabriel Ghețu
- (Romania) Ștefan Paloși
- (Romania) Radu Mihai Papoe

The following player received entry into the singles main draw through the Next Gen Accelerator programme:

- (France) Thomas Faurel

The following players received entry into the singles main draw as alternates:

- (Romania) Cezar Crețu
- (Poland) Maks Kaśnikowski
- Ilia Simakin

The following players received entry from the qualifying draw:

- (India) S D Prajwal Dev
- (Bulgaria) Alexander Donski
- (France) Mathys Erhard
- (Romania) Ștefan Horia Haita
- (Algeria) Samir Hamza Reguig
- (Sweden) Olle Wallin

The following players received entry as lucky losers:

- (Spain) Àlex Martí Pujolràs
- (Austria) Maximilian Neuchrist
- (Czech Republic) David Poljak

== Women's singles main-draw entrants ==
=== Seeds ===
Country	Player	Rank^{1}	Seed
~~ROU~~	~~Jaqueline Cristian~~	~~38~~	~~1~~
CRO	Petra Marčinko	47	2
UKR	Oleksandra Oliynykova	53	3
UKR	Anhelina Kalinina	66	4
HUN	Panna Udvardy	69	5
ROU	Elena-Gabriela Ruse	71	6
HUN	Anna Bondár	74	7
FRA	Elsa Jacquemot	80	8
KAZ	Yulia Putintseva	84	9

- ^{1} Rankings as of 29 June 2026.

=== Other entrants ===
The following players received wildcards into the singles main draw:

- (Romania) Miriam Bulgaru
- (France) Clara Burel
- (Argentina) Nadia Podoroska
- (Spain) Sara Sorribes Tormo

The following players received entry from the qualifying draw:

- (Romania) Ilinca Amariei
- (Armenia) Elina Avanesyan
- Alevtina Ibragimova
- (United States) Claire Liu
- Elena Pridankina
- (Spain) Leyre Romero Gormaz

The following players received entry as lucky losers:

- (United States) Varvara Lepchenko
- (Turkey) İpek Öz

=== Withdrawals ===
- (Poland) Maja Chwalińska → replaced by (Hungary) Dalma Gálfi
- (Romania) Sorana Cîrstea → replaced by (Czech Republic) Dominika Šalková
- (Romania) Jaqueline Cristian → replaced by (United States) Varvara Lepchenko
- (France) Léolia Jeanjean → replaced by (Turkey) İpek Öz
- (Germany) Tamara Korpatsch → replaced by (France) Léolia Jeanjean
- (Argentina) Nadia Podoroska (PR) → replaced by (Slovenia) Tamara Zidanšek
- (Argentina) Solana Sierra → replaced by (Armenia) Alina Charaeva
- (Spain) Sara Sorribes Tormo (PR) → replaced by (Spain) Paula Badosa
- (Switzerland) Jil Teichmann → replaced by (Poland) Katarzyna Kawa

== Women's doubles main-draw entrants ==
=== Seeds ===
Country	Player	Country	Player	Rank^{†}	Seed
BEL	Magali Kempen		Alexandra Panova	89	1
CZE	Jesika Malečková	CZE	Miriam Škoch	100	2
CZE	Anastasia Dețiuc		Irina Khromacheva	119	3
	Maria Kozyreva		Elena Pridankina	135	4

† Rankings are as of 29 June 2026

=== Other entrants ===
The following pairs received wildcards into the main draw:

- (Romania) Ilinca Amariei / (Romania) Carmen Andreea Herea
- (Romania) Alexandra Irina Anghel / (Romania) Diana-Ioana Simionescu

The following pair received entry as alternates:

- (Romania) Alesia Breaz / (Romania) Cristiana Todoni

=== Withdrawals ===
- (Colombia) Emiliana Arango / (Hungary) Panna Udvardy → replaced by (Romania) Alesia Breaz / (Romania) Cristiana Todoni
