= 2026 Iași Open – Women's singles =

Women's singles
- 2026 Iași Open

Final
- Champion: (Egypt) Mayar Sherif
- Runner-up: (Spain) Paula Badosa
- Score: 6–4, 4–0, ret.
- Date: 20 July 2026

Details
- Draw: 32
- Seeds: 8

Events
Singles	men	women
Doubles	men	women
- Iași Open

Mayar Sherif won the women's singles tennis title at the 2026 Iași Open after Paula Badosa retired in the final with the score at 6–4, 4–0. It was her second WTA Tour singles title, and first since 2022.

Irina-Camelia Begu was the reigning champion, but withdrew before the tournament due to a toe injury.

== Seeds ==
1. (Romania) Jaqueline Cristian (withdrew)
2. (Croatia) Petra Marčinko (quarterfinals)
3. (Ukraine) Oleksandra Oliynykova (semifinals)
4. (Ukraine) Anhelina Kalinina (first round)
5. (Hungary) Panna Udvardy (quarterfinals)
6. (Romania) Elena-Gabriela Ruse (first round)
7. (Hungary) Anna Bondár (second round)
8. (France) Elsa Jacquemot (second round)
9. (Kazakhstan) Yulia Putintseva (quarterfinals)

== Draw ==
Key

- Q = Qualifier
- WC = Wild card
- LL = Lucky loser
- Alt = Alternate
- ITF = ITF entry
- PR = Protected ranking
- SR = Special ranking
- SE = Special exempt
- JE = Junior exempt
- JR = Junior Accelerator Programme entrant
- CO = College Accelerator Programme entrant
- NG = Next Gen Accelerator Program entrant
- w/o = Walkover
- r = Retired
- d = Defaulted

=== Finals ===
Semifinals
(Egypt) Mayar Sherif	6	6
3	(Ukraine) Oleksandra Oliynykova	3	1
(Spain) Paula Badosa	3	7	7^{7}
(Slovenia) Tamara Zidanšek	6	5	6^{1}

Final
(Egypt) Mayar Sherif	6	4
(Spain) Paula Badosa	4	0^{r}

=== Top half ===
First round
9	(Kazakhstan) Y Putintseva	7	6
Q	(United States) C Liu	5	2
(Armenia) A Charaeva	6	6
(Andorra) V Jiménez Kasintseva	0	1
(Egypt) M Sherif	6	6
(Hungary) D Gálfi	2	0
(Spain) K Quevedo	6	6
6	(Romania) E-G Ruse	3	1
3	(Ukraine) O Oliynykova	7^{7}	7^{7}
LL	(Turkey) İ Öz	6^{1}	6^{5}
WC	(Romania) M Bulgaru	5	1
Q	E Pridankina	7	6
WC	(France) C Burel	2	7	6
LL	(United States) V Lepchenko	6	5	3
Q	(Romania) I Amariei	4	6^{5}
8	(France) E Jacquemot	6	7^{7}

Second round
9	(Kazakhstan) Y Putintseva	6	6
(Armenia) A Charaeva	3	3
(Egypt) M Sherif	6	7^{7}
(Spain) K Quevedo	3	6^{2}
3	(Ukraine) O Oliynykova	6	6
Q	E Pridankina	1	2
WC	(France) C Burel	6	6
8	(France) E Jacquemot	1	1

Quarterfinals
9	(Kazakhstan) Y Putintseva	2	6	6^{5}
(Egypt) M Sherif	6	3	7^{7}
3	(Ukraine) O Oliynykova	6	7
WC	(France) C Burel	4	5

Semifinals
(Egypt) M Sherif	6	6
3	(Ukraine) O Oliynykova	3	1

=== Bottom half ===
First round
5	(Hungary) P Udvardy	6	4	6
Q	(Spain) L Romero Gormaz	3	6	3
(Poland) K Kawa	6	6
(Switzerland) S Waltert	1	4
(Czech Republic) D Šalková	2	5
Q	A Ibragimova	6	7
(Spain) P Badosa	6	6
4	(Ukraine) A Kalinina	3	1
7	(Hungary) A Bondár	7	6
WC	(Spain) S Sorribes Tormo	5	4
(Colombia) E Arango	7	2	3
(Slovenia) T Zidanšek	5	6	6
Q	(Armenia) E Avanesyan	6	6
(Japan) M Uchijima	2	4
WC	(Argentina) N Podoroska	2	6	4
2	(Croatia) P Marčinko	6	3	6

Second round
5	(Hungary) P Udvardy	1	7	6
(Poland) K Kawa	6	5	2
Q	A Ibragimova	6^{5}	6	4
(Spain) P Badosa	7^{7}	1	6
7	(Hungary) A Bondár	6^{5}	7^{7}	5
(Slovenia) T Zidanšek	7^{7}	6^{5}	7
Q	(Armenia) E Avanesyan	6^{3}	6^{5}
2	(Croatia) P Marčinko	7^{7}	7^{7}

Quarterfinals
5	(Hungary) P Udvardy	4	6^{2}
(Spain) P Badosa	6	7^{7}
(Slovenia) T Zidanšek	6	7
2	(Croatia) P Marčinko	3	5

Semifinals
(Spain) P Badosa	3	7	7^{7}
(Slovenia) T Zidanšek	6	5	6^{1}

== Qualifying ==
=== Seeds ===
1. (Spain) Leyre Romero Gormaz (qualified)
2. (United States) Claire Liu (qualified)
3. (United States) Varvara Lepchenko (qualifying competition, lucky loser)
4. Elena Pridankina (qualified)
5. (Armenia) Elina Avanesyan (qualified)
6. (Germany) Caroline Werner (first round)
7. Alevtina Ibragimova (qualified)
8. (Sweden) Lisa Zaar (first round)
9. (Turkey) İpek Öz (qualifying competition, lucky loser)
10. Ekaterina Kazionova (first round)
11. (Italy) Tatiana Pieri (first round)
12. (Romania) Andreea Prisăcariu (first round)

=== Qualifiers ===
1. (Spain) Leyre Romero Gormaz
2. (United States) Claire Liu
3. Alevtina Ibragimova
4. Elena Pridankina
5. (Armenia) Elina Avanesyan
6. (Romania) Ilinca Amariei

=== Lucky losers ===
1. (United States) Varvara Lepchenko
2. (Turkey) İpek Öz

=== Qualifying draw ===
==== First qualifier ====
First round
1	(Spain) Leyre Romero Gormaz	6	6
WC	(Romania) Cristiana Todoni	0	3
(Kazakhstan) Zhibek Kulambayeva	7^{7}	6
8	(Sweden) Lisa Zaar	6^{4}	3

Qualifying competition
1	(Spain) Leyre Romero Gormaz	6	6
(Kazakhstan) Zhibek Kulambayeva	1	4

==== Second qualifier ====
First round
2	(United States) Claire Liu	6	6
(Romania) Maria Sara Popa	3	4
(Slovakia) Martina Okáľová	0	3
9	(Turkey) İpek Öz	6	6

Qualifying competition
2	(United States) Claire Liu	6	6
9	(Turkey) İpek Öz	4	1

==== Third qualifier ====
First round
3	(United States) Varvara Lepchenko	4	6	6
WC	(Romania) Maia Ilinca Burcescu	6	3	3
Maria Kozyreva	2	0
7	Alevtina Ibragimova	6	6

Qualifying competition
3	(United States) Varvara Lepchenko	3	4
7	Alevtina Ibragimova	6	6

==== Fourth qualifier ====
First round
4	Elena Pridankina	6	6
(Romania) Eva Maria Ionescu	1	2
(Spain) Georgina García Pérez	6	6
12	(Romania) Andreea Prisăcariu	1	4

Qualifying competition
4	Elena Pridankina	6	6
(Spain) Georgina García Pérez	1	1

==== Fifth qualifier ====
First round
5	(Armenia) Elina Avanesyan	6	6
(Germany) Emily Seibold	2	0
WC	(Romania) Irina Fetecău	6	5	6
11	(Italy) Tatiana Pieri	4	7	1

Qualifying competition
5	(Armenia) Elina Avanesyan	6	6
WC	(Romania) Irina Fetecău	2	2

==== Sixth qualifier ====
First round
6	(Germany) Caroline Werner	6	4	2
WC	(Romania) Ilinca Amariei	0	6	6
(Romania) Carmen Andreea Herea	6	7
10	Ekaterina Kazionova	3	5

Qualifying competition
WC	(Romania) Ilinca Amariei	3	6	6
(Romania) Carmen Andreea Herea	6	4	2
