= 2021 Courmayeur Ladies Open – Singles =

Singles
- 2021 Courmayeur Ladies Open

Final
- Champion: (Croatia) Donna Vekić
- Runner-up: (Denmark) Clara Tauson
- Score: 7–6^{(7–3)}, 6–2

Details
- Draw: 32 (6Q / 3WC)
- Seeds: 8

Events
Singles	Doubles
- Courmayeur Ladies Open

This was the first edition of the tournament.

Donna Vekić defeated Clara Tauson in the final, 7–6^{(7–3)}, 6–2 to win the singles title at the 2021 Courmayeur Ladies Open. It was Vekić's first title since 2017 and she didn't drop a set all week.

== Seeds ==
1. (Tunisia) Ons Jabeur (withdrew)
2. (Italy) Camila Giorgi (withdrew)
3. (Russia) Liudmila Samsonova (semifinals)
4. (Croatia) Petra Martić (first round)
5. (Denmark) Clara Tauson (final)
6. (United States) Alison Riske (second round)
7. (Italy) Jasmine Paolini (semifinals)
8. (China) Zhang Shuai (second round)
9. (United States) Ann Li (quarterfinals)
10. (Ukraine) Dayana Yastremska (quarterfinals)

== Draw ==
Key

- Q = Qualifier
- WC = Wild card
- LL = Lucky loser
- Alt = Alternate
- ITF = ITF entry
- PR = Protected ranking
- SR = Special ranking
- SE = Special exempt
- JE = Junior exempt
- JR = Junior Accelerator Programme entrant
- CO = College Accelerator Programme entrant
- NG = Next Gen Accelerator Program entrant
- w/o = Walkover
- r = Retired
- d = Defaulted

=== Finals ===
Semifinals
7	(Italy) Jasmine Paolini	2	0
(Croatia) Donna Vekić	6	6
3	(Russia) Liudmila Samsonova	6	6^{8}	4
5	(Denmark) Clara Tauson	4	7^{10}	6

Final
(Croatia) Donna Vekić	7^{7}	6
5	(Denmark) Clara Tauson	6^{3}	2

=== Top half ===
First round
10	(Ukraine) D Yastremska	6	6
PR	(Russia) V Diatchenko	3	1
(Italy) L Bronzetti	1	3
PR	(Ukraine) K Kozlova	6	6
WC	(Italy) L Stefanini	6	3	7
PR	(Luxembourg) M Minella	3	6	5
Q	(Italy) M Di Giuseppe	4	1
7	(Italy) J Paolini	6	6
4	(Croatia) P Martić	3	4
(China) S Zheng	6	6
(Croatia) D Vekić	7^{7}	6
Q	(China) Q Zheng	6^{1}	2
(China) Xin Wang	6	5
Q	(Spain) C Bucșa	1	0^{r}
WC	(Italy) J Pieri	1	3
8	(China) S Zhang	6	6

Second round
10	(Ukraine) D Yastremska	6	3	7
PR	(Ukraine) K Kozlova	1	6	5
WC	(Italy) L Stefanini	4	5
7	(Italy) J Paolini	6	7
(China) S Zheng	3	4
(Croatia) D Vekić	6	6
(China) Xin Wang	7^{7}	6
8	(China) S Zhang	6^{5}	4

Quarterfinals
10	(Ukraine) D Yastremska	4	6^{4}
7	(Italy) J Paolini	6	7^{7}
(Croatia) D Vekić	6	6
(China) Xin Wang	4	4

Semifinals
7	(Italy) J Paolini	2	0
(Croatia) D Vekić	6	6

=== Bottom half ===
First round
6	(United States) A Riske	6	6
LL	(India) A Raina	1	1
(Russia) A Kalinskaya	6	6
(Italy) M Trevisan	2	4
Q	(Spain) A Bolsova	6	6^{2}	6
(Chinese Taipei) S-w Hsieh	1	7^{7}	4
Q	(Germany) S Wagner	3	0
3	(Russia) L Samsonova	6	6
5	(Denmark) C Tauson	6	6
(Switzerland) S Vögele	2	2
Q	(Italy) G Gatto-Monticone	6	7^{7}
WC	(Italy) M Caregaro	4	6^{3}
LL	(Poland) U Radwańska	2	4
(Poland) M Fręch	6	6
(Russia) K Rakhimova	6	3	4
9	(United States) A Li	4	6	6

Second round
6	(United States) A Riske	3	6	3
(Russia) A Kalinskaya	6	0	6
Q	(Spain) A Bolsova	3	3
3	(Russia) L Samsonova	6	6
5	(Denmark) C Tauson	6	6
Q	(Italy) G Gatto-Monticone	4	1
(Poland) M Fręch	7	3	1
9	(United States) A Li	5	6	6

Quarterfinals
(Russia) A Kalinskaya	1	2
3	(Russia) L Samsonova	6	6
5	(Denmark) C Tauson	3	6	6
9	(United States) A Li	6	4	2

Semifinals
3	(Russia) L Samsonova	6	6^{8}	4
5	(Denmark) C Tauson	4	7^{10}	6

== Qualifying ==
=== Seeds ===
1. (Spain) Cristina Bucșa (qualified)
2. (China) Zheng Qinwen (qualified)
3. (Russia) Natalia Vikhlyantseva (first round)
4. (Spain) Aliona Bolsova (qualified)
5. (Italy) Giulia Gatto-Monticone (qualified)
6. (India) Ankita Raina (qualifying competition, lucky loser)
7. (Poland) Urszula Radwańska (qualifying competition, lucky loser)
8. (Italy) Federica Di Sarra (qualifying competition)
9. (Luxembourg) Mandy Minella (moved to main draw)
10. (United States) Emina Bektas (first round)
11. (United Kingdom) Naiktha Bains (first round)
12. (Italy) Martina Di Giuseppe (qualified)

=== Qualifiers ===
1. (Spain) Cristina Bucșa
2. (China) Zheng Qinwen
3. (Germany) Stephanie Wagner
4. (Spain) Aliona Bolsova
5. (Italy) Giulia Gatto-Monticone
6. (Italy) Martina Di Giuseppe

=== Lucky losers ===
1. (India) Ankita Raina
2. (Poland) Urszula Radwańska

=== Qualifying draw ===
==== First qualifier ====
First round
1	(Spain) Cristina Bucșa	6	6
(Italy) Stefania Rubini	1	1
WC	(Italy) Federica Rossi	7	6
10	(United States) Emina Bektas	5	4

Qualifying competition
1	(Spain) Cristina Bucșa	6	6
WC	(Italy) Federica Rossi	2	4

==== Second qualifier ====
First round
2	(China) Zheng Qinwen	6	6
(Italy) Cristiana Ferrando	3	3
WC	(Italy) Angelica Moratelli	2	1
7	(Poland) Urszula Radwańska	6	6

Qualifying competition
2	(China) Zheng Qinwen	6	6
7	(Poland) Urszula Radwańska	2	2

==== Third qualifier ====
First round
3	(Russia) Natalia Vikhlyantseva	2	6^{4}
(United Kingdom) Tara Moore	6	7^{7}
(Germany) Stephanie Wagner	6	2	6
11/PR	(United Kingdom) Naiktha Bains	3	6	3

Qualifying competition
(United Kingdom) Tara Moore	3	3
(Germany) Stephanie Wagner	6	6

==== Fourth qualifier ====
First round
4	(Spain) Aliona Bolsova	6	6
WC	(Italy) Lisa Pigato	2	4
WC	(Italy) Aurora Zantedeschi	3	5
8	(Italy) Federica Di Sarra	6	7

Qualifying competition
4	(Spain) Aliona Bolsova	3	7^{8}	6
8	(Italy) Federica Di Sarra	6	6^{6}	2

==== Fifth qualifier ====
First round				Qualifying competition
5	(Italy) Giulia Gatto-Monticone	6	6
	(Japan) Chihiro Muramatsu	0	2
	(Japan) Chihiro Muramatsu	0	2	5	(Italy) Giulia Gatto-Monticone	6	6
				WC	(Georgia (country)) Oksana Kalashnikova	1	4

==== Sixth qualifier ====
First round
6	(India) Ankita Raina	6	6
WC	(Netherlands) Rosalie van der Hoek	2	1
(Germany) Vivian Heisen	6^{5}	1
12	(Italy) Martina Di Giuseppe	7^{7}	6

Qualifying competition
6	(India) Ankita Raina	3	4
12	(Italy) Martina Di Giuseppe	6	6
