= 2021 Courmayeur Ladies Open =

- Date: 25–31 October
- Edition: 1st
- Category: WTA 250
- Draw: 32S / 16Q / 16D
- Prize money: $235,238
- Surface: Hard (Indoor)
- Location: Courmayeur, Italy
- Venue: Courmayeur Sport Center

Champions

Singles
- (Croatia) Donna Vekić

Doubles
- (China) Wang Xinyu / (China) Zheng Saisai
- Courmayeur Ladies Open

The 2021 Courmayeur Ladies Open was a women's tennis tournament played on indoor hard courts. It was the first edition of the Courmayeur Ladies Open, and part of the WTA 250 series of the 2021 WTA Tour. It was held at the Courmayeur Sport Center in Courmayeur, Italy, from 25 until 31 October, 2021.

== Champions ==
=== Singles ===
- (Croatia) Donna Vekić def. (Denmark) Clara Tauson 7–6^{(7–3)}, 6–2

This was Vekić's third WTA singles title, and first since 2017.

=== Doubles ===
- (China) Wang Xinyu / (China) Zheng Saisai def. (Japan) Eri Hozumi / (China) Zhang Shuai 6–4, 3–6, [10–5]

== Singles main draw entrants ==
=== Seeds ===
Country	Player	Rank^{1}	Seed
~~TUN~~	~~Ons Jabeur~~	~~8~~	~~1~~
~~ITA~~	~~Camila Giorgi~~	~~36~~	~~2~~
RUS	Liudmila Samsonova	42	3
CRO	Petra Martić	47	4
DEN	Clara Tauson	48	5
USA	Alison Riske	49	6
ITA	Jasmine Paolini	54	7
CHN	Zhang Shuai	55	8
USA	Ann Li	60	9
UKR	Dayana Yastremska	76	10

- Rankings are as of October 18, 2021.

=== Other entrants ===
The following players received wildcards into the main draw:

- (Italy) Martina Caregaro
- (Italy) Jessica Pieri
- (Italy) Lucrezia Stefanini

The following players received entry using a protected ranking into the main draw:

- (Russia) Vitalia Diatchenko
- (Ukraine) Kateryna Kozlova
- (Luxembourg) Mandy Minella

The following players received entry from the qualifying draw:

- (Spain) Aliona Bolsova
- (Spain) Cristina Bucșa
- (Italy) Martina Di Giuseppe
- (Italy) Giulia Gatto-Monticone
- (Germany) Stephanie Wagner
- (China) Zheng Qinwen

The following players received entry as lucky losers:

- (Poland) Urszula Radwańska
- (India) Ankita Raina

=== Withdrawals ===
Before the tournament

- (Switzerland) Belinda Bencic → replaced by (Russia) Kamilla Rakhimova
- (United States) Danielle Collins → replaced by (Russia) Anna Kalinskaya
- (Italy) Camila Giorgi → replaced by (Poland) Urszula Radwańska
- (Tunisia) Ons Jabeur → replaced by (India) Ankita Raina
- (Czech Republic) Tereza Martincová → replaced by (Luxembourg) Mandy Minella
- (Belgium) Greet Minnen → replaced by (Chinese Taipei) Hsieh Su-wei
- (Spain) Nuria Párrizas Díaz → replaced by (Croatia) Donna Vekić
- (Kazakhstan) Elena Rybakina → replaced by (Ukraine) Kateryna Kozlova
- (Greece) Maria Sakkari → replaced by (Switzerland) Stefanie Vögele
- (Czech Republic) Kateřina Siniaková → replaced by (Italy) Lucia Bronzetti
- (Spain) Sara Sorribes Tormo → replaced by (Poland) Magdalena Fręch

== Doubles main draw entrants ==
=== Seeds ===
Country	Player	Country	Player	Rank^{1}	Seed
CZE	Marie Bouzková	CZE	Lucie Hradecká	67	1
UKR	Nadiia Kichenok	ROU	Raluca Olaru	73	1
JPN	Eri Hozumi	CHN	Zhang Shuai	83	3
FRA	Elixane Lechemia	USA	Sabrina Santamaria	141	4

- Rankings are as of October 18, 2021.

=== Other entrants ===
The following pairs received wildcards into the doubles main draw:

- (Italy) Lucia Bronzetti / (Italy) Martina Caregaro
- (Italy) Giulia Gatto-Monticone / (Italy) Lisa Pigato

The following pair received entry as alternates:

- (Russia) Natalia Vikhlyantseva / (China) Zheng Qinwen

=== Withdrawals ===
Before the tournament

- (Italy) Cristiana Ferrando / (Chinese Taipei) Hsieh Su-wei → replaced by (Russia) Natalia Vikhlyantseva / (China) Zheng Qinwen
- (Croatia) Darija Jurak / (Slovenia) Andreja Klepač → replaced by (Russia) Vitalia Diatchenko / (Russia) Alexandra Panova
- (Germany) Julia Lohoff / (Russia) Kamilla Rakhimova → replaced by (Spain) Aliona Bolsova / (Russia) Kamilla Rakhimova
