= 2026 China Open – Women's singles =

Women's singles
- 2026 China Open

Final
- Champion: (China) Zheng Qinwen
- Runner-up: Mirra Andreeva
- Score: 7–5, 6–4
- Date: 11 October 2026

Details
- Draw: 96 (12 Q / 8 WC )
- Seeds: 32

Events
Singles	men	women
Doubles	men	women
- China Open

Zheng Qinwen defeated Mirra Andreeva in the final, 7–5, 6–4 to win the women's singles tennis title at the 2026 China Open. It was her first WTA 1000 title, sixth WTA Tour title overall, and first title in over two years. Zheng became the first Chinese player and first wildcard to win the China Open. She was also the second Chinese player to reach the women's singles final, after Chen Li in 1996.

Amanda Anisimova was the reigning champion, but she withdrew before the tournament due to a wrist injury.

This marked the first tournament played by Elena Rybakina as the incumbent world No. 1. With her second-round defeat to Alina Charaeva, Rybakina became the second player (since the introduction of the WTA rankings) to lose their first match played as world No. 1, after Naomi Osaka at the 2019 Dubai Tennis Championships. Ranked No. 118, Charaeva became the lowest-ranked player to defeat an incumbent world No. 1 from a set down at a WTA Tour event since the rankings began in 1975.

== Seeds ==
All seeds received a bye into the second round.

1. (Kazakhstan) Elena Rybakina (second round)
2. Aryna Sabalenka (third round)
3. (United States) Coco Gauff (fourth round)
4. Mirra Andreeva (final)
5. (Czech Republic) Linda Nosková (fourth round)
6. (Ukraine) Elina Svitolina (quarterfinals)
7. (Czech Republic) Karolína Muchová (quarterfinals)
8. (Poland) Iga Świątek (quarterfinals)
9. (Switzerland) Belinda Bencic (third round)
10. (United States) Iva Jovic (fourth round)
11. Diana Shnaider (third round)
12. (Japan) Naomi Osaka (fourth round)
13. (Belgium) Elise Mertens (semifinals)
14. (Italy) Jasmine Paolini (second round)
15. Anna Kalinskaya (second round, retired)
16. (Austria) Anastasia Potapova (second round, retired)
17. (Poland) Maja Chwalińska (second round)
18. (Czech Republic) Marie Bouzková (third round)
19. Ekaterina Alexandrova (quarterfinals)
20. (Czech Republic) Sára Bejlek (third round)
21. (United States) Ann Li (fourth round)
22. (France) Diane Parry (second round)
23. (Canada) Leylah Fernandez (second round)
24. (Latvia) Jeļena Ostapenko (third round)
25. (Greece) Maria Sakkari (third round)
26. (Czech Republic) Nikola Bartůňková (semifinals)
27. (Spain) Cristina Bucșa (second round)
28. (United States) Peyton Stearns (second round)
29. Liudmila Samsonova (third round)
30. (Croatia) Donna Vekić (third round)
31. (China) Wang Xinyu (second round)
32. (Denmark) Clara Tauson (second round)

Click on the seed number of a player to go to their draw section.

== Draw ==
Key

- Q = Qualifier
- WC = Wild card
- LL = Lucky loser
- Alt = Alternate
- ITF = ITF entry
- PR = Protected ranking
- SR = Special ranking
- SE = Special exempt
- JE = Junior exempt
- JR = Junior Accelerator Programme entrant
- CO = College Accelerator Programme entrant
- NG = Next Gen Accelerator Program entrant
- w/o = Walkover
- r = Retired
- d = Defaulted

=== Finals ===
Quarterfinals
WC	(China) Zheng Qinwen	6	7^{8}
6	(Ukraine) Elina Svitolina	3	6^{6}
13	(Belgium) Elise Mertens	7^{7}	6
8	(Poland) Iga Świątek	6^{0}	3
19	Ekaterina Alexandrova	6^{4}	6^{3}
4	Mirra Andreeva	7^{7}	7^{7}
7	(Czech Republic) Karolína Muchová	3	0
26	(Czech Republic) Nikola Bartůňková	6	6

Semifinals
WC	(China) Zheng Qinwen	7	6
13	(Belgium) Elise Mertens	5	2
4	Mirra Andreeva	6	6
26	(Czech Republic) Nikola Bartůňková	2	2

Final
WC	(China) Zheng Qinwen	7	6
4	Mirra Andreeva	5	4

=== Top half ===
==== Section 1 ====
First round
(Ukraine) Y Starodubtseva	7	5	2
(Armenia) A Charaeva	5	7	6
PR	(United Kingdom) S Kartal	6	6
Q	(Spain) A Lázaro García	2	3
PR	(Japan) A Ito	1	1
(Australia) K Birrell	6	6
WC	(China) Q Zheng	7^{8}	4	6
Q	(China) H Shi	6^{6}	6	2

Second round
1	(Kazakhstan) E Rybakina	6	4	3
(Armenia) A Charaeva	3	6	6
PR	(United Kingdom) S Kartal	6	6
31	(China) Xin Wang	3	2
18	(Czech Republic) M Bouzková	6	6
(Australia) K Birrell	4	4
WC	(China) Q Zheng	6^{4}	6	3
15	A Kalinskaya	7^{7}	4	0^{r}

Third round
(Armenia) A Charaeva	6	6
PR	(United Kingdom) S Kartal	4	1
18	(Czech Republic) M Bouzková	6^{3}	6	5
WC	(China) Q Zheng	7^{7}	4	7

Fourth round
(Armenia) A Charaeva	1	6	4
WC	(China) Q Zheng	6	2	6

==== Section 2 ====
First round
WC	(China) Y Shao	0	2
A Zakharova	6	6
(United States) S Kenin	3	3
(United States) A Krueger	6	6
WC	(China) Y Lin	2	1
Q	(Australia) S Hunter	6	6
(Poland) M Linette	4	3
(Czech Republic) K Siniaková	6	6

Second round
9	(Switzerland) B Bencic	6	7^{7}
A Zakharova	1	6^{3}
(United States) A Krueger	4	2
21	(United States) A Li	6	6
25	(Greece) M Sakkari	6	6
Q	(Australia) S Hunter	2	2
(Czech Republic) K Siniaková	6	4	2
6	(Ukraine) E Svitolina	1	6	6

Third round
9	(Switzerland) B Bencic	4	3
21	(United States) A Li	6	6
25	(Greece) M Sakkari	4	5
6	(Ukraine) E Svitolina	6	7

Fourth round
21	(United States) A Li	2	3
6	(Ukraine) E Svitolina	6	6

==== Section 3 ====
First round
(Thailand) L Tararudee	3	3
(Colombia) C Osorio	6	6
(Germany) E Lys	1	0^{r}
WC	(China) X Sun	6	3
(Spain) P Badosa	4	7^{9}	6
(Australia) D Kasatkina	6	6^{7}	4
(United States) K Volynets	7	7
Q	(United States) R Montgomery	5	5

Second round
3	(United States) C Gauff	7^{7}	4	6
(Colombia) C Osorio	6^{4}	6	2
WC	(China) X Sun	6	7
27	(Spain) C Bucșa	4	5
24	(Latvia) J Ostapenko	7^{7}	7
(Spain) P Badosa	6^{5}	5
(United States) K Volynets	0	6	5
13	(Belgium) E Mertens	6	4	7

Third round
3	(United States) C Gauff	7	6
WC	(China) X Sun	5	1
24	(Latvia) J Ostapenko	2	6	3
13	(Belgium) E Mertens	6	3	6

Fourth round
3	(United States) C Gauff	3	3
13	(Belgium) E Mertens	6	6

==== Section 4 ====
First round
Q	(United Kingdom) H Dart	6	6^{5}	7
WC	(China) Y Qu	2	7^{7}	5
Q	(Spain) M Bassols Ribera	4	6^{2}
(Uzbekistan) K Rakhimova	6	7^{7}
(United States) A Parks	4	2
WC	(China) L Zhu	6	6
WC	(China) X Gao	6	6
(Hungary) P Udvardy	2	3

Second round
10	(United States) I Jovic	2	6	6
Q	(United Kingdom) H Dart	6	3	3
(Uzbekistan) K Rakhimova	6	4	6
23	(Canada) L Fernandez	2	6	3
30	(Croatia) D Vekić	6	4	6
WC	(China) L Zhu	1	6	2
WC	(China) X Gao	2	3
8	(Poland) I Świątek	6	6

Third round
10	(United States) I Jovic	6	7
(Uzbekistan) K Rakhimova	1	5
30	(Croatia) D Vekić	6	6^{0}	2
8	(Poland) I Świątek	4	7^{7}	6

Fourth round
10	(United States) I Jovic	1	3
8	(Poland) I Świątek	6	6

=== Bottom half ===
==== Section 5 ====
First round
(Romania) E-G Ruse	6	6
(Austria) L Tagger	4	2
(Switzerland) V Golubic	6	6
LL	(United States) E Kalieva	3	1
Q	A Sasnovich	6	6
(Australia) T Gibson	1	4
(Indonesia) J Tjen	2	7	6
(Ukraine) A Kalinina	6	5	4

Second round
5	(Czech Republic) L Nosková	6	6
(Romania) E-G Ruse	4	1
(Switzerland) V Golubic	6	3	6
28	(United States) P Stearns	4	6	3
19	E Alexandrova	6	6
Q	A Sasnovich	1	4
(Indonesia) J Tjen	0	4
11	D Shnaider	6	6

Third round
5	(Czech Republic) L Nosková	6	6
(Switzerland) V Golubic	2	1
19	E Alexandrova	3	6	6
11	D Shnaider	6	4	3

Fourth round
5	(Czech Republic) L Nosková	2	2
19	E Alexandrova	6	6

==== Section 6 ====
First round
(Ukraine) D Snigur	3	6	7
Q	(Poland) K Kawa	6	4	5
(Australia) T Preston	6	7^{7}
(Germany) T Korpatsch	2	6^{4}
LL	(China) Y Ma	7^{7}	3	2
(Uzbekistan) P Kudermetova	6^{2}	6	6
(Ukraine) O Oliynykova	2	3
WC	(China) Y Yuan	6	6

Second round
14	(Italy) J Paolini	6	6^{5}	2
(Ukraine) D Snigur	3	7^{7}	6
(Australia) T Preston	7^{7}	6
22	(France) D Parry	6^{4}	1
32	(Denmark) C Tauson	4	6	4
(Uzbekistan) P Kudermetova	6	4	6
WC	(China) Y Yuan	6	0	0
4	M Andreeva	3	6	6

Third round
(Ukraine) D Snigur	6	6
(Australia) T Preston	1	0
(Uzbekistan) P Kudermetova	4	1
4	M Andreeva	6	6

Fourth round
(Ukraine) D Snigur	2	2
4	M Andreeva	6	6

==== Section 7 ====
First round
Q	(Japan) M Hontama	3	4
(United Kingdom) K Boulter	6	6
Q	(China) Z Bai	2	3
LL	(Czech Republic) L Fruhvirtová	6	6
Q	(Australia) M Inglis	6	6
(Turkey) Z Sönmez	4	4
(Czech Republic) D Vidmanova	3	3
(Uzbekistan) M Timofeeva	6	6

Second round
7	(Czech Republic) K Muchová	7^{7}	6
(United Kingdom) K Boulter	6^{3}	1
LL	(Czech Republic) L Fruhvirtová	2	6	3
29	L Samsonova	6	3	6
20	(Czech Republic) S Bejlek	6	7
Q	(Australia) M Inglis	3	5
(Uzbekistan) M Timofeeva	3	6	3
12	(Japan) N Osaka	6	3	6

Third round
7	(Czech Republic) K Muchová	4	6	6
29	L Samsonova	6	4	2
20	(Czech Republic) S Bejlek	6^{4}	4
12	(Japan) N Osaka	7^{7}	6

Fourth round
7	(Czech Republic) K Muchová	7	1	7^{9}
12	(Japan) N Osaka	5	6	6^{7}

==== Section 8 ====
First round
(Australia) M Joint	3	6	5
(Austria) S Kraus	6	3	7
(United States) C McNally	3	4
(Ukraine) D Yastremska	6	6
Q	(France) E Jacquemot	5	6	4
(Poland) M Fręch	7	3	6
(Hungary) A Bondár	6^{4}	3
(Mexico) R Zarazúa	7^{7}	6

Second round
16	(Austria) A Potapova	1^{r}
(Austria) S Kraus	4
(Ukraine) D Yastremska	6	6
17	(Poland) M Chwalińska	3	1
26	(Czech Republic) N Bartůňková	6	6
(Poland) M Fręch	2	2
(Mexico) R Zarazúa	1	3
2	A Sabalenka	6	6

Third round
(Austria) S Kraus	6	6
(Ukraine) D Yastremska	1	4
26	(Czech Republic) N Bartůňková	6	6
2	A Sabalenka	4	3

Fourth round
(Austria) S Kraus	0	6	3
26	(Czech Republic) N Bartůňková	6	4	6

== Seeded players ==
The following are the seeded players. Seedings are based on WTA rankings as of 21 September 2026. Rankings and points before are as of 28 September 2026.

Because the tournament takes place one week later this year, the points defending column also includes results from the 2025 Wuhan Open, which took place during the week of 6 October 2025. Beijing points are shown first in the points defending and points earned columns.

^{‡}	Champion
^{†}	Runner-up

Seed	Rank	Player	Points before	Points defending	Points earned	Points after	Status
1	1	(Kazakhstan) Elena Rybakina	9,901	(215)^{§}	10	9,696	Second round lost to (Armenia) Alina Charaeva
2	2	Aryna Sabalenka	7,875	0+390	65+0	7,550	Third round lost to (Czech Republic) Nikola Bartůňková [26]
3	4	(United States) Coco Gauff	7,244	390+1,000	120+0	5,974	Fourth round lost to (Belgium) Elise Mertens [13]
4	5	Mirra Andreeva^{†}	5,841	120	650	6,371	Runner-up, lost to (China) Zheng Qinwen [WC]
5	6	(Czech Republic) Linda Nosková	5,328	650+120	120+1	4,679	Fourth round lost to Ekaterina Alexandrova [19]
6	7	(Ukraine) Elina Svitolina	4,809	0	215	5,024	Quarterfinals lost to (China) Zheng Qinwen [WC]
7	8	(Czech Republic) Karolína Muchová	4,683	120+65	215+60	4,773	Quarterfinals lost to (Czech Republic) Nikola Bartůňková [26]
8	9	(Poland) Iga Świątek	4,119	120+215	215+0	3,999	Quarterfinals lost to (Belgium) Elise Mertens [13]
9	12	(Switzerland) Belinda Bencic	2,925	120+120	65+10	2,760	Third round lost to (United States) Ann Li [21]
10	13	(United States) Iva Jovic	2,841	10+140	120+49	2,860	Fourth round lost to (Poland) Iga Świątek [8]
11	14	Diana Shnaider	2,588	10	65	2,643	Third round lost to Ekaterina Alexandrova [19]
12	17	(Japan) Naomi Osaka	2,296	10+65	120+10	2,351	Fourth round lost to (Czech Republic) Karolína Muchová [7]
13	19	(Belgium) Elise Mertens	2,165	10+65	390+60	2,540	Semifinals lost to (China) Zheng Qinwen [WC]
14	20	(Italy) Jasmine Paolini	2,122	215+390	10+1	1,528	Second round lost to (Ukraine) Daria Snigur
15	22	Anna Kalinskaya	2,043	10	10	2,043	Second round retired against (China) Zheng Qinwen [WC]
16	25	(Austria) Anastasia Potapova	1,926	120	10	1,816	Second round retired against (Austria) Sinja Kraus
17	21	(Poland) Maja Chwalińska	2,082	(49)^{∆}	10	2,043	Second round lost to (Ukraine) Dayana Yastremska
18	27	(Czech Republic) Marie Bouzková	1,873	120+65	65+10^{Ω}	1,763	Third round lost to (China) Zheng Qinwen [WC]
19	28	Ekaterina Alexandrova	1,811	10+120	215+10^{Ω}	1,906	Quarterfinals lost to Mirra Andreeva [4]
20	29	(Czech Republic) Sára Bejlek	1,710	(125)^{∆}	65	1,650	Third round lost to (Japan) Naomi Osaka [12]
21	30	(United States) Ann Li	1,573	10+65	120+30	1,648	Fourth round lost to (Ukraine) Elina Svitolina [6]
22	31	(France) Diane Parry	1,551	20	10	1,541	Second round lost to (Australia) Taylah Preston
23	26	(Canada) Leylah Fernandez	1,894	65	10	1,839	Second round lost to (Uzbekistan) Kamilla Rakhimova
24	32	(Latvia) Jeļena Ostapenko	1,481	10+10	65+1	1,527	Third round lost to (Belgium) Elise Mertens [13]
25	33	(Greece) Maria Sakkari	1,462	35	65	1,492	Third round lost to (Ukraine) Elina Svitolina [6]
26	34	(Czech Republic) Nikola Bartůňková	1,352	(81)^{∆}	390	1,661	Semifinals lost to Mirra Andreeva [4]
27	35	(Spain) Cristina Bucșa	1,349	65	10	1,294	Second round lost to (China) Sun Xinran [WC]
28	36	(United States) Peyton Stearns	1,316	10	10	1,316	Second round lost to (Switzerland) Viktorija Golubic
29	39	Liudmila Samsonova	1,284	120	65	1,229	Third round lost to (Czech Republic) Karolína Muchová [7]
30	40	(Croatia) Donna Vekić	1,278	10+10	65+2	1,325	Third round lost to (Poland) Iga Świątek [8]
31	38	(China) Wang Xinyu	1,288	10	10	1,288	Second round lost to (United Kingdom) Sonay Kartal [PR]
32	44	(Denmark) Clara Tauson	1,184	10+120	10+1	1,065	Second round lost to (Uzbekistan) Polina Kudermetova

§ The player is defending points from Wuhan only, as her 2025 Beijing result was not required to be counted in her ranking points as of 28 September 2026.
∆ The player did not qualify for the tournament in 2025. She is defending points from a WTA 125 tournament (Rende or Samsun) instead.
Ω The player's 2025 Wuhan result is being replaced by her next best non-combined WTA 1000 tournament result.

=== Withdrawn seeded players ===
The following players would have been seeded, but withdrew before the tournament began.

Rank	Player	Points before	Points defending	Points after	Withdrawal reason
3	(United States) Jessica Pegula	7,265	650+390	6,225	Back Injury
10	(Ukraine) Marta Kostyuk	4,040	120+10	3,910	Wrist injury
11	(United States) Amanda Anisimova	3,363	1000+0	2,363	Wrist injury
15	(Canada) Victoria Mboko	2,521	10+10	2,502^{§}	Left knee injury
16	(Romania) Sorana Cîrstea	2,464	35+65	2,424^{§}	Calf injury
18	(Philippines) Alexandra Eala	2,276	(35)^{∆}	2,241	Conflict with the Asian Games
23	(United States) Madison Keys	2,029	0+0	2,110^{§}	Abdominal injury
24	(United States) Emma Navarro	2,024	215	1,809	Illness

§ The player's 2025 Wuhan result was replaced by her next best result (1 point for Mboko, 60 points for Cîrstea, 81 points for Keys).
∆ The player is defending points from her sixth best combined WTA 1000 tournament result.

== Other entry information ==
=== Wildcards ===
- (China) Gao Xinyu
- (China) Lin Yujun
- (China) Qu Yihan
- (China) Shao Yushan
- (China) Sun Xinran
- (China) Yuan Yue
- (China) Zheng Qinwen
- (China) Zhu Lin

=== Protected ranking ===
- (Japan) Aoi Ito
- (United Kingdom) Sonay Kartal

=== Withdrawals ===
- ‡ (United States) Amanda Anisimova → replaced by (Armenia) Alina Charaeva
- § (United States) Hailey Baptiste → replaced by (United States) Katie Volynets
- ‡ (Romania) Sorana Cîrstea → replaced by (Uzbekistan) Polina Kudermetova
- ‡ (Italy) Elisabetta Cocciaretto → replaced by (Ukraine) Dayana Yastremska
- § (Romania) Jaqueline Cristian → replaced by (United States) Alycia Parks
- § (Philippines) Alexandra Eala → replaced by (Croatia) Petra Marčinko
- ‡ (United States) McCartney Kessler → replaced by (Japan) Aoi Ito
- ‡ (United States) Madison Keys → replaced by (Spain) Paula Badosa
- † Alina Korneeva → replaced by (Czech Republic) Linda Fruhvirtová (LL)
- ‡ (Ukraine) Marta Kostyuk → replaced by (Uzbekistan) Kamilla Rakhimova
- ‡ (Czech Republic) Barbora Krejčíková → replaced by (Germany) Eva Lys
- † (Croatia) Petra Marčinko → replaced by (United States) Elvina Kalieva (LL)
- § (Canada) Victoria Mboko → replaced by (Thailand) Lanlana Tararudee
- ‡ (United States) Emma Navarro → replaced by (United States) Sofia Kenin
- ‡ (United States) Jessica Pegula → replaced by Anastasia Zakharova
- ‡ (Czech Republic) Karolína Plíšková → replaced by (Poland) Magda Linette
- ‡ (United Kingdom) Emma Raducanu → replaced by (Austria) Sinja Kraus (Note: Replaced first by Hanne Vandewinkel, who later withdrew.)
- † (Egypt) Mayar Sherif → replaced by (China) Ma Yexin (LL)
- ‡ (Czech Republic) Tereza Valentová → replaced by (Australia) Taylah Preston
- ‡ (China) Zhang Shuai → replaced by (Uzbekistan) Maria Timofeeva

§ – not included on entry list
‡ – withdrew from entry list
† – withdrew from main draw

== Qualifying ==
=== Seeds ===
1. (Ukraine) Dayana Yastremska (moved to main draw)
2. (United Kingdom) Harriet Dart (qualified)
3. (United States) Elvina Kalieva (qualifying competition, lucky loser)
4. (Spain) Marina Bassols Ribera (qualified)
5. (Poland) Katarzyna Kawa (qualified)
6. Aliaksandra Sasnovich (qualified)
7. (Spain) Andrea Lázaro García (qualified)
8. (Australia) Maddison Inglis (qualified)
9. (Slovenia) Tamara Zidanšek (first round)
10. (Slovakia) Rebecca Šramková (first round)
11. (France) Elsa Jacquemot (qualified)
12. (United States) Robin Montgomery (qualified)
13. (Japan) Mai Hontama (qualified)
14. (China) Ma Yexin (qualifying competition, lucky loser)
15. (Czech Republic) Linda Fruhvirtová (qualifying competition, lucky loser)
16. (Australia) Storm Hunter (qualified)
17. (United States) Varvara Lepchenko (qualifying competition)
18. (China) You Xiaodi (qualifying competition)
19. Darya Astakhova (qualifying competition)
20. (Spain) Irene Burillo (first round)
21. (China) Bai Zhuoxuan (qualified)
22. (United States) Vivian Wolff (qualifying competition)
23. (China) Shi Han (qualified)
24. (Germany) Anna-Lena Friedsam (qualifying competition)

=== Qualifiers ===
1. (China) Bai Zhuoxuan
2. (United Kingdom) Harriet Dart
3. (China) Shi Han
4. (Spain) Marina Bassols Ribera
5. (Poland) Katarzyna Kawa
6. Aliaksandra Sasnovich
7. (Spain) Andrea Lázaro García
8. (Australia) Maddison Inglis
9. (Australia) Storm Hunter
10. (Japan) Mai Hontama
11. (France) Elsa Jacquemot
12. (United States) Robin Montgomery

=== Lucky losers ===
1. (United States) Elvina Kalieva
2. (Czech Republic) Linda Fruhvirtová
3. (China) Ma Yexin

=== Qualifying draw ===
==== First qualifier ====
First round
Alt	(United States) Quinn Gleason	2	5
WC	(China) Wang Jiayi	6	7
(Germany) Mina Hodzic	4	3
21/PR	(China) Bai Zhuoxuan	6	6

Qualifying competition
WC	(China) Wang Jiayi	1	0
21/PR	(China) Bai Zhuoxuan	6	6

==== Second qualifier ====
First round
2	(United Kingdom) Harriet Dart	6	6
(France) Tiphanie Lemaître	2	3
WC	(China) Ren Yufei	6	1	3
14	(China) Ma Yexin	4	6	6

Qualifying competition
2	(United Kingdom) Harriet Dart	6	6
14	(China) Ma Yexin	3	2

==== Third qualifier ====
First round
3	(United States) Elvina Kalieva	6	6
(Australia) Ellen Perez	2	4
(Slovakia) Tereza Mihalíková	0	2
23	(China) Shi Han	6	6

Qualifying competition
3	(United States) Elvina Kalieva	7^{7}	5	3
23	(China) Shi Han	6^{5}	7	6

==== Fourth qualifier ====
First round
4	(Spain) Marina Bassols Ribera	6	6
(United Kingdom) Olivia Nicholls	1	1
WC	(China) Dang Yiming	2	3
18	(China) You Xiaodi	6	6

Qualifying competition
4	(Spain) Marina Bassols Ribera	6	6
18	(China) You Xiaodi	4	4

==== Fifth qualifier ====
First round
5	(Poland) Katarzyna Kawa	7^{8}	2	6
(Japan) Rinko Matsuda	6^{6}	6	3
Valeria Savinykh	6	6
20	(Spain) Irene Burillo	4	4

Qualifying competition
5	(Poland) Katarzyna Kawa	6	7
Valeria Savinykh	3	5

==== Sixth qualifier ====
First round
6	Aliaksandra Sasnovich	6	6
WC	(China) Zhang Junhan	2	0
(Norway) Ulrikke Eikeri	2	4
17	(United States) Varvara Lepchenko	6	6

Qualifying competition
6	Aliaksandra Sasnovich	6	6
17	(United States) Varvara Lepchenko	4	1

==== Seventh qualifier ====
First round
7	(Spain) Andrea Lázaro García	1	6	6
WC	(China) Tian Jialin	6	4	4
WC	(China) Ye Shiyu	7	3	6^{1}
15	(Czech Republic) Linda Fruhvirtová	5	6	7^{7}

Qualifying competition
7	(Spain) Andrea Lázaro García	6	6
15	(Czech Republic) Linda Fruhvirtová	1	3

==== Eighth qualifier ====
First round
8	(Australia) Maddison Inglis	6	7
(China) Yao Xinxin	1	5
(United States) Desirae Krawczyk	2	1
19	Darya Astakhova	6	6

Qualifying competition
8	(Australia) Maddison Inglis	6	7
19	Darya Astakhova	2	5

==== Ninth qualifier ====
First round
9	(Slovenia) Tamara Zidanšek	4	6^{7}
Ksenia Zaytseva	6	7^{9}
WC	(China) Zhang Ruien	6	3	2
16	(Australia) Storm Hunter	3	6	6

Qualifying competition
Ksenia Zaytseva	0	1
16	(Australia) Storm Hunter	6	6

==== Tenth qualifier ====
First round
10	(Slovakia) Rebecca Šramková	4	4
PR	(United Kingdom) Jodie Burrage	6	6
Alexandra Panova	5	1
13	(Japan) Mai Hontama	7	6

Qualifying competition
PR	(United Kingdom) Jodie Burrage	6	1	2
13	(Japan) Mai Hontama	2	6	6

==== Eleventh qualifier ====
First round
11	(France) Elsa Jacquemot	6	6
WC	(China) Li Zongyu	4	0
PR	(Canada) Carol Zhao	1	1
22	(United States) Vivian Wolff	6	6

Qualifying competition
11	(France) Elsa Jacquemot	6	6
22	(United States) Vivian Wolff	3	4

==== Twelfth qualifier ====
First round
12	(United States) Robin Montgomery	6	6
(Spain) Aran Teixidó García	1	3
(Finland) Anastasia Kulikova	4	6^{7}
24	(Germany) Anna-Lena Friedsam	6	7^{9}

Qualifying competition
12	(United States) Robin Montgomery	6	6
24	(Germany) Anna-Lena Friedsam	3	2
