= 2026 Valle D'Aosta Ladies Open – Doubles =

Doubles
- 2026 Valle D'Aosta Ladies Open

Final
- Champions: (United States) Catherine Harrison (United States) Dalayna Hewitt
- Runners-up: (United Kingdom) Madeleine Brooks (Sweden) Lisa Zaar
- Score: 6–4, 6–4

Details
- Draw: 8
- Seeds: 2

Events
Singles	Doubles
- Courmayeur Ladies Open

Wang Xinyu and Zheng Saisai were the reigning champions when the tournament was held as a WTA 250 event in 2021, but chose not to participate.

Catherine Harrison and Dalayna Hewitt won the title, after defeating Madeleine Brooks and Lisa Zaar 6–4, 6–4 in the final.

== Seeds ==
1. (United States) Catherine Harrison / (United States) Dalayna Hewitt (champions)
2. (United Kingdom) Madeleine Brooks / (Sweden) Lisa Zaar (final)

== Draw ==
Key

- Q = Qualifier
- WC = Wild card
- LL = Lucky loser
- Alt = Alternate
- ITF = ITF entry
- PR = Protected ranking
- SR = Special ranking
- SE = Special exempt
- JE = Junior exempt
- JR = Junior Accelerator Programme entrant
- CO = College Accelerator Programme entrant
- NG = Next Gen Accelerator Program entrant
- w/o = Walkover
- r = Retired
- d = Defaulted

=== Draw ===
Quarterfinals
1	(United States) C Harrison (United States) D Hewitt	6	2	[10]
(Ukraine) A Sobolieva (Bulgaria) E Yaneva	1	6	[5]
(Japan) H Kuwata (India) A Raina	6	6
WC	(Italy) L Mair (Italy) IM Șerban	3	1
(Italy) E Chiesa (Bulgaria) R Dencheva	7^{9}	2	[10]
(Switzerland) S Bandecchi (Italy) L Pigato	6^{7}	6	[7]
(Hungary) A Nagy (Greece) S Sakellaridi	4	3
2	(United Kingdom) M Brooks (Sweden) L Zaar	6	6

Semifinals
1	(United States) C Harrison (United States) D Hewitt	6	7^{10}
(Japan) H Kuwata (India) A Raina	4	6^{8}
(Italy) E Chiesa (Bulgaria) R Dencheva	1	6	[7]
2	(United Kingdom) M Brooks (Sweden) L Zaar	6	4	[10]

Final
1	(United States) C Harrison (United States) D Hewitt	6	6
2	(United Kingdom) M Brooks (Sweden) L Zaar	4	4
