= 2026 China Open – Women's doubles =

Women's doubles
- 2026 China Open

Final
- Champions: (Canada) Gabriela Dabrowski (Brazil) Luisa Stefani
- Runners-up: (Czech Republic) Kateřina Siniaková (China) Zhang Shuai
- Score: 6–1, 6–2
- Date: 11 October 2026

Events
Singles	men	women
Doubles	men	women
- China Open

Gabriela Dabrowski and Luisa Stefani defeated Kateřina Siniaková and Zhang Shuai in the final, 6–1, 6–2 to win the women's doubles tennis title at the 2026 China Open. It was Dabrowski's 25th WTA Tour doubles title, Stefani's 18th and their seventh as a team.

Sara Errani and Jasmine Paolini were the two-time defending champions, but lost in the quarterfinals to Dabrowski and Stefani.

== Seeds ==
1. (Czech Republic) Kateřina Siniaková / (China) Zhang Shuai (final)
2. (Canada) Gabriela Dabrowski / (Brazil) Luisa Stefani (champions)
3. (Chinese Taipei) Hsieh Su-wei / (Latvia) Jeļena Ostapenko (quarterfinals)
4. (Spain) Cristina Bucșa / (United States) Nicole Melichar-Martinez (second round)
5. (Australia) Storm Hunter / (France) Kristina Mladenovic (quarterfinals)
6. (Belgium) Elise Mertens / Diana Shnaider (semifinals)
7. (Kazakhstan) Anna Danilina / (United States) Desirae Krawczyk (second round)
8. (Italy) Sara Errani / (Italy) Jasmine Paolini (quarterfinals)

== Draw ==
Key

- Q = Qualifier
- WC = Wild card
- LL = Lucky loser
- Alt = Alternate
- ITF = ITF entry
- PR = Protected ranking
- SR = Special ranking
- SE = Special exempt
- JE = Junior exempt
- JR = Junior Accelerator Programme entrant
- CO = College Accelerator Programme entrant
- NG = Next Gen Accelerator Program entrant
- w/o = Walkover
- r = Retired
- d = Defaulted

=== Finals ===
Semifinals
1	(Czech Republic) Kateřina Siniaková (China) Zhang Shuai	6	6
(New Zealand) Erin Routliffe (Indonesia) Aldila Sutjiadi	4	2
6	(Belgium) Elise Mertens; Diana Shnaider	4	6	[7]
2	(Canada) Gabriela Dabrowski (Brazil) Luisa Stefani	6	3	[10]

Final
1	(Czech Republic) Kateřina Siniaková (China) Zhang Shuai	1	2
2	(Canada) Gabriela Dabrowski (Brazil) Luisa Stefani	6	6

=== Top half ===
First round
1	(Czech Republic) K Siniaková (China) S Zhang	6	7^{7}
WC	(China) S Feng (China) Y Yuan	1	6^{4}
(United States) C McNally (Indonesia) J Tjen	2	2
(Czech Republic) N Bartůňková (Poland) M Chwalińska	6	6
M Kozyreva; V Zvonareva	1	7	[9]
(Ukraine) L Kichenok (United States) A Muhammad	6	5	[11]
(Czech Republic) M Bouzková (United States) A Li	5	5
5	(Australia) S Hunter (France) K Mladenovic	7	7
3	(Chinese Taipei) S-w Hsieh (Latvia) J Ostapenko	6	1	[10]
WC	(China) X Jiang (China) Xiy Wang	1	6	[4]
I Khromacheva; L Samsonova	7	6
(Czech Republic) J Malečková (Czech Republic) M Škoch	5	4
(New Zealand) E Routliffe (Indonesia) A Sutjiadi	6	7^{7}
(Estonia) I Neel (Mexico) G Olmos	4	6^{5}
(Japan) S Aoyama (Chinese Taipei) E-s Liang	3	3
7	(Kazakhstan) A Danilina (United States) D Krawczyk	6	6

Second round
1	(Czech Republic) K Siniaková (China) S Zhang	6	6
(Czech Republic) N Bartůňková (Poland) M Chwalińska	2	1
(Ukraine) L Kichenok (United States) A Muhammad	3	3
5	(Australia) S Hunter (France) K Mladenovic	6	6
3	(Chinese Taipei) S-w Hsieh (Latvia) J Ostapenko	6	6
I Khromacheva; L Samsonova	3	2
(New Zealand) E Routliffe (Indonesia) A Sutjiadi	6	6
7	(Kazakhstan) A Danilina (United States) D Krawczyk	4	4

Quarterfinals
1	(Czech Republic) K Siniaková (China) S Zhang	6	6
5	(Australia) S Hunter (France) K Mladenovic	2	2
3	(Chinese Taipei) S-w Hsieh (Latvia) J Ostapenko	6^{5}	6	[7]
(New Zealand) E Routliffe (Indonesia) A Sutjiadi	7^{7}	4	[10]

Semifinals
1	(Czech Republic) K Siniaková (China) S Zhang	6	6
(New Zealand) E Routliffe (Indonesia) A Sutjiadi	4	2

=== Bottom half ===
First round
6	(Belgium) E Mertens; D Shnaider	6	6
(United Kingdom) M Lumsden; A Panova	0	4
(Chinese Taipei) H-c Chan (Japan) M Kato	5	2
(Slovakia) T Mihalíková (United Kingdom) O Nicholls	7	6
Alt	(Turkey) Z Sönmez (Croatia) D Vekić	4	2
(Australia) E Perez (Netherlands) D Schuurs	6	6
E Alexandrova (Hungary) F Stollár	6	6^{5}	[10]
4	(Spain) C Bucșa (United States) N Melichar-Martinez	4	7^{7}	[12]
8	(Italy) S Errani (Italy) J Paolini	6	6
(Czech Republic) A Dețiuc (Chinese Taipei) F-h Wu	2	4
Alt	(United Kingdom) K Boulter (Ukraine) D Yastremska	6	6
(Australia) M Joint (Slovenia) A Klepač	2	2
(Czech Republic) L Nosková (Denmark) C Tauson	6^{6}	2
(Norway) U Eikeri (United States) Q Gleason	7^{8}	6
(China) Q Tang (China) Y Xu	4	4
2	(Canada) G Dabrowski (Brazil) L Stefani	6	6

Second round
6	(Belgium) E Mertens; D Shnaider	6	6
(Slovakia) T Mihalíková (United Kingdom) O Nicholls	1	3
(Australia) E Perez (Netherlands) D Schuurs	7^{7}	1	[10]
4	(Spain) C Bucșa (United States) N Melichar-Martinez	6^{3}	6	[8]
8	(Italy) S Errani (Italy) J Paolini	7	6
Alt	(United Kingdom) K Boulter (Ukraine) D Yastremska	5	1
(Norway) U Eikeri (United States) Q Gleason	3	4
2	(Canada) G Dabrowski (Brazil) L Stefani	6	6

Quarterfinals
6	(Belgium) E Mertens; D Shnaider	6	6
(Australia) E Perez (Netherlands) D Schuurs	2	1
8	(Italy) S Errani (Italy) J Paolini	5	6^{6}
2	(Canada) G Dabrowski (Brazil) L Stefani	7	7^{8}

Semifinals
6	(Belgium) E Mertens; D Shnaider	4	6	[7]
2	(Canada) G Dabrowski (Brazil) L Stefani	6	3	[10]

== Seeded teams ==
The following are the seeded teams. Seedings are based on WTA rankings as of 28 September 2026.

Country	Player	Country	Player	Rank	Seed
CZE	Kateřina Siniaková	CHN	Zhang Shuai	8	1
CAN	Gabriela Dabrowski	BRA	Luisa Stefani	8	2
TPE	Hsieh Su-wei	LAT	Jeļena Ostapenko	22	3
ESP	Cristina Bucșa	USA	Nicole Melichar-Martinez	23	4
AUS	Storm Hunter	FRA	Kristina Mladenovic	28	5
BEL	Elise Mertens		Diana Shnaider	31	6
KAZ	Anna Danilina	USA	Desirae Krawczyk	38	7
ITA	Sara Errani	ITA	Jasmine Paolini	38	8

== Other entrants ==
=== Wildcards ===
- (China) Feng Shuo / (China) Yuan Yue
- (China) Jiang Xinyu / (China) Wang Xiyu

=== Alternates ===
- (United Kingdom) Katie Boulter / (Ukraine) Dayana Yastremska
- (Turkey) Zeynep Sönmez / (Croatia) Donna Vekić

=== Withdrawals ===
- Mirra Andreeva / Anna Kalinskaya → replaced by (United Kingdom) Katie Boulter / (Ukraine) Dayana Yastremska
- (Spain) Paula Badosa / (Greece) Maria Sakkari → replaced by (Turkey) Zeynep Sönmez / (Croatia) Donna Vekić
