= 2026 Iași Open – Women's doubles =

Women's doubles
- 2026 Iași Open

Final
- Champions: (Czech Republic) Anastasia Dețiuc; Irina Khromacheva
- Runners-up: (Armenia) Alina Charaeva (Kazakhstan) Zhibek Kulambayeva
- Score: 4–6, 6–2, [10–5]
- Date: 19 July 2026

Events
Singles	men	women
Doubles	men	women
- Iași Open

Anastasia Dețiuc and Irina Khromacheva defeated Alina Charaeva and Zhibek Kulambayeva in the final, 4–6, 6–2, [10–5] to win the women's doubles tennis title at the 2026 Iași Open.

Veronika Erjavec and Panna Udvardy were the reigning champions, but Erjavec did not participate this year. Udvardy was scheduled to partner Emiliana Arango, but they withdrew due to Arango's hand injury.

== Seeds ==
1. (Belgium) Magali Kempen / Alexandra Panova (semifinals)
2. (Czech Republic) Jesika Malečková / (Czech Republic) Miriam Škoch (semifinals)
3. (Czech Republic) Anastasia Dețiuc / Irina Khromacheva (champions)
4. Maria Kozyreva / Elena Pridankina (first round)

== Draw ==
Key

- Q = Qualifier
- WC = Wild card
- LL = Lucky loser
- Alt = Alternate
- ITF = ITF entry
- PR = Protected ranking
- SR = Special ranking
- SE = Special exempt
- JE = Junior exempt
- JR = Junior Accelerator Programme entrant
- CO = College Accelerator Programme entrant
- NG = Next Gen Accelerator Program entrant
- w/o = Walkover
- r = Retired
- d = Defaulted

=== Draw ===
First round
1	(Belgium) M Kempen; A Panova	6	4	[10]
WC	(Romania) I Amariei (Romania) CA Herea	2	6	[7]
PR	(Italy) A Moratelli (Argentina) N Podoroska	6	6
(Japan) M Ayukawa (Japan) K Morisaki	1	2
4	M Kozyreva; E Pridankina	4	6	[8]
(Armenia) A Charaeva (Kazakhstan) Z Kulambayeva	6	4	[10]
Alt	(Romania) A Breaz (Romania) C Todoni	3	2
(Spain) G García Pérez; A Ibragimova	6	6
PR	(Sweden) L Zaar (Belgium) K Zimmermann	6	6
(Romania) O Gavrilă (Romania) A Prisăcariu	4	3
(Romania) M Bulgaru (Romania) MS Popa	3	0
3	(Czech Republic) A Dețiuc; I Khromacheva	6	6
(Argentina) N Fossa Huergo (Belgium) L Salden	6	7^{7}
(Japan) M Uchijima (United Kingdom) E Webley-Smith	2	6^{2}
WC	(Romania) AI Anghel (Romania) D-I Simionescu	1	2
2	(Czech Republic) J Malečková (Czech Republic) M Škoch	6	6

Quarterfinals
1	(Belgium) M Kempen; A Panova	6	6
PR	(Italy) A Moratelli (Argentina) N Podoroska	2	2
(Armenia) A Charaeva (Kazakhstan) Z Kulambayeva	6	7
(Spain) G García Pérez; A Ibragimova	2	5
PR	(Sweden) L Zaar (Belgium) K Zimmermann	5	2
3	(Czech Republic) A Dețiuc; I Khromacheva	7	6
(Argentina) N Fossa Huergo (Belgium) L Salden	3	6	[15]
2	(Czech Republic) J Malečková (Czech Republic) M Škoch	6	4	[17]

Semifinals
1	(Belgium) M Kempen; A Panova	4	6^{3}
(Armenia) A Charaeva (Kazakhstan) Z Kulambayeva	6	7^{7}
3	(Czech Republic) A Dețiuc; I Khromacheva	7	6
2	(Czech Republic) J Malečková (Czech Republic) M Škoch	5	4

Final
(Armenia) A Charaeva (Kazakhstan) Z Kulambayeva	6	2	[5]
3	(Czech Republic) A Dețiuc; I Khromacheva	4	6	[10]
