= 2026 Valle D'Aosta Ladies Open – Singles =

Singles
- 2026 Valle D'Aosta Ladies Open

Final
- Champion: (Armenia) Alina Charaeva
- Runner-up: (Germany) Noma Noha Akugue
- Score: 6–3, 6–4

Details
- Draw: 32 (4Q / 4WC)
- Seeds: 8

Events
Singles	Doubles
- Courmayeur Ladies Open

Donna Vekić was the reigning champion when the tournament was held as a WTA 250 event in 2021, but chose not to participate.

Alina Charaeva won the title, after defeating Noma Noha Akugue 6–3, 6–4 in the final.

== Seeds ==
1. (France) Anna Blinkova (semifinals)
2. (Armenia) Alina Charaeva (champion)
3. (Spain) Oksana Selekhmeteva (second round)
4. (Italy) Lucrezia Stefanini (second round)
5. (Italy) Lisa Pigato (second round)
6. (Germany) Noma Noha Akugue (final)
7. (Spain) Marina Bassols Ribera (quarterfinals)
8. (Switzerland) Susan Bandecchi (second round)

== Draw ==
Key

- Q = Qualifier
- WC = Wild card
- LL = Lucky loser
- Alt = Alternate
- ITF = ITF entry
- PR = Protected ranking
- SR = Special ranking
- SE = Special exempt
- JE = Junior exempt
- JR = Junior Accelerator Programme entrant
- CO = College Accelerator Programme entrant
- NG = Next Gen Accelerator Program entrant
- w/o = Walkover
- r = Retired
- d = Defaulted

=== Finals ===
Semifinals
1	(France) Anna Blinkova	4	3
6	(Germany) Noma Noha Akugue	6	6
(France) Elsa Jacquemot	2	6	1
2	(Armenia) Alina Charaeva	6	4	6

Final
6	(Germany) Noma Noha Akugue	3	4
2	(Armenia) Alina Charaeva	6	6

=== Top half ===
First round
1	(France) A Blinkova	6	6
(Hungary) D Gálfi	3	2
WC	(Italy) L Mair	3	4
(Ukraine) K Zavatska	6	6
(Serbia) M Ristić	3	6^{4}
(Poland) M Kubka	6	7^{7}
(United States) R Montgomery	0	6^{7}
5	(Italy) L Pigato	6	7^{9}
4	(Italy) L Stefanini	6	6
WC	(Italy) IM Șerban	3	2
(Sweden) L Zaar	4	3
(Turkey) A Aksu	6	6
Q	(Italy) G Maduzzi	4	2
(Poland) L Klimovičová	6	6
WC	(Montenegro) D Kovinić	6^{4}	1
6	(Germany) N Noha Akugue	7^{7}	6

Second round
1	(France) A Blinkova	6	4	6
(Ukraine) K Zavatska	3	6	3
(Poland) M Kubka	6	6
5	(Italy) L Pigato	2	1
4	(Italy) L Stefanini	6	4	3
(Turkey) A Aksu	2	6	6
(Poland) L Klimovičová	4	3
6	(Germany) N Noha Akugue	6	6

Quarterfinals
1	(France) A Blinkova	6	6
(Poland) M Kubka	3	2
(Turkey) A Aksu	4	1
6	(Germany) N Noha Akugue	6	6

Semifinals
1	(France) A Blinkova	4	3
6	(Germany) N Noha Akugue	6	6

=== Bottom half ===
First round
8	(Switzerland) S Bandecchi	6	6
(Ukraine) A Sobolieva	3	2
(France) E Jacquemot	2	7	7
(Germany) C Werner	6	5	5
WC	(Italy) J Pieri	2	2
(Bulgaria) E Yaneva	6	6
Q	(Hungary) A Nagy	4	2
3	(Spain) O Selekhmeteva	6	6
7	(Spain) M Bassols Ribera	6	6
(Andorra) V Jiménez Kasintseva	3	3
Q	(Ukraine) Y Kotliar	6^{2}	2
E Andreeva	7^{7}	6
(Bulgaria) R Dencheva	5	6	0
(Czech Republic) G Knutson	7	3	6
Q	(Italy) E Chiesa	4	1
2	(Armenia) A Charaeva	6	6

Second round
8	(Switzerland) S Bandecchi	7^{7}	2	3
(France) E Jacquemot	6^{3}	6	6
(Bulgaria) E Yaneva	6	3	6
3	(Spain) O Selekhmeteva	3	6	3
7	(Spain) M Bassols Ribera	6	7^{9}
E Andreeva	4	6^{7}
(Czech Republic) G Knutson	6	2	3
2	(Armenia) A Charaeva	1	6	6

Quarterfinals
(France) E Jacquemot	5	7^{7}	6
(Bulgaria) E Yaneva	7	6^{4}	1
7	(Spain) M Bassols Ribera	4	4
2	(Armenia) A Charaeva	6	6

Semifinals
(France) E Jacquemot	2	6	1
2	(Armenia) A Charaeva	6	4	6

== Qualifying ==
=== Seeds ===
1. (China) Li Zongyu (qualifying competition)
2. (Ukraine) Yelyzaveta Kotliar (qualified)
3. (Hungary) Adrienn Nagy (qualified)
4. (Greece) Sapfo Sakellaridi (qualifying competition)
5. (Ukraine) Daria Yesypchuk (qualifying competition)
6. (Italy) Gaia Maduzzi (qualified)
7. (Italy) Enola Chiesa (qualified)
8. (Slovenia) Alja Senica (qualifying competition)

=== Qualifiers ===
1. (Italy) Gaia Maduzzi
2. (Ukraine) Yelyzaveta Kotliar
3. (Hungary) Adrienn Nagy
4. (Italy) Enola Chiesa

=== Draw ===
==== First qualifier ====
First round				Qualifying competition
				1	(China) Li Zongyu	5	2
				6/WC	(Italy) Gaia Maduzzi	7	6
WC	(Italy) Finja Matuella	1	1	6/WC	(Italy) Gaia Maduzzi	7	6
6/WC	(Italy) Gaia Maduzzi	6	6

==== Second qualifier ====
First round					Qualifying competition
					2	(Ukraine) Yelyzaveta Kotliar	6	7^{7}
					8	(Slovenia) Alja Senica	4	6^{3}
	(Germany) Tayisiya Morderger	6^{4}	6	6^{8}	8	(Slovenia) Alja Senica	4	6^{3}
8	(Slovenia) Alja Senica	7^{7}	0	7^{10}

==== Third qualifier ====
First round	Qualifying competition
	3	(Hungary) Adrienn Nagy	6^{2}	7	6
	5	(Ukraine) Daria Yesypchuk	7^{7}	5	4

==== Fourth qualifier ====
First round				Qualifying competition
				4	(Greece) Sapfo Sakellaridi	2	6	3
				7	(Italy) Enola Chiesa	6	3	6
	(Germany) Yana Morderger	5	2	7	(Italy) Enola Chiesa	6	3	6
7	(Italy) Enola Chiesa	7	6
