= 2026 China Open (tennis) =

- Date: 30 September – 11 October (WTA); 30 September – 6 October (ATP)
- Edition: 25th (ATP) / 27th (WTA)
- Category: WTA 1000 (women); ATP 500 (men)
- Prize money: $4,089,385 (ATP) $9,415,725 (WTA)
- Surface: Hard
- Location: Beijing, China
- Venue: National Tennis Center

Champions

Men's singles
- (Serbia) Novak Djokovic

Women's singles
- (China) Zheng Qinwen

Men's doubles
- (United Kingdom) Julian Cash / (United Kingdom) Lloyd Glasspool

Women's doubles
- (Canada) Gabriela Dabrowski / (Brazil) Luisa Stefani
- China Open (tennis)

The 2026 China Open was a professional tennis tournament played on outdoor hardcourts. It was the 25th edition of the China Open for men and the 27th for women. The tournament is categorized as a WTA 1000 event on the 2026 WTA Tour and an ATP 500 event on the 2026 ATP Tour. Both the women's and the men's tournaments were held at the National Tennis Center in Beijing, from 30 September to 11 October and from 30 September to 6 October, respectively.

== Point distribution ==
Event	W	F	SF	QF	Round of 16	Round of 32	Round of 64	Round of 128	Q	Q2	Q1
Men's singles	500	330	200	100	50	0	—N/a	—N/a	25	13	0
Men's doubles	500	300	180	90	0	—N/a	—N/a	—N/a	45	25	0
Women's singles	1,000	650	390	215	120	65	35	10	30	20	2
Women's doubles	1,000	650	390	215	120	10	—N/a	—N/a	—N/a	—N/a	—N/a

=== Prize money ===
Event	W	F	SF	QF	Round of 16	Round of 32	Round of 64	Round of 128	Q2	Q1
Men's singles	$764,750	$411,480	$219,295	$112,035	$59,805	$31,895	—N/a	—N/a	$16,345	$9,175
Men's doubles	$251,200	$133,970	$67,780	$33,900	$17,540	—N/a	—N/a	—N/a	$0	$0
Women's singles	$1,151,380	$612,340	$340,190	$193,645	$105,720	$61,865	$36,110	$24,335	$14,130	$7,330
Women's doubles	$468,200	$247,870	$133,110	$66,570	$35,700	$19,510	—N/a	—N/a	—N/a	—N/a

== Champions ==
=== Men's singles ===
- (Serbia) Novak Djokovic def. (Australia) Alex de Minaur, 7–6^{(7–3)}, 0–1 ret.

=== Women's singles ===
- (China) Zheng Qinwen def. Mirra Andreeva 7–5, 6–4

=== Men's doubles ===
- (United Kingdom) Julian Cash / (United Kingdom) Lloyd Glasspool def. (Netherlands) Sander Arends / (Netherlands) David Pel, 6–3, 3–6, [10–6]

=== Women's doubles ===
- (Canada) Gabriela Dabrowski / (Brazil) Luisa Stefani def. (Czech Republic) Kateřina Siniaková / (China) Zhang Shuai 6–1, 6–2

== ATP singles main-draw entrants ==
=== Seeds ===
Country	Player	Rank^{1}	Seed
GER	Alexander Zverev	2	1
CAN	Félix Auger-Aliassime	5	2
	Daniil Medvedev	6	3
ITA	Flavio Cobolli	7	4
AUS	Alex de Minaur	9	5
SRB	Novak Djokovic	12	6
USA	Learner Tien	13	7
CZE	Jakub Menšík	15	8

- ^{1} Rankings are as of 21 September 2026

=== Other entrants ===
The following players received wildcards into the singles main draw:

- (China) Bu Yunchaokete
- (China) Shang Juncheng
- (United States) Learner Tien
- (China) Zhang Zhizhen

The following player used a special exempt into the singles main draw:

- Roman Safiullin

The following players received entry from the qualifying draw:

- (Spain) Pablo Carreño Busta
- (France) Arthur Géa
- (Slovakia) Alex Molčan
- (Netherlands) Botic van de Zandschulp

The following player received entry as a lucky loser:

- (Czech Republic) Tomáš Macháč

=== Withdrawals ===
- (Belgium) Raphaël Collignon → replaced by (Argentina) Sebastián Báez
- (France) Arthur Rinderknech → replaced by (Czech Republic) Tomáš Macháč
- (Italy) Jannik Sinner → replaced by (France) Quentin Halys

== ATP doubles main-draw entrants ==
=== Seeds ===
Country	Player	Country	Player	Rank^{1}	Seed
ARG	Guido Andreozzi	FRA	Manuel Guinard	27	1
GBR	Julian Cash	GBR	Lloyd Glasspool	30	2
BRA	Orlando Luz	BRA	Rafael Matos	35	3
FRA	Sadio Doumbia	FRA	Fabien Reboul	45	4

- Rankings are as of 21 September 2026

=== Other entrants ===
The following pairs received wildcards into the doubles main draw:

- (Kazakhstan) Alexander Bublik / (China) Shang Juncheng
- (China) Zhang Zhizhen / (China) Zhou Yi

The following pair received entry from the qualifying draw:

- (Argentina) Máximo González / (Argentina) Andrés Molteni
