= 2021 Courmayeur Ladies Open – Doubles =

Doubles
- 2021 Courmayeur Ladies Open

Final
- Champions: (China) Wang Xinyu (China) Zheng Saisai
- Runners-up: (Japan) Eri Hozumi (China) Zhang Shuai
- Score: 6–4, 3–6, [10–5]

Details
- Draw: 16 (2WC)
- Seeds: 4

Events
Singles	Doubles
- Courmayeur Ladies Open

This was the first edition of the tournament.

Wang Xinyu and Zheng Saisai won the title, defeating Eri Hozumi and Zhang Shuai in the final, 6–4, 3–6, [10–5].

== Seeds ==
1. (Czech Republic) Marie Bouzková / (Czech Republic) Lucie Hradecká (first round)
2. (Ukraine) Nadiia Kichenok / (Romania) Raluca Olaru (first round)
3. (Japan) Eri Hozumi / (China) Zhang Shuai (final)
4. (France) Elixane Lechemia / (United States) Sabrina Santamaria (semifinals)

== Draw ==
Key

- Q = Qualifier
- WC = Wild card
- LL = Lucky loser
- Alt = Alternate
- ITF = ITF entry
- PR = Protected ranking
- SR = Special ranking
- SE = Special exempt
- JE = Junior exempt
- JR = Junior Accelerator Programme entrant
- CO = College Accelerator Programme entrant
- NG = Next Gen Accelerator Program entrant
- w/o = Walkover
- r = Retired
- d = Defaulted

=== Draw ===
First round
1	(Czech Republic) M Bouzková (Czech Republic) L Hradecká	6	5	[5]
(Poland) K Piter (Czech Republic) R Voráčová	3	7	[10]
(China) Xin Wang (China) S Zheng	5	6	[11]
Alt	(Russia) N Vikhlyantseva (China) Q Zheng	7	4	[9]
4	(France) E Lechemia (United States) S Santamaria	6	6
(Germany) V Heisen (Belgium) K Zimmermann	4	0
(United States) E Bektas (United Kingdom) T Moore	6^{7}	6^{6}
(Spain) A Bolsova (Russia) K Rakhimova	7^{9}	7^{8}
WC	(Italy) G Gatto-Monticone (Italy) L Pigato	3	6	[6]
(Georgia (country)) O Kalashnikova (Japan) M Kato	6	3	[10]
(India) A Raina (Netherlands) R van der Hoek	3	1^{r}
3	(Japan) E Hozumi (China) S Zhang	6	1
WC	(Italy) L Bronzetti (Italy) M Caregaro	3	3
(Russia) V Diatchenko (Russia) A Panova	6	6
(United States) I Neel (Poland) A Rosolska	4	6	[10]
2	(Ukraine) N Kichenok (Romania) R Olaru	6	3	[8]

Quarterfinals
(Poland) K Piter (Czech Republic) R Voráčová	6	2	[10]
(China) Xin Wang (China) S Zheng	4	6	[12]
4	(France) E Lechemia (United States) S Santamaria	6	5	[10]
(Spain) A Bolsova (Russia) K Rakhimova	1	7	[7]
(Georgia (country)) O Kalashnikova (Japan) M Kato	0	3
3	(Japan) E Hozumi (China) S Zhang	6	6
(Russia) V Diatchenko (Russia) A Panova	1	6	[15]
(United States) I Neel (Poland) A Rosolska	6	1	[13]

Semifinals
(China) Xin Wang (China) S Zheng	6	6
4	(France) E Lechemia (United States) S Santamaria	3	2
3	(Japan) E Hozumi (China) S Zhang	6	6
(Russia) V Diatchenko (Russia) A Panova	3	4

Final
(China) Xin Wang (China) S Zheng	6	3	[10]
3	(Japan) E Hozumi (China) S Zhang	4	6	[5]
