= 2026 China Open – Men's doubles =

Men's doubles
- 2026 China Open

Final
- Champions: (United Kingdom) Julian Cash (United Kingdom) Lloyd Glasspool
- Runners-up: (Netherlands) Sander Arends (Netherlands) David Pel
- Score: 6–3, 3–6, [10–6]

Details
- Draw: 16
- Seeds: 4

Events
Singles	men	women
Doubles	men	women
- China Open

Julian Cash and Lloyd Glasspool defeated Sander Arends and David Pel in the final, 6–3, 3–6, [10–6] to win the men's doubles tennis title at the 2026 China Open.

Harri Heliövaara and Henry Patten were the defending champions, but chose not to participate this year.

== Seeds ==
1. (Argentina) Guido Andreozzi / (France) Manuel Guinard (first round)
2. (United Kingdom) Julian Cash / (United Kingdom) Lloyd Glasspool (champions)
3. (Brazil) Orlando Luz / (Brazil) Rafael Matos (first round)
4. (France) Sadio Doumbia / (France) Fabien Reboul (first round, retired)

== Draw ==
Key

- Q = Qualifier
- WC = Wild card
- LL = Lucky loser
- Alt = Alternate
- ITF = ITF entry
- PR = Protected ranking
- SR = Special ranking
- SE = Special exempt
- JE = Junior exempt
- JR = Junior Accelerator Programme entrant
- CO = College Accelerator Programme entrant
- NG = Next Gen Accelerator Program entrant
- w/o = Walkover
- r = Retired
- d = Defaulted

First round
1	(Argentina) G Andreozzi (France) M Guinard	3	4
(Netherlands) S Arends (Netherlands) D Pel	6	6
WC	(China) Z Zhang (China) Y Zhou	6^{4}	6	[10]
(Germany) J Schnaitter (Germany) M Wallner	7^{7}	4	[5]
4	(France) S Doumbia (France) F Reboul	6	4	[7]^{r}
Q	(Argentina) M González (Argentina) A Molteni	3	6	[4]
WC	(Kazakhstan) A Bublik (China) J Shang	3	6	[10]
(Argentina) F Cerúndolo (France) A Rinderknech	6	4	[7]
(Portugal) F Cabral (United States) JJ Tracy	3	6	[10]
(Peru) I Buse (Italy) F Cobolli	6	4	[5]
(United States) R Cash (Austria) A Erler	7^{8}	7^{12}
3	(Brazil) O Luz (Brazil) R Matos	6^{6}	6^{10}
(Brazil) M Melo (Germany) A Zverev	6	7
(Germany) C Frantzen (Netherlands) R Haase	2	5
K Khachanov; A Rublev	3	4
2	(United Kingdom) J Cash (United Kingdom) L Glasspool	6	6

Quarterfinals
(Netherlands) S Arends (Netherlands) D Pel	6	6
WC	(China) Z Zhang (China) Y Zhou	2	3
Q	(Argentina) M González (Argentina) A Molteni	5	6	[8]
WC	(Kazakhstan) A Bublik (China) J Shang	7	4	[10]
(Portugal) F Cabral (United States) JJ Tracy	6	4	[8]
(United States) R Cash (Austria) A Erler	3	6	[10]
(Brazil) M Melo (Germany) A Zverev	2	4
2	(United Kingdom) J Cash (United Kingdom) L Glasspool	6	6

Semifinals
(Netherlands) S Arends (Netherlands) D Pel	6	6
WC	(Kazakhstan) A Bublik (China) J Shang	4	4
(United States) R Cash (Austria) A Erler	1	6^{2}
2	(United Kingdom) J Cash (United Kingdom) L Glasspool	6	7^{7}

Final
(Netherlands) S Arends (Netherlands) D Pel	3	6	[6]
2	(United Kingdom) J Cash (United Kingdom) L Glasspool	6	3	[10]

== Qualifying ==
=== Seeds ===
1. (Belgium) Sander Gillé / (Netherlands) Sem Verbeek (qualifying competition)
2. (Argentina) Máximo González / (Argentina) Andrés Molteni (qualified)

=== Qualifiers ===
1. (Argentina) Máximo González / (Argentina) Andrés Molteni

=== Qualifying draw ===
First round
1	(Belgium) Sander Gillé (Netherlands) Sem Verbeek	6^{4}	6	[10]
(New Zealand) Finn Reynolds (New Zealand) James Watt	7^{7}	3	[4]
WC	(China) Cui Jie (China) Te Rigele	6	4	[7]
2	(Argentina) Máximo González (Argentina) Andrés Molteni	2	6	[10]

Qualifying competition
1	(Belgium) Sander Gillé (Netherlands) Sem Verbeek	7^{7}	6^{5}	[4]
2	(Argentina) Máximo González (Argentina) Andrés Molteni	6^{3}	7^{7}	[10]
