= 2026 Iași Open – Men's doubles =

Men's doubles
- 2026 Iași Open

Final
- Champions: (Sweden) Erik Grevelius (Sweden) Adam Heinonen
- Runners-up: (Serbia) Ivan Sabanov (Serbia) Matej Sabanov
- Score: 6–4, 6–2

Events
Singles	men	women
Doubles	men	women
- Iași Open

Szymon Kielan and Filip Pieczonka were the defending champions but only Kielan chose to defend his title, partnering David Poljak. They lost in the first round to Karol Drzewiecki and Piotr Matuszewski.

Erik Grevelius and Adam Heinonen won the title after defeating Ivan and Matej Sabanov 6–4, 6–2 in the final.

== Seeds ==
1. (India) Siddhant Banthia / (Bulgaria) Alexander Donski (semifinals)
2. (Poland) Karol Drzewiecki / (Poland) Piotr Matuszewski (quarterfinals)
3. (Germany) Tim Rühl / (Netherlands) Mick Veldheer (first round)
4. (Romania) Alexandru Jecan / (Romania) Bogdan Pavel (semifinals)

== Draw ==
Key

- Q = Qualifier
- WC = Wild card
- LL = Lucky loser
- Alt = Alternate
- ITF = ITF entry
- PR = Protected ranking
- SR = Special ranking
- SE = Special exempt
- JE = Junior exempt
- JR = Junior Accelerator Programme entrant
- CO = College Accelerator Programme entrant
- NG = Next Gen Accelerator Program entrant
- w/o = Walkover
- r = Retired
- d = Defaulted

First round
1	(India) S Banthia (Bulgaria) A Donski	7	6
(Spain) Í Cervantes (Ukraine) D Molchanov	5	3
(Moldova) R Albot (Romania) V Cornea	6	6^{5}	[10]
(Spain) S Martos Gornés (Poland) S Walków	2	7^{7}	[3]
3	(Germany) T Rühl (Netherlands) M Veldheer	5	6	[11]
WC	(Romania) Gabriel Ghețu (Romania) Ștefan Horia Haita	7	2	[13]
(India) A Kadhe (Brazil) M Zormann	4	6	[7]
(Sweden) E Grevelius (Sweden) A Heinonen	6	4	[10]
(India) SDP Dev (India) Nitin Kumar Sinha	4	3
WC	(Romania) C Crețu (Romania) Ștefan Paloși	6	6
(India) VS Prashanth (India) R Ramanathan	6^{4}	6^{1}
4	(Romania) A Jecan (Romania) B Pavel	7^{7}	7^{7}
(Czech Republic) Z Kolář (Austria) M Neuchrist	4	6	[8]
(Serbia) I Sabanov (Serbia) M Sabanov	6	3	[10]
(Poland) S Kielan (Czech Republic) D Poljak	4	6^{4}
2	(Poland) K Drzewiecki (Poland) P Matuszewski	6	7^{7}

Quarterfinals
1	(India) S Banthia (Bulgaria) A Donski	6	6
(Moldova) R Albot (Romania) V Cornea	3	4
WC	(Romania) G Ghețu (Romania) ȘH Haita	5	3
(Sweden) E Grevelius (Sweden) A Heinonen	7	6
WC	(Romania) C Crețu (Romania) Ș Paloși	6	3	[5]
4	(Romania) A Jecan (Romania) B Pavel	4	6	[10]
(Serbia) I Sabanov (Serbia) M Sabanov	2	6	[11]
2	(Poland) K Drzewiecki (Poland) P Matuszewski	6	3	[9]

Semifinals
1	(India) S Banthia (Bulgaria) A Donski	5	2
(Sweden) E Grevelius (Sweden) A Heinonen	7	6
4	(Romania) A Jecan (Romania) B Pavel	7^{9}	1	[1]
(Serbia) I Sabanov (Serbia) M Sabanov	6^{7}	6	[10]

Final
(Sweden) E Grevelius (Sweden) A Heinonen	6	6
(Serbia) I Sabanov (Serbia) M Sabanov	4	2
