= 2026 Iași Open – Men's singles =

Men's singles
- 2026 Iași Open

Final
- Champion: (Hungary) Zsombor Piros
- Runner-up: (France) Titouan Droguet
- Score: 6–1, 7–6^{(7–2)}

Events
Singles	men	women
Doubles	men	women
- Iași Open

Elmer Møller was the defending champion but chose not to defend his title.

Zsombor Piros won the title after defeating Titouan Droguet 6–1, 7–6^{(7–2)} in the final.

== Seeds ==
1. (France) Valentin Royer (semifinals)
2. (Croatia) Dino Prižmić (withdrew)
3. (Bosnia and Herzegovina) Damir Džumhur (second round)
4. (France) Titouan Droguet (final)
5. (Spain) Pedro Martínez (second round)
6. (Chile) Tomás Barrios Vera (first round)
7. (Brazil) Gustavo Heide (quarterfinals)
8. (Czech Republic) Zdeněk Kolář (second round)

== Draw ==
Key

- Q = Qualifier
- WC = Wild card
- LL = Lucky loser
- Alt = Alternate
- ITF = ITF entry
- PR = Protected ranking
- SR = Special ranking
- SE = Special exempt
- JE = Junior exempt
- JR = Junior Accelerator Programme entrant
- CO = College Accelerator Programme entrant
- NG = Next Gen Accelerator Program entrant
- w/o = Walkover
- r = Retired
- d = Defaulted

=== Finals ===
Semifinals
1	(France) Valentin Royer	3	4
4	(France) Titouan Droguet	6	6
(Hungary) Zsombor Piros	7^{7}	6
(Switzerland) Jérôme Kym	6^{5}	3

Final
4	(France) Titouan Droguet	1	6^{2}
(Hungary) Zsombor Piros	6	7^{7}

=== Top half ===
First round
1	(France) V Royer	6	6
LL	(Austria) M Neuchrist	2	3
Q	(Algeria) Samir Hamza Reguig	4	1
Q	(Sweden) O Wallin	6	6
(Argentina) GA Olivieri	0	4
(Japan) T Daniel	6	6
WC	(Romania) Ștefan Paloși	5	0
8	(Czech Republic) Z Kolář	7	6
4	(France) T Droguet	7^{7}	6
Q	(France) Mathys Erhard	6^{5}	4
(Portugal) F Ferreira Silva	6	3	4
(France) L Pavlovic	2	6	6
LL	(Spain) Àlex Martí Pujolràs	1	4
Alt	(Romania) C Crețu	6	6
LL	(Czech Republic) D Poljak	4	6^{4}
7	(Brazil) G Heide	6	7^{7}

Second round
1	(France) V Royer	3	7^{7}	6
Q	(Sweden) O Wallin	6	6^{3}	4
(Japan) T Daniel	6	6
8	(Czech Republic) Z Kolář	4	3
4	(France) T Droguet	6	7^{7}
(France) L Pavlovic	3	6^{3}
Alt	(Romania) C Crețu	6	5	3
7	(Brazil) G Heide	2	7	6

Quarterfinals
1	(France) V Royer	4	6	6
(Japan) T Daniel	6	2	2
4	(France) T Droguet	6	6
7	(Brazil) G Heide	1	3

Semifinals
1	(France) V Royer	3	4
4	(France) T Droguet	6	6

=== Bottom half ===
First round
6	(Chile) T Barrios Vera	6	5	6^{7}
Alt	I Simakin	4	7	7^{9}
WC	(Romania) Radu Mihai Papoe	2	2
(Argentina) L Midón	6	6
(Hungary) Z Piros	6	6
WC	(Romania) Gabriel Ghețu	0	3
Q	(Romania) Ștefan Horia Haita	1	1
3	(Bosnia and Herzegovina) D Džumhur	6	6
5	(Spain) P Martínez	6	4	6
Q	(India) SDP Dev	3	6	2
Alt	(Poland) M Kaśnikowski	6	3	7
(Italy) F Cinà	4	6	5
(Switzerland) J Kym	6	2	6
NG	(France) T Faurel	0	6	2
(France) S Gueymard Wayenburg	7^{7}	4	6
Q	(Bulgaria) A Donski	6^{4}	6	3

Second round
Alt	I Simakin	5	3
(Argentina) L Midón	7	6
(Hungary) Z Piros	4	6	6
3	(Bosnia and Herzegovina) D Džumhur	6	4	3
5	(Spain) P Martínez	6	3	5
Alt	(Poland) M Kaśnikowski	4	6	7
(Switzerland) J Kym	7^{7}	7
(France) S Gueymard Wayenburg	6^{1}	5

Quarterfinals
(Argentina) L Midón	2	6^{3}
(Hungary) Z Piros	6	7^{7}
Alt	(Poland) M Kaśnikowski	6	0	3
(Switzerland) J Kym	4	6	6

Semifinals
(Hungary) Z Piros	7^{7}	6
(Switzerland) J Kym	6^{5}	3
