= 2026 China Open – Men's singles =

Men's singles
- 2026 China Open

Final
- Champion: (Serbia) Novak Djokovic
- Runner-up: (Australia) Alex de Minaur
- Score: 7–6^{(7–3)}, 0–1 ret.

Details
- Draw: 32 (4Q / 3WC)
- Seeds: 8

Events
Singles	men	women
Doubles	men	women
- China Open

Novak Djokovic won the men's singles tennis title at the 2026 China Open after Alex de Minaur retired in the final, with the score at 7–6^{(7–3)}, 0–1. It was his seventh China Open title, 102nd ATP Tour title overall and his record-extending 73rd hardcourt title. With his win, Djokovic marked his 21st consecutive season winning at least one title, equalling the record held by Rod Laver and Ken Rosewall, and at age 39 was the oldest tour-level winner since Rosewall in 1977 (aged 43). He extended his win–loss record at the China Open to 34–0, breaking Rafael Nadal's record (of 31 consecutive initial wins at the French Open) for the best start to a tour-level event in the Open Era.

Jannik Sinner was the reigning champion, but withdrew from the tournament due to an ongoing knee injury.

Third seed Daniil Medvedev was defaulted from the tournament in his semifinal match against Djokovic with the score at 5–7, 3–5, after he hit a ball into the audience and struck a spectator.

== Seeds ==
1. (Germany) Alexander Zverev (quarterfinals)
2. (Canada) Félix Auger-Aliassime (first round)
3. Daniil Medvedev (semifinals, defaulted)
4. (Italy) Flavio Cobolli (first round)
5. (Australia) Alex de Minaur (final, retired)
6. (Serbia) Novak Djokovic (champion)
7. (United States) Learner Tien (first round)
8. (Czech Republic) Jakub Menšík (second round)

== Draw ==
Key

- Q = Qualifier
- WC = Wild card
- LL = Lucky loser
- Alt = Alternate
- ITF = ITF entry
- PR = Protected ranking
- SR = Special ranking
- SE = Special exempt
- JE = Junior exempt
- JR = Junior Accelerator Programme entrant
- CO = College Accelerator Programme entrant
- NG = Next Gen Accelerator Program entrant
- w/o = Walkover
- r = Retired
- d = Defaulted

=== Finals ===
Semifinals
6	(Serbia) Novak Djokovic	7	5
3	Daniil Medvedev	5	3^{d}
5	(Australia) Alex de Minaur	6	3
(Poland) Hubert Hurkacz	4	2^{r}

Final
6	(Serbia) Novak Djokovic	7^{7}	0
5	(Australia) Alex de Minaur	6^{3}	1^{r}

=== Top half ===
First round
1	(Germany) A Zverev	7^{7}	6
(United Kingdom) C Norrie	6^{1}	4
WC	(China) J Shang	5	6	7
(Argentina) S Báez	7	3	5
(Argentina) JM Cerúndolo	2	7	4
WC	(China) Y Bu	6	5	6
(Portugal) N Borges	3	6^{2}
6	(Serbia) N Djokovic	6	7^{7}
3	D Medvedev	6	6
Q	(Spain) P Carreño Busta	4	2
(Germany) J-L Struff	6	6
(Argentina) TA Tirante	1	4
Q	(Netherlands) B van de Zandschulp	7	4	3
(Argentina) F Cerúndolo	5	6	6
(Kazakhstan) A Bublik	4	6^{5}
8	(Czech Republic) J Menšík	6	7^{7}

Second round
1	(Germany) A Zverev	6	6
WC	(China) J Shang	0	3
WC	(China) Y Bu	6	6^{2}	2
6	(Serbia) N Djokovic	4	7^{7}	6
3	D Medvedev	6	6
(Germany) J-L Struff	4	3
(Argentina) F Cerúndolo	6	6
8	(Czech Republic) J Menšík	3	3

Quarterfinals
1	(Germany) A Zverev	6	4	4
6	(Serbia) N Djokovic	4	6	6
3	D Medvedev	7^{7}	6
(Argentina) F Cerúndolo	6^{4}	3

Semifinals
6	(Serbia) N Djokovic	7	5
3	D Medvedev	5	3^{d}

=== Bottom half ===
First round
5	(Australia) A de Minaur	7^{7}	6
(Argentina) M Navone	6^{4}	2
(Peru) I Buse	1	6^{3}
(France) Q Halys	6	7^{7}
(Netherlands) T Griekspoor	4	7	6^{6}
A Rublev	6	5	7^{8}
SE	R Safiullin	6	6
4	(Italy) F Cobolli	3	2
7/WC	(United States) L Tien	7	3	4
(Poland) H Hurkacz	5	6	6
WC	(China) Z Zhang	4	3
Q	(France) A Géa	6	6
Q	(Slovakia) A Molčan	6	6
LL	(Czech Republic) T Macháč	3	2
K Khachanov	6	6
2	(Canada) F Auger-Aliassime	3	3

Second round
5	(Australia) A de Minaur	3	7^{7}	7
(France) Q Halys	6	6^{5}	5
A Rublev	6	3	6
SE	R Safiullin	2	6	4
(Poland) H Hurkacz	7^{7}	6^{5}	6
Q	(France) A Géa	6^{5}	7^{7}	2
Q	(Slovakia) A Molčan	5	3
K Khachanov	7	6

Quarterfinals
5	(Australia) A de Minaur	1	6	6
A Rublev	6	2	3
(Poland) H Hurkacz	7^{7}	6
K Khachanov	6^{2}	2

Semifinals
5	(Australia) A de Minaur	6	3
(Poland) H Hurkacz	4	2^{r}

== Qualifying ==
=== Seeds ===
1. (Netherlands) Botic van de Zandschulp (qualified)
2. (Germany) Yannick Hanfmann (first round)
3. (Serbia) Miomir Kecmanović (first round)
4. (Spain) Martín Landaluce (first round)
5. (Australia) James Duckworth (withdrew)
6. (Germany) Daniel Altmaier (first round)
7. (Spain) Pablo Carreño Busta (qualified)
8. (Czech Republic) Vít Kopřiva (first round)

=== Qualifiers ===
1. (Netherlands) Botic van de Zandschulp
2. (France) Arthur Géa
3. (Spain) Pablo Carreño Busta
4. (Slovakia) Alex Molčan

=== Lucky loser ===
1. (Czech Republic) Tomáš Macháč

=== Qualifying draw ===
==== First qualifier ====
First round
1	(Netherlands) Botic van de Zandschulp	4	6	6
(France) Valentin Royer	6	2	4
WC	(China) Cui Jie	6	6
6	(Germany) Daniel Altmaier	4	1

Qualifying competition
1	(Netherlands) Botic van de Zandschulp	6	6
WC	(China) Cui Jie	4	4

==== Second qualifier ====
First round
2	(Germany) Yannick Hanfmann	6^{7}	7^{8}	4
(Czech Republic) Tomáš Macháč	7^{9}	6^{6}	6
WC	(China) Te Rigele	2	3
Alt	(France) Arthur Géa	6	6

Qualifying competition
(Czech Republic) Tomáš Macháč	3	4
Alt	(France) Arthur Géa	6	6

==== Third qualifier ====
First round
3	(Serbia) Miomir Kecmanović	6^{6}	6	6^{5}
(France) Adrian Mannarino	7^{8}	3	7^{7}
WC	(China) Zhou Yi	5	3
7	(Spain) Pablo Carreño Busta	7	6

Qualifying competition
(France) Adrian Mannarino	3	4
7	(Spain) Pablo Carreño Busta	6	6

==== Fourth qualifier ====
First round
4	(Spain) Martín Landaluce	1	7^{11}	6^{2}
(Argentina) Marco Trungelliti	6	6^{9}	7^{7}
(Slovakia) Alex Molčan	7^{7}	2	7^{10}
8	(Czech Republic) Vít Kopřiva	6^{3}	6	6^{8}

Qualifying competition
(Argentina) Marco Trungelliti	4	5
(Slovakia) Alex Molčan	6	7
