= Stephanie Wagner =

German tennis player (born 1994)

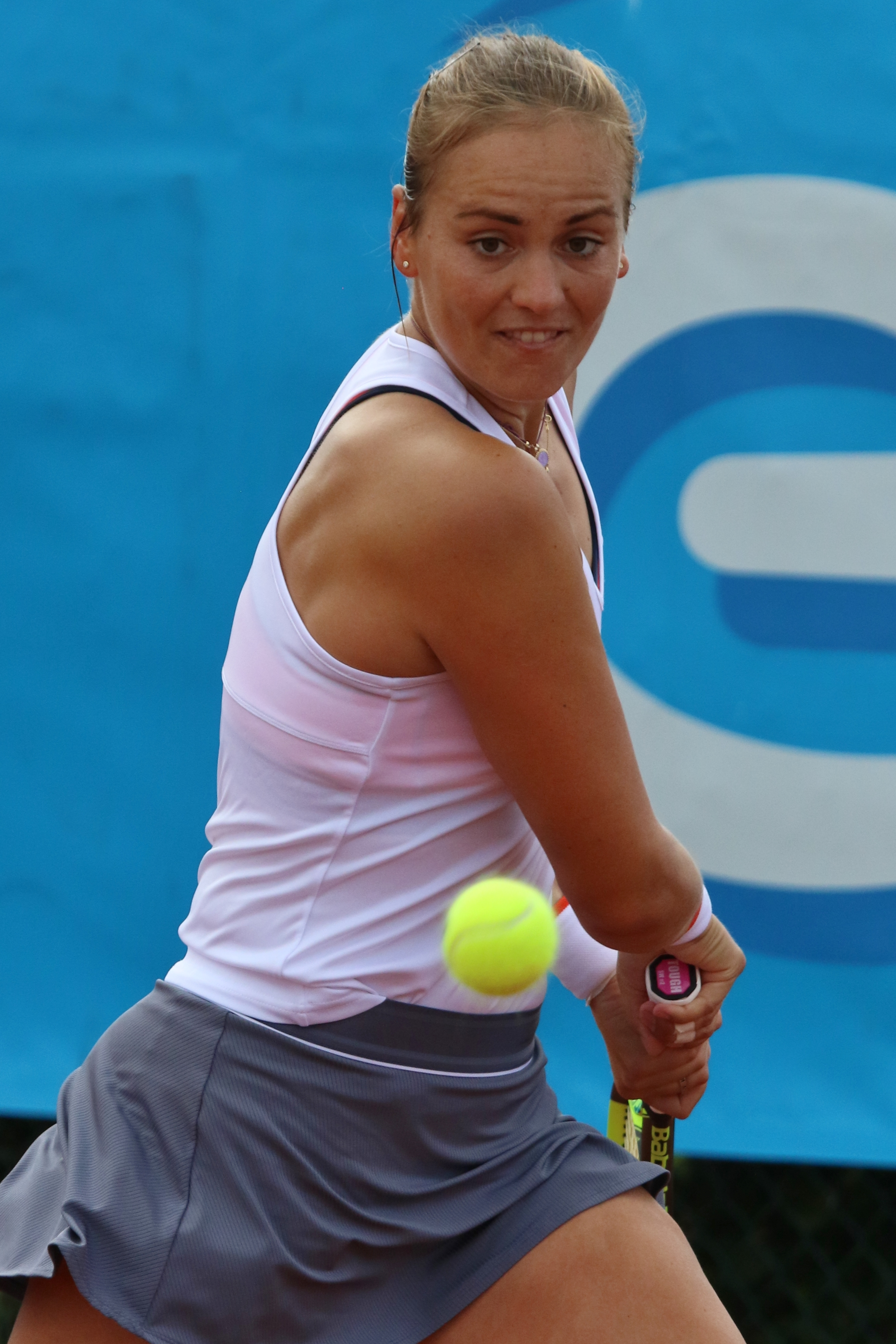
- Wagner in July 2021
- Country (sports): Germany
- Residence: Amberg, Germany
- Born: 17 September 1994 (age 31)
- Height: 1.80 m (5 ft 11 in)
- Plays: Right-handed (two-handed backhand)
- College: University of Miami
- Prize money: US $132,504

Singles
- Career record: 228–171
- Career titles: 0
- Highest ranking: No. 263 (14 September 2020)
- Current ranking: No. 623 (17 November 2025)

Grand Slam singles results
- Wimbledon: Q1 (2022)

Doubles
- Career record: 9–10
- Career titles: 1 ITF
- Highest ranking: No. 546 (25 November 2019)
- Last updated on: 19 November 2025.

Stephanie Wagner (born 17 September 1994) is a German tennis player. She has a career-high singles ranking by the Women's Tennis Association (WTA) of 263, achieved on 14 September 2020. Her best doubles ranking of world No. 546, she reached on 25 November 2019.

Wagner made her WTA Tour main-draw debut as a qualifier at the 2021 Courmayeur Ladies Open.

She played collegiate tennis for the Miami Hurricanes at the University of Miami in Coral Gables, Florida.

== ITF Circuit finals ==
=== Singles: 2 (2 runner–ups) ===
| Legend W25 tournaments (0–2) W15 tournaments (0–0) | Finals by surface Hard (0–1) Clay (0–1) |

| Result | W–L | Date | Tournament | Tier | Surface | Opponent | Score |
|---|---|---|---|---|---|---|---|
| Loss | 0–1 | Mar 2019 | ITF Kōfu, Japan | W25 | Hard | (Chinese Taipei) Lee Hua-chen | 7–6^{(7–4)}, 3–6, 4–6 |
| Loss | 0–2 | Jun 2019 | ITF Minsk, Belarus | W25 | Clay | (United Kingdom) Francesca Jones | 3–6, 6–1, 2–6 |

=== Doubles: 1 (1 title) ===
| Legend W25 tournaments (1–0) W15 tournaments (0–0) | Finals by surface Hard (0–0) Clay (1–0) |

| Result | W–L | Date | Tournament | Tier | Surface | Partner | Opponents | Score |
|---|---|---|---|---|---|---|---|---|
| Win | 1–0 | Nov 2019 | ITF Orlando, United States | W25 | Clay | (United States) Katharine Fahey | (Brazil) Carolina Alves (Mexico) Renata Zarazúa | 4–6, 6–2, [10–7] |
