= Courmayeur Ladies Open =

Tennis tournament

WTA 125
- Founded: 2021
- Location: Courmayeur; Italy
- Category: WTA 250 (2021); WTA 125 (2026–)
- Surface: Hard (Indoor)
- Draw: 32S / 11Q / 8D
- Prize money: €100,000
- Website: Official Website

Current champions (2026)
- Women's singles: (Armenia) Alina Charaeva
- Women's doubles: (United States) Catherine Harrison (United States) Dalayna Hewitt

The Courmayeur Ladies Open was a women's tennis tournament held in Courmayeur, Italy as part of the 2021 WTA Tour for one year. It was held on indoor hardcourts (on Mapei surface) during late October.

== Past finals ==
=== Singles ===
Year	Champion	Runner-up	Score
2026	(Armenia) Alina Charaeva	(Germany) Noma Noha Akugue	6–3, 6–4
↑ WTA 125 event ↑
2022–25	Not held		
2021	(Croatia) Donna Vekić	(Denmark) Clara Tauson	7–6^{(7–3)}, 6–2

=== Doubles ===
Year	Champions	Runners-up	Score
2026	(United States) Catherine Harrison (United States) Dalayna Hewitt	(United Kingdom) Madeleine Brooks (Sweden) Lisa Zaar	6–4, 6–4
↑ WTA 125 event ↑
2022–25	Not held		
2021	(China) Wang Xinyu (China) Zheng Saisai	(Japan) Eri Hozumi (China) Zhang Shuai	6–4, 3–6, [10–5]

== See also ==
- Valle d'Aosta Open
