= Alina Charaeva =

Armenian tennis player (born 2002)

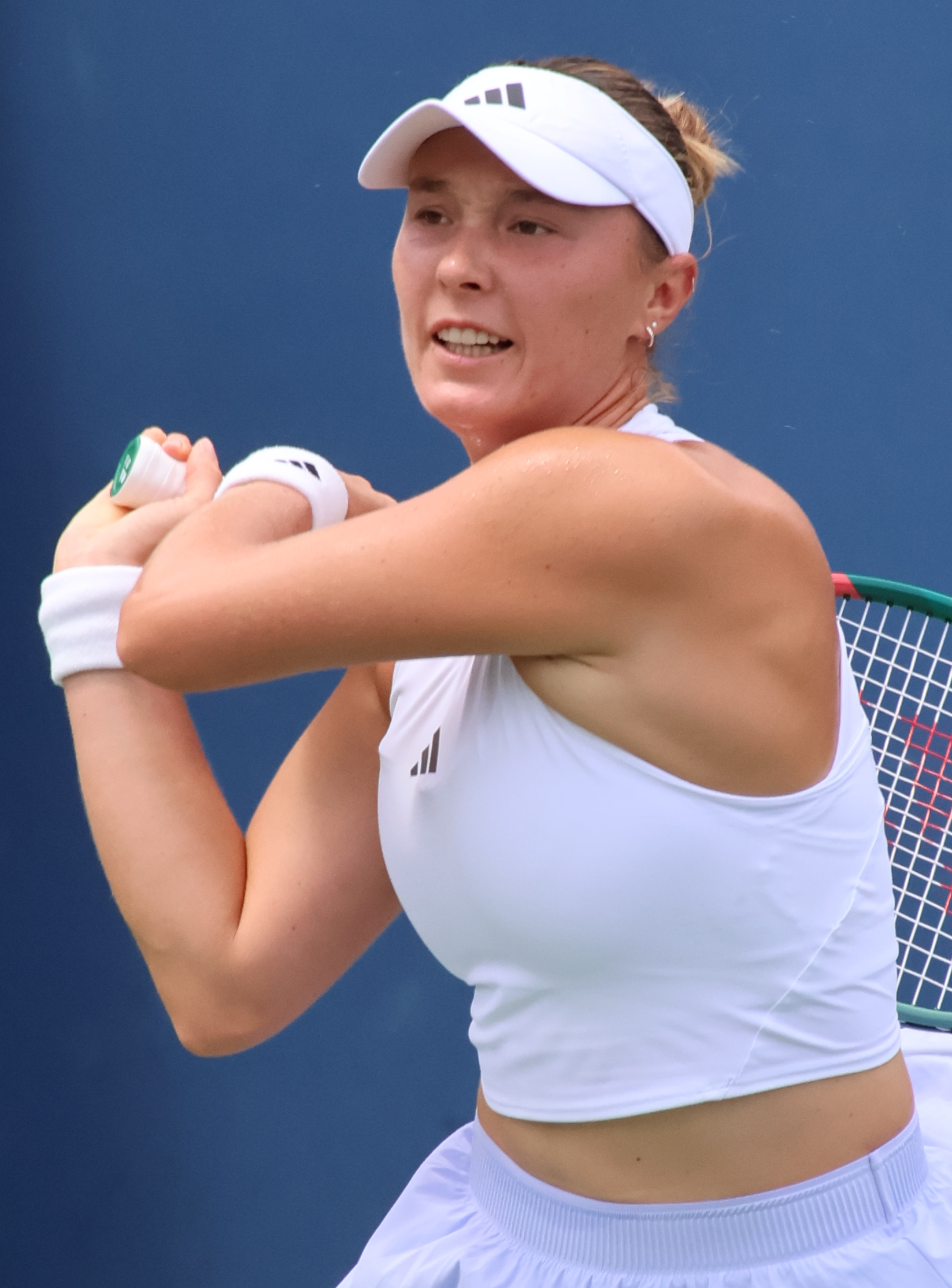
- Charaeva at the 2026 US Open
- Full name: Alina Alekseyevna Charaeva
- Native name: Алина Алексеевна Чараева
- Country (sports): Russia (2019–2026); Armenia (July 2026–)
- Residence: Barcelona, Spain
- Born: 27 May 2002 (age 24) Samara, Russia
- Height: 1.70 m (5 ft 7 in)
- Turned pro: 2018
- Plays: Right-handed
- Coach: Carlos Martinez-Comet
- Prize money: $671,727

Singles
- Career record: 227–132
- Career titles: 2 WTA 125
- Highest ranking: No. 82 (2 November 2026)
- Current ranking: No. 82 (2 November 2026)

Grand Slam singles results
- Australian Open: Q1 (2026)
- French Open: Q1 (2026)
- Wimbledon: Q3 (2026)
- US Open: Q3 (2025)

Doubles
- Career record: 73–43
- Career titles: 6 ITF
- Highest ranking: No. 203 (28 July 2025)
- Current ranking: No. 415 (2 November 2026)
- Last updated on: 2 November 2026.

Alina Alekseyevna Charaeva (Russian: Алина Алексеевна Чараева; Armenian: Ալինա Ալեքսեևնա Չարաևա; born 27 May 2002) is a Russian-born Armenian tennis player. She has a career-high singles ranking by the WTA of No. 82, achieved on 2 November 2026, and a best doubles ranking of No. 203, reached in July 2025.

Charaeva has won two WTA 125 singles titles, along with eight singles and six doubles titles on the ITF Circuit.

In July 2026, Charaeva changed her sports nationality from Russia to Armenia after gaining Armenian citizenship.

== Career ==
=== 2019–2025: WTA Tour debut ===
Charaeva made her WTA Tour debut at the 2019 Kremlin Cup, having received a wildcard entry into the doubles main-draw, partnering with Sofya Lansere.

At the 2023 WTA 125 Andorrà Open, Charaeva entered as a wildcard and defeated third seed Océane Dodin in three sets to reach the second round, where she lost to Heather Watson.

She made it through to her first WTA 125 final at the 2025 Huzhou Open, losing to Veronika Erjavec. Charaeva qualified to make her WTA Tour singles main-draw debut at the 2025 Pan Pacific Open, but lost to Jaqueline Cristian in the first round.

=== 2026: Two WTA 125 titles, win over world No. 1 ===
Charaeva won her maiden WTA 125 title at the Midland Tennis Classic, defeating Guo Hanyu in the final. Teaming up with Zhibek Kulambayeva, she reached her first WTA Tour final in doubles at the Iași Open, losing to third seeds Anastasia Dețiuc and Irina Khromacheva in a deciding champions tiebreak.

At the Hamburg Open, Charaeva recorded three-set wins over Sara Sorribes Tormo and eighth seed Sinja Kraus to make it through to her first WTA Tour quarterfinal, at which point her run was ended by fourth seed Anna Bondár.

Entering the China Open ranked at world No. 118, she defeated Yuliia Starodubtseva, world No. 1 Elena Rybakina and Sonay Kartal to reach the fourth round at a WTA 1000 tournament for the first time. At that stage her run was ended by wildcard entrant and eventual champion Zheng Qinwen. Three weeks later, Charaeva won her second WTA 125 singles title at the Courmayeur Open, overcoming Noma Noha Akugue in the final.

== Nationality change ==
On 3 July 2026, it was announced that Charaeva had obtained Armenian citizenship and would begin representing Armenia in competition.

== Performance timeline ==
Key
W	F	SF	QF	#R	RR	Q#	DNQ	A	NH

(W) winner; (F) finalist; (SF) semifinalist; (QF) quarterfinalist; (#R) rounds 4, 3, 2, 1; (RR) round-robin stage; (Q#) qualification round; (DNQ) did not qualify; (A) absent; (NH) not held; (SR) strike rate (events won / competed); (W–L) win–loss record.
To avoid confusion and double counting, these charts are updated at the conclusion of a tournament or when the player's participation has ended.

=== Singles ===
Current through the 2026 China Open.

Tournament	2025	2026	SR	W–L	Win %
Grand Slam tournaments
Australian Open	A	Q1	0 / 0	0–0	
French Open	A	Q1	0 / 0	0–0	
Wimbledon	Q2	Q3	0 / 0	0–0	
US Open	Q3	Q1	0 / 0	0–0	
Win–Loss	0–0	0–0	0 / 0	0–0	
WTA 1000 tournaments
Qatar Open	A	A	0 / 0	0–0	
Dubai Championships	A	A	0 / 0	0–0	
Indian Wells Open	A	A	0 / 0	0–0	
Miami Open	A	A	0 / 0	0–0	
Madrid Open	A	1R	0 / 1	0–1	
Italian Open	A	A	0 / 0	0–0	
Canadian Open	A	A	0 / 0	0–0	
Cincinnati Open	A	1R	0 / 1	0–1	
China Open	A	4R	0 / 1	3–1	
Wuhan Open	A	A	0 / 0	0–0	
Win–Loss	0–0	3–3	0 / 3	3–3	
Career statistics
	2025	2026	SR	W–L	Win %
Tournaments	2	8	Career total: 10		
Titles	0	0	Career total: 0		
Finals	0	0	Career total: 0		
Hard win–loss	0–2	6–4	0 / 6	6–6	
Clay win–loss	0–0	3–4	0 / 4	3–4	
Grass win–loss	0–0	0–0	0 / 0	0–0	
Overall win–loss	0–2	9–8	0 / 10	9–10	
Year-end ranking	161				

== WTA Tour finals ==
=== Doubles: 1 (runner-up) ===
Legend WTA 250 (0–1)	Finals by surface Clay (0–1)

Result	W–L	Date	Tournament	Tier	Surface	Partner	Opponents	Score
Loss	0–1	Jul 2026	Iași Open, Romania	WTA 250	Clay	(Kazakhstan) Zhibek Kulambayeva	(Czech Republic) Anastasia Dețiuc; Irina Khromacheva	6–4, 2–6, [5–10]

== WTA 125 finals ==
=== Singles: 3 (2 titles, 1 runner-up) ===
Result	W–L	Date	Tournament	Surface	Opponent	Score
Loss	0–1	Sep 2025	Huzhou Open, China	Clay	(Slovenia) Veronika Erjavec	2–6, 1–6
Win	1–1	Feb 2026	Midland Tennis Classic, US	Hard (i)	(China) Guo Hanyu	6–4, 7–6^{(7–4)}
Win	2–1	Oct 2026	Courmayeur Ladies Open, Italy	Hard (i)	(Germany) Noma Noha Akugue	6–3, 6–4

== ITF Circuit finals ==
=== Singles: 11 (8 titles, 3 runner-ups) ===
Legend
W100 tournaments
W75 tournaments
W50 tournaments
W25 tournaments
15k / W15 tournaments

Result	W–L	Date	Tournament	Tier	Surface	Opponent	Score
Win	1–0	Nov 2018	ITF Vinaròs, Spain	15k	Clay	(Spain) Júlia Payola	6–1, 6–2
Loss	1–1	Sep 2020	ITF Marbella, Spain	W25	Clay	(China) Zheng Qinwen	6–4, 4–6, 4–6
Win	2–1	Sep 2021	ITF Johannesburg, South Africa	W25	Clay	(Netherlands) Richèl Hogenkamp	2–0 ret.
Win	3–1	Nov 2022	ITF Castellon, Spain	W15	Clay	(Germany) Natalia Siedliska	7–6^{(4)}, 6–3
Win	4–1	Nov 2022	ITF Nules, Spain	W15	Clay	(Spain) Noelia Bouzó Zanotti	6–4, 6–3
Loss	4–2	Oct 2023	ITF Baza, Spain	W25	Hard	(Croatia) Lea Bošković	3–6, 2–6
Win	5–2	Nov 2023	ITF Monastir, Tunisia	W25	Hard	Maria Bondarenko	7–5, 6–3
Win	6–2	Dec 2023	ITF Monastir, Tunisia	W25	Hard	(Spain) Guiomar Maristany	6–2, 6–4
Win	7–2	Aug 2024	ITF Ourense, Spain	W50	Hard	(Japan) Haruka Kaji	7–6^{(7)}, 6–1
Loss	7–3	Oct 2024	ITF Les Franqueses del Vallès, Spain	W100	Hard	Anastasia Zakharova	3–6, 1–6
Win	8–3	May 2025	ITF Kuršumlijska Banja, Serbia	W75	Clay	(Serbia) Teodora Kostović	6–4, 7–6^{(5)}

=== Doubles: 9 (6 titles, 3 runner-ups) ===
Legend
W100 tournaments
W60 tournaments
W50 tournaments
W25/35 tournaments
W15 tournaments

Result	W–L	Date	Tournament	Tier	Surface	Partner	Opponents	Score
Win	1–0	Sep 2019	ITF Pula, Italy	W25	Clay	(Venezuela) Andrea Gámiz	(Netherlands) Eva Vedder (Netherlands) Stéphanie Visscher	7–6^{(1)}, 6–3
Win	2–0	Sep 2020	ITF Marbella, Spain	W25	Clay	(Russia) Oksana Selekhmeteva	(Romania) Miriam Bulgaru (France) Victoria Muntean	6–3, 6–2
Win	3–0	Oct 2020	ITF Platja d'Aro, Spain	W15	Clay	(Russia) Oksana Selekhmeteva	(Spain) Alba Carrillo Marín (Spain) Júlia Payola	5–7, 6–1, [10–5]
Win	4–0	Jul 2021	President's Cup, Kazakhstan	W60	Hard	(Russia) Maria Timofeeva	(Russia) Evgeniya Levashova (Brazil) Laura Pigossi	7–6^{(5)}, 2–6, [10–6]
Win	5–0	Feb 2024	Pretoria International, South Africa	W50	Hard	Ekaterina Reyngold	(South Africa) Isabella Kruger (South Africa) Zoë Kruger	6–0, 5–7, [10–3]
Loss	5–1	Jul 2024	ITF Horb am Neckar, Germany	W35	Clay	(Japan) Yuki Naito	(Czech Republic) Aneta Kučmová (Slovenia) Nika Radišić	4–6, 7–6^{(3)}, [2–10]
Loss	5–2	Oct 2024	ITF Baza, Spain	W35	Clay	(France) Nahia Berecoechea	(Germany) Tayisiya Morderger (Germany) Yana Morderger	3–6, 6–7^{(1)}
Win	6–2	Oct 2024	ITF Les Franqueses del Vallès, Spain	W100	Hard	Ekaterina Reyngold	(Germany) Mina Hodzic (Germany) Caroline Werner	6–2, 7–6^{(2)}
Loss	6–3	Mar 2025	ITF Terrassa, Spain	W35	Clay	(France) Yasmine Mansouri	(Czech Republic) Aneta Kučmová (Germany) Caroline Werner	6–3, 1–6, [6–10]

== Junior Grand Slam tournament finals ==
=== Singles: 1 (runner-up) ===
Result	Year	Tournament	Surface	Opponent	Score
Loss	2020	French Open	Clay	(France) Elsa Jacquemot	6–4, 4–6, 2–6

=== Doubles: 1 (runner-up) ===
Result	Year	Tournament	Surface	Partner	Opponents	Score
Loss	2019	French Open	Clay	(Russia) Anastasia Tikhonova	(United States) Chloe Beck (United States) Emma Navarro	1–6, 2–6

== Wins against top 10 players ==
- Charaeva has a 1–0 record against players who were, at the time the match was played, ranked in the top 10.

No.	Player	Rk	Event	Surface	Rd	Score	Rk	Years	Ref
1	(Kazakhstan) Elena Rybakina	1	China Open, China	Hard	2R	3–6, 6–4, 6–3	118	2026	

- Key: (Rk) first use, opponent rank; (Rd) round; (Rk) 2nd use, player rank; (Ref) reference; (F) final; (SF) semifinal; (QF) quarterfinal; (#R) rounds 4, 3, 2, 1; (RR) round-robin stage; (Q#) qualifying rounds or stages (3), 2, 1.
