= 2026 Aryna Sabalenka tennis season =

2026 tennis player season

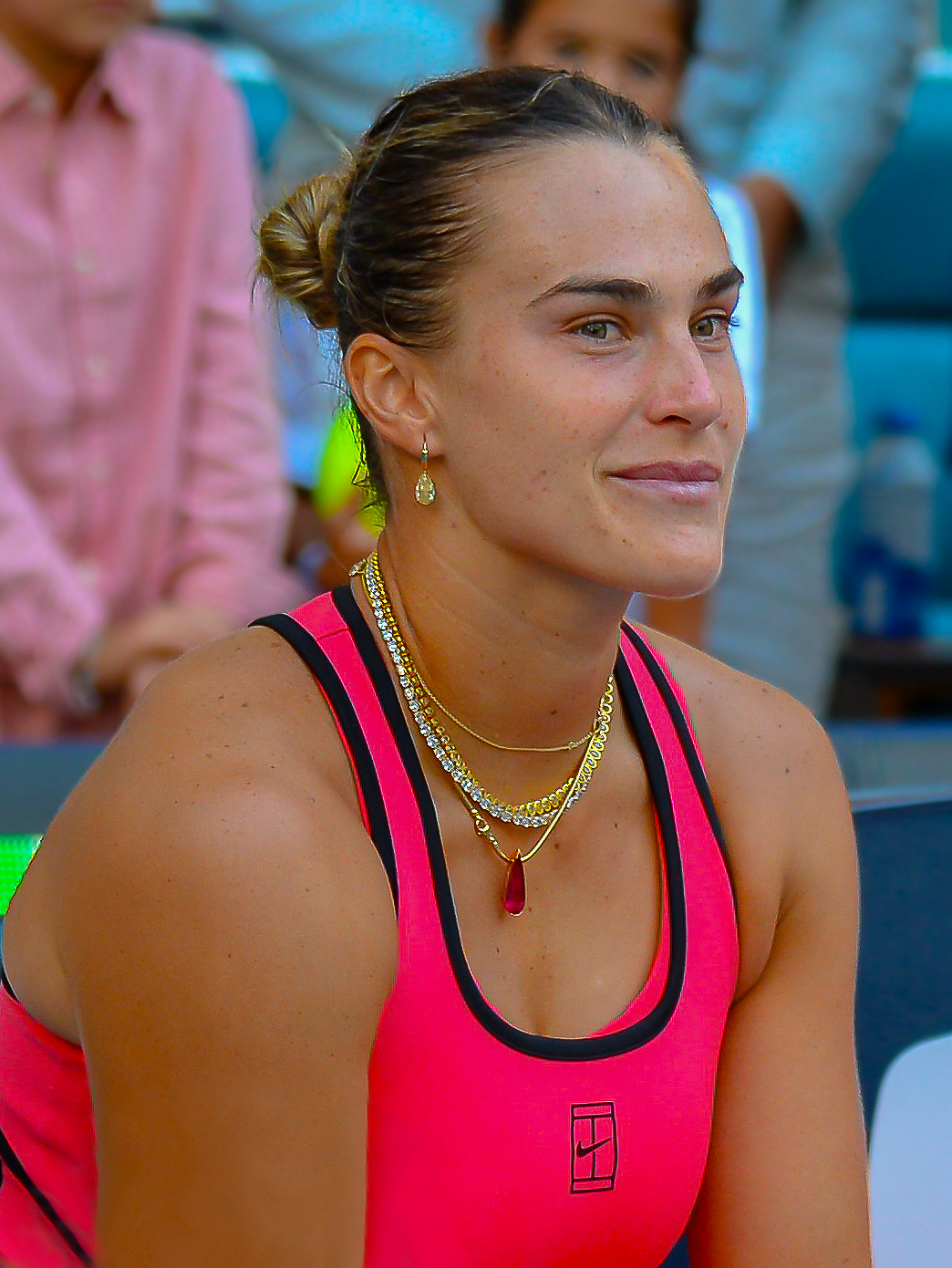
- Sabalenka at the 2026 Miami Open
- Full name: Aryna Siarhiejeŭna Sabalenka
- Country: Belarus
- Calendar prize money: $8,047,378

Singles
- Season record: 46–9 (84%)
- Calendar titles: 3
- Current ranking: No. 2
- Ranking change from previous year: ▼1

Grand Slam & significant results
- Australian Open: F
- French Open: QF
- Wimbledon: 4R
- US Open: F

Doubles
- Season record: 1–0
- Calendar titles: –
- Current ranking: 595
- Ranking change from previous year: New
- Last updated on: 26 September 2026.

The 2026 Aryna Sabalenka tennis season officially began on 4 January 2026, with the start of the 2026 Brisbane International in Brisbane.

This was the first season since 2022, where Sabalenka failed to win any major, losing in the finals of both the Australian Open, and the US Open to arch-rival Elena Rybakina. Following her loss at the US Open, she also lost the world No. 1 to Rybakina. She lost in straight sets in the fourth round of Wimbledon to Naomi Osaka, making her earliest exit at a major since 2022 French Open, also it was first time since 2020 she failed to win a set at a major match, ending a streak of 123 matches.

During the season, she became the fifth woman to complete the Sunshine Double and the first player, male or female, to do so in both singles and doubles. She reached her fourth consecutive Australian Open final, becoming only the second woman after Martina Hingis to do so. She also reached her eighth consecutive hard court major finals becoming the first player in the history, male or female, to do so. She also won a WTA 500 title in Brisbane.

She won 20th consecutive tiebreak at Grandslams breaking Novak Djokovic's record for the most consecutive tiebreaks won in Grandslam history. She extended her run as the world No. 1 ranking for a career total of 107 weeks(10th largest in history), including 99 consecutive weeks(6th largest in history).

== Yearly summary ==
=== Early hard court season ===
Sabalenka began her season at Brisbane International where she defeated Cristina Bucșa, Sorana Cîrstea, Madison Keys and Karolína Muchová to reach third consecutive final at the event. There she defeated Marta Kostyuk 6–4, 6–3 to win the title for second consecutive year.

==== Australian Open ====
Sabalenka began her Australian Open campaign with straight set victories over Tiantsoa Rakotomanga Rajaonah, Bai Zhuoxuan, Anastasia Potapova, and Victoria Mboko to reach her 13th successive major quarterfinal. She then defeated Iva Jovic and Elina Svitolina to reach her fourth consecutive Australian Open final. In the final, she lost to fifth seed Elena Rybakina 4–6, 6–4, 4–6 in a rematch of their 2023 Australian Open final which Sabalenka won.

==== Sunshine Doubles ====
She defeated Himeno Sakatsume, Jaqueline Cristian and 16th seed Naomi Osaka to reach quarterfinals.This was her 14th consecutive quartefinal on WTA tour becoming the first one to do so since Justin Henin in 2006-08.In the quarterfinals, She defeated Victoria Mboko to reach the semifinal where she defeated Linda Nosková to reach her third Indian Wells final and set up a rematch of 2023 Indian Wells and 2026 Australian Open final with Elena Rybakina. She defeated Rybakina 3–6, 6–3, 7–6^{(8–6)} after being a championship point down in the tiebreak. This was her 10th WTA 1000 and 1st Indian Wells title.

At the Miami Open she defeated Ann Li, Caty McNally and 23rd seed Zheng Qinwen to reach 15th straight quarterfinal on WTA tour and 32nd WTA 1000 quarterfinal in her career. She defeated Hailey Baptiste in quarterfinal and third seed Elena Rybakina in the semifinals to reach her fifth consecutive final and fourth consecutive final in the sunshine double. In the final, she defeated Coco Gauff 6–2, 4–6, 6–3 to successfully defend her title and became just the fifth woman in history to complete the sunshine double.

=== Clay court season ===
Sabalenka withdrew from Stuttgart because of an injury where she was runner-up last year. She started her clay season with a first round bye in Madrid. She then defeated Peyton Stearns, and 29th seed Jaqueline Cristian to reach fourth round.In the fourth round, she came back from a set and a break down to defeat Naomi Osaka 6–7^{(1–7)}, 6–3, 6–2 to reach her 17th consecutive quarterfinal on the WTA tour. She lost in the quarterfinals to Hailey Baptiste 6–2, 2–6, 6–7^{(6-8)} after having six match points.

She received a bye in the first round. In the second round she defeated Barbora Krejčíková in straight sets before losing to 26th seed Sorana Cîrstea in the third round after being a break and a set up, thus marking an end to her 17 consecutive quarterfinals streak on WTA Tour.

=== Grass court season ===
Sabalenka began her grass-court season at Berlin, where she defeated Ekaterina Alexandrova, after receiving a first round bye. She overcame a second set deficit to defeat Nikola Bartůňková to advance to the semifinals, where she lost to Jessica Pegula with a third set bagel.

==== Wimbledon ====
At Wimbledon, Sabalenka lost in the fourth round to Osaka. This marked the first time since the 2022 French Open that she lost a major match before the quarterfinals, snapping a streak of 14 major quarterfinal appearances.

=== North American Swing ===
At the Canadian Open, Sabalenka lost to Alexandrova in the fourth round. She had another fourth-round appearance at the Cincinnati Open, but lost to Sára Bejlek in straight sets.

==== US Open ====
Sabalenka entered the US Open being in contention for the world no. 1 ranking and becoming first player since Serena Williams to do a three-peat at the tournament. She started her title defense fending off Colombian Camila Osorio in staright sets. She then dominated Polina Iatcenko, winning for the loss of just two games within 54 minutes. She then bested Kamilla Rakhimova and Taylor Townsend to reach the quarterfinal without losing a set enroute. She came from a break down in the decider to beat reigning Wimbledon champ Linda Nosková to reach her sixth straight Us Open semifinals, becoming the first since Serena Williams to do. She defeated Jessica Pegula for the third striaght edition of the tournament to reach the final to face Elena Rybakina. This was Sabalenka's eight straight hard court major final, becoming the first male or female player to do so. This was the only second time that same players faced off in the final of both hard court majors in the same year since Steffi Graf and Arantxa Sánchez Vicario. In the first US Open final contested by the top two seeds since 2013 Sabalenka lost to Rybakina in three sets, ending her bid for a three-peat. She also lost the no. 1 ranking to Rybakina, ending her reign of 99 consecutive weeks atop the rankings, the sixth-longest streak of all time.

== All matches ==
This table chronicles all the matches of Aryna Sabalenka in 2026.

Key
W	F	SF	QF	#R	RR	Q#	P#	DNQ	A	Z#	PO	G	S	B	NMS	NTI	P	NH

(W) winner; (F) finalist; (SF) semifinalist; (QF) quarterfinalist; (#R) rounds 4, 3, 2, 1; (RR) round-robin stage; (Q#) qualification round; (P#) preliminary round; (DNQ) did not qualify; (A) absent; (Z#) Davis/Fed Cup Zonal Group (with number indication) or (PO) play-off; (G) gold, (S) silver or (B) bronze Olympic/Paralympic medal; (NMS) not a Masters tournament; (NTI) not a Tier I tournament; (P) postponed; (NH) not held; (SR) strike rate (events won / competed); (W–L) win–loss record.
To avoid confusion and double counting, these charts are updated at the conclusion of a tournament or when the player's participation has ended.

=== Singles matches ===
Tournament	Match	Round	Opponent	Rank	Result	Score
Brisbane International; Brisbane, Australia; WTA 500; Hard, outdoor; 4 January 2026 – 11 January 2026	–	1R	Bye			
Brisbane International; Brisbane, Australia; WTA 500; Hard, outdoor; 4 January 2026 – 11 January 2026	1	2R	(Spain) Cristina Bucșa	50	Win	6–0, 6–1
Brisbane International; Brisbane, Australia; WTA 500; Hard, outdoor; 4 January 2026 – 11 January 2026	2	3R	(Romania) Sorana Cîrstea	41	Win	6–3, 6–3
Brisbane International; Brisbane, Australia; WTA 500; Hard, outdoor; 4 January 2026 – 11 January 2026	3	QF	(United States) Madison Keys (5)	7	Win	6–3, 6–3
Brisbane International; Brisbane, Australia; WTA 500; Hard, outdoor; 4 January 2026 – 11 January 2026	4	SF	(Czech Republic) Karolína Muchová (11)	20	Win	6–3, 6–4
Brisbane International; Brisbane, Australia; WTA 500; Hard, outdoor; 4 January 2026 – 11 January 2026	5	W	(Ukraine) Marta Kostyuk (16)	26	Win (1)	6–4, 6–3
Australian Open; Melbourne, Australia; Grand Slam; Hard, outdoor; 18 January 2026 – 1 February 2026	6	1R	(France) Tiantsoa Rakotomanga Rajaonah (WC)	118	Win	6–4, 6–1
Australian Open; Melbourne, Australia; Grand Slam; Hard, outdoor; 18 January 2026 – 1 February 2026	7	2R	(China) Bai Zhuoxuan (Q)	702	Win	6–3, 6–1
Australian Open; Melbourne, Australia; Grand Slam; Hard, outdoor; 18 January 2026 – 1 February 2026	8	3R	(Austria) Anastasia Potapova	55	Win	7–6^{(7–4)}, 7–6^{(9–7)}
Australian Open; Melbourne, Australia; Grand Slam; Hard, outdoor; 18 January 2026 – 1 February 2026	9	4R	(Canada) Victoria Mboko (17)	16	Win	6–1, 7–6^{(7–1)}
Australian Open; Melbourne, Australia; Grand Slam; Hard, outdoor; 18 January 2026 – 1 February 2026	10	QF	(United States) Iva Jovic (29)	27	Win	6–3, 6–0
Australian Open; Melbourne, Australia; Grand Slam; Hard, outdoor; 18 January 2026 – 1 February 2026	11	SF	(Ukraine) Elina Svitolina (11)	12	Win	6–2, 6–3
Australian Open; Melbourne, Australia; Grand Slam; Hard, outdoor; 18 January 2026 – 1 February 2026	12	F	(Kazakhstan) Elena Rybakina (5)	5	Loss	4–6, 6–4, 4–6
Indian Wells Open; Indian Wells, United States; WTA 1000; Hard, outdoor; 4 March 2026 – 15 March 2026	–	1R	Bye			
Indian Wells Open; Indian Wells, United States; WTA 1000; Hard, outdoor; 4 March 2026 – 15 March 2026	13	2R	(Japan) Himeno Sakatsume (Q)	136	Win	6–4, 6–2
Indian Wells Open; Indian Wells, United States; WTA 1000; Hard, outdoor; 4 March 2026 – 15 March 2026	14	3R	(Romania) Jaqueline Cristian	35	Win	6–4, 6–1
Indian Wells Open; Indian Wells, United States; WTA 1000; Hard, outdoor; 4 March 2026 – 15 March 2026	15	4R	(Japan) Naomi Osaka (16)	16	Win	6–2, 6–4
Indian Wells Open; Indian Wells, United States; WTA 1000; Hard, outdoor; 4 March 2026 – 15 March 2026	16	QF	(Canada) Victoria Mboko (10)	10	Win	7–6^{(7–0)}, 6–4
Indian Wells Open; Indian Wells, United States; WTA 1000; Hard, outdoor; 4 March 2026 – 15 March 2026	17	SF	(Czech Republic) Linda Nosková (14)	14	Win	6–3, 6–4
Indian Wells Open; Indian Wells, United States; WTA 1000; Hard, outdoor; 4 March 2026 – 15 March 2026	18	W	(Kazakhstan) Elena Rybakina (3)	3	Win (2)	3–6, 6–3, 7–6^{(8–6)}
Miami Open; Miami, United States; WTA 1000; Hard, outdoor; 17 March 2026 – 29 March 2026	–	1R	Bye			
Miami Open; Miami, United States; WTA 1000; Hard, outdoor; 17 March 2026 – 29 March 2026	19	2R	(United States) Ann Li	39	Win	7–6^{(7–5)}, 6–4
Miami Open; Miami, United States; WTA 1000; Hard, outdoor; 17 March 2026 – 29 March 2026	20	3R	(United States) Caty McNally	72	Win	6–4, 6–2
Miami Open; Miami, United States; WTA 1000; Hard, outdoor; 17 March 2026 – 29 March 2026	21	4R	(China) Zheng Qinwen (23)	26	Win	6–3, 6–4
Miami Open; Miami, United States; WTA 1000; Hard, outdoor; 17 March 2026 – 29 March 2026	22	QF	(United States) Hailey Baptiste	45	Win	6–4, 6–4
Miami Open; Miami, United States; WTA 1000; Hard, outdoor; 17 March 2026 – 29 March 2026	23	SF	(Kazakhstan) Elena Rybakina (3)	2	Win	6–4, 6–3
Miami Open; Miami, United States; WTA 1000; Hard, outdoor; 17 March 2026 – 29 March 2026	24	W	(United States) Coco Gauff (4)	4	Win (3)	6–2, 4–6, 6–3
Madrid Open; Madrid, Spain; WTA 1000; Clay, outdoor; 21 April 2026 – 3 May 2026	–	1R	Bye			
Madrid Open; Madrid, Spain; WTA 1000; Clay, outdoor; 21 April 2026 – 3 May 2026	25	2R	(United States) Peyton Stearns	43	Win	7–5, 6–3
Madrid Open; Madrid, Spain; WTA 1000; Clay, outdoor; 21 April 2026 – 3 May 2026	26	3R	(Romania) Jaqueline Cristian (29)	33	Win	6–1, 6–4
Madrid Open; Madrid, Spain; WTA 1000; Clay, outdoor; 21 April 2026 – 3 May 2026	27	4R	(Japan) Naomi Osaka (14)	15	Win	6–7^{(1–7)}, 6–3, 6–2
Madrid Open; Madrid, Spain; WTA 1000; Clay, outdoor; 21 April 2026 – 3 May 2026	28	QF	(United States) Hailey Baptiste (30)	32	Loss	6–2, 2–6, 6–7^{(6–8)}
Italian Open; Rome, Italy; WTA 1000; Clay, outdoor; 5 May 2026 – 17 May 2026	–	1R	Bye			
Italian Open; Rome, Italy; WTA 1000; Clay, outdoor; 5 May 2026 – 17 May 2026	29	2R	(Czech Republic) Barbora Krejčíková	53	Win	6–2, 6–3
Italian Open; Rome, Italy; WTA 1000; Clay, outdoor; 5 May 2026 – 17 May 2026	30	3R	(Romania) Sorana Cîrstea (26)	27	Loss	6–2, 3–6, 5–7
French Open; Paris, France; Grand Slam; Clay, outdoor; 24 May 2026 – 7 June 2026	31	1R	(Spain) Jéssica Bouzas Maneiro	50	Win	6–4, 6–2
French Open; Paris, France; Grand Slam; Clay, outdoor; 24 May 2026 – 7 June 2026	32	2R	(France) Elsa Jacquemot	67	Win	7–5, 6–2
French Open; Paris, France; Grand Slam; Clay, outdoor; 24 May 2026 – 7 June 2026	33	3R	(Australia) Daria Kasatkina	53	Win	6–0, 7–5
French Open; Paris, France; Grand Slam; Clay, outdoor; 24 May 2026 – 7 June 2026	34	4R	(Japan) Naomi Osaka (16)	16	Win	7–5, 6–3
French Open; Paris, France; Grand Slam; Clay, outdoor; 24 May 2026 – 7 June 2026	35	QF	Diana Shnaider (Note: Russian and Belarus players are not allowed to compete under the name or flag of their country following the Russian invasion of Ukraine.) (25)	23	Loss	6–3, 5–7, 0–6
German Open; Berlin, Germany; WTA 500; Grass, outdoor; 15 June 2026 – 21 June 2026	–	1R	Bye			
German Open; Berlin, Germany; WTA 500; Grass, outdoor; 15 June 2026 – 21 June 2026	36	2R	Ekaterina Alexandrova	19	Win	6–4, 6–4
German Open; Berlin, Germany; WTA 500; Grass, outdoor; 15 June 2026 – 21 June 2026	37	QF	(Czech Republic) Nikola Bartůňková (WC)	62	Win	2–6, 7–6^{(7–2)}, 6–4
German Open; Berlin, Germany; WTA 500; Grass, outdoor; 15 June 2026 – 21 June 2026	38	SF	(United States) Jessica Pegula (5)	4	Loss	4–6, 7–6^{(7–4)}, 0–6
Wimbledon Championships; London, Great Britain; Grand Slam; Grass, outdoor; 29 June 2026 – 12 July 2026	39	1R	(Serbia) Teodora Kostović (Q)	184	Win	6–2, 6–3
Wimbledon Championships; London, Great Britain; Grand Slam; Grass, outdoor; 29 June 2026 – 12 July 2026	40	2R	(United States) McCartney Kessler	57	Win	6–1, 7–6^{(11–9)}
Wimbledon Championships; London, Great Britain; Grand Slam; Grass, outdoor; 29 June 2026 – 12 July 2026	41	3R	(Latvia) Jeļena Ostapenko	31	Win	6–4, 6–4
Wimbledon Championships; London, Great Britain; Grand Slam; Grass, outdoor; 29 June 2026 – 12 July 2026	42	4R	(Japan) Naomi Osaka (14)	16	Loss	2–6, 6–7^{(2–7)}
Canadian Open; Toronto, Canada; WTA 1000; Hard, outdoor; 2 August 2026 – 13 August 2026	–	1R	Bye			
Canadian Open; Toronto, Canada; WTA 1000; Hard, outdoor; 2 August 2026 – 13 August 2026	43	2R	(Japan) Moyuka Uchijima (Q)	111	Win	6–3, 6–3
Canadian Open; Toronto, Canada; WTA 1000; Hard, outdoor; 2 August 2026 – 13 August 2026	44	3R	(China) Zhang Shuai	62	Win	6–3, 6–4
Canadian Open; Toronto, Canada; WTA 1000; Hard, outdoor; 2 August 2026 – 13 August 2026	45	4R	Ekaterina Alexandrova (16)	27	Loss	6–7^{(3–7)}, 6–4, 4–6
Cincinnati Open; Cincinnati, United States; WTA 1000; Hard, outdoor; 13 August 2026 – 23 August 2026	–	1R	Bye			
Cincinnati Open; Cincinnati, United States; WTA 1000; Hard, outdoor; 13 August 2026 – 23 August 2026	46	2R	(Australia) Talia Gibson	65	Win	6–2, 7–6^{(7–2)}
Cincinnati Open; Cincinnati, United States; WTA 1000; Hard, outdoor; 13 August 2026 – 23 August 2026	47	3R	(China) Wang Xinyu	36	Win	6–1, 6–3
Cincinnati Open; Cincinnati, United States; WTA 1000; Hard, outdoor; 13 August 2026 – 23 August 2026	48	4R	(Czech Republic) Sára Bejlek	35	Loss	6–7^{(7–9)}, 4–6
US Open; New York City, United States; Grand Slam; Hard, outdoor; 30 August 2026 – September 2026
US Open; New York City, United States; Grand Slam; Hard, outdoor; 30 August 2026 – September 2026	49	1R	(Colombia) Camila Osorio	59	Win	6–2, 6–4
US Open; New York City, United States; Grand Slam; Hard, outdoor; 30 August 2026 – September 2026	50	2R	Polina Iatcenko	160	Win	6–1, 6–1
US Open; New York City, United States; Grand Slam; Hard, outdoor; 30 August 2026 – September 2026	51	3R	(Uzbekistan) Kamilla Rakhimova	92	Win	6–3, 6–4
US Open; New York City, United States; Grand Slam; Hard, outdoor; 30 August 2026 – September 2026	52	4R	(United States) Taylor Townsend	96	Win	6–4, 6–3
US Open; New York City, United States; Grand Slam; Hard, outdoor; 30 August 2026 – September 2026	53	QF	(Czech Republic) Linda Nosková (6)	6	Win	7–6^{(7–1)}, 3–6,7–6^{(10–7)}
US Open; New York City, United States; Grand Slam; Hard, outdoor; 30 August 2026 – September 2026	54	SF	(United States) Jessica Pegula (3)	3	Win	7–5, 6–2
US Open; New York City, United States; Grand Slam; Hard, outdoor; 30 August 2026 – September 2026	55	F	(Kazakhstan) Elena Rybakina (2)	2	Loss	4–6, 7–5, 2–6

=== Double Matches ===
Tournament	Match	Round	Opponent	Combined Rank	Result	Score
Brisbane International; Brisbane, Australia; WTA 500; Hard, outdoor; 4 January 2026 – 11 January 2026; Partner: (Spain) Paula Badosa	1	1R	(China) Zhang Shuai / Ludmilla Samsonova	57	Win	7–6^{(7–2)}, 7–6^{(7–3)}
Brisbane International; Brisbane, Australia; WTA 500; Hard, outdoor; 4 January 2026 – 11 January 2026; Partner: (Spain) Paula Badosa	—	QF	(Australia) Ellen Perez / (Spain) Cristina Bucsa (3)	51	Walkover	—N/a

== Schedule ==
Per Aryna Sabalenka, this is her current 2026 schedule (subject to change).

=== Singles schedule ===
Key
W	F	SF	QF	#R	RR

(W) winner; (F) finalist; (SF) semifinalist; (QF) quarterfinalist; (#R) rounds 4, 3, 2, 1; (RR) round-robin stage.

Date	Tournament	Location	Tier	Surface	Prev. result	Prev. points	New points	Result
4 January 2026 – 11 January 2026	Brisbane International	Australia	WTA 500	Hard	W	500	500	Winner defeated (Ukraine) Marta Kostyuk, 6–4, 6–3
18 January 2026– 1 February 2026	Australian Open	Australia	Grand Slam	Hard	F	1300	1300	Final lost to (Kazakhstan) Elena Rybakina, 4–6, 6–4, 4–6
4 March 2026 – 15 March 2026	Indian Wells Open	United States	WTA 1000	Hard	F	650	1000	Winner defeated (Kazakhstan) Elena Rybakina, 3–6, 6–3, 7–6^{(8–6)}
17 March 2026 – 29 March 2026	Miami Open	United States	WTA 1000	Hard	W	1000	1000	Winner defeated (United States) Coco Gauff, 6–2, 4–6, 6–3
13 April 2026 – 19 April 2026	Stuttgart Open	Germany	WTA 500	Clay (i)	F	325	0	Withdrew
21 April 2026 – 3 May 2026	Madrid Open	Spain	WTA 1000	Clay	W	1000	215	Quarterfinal lost to (United States) Hailey Baptiste, 6–2, 2–6, 6–7^{(6–8)}
5 May 2026 – 17 May 2026	Italian Open	Italy	WTA 1000	Clay	QF	215	65	Third round lost to (Romania) Sorana Cirstea, 6–2, 3–6, 5–7
24 May 2026 – 7 June 2026	French Open	France	Grand Slam	Clay	F	1300	430	Quarterfinals lost to Diana Shnaider, 6–3, 5–7, 0–6
15 June 2026 – 21 June 2026	German Open	Germany	WTA 500	Grass	SF	195	195	Semifinals lost to Jessica Pegula, 4–6, 7–6^{(7—4)}, 0—6
29 June 2026 – 12 July 2026	Wimbledon Championships	United Kingdom	Grand Slam	Grass	SF	780	240	Fourth round lost to (Japan) Naomi Osaka, 2—6, 6—7^{(2—7)}
2 August 2026 – 13 August 2026	Canadian Open	Canada	WTA 1000	Hard	A	0	120	Fourth round lost to Ekaterina Alexandrova, 6–7^{(3–7)}, 6–4, 4–6
13 August 2026 – 23 August 2026	Cincinnati Open	United States	WTA 1000	Hard	QF	215	120	Fourth round lost to (Czech Republic) Sára Bejlek, 6–7^{(7–9)}, 4–6
30 August 2026 – 13 September 2026	US Open	United States	Grand Slam	Hard	W	2000	1300	Final lost to (Kazakhstan) Elena Rybakina, 4–6, 7–5, 2–6
Total year-end points						9480	6485	▼2995 difference

== Yearly records ==
=== Head-to-head match-ups ===
Sabalenka has a 46–9 (84%) WTA match win–loss record in the 2026 season. Her record against players who were part of the WTA rankings top ten at the time of their meetings is 7–3 (70%). Bold indicates player was ranked top 10 at the time of at least one meeting. The following list is ordered by number of wins:

- (Romania) Jaqueline Cristian 2–0
- (Canada) **Victoria Mboko** 2–0
- (Czech Republic) **Linda Nosková** 2–0
- (China) Bai Zhuoxuan 1–0
- (Czech Republic) Nikola Bartůňková 1–0
- (Spain) Jéssica Bouzas Maneiro 1–0
- (Spain) Cristina Bucșa 1–0
- (United States) **Coco Gauff** 1–0
- (France) Elsa Jacquemot 1–0
- (United States) Iva Jovic 1–0
- (Serbia) Teodora Kostovic 1–0
- (United States) McCartney Kessler 1–0
- (Japan) Moyuka Uchijima 1–0
- (China) Shuai Zhang 1–0
- (China) Wang Xinyu 1–0
- (Australia) Talia Gibson 1–0
- Polina Iatcenko 1–0
- (Latvia) Jelena Ostapenko 1–0
- (Australia) Daria Kasatkina 1–0
- (United States) **Madison Keys** 1–0
- (Ukraine) Marta Kostyuk 1–0
- (Czech Republic) Barbora Krejčíková 1–0
- (United States) Ann Li 1–0
- (United States) Caty McNally 1–0
- (Czech Republic) Karolína Muchová 1–0
- (Colombia) Camila Osorio 1–0
- (Austria) Anastasia Potapova 1–0
- (Uzbekistan) Kamilla Rakhimova 1–0
- (France) Tiantsoa Rakotomanga Rajaonah 1–0
- (Japan) Himeno Sakatsume 1–0
- (United States) Peyton Stearns 1–0
- (Ukraine) Elina Svitolina 1–0
- (United States) Taylor Townsend 1–0
- (China) Zheng Qinwen 1–0
- (Japan) Naomi Osaka 3–1
- (Kazakhstan) **Elena Rybakina** 2–2
- Ekaterina Alexandrova 1–1
- (United States) Hailey Baptiste 1–1
- (Romania) Sorana Cîrstea 1–1
- (United States) **Jessica Pegula** 1–1
- (Serbia) Sara Bejlek 0–1
- Diana Shnaider 0–1

=== Top 10 record ===
Result	W–L	Opponent	Rk	Tournament	Surface	Rd	Score	Rk	Ref
Win	1–0	(United States) Madison Keys	10	Brisbane International, Australia	Hard	QF	6–3, 6–3	1	
Loss	1–1	(Kazakhstan) Elena Rybakina	5	Australian Open, Australia	Hard	F	4–6, 6–4, 4–6	1	
Win	2–1	(Canada) Victoria Mboko	10	Indian Wells Open, United States	Hard	QF	7–6^{(7–0)} 6–4	1	
Win	3–1	(Kazakhstan) Elena Rybakina	3	Indian Wells Open, United States	Hard	F	3–6, 6–3, 7–6^{(8–6)}	1	
Win	4–1	(Kazakhstan) Elena Rybakina	2	Miami Open, United States	Hard	SF	6–4, 6–3	1	
Win	5–1	(United States) Coco Gauff	4	Miami Open, United States	Hard	F	6–2, 4–6, 6–3	1	
Loss	5–2	(United States) Jessica Pegula	4	German Open, Germany	Grass	SF	4–6, 7–6^{(7–4)}, 0–6	1	
Win	6–2	(Czech Republic) Linda Nosková	6	US Open, United States	Hard	QF	7–6^{(7–1)}, 3–6, 7–6^{(10–7)}	1	
Win	7–2	(United States) Jessica Pegula	3	US Open, United States	Hard	SF	7–5, 6–2	1	
Loss	7–3	(Kazakhstan) Elena Rybakina	2	US Open, United States	Hard	F	4–6, 7–5, 2–6	1	

- Key: (Rk) first use, opponent rank; (Rd) round; (Rk) 2nd use, player rank; (Ref) reference; (F) final; (SF) semifinal; (QF) quarterfinal; (#R) rounds 4, 3, 2, 1; (RR) round-robin stage; (Q#) qualifying rounds or stages (3), 2, 1.

=== Finals ===
==== Singles:5 (3 titles, 2 final) ====
Legend Grand Slam tournaments (0–2) WTA Tour Championships (0–0) WTA 1000 (2–0) WTA 500 (1–0)	Finals by surface Hard (3–2) Clay (0–0)	Finals by setting Outdoor (3–2) Indoor (0–0)

Result	W–L	Date	Tournament	Tier	Surface	Opponent	Score
Win	1–0	Jan 2026	Brisbane International, Australia	WTA 500	Hard	(Ukraine) Marta Kostyuk	6–4, 6–3
Loss	1–1	Jan 2026	Australian Open, Australia	Grand Slam	Hard	(Kazakhstan) Elena Rybakina	4–6, 6–4, 4–6
Win	2–1	Mar 2026	Indian Wells Open, United States	WTA 1000	Hard	(Kazakhstan) Elena Rybakina	3–6, 6–3, 7–6^{(8–6)}
Win	3–1	Mar 2026	Miami Open, United States	WTA 1000	Hard	(United States) Coco Gauff	6–2, 4–6, 6–3
Loss	3–2	Sep 2026	US Open, United States	Grand Slam	Hard	(Kazakhstan) Elena Rybakina	4–6, 7–5, 2–6

=== Earnings ===
- **Bold** font denotes tournament win

Event	Prize money	Year-to-date
**Singles**
**Brisbane International**	**$214,530**	$214,530
Australian Open	A$2,150,000	$1,606,482
**Indian Wells Open**	**$1,085,220**	$2,691,702
**Miami Open**	**$1,151,380**	$3,843,082
Madrid Open	$169,375	$4,012,457
Italian Open	$47,375	$4,059,832
French Open	€470,000	$4,608,171
German Open	$66,003	$4,674,174
Wimbledon Championships	$401,837	$5,076,011
National Bank Open	$81,800	$5,157,811
Cincinnati Open	$81,752	$5,239,563
US Open	$2,800,000	$8,039,563
		**$8,039,563**
**Doubles**
Brisbane International	$7,815	$7,815
		**$7,815**
**Total**
		**$8,047,378**

Figures in United States dollars (USD) unless noted.

== See also ==
- 2026 Coco Gauff tennis season
- 2026 Elena Rybakina tennis season
- 2026 Iga Świątek tennis season
