= 2026 Elena Rybakina tennis season =

2026 tennis player season

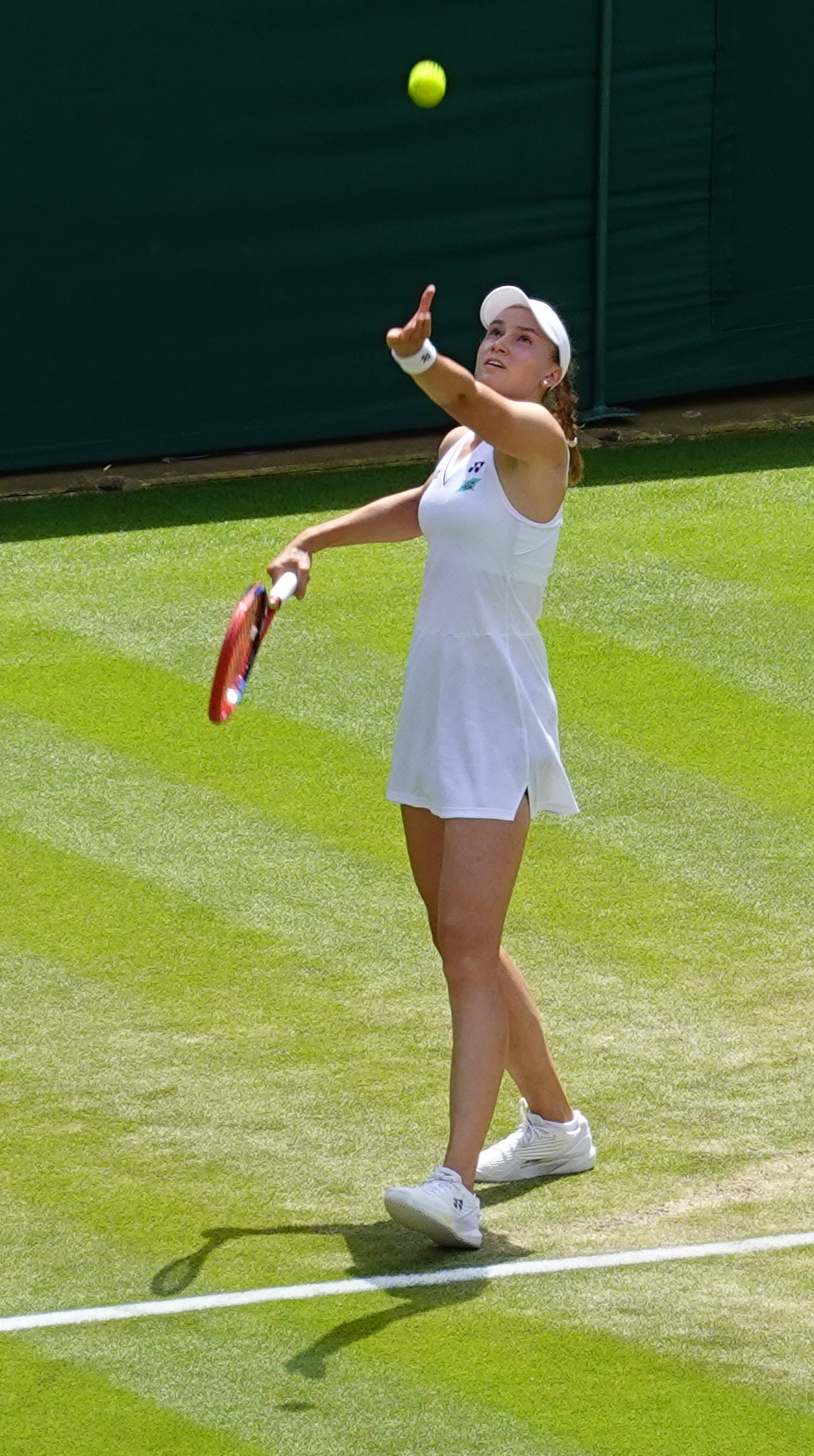
- Rybakina at the 2026 Wimbledon Championships
- Full name: Elena Rybakina
- Country: Kazakhstan
- Calendar prize money: $11,100,945

Singles
- Season record: 54–14 (79%)
- Calendar titles: 4
- Current ranking: No. 1 (14 September 2026)
- Ranking change from previous year: ▲4

Grand Slam & significant results
- Australian Open: W
- French Open: 2R
- Wimbledon: 3R
- US Open: W

Doubles
- Season record: 0–0 ( – )
- Current ranking: No. 268

Injuries
- Injuries: Ankle injury(Cincinnati Open)
- Last updated on: 25 October 2026.

The 2026 Elena Rybakina tennis season officially began on 4 January 2026, with the start of the Brisbane International in Brisbane and ended on 7 November 2026 with her withdrawal from the WTA Finals in Indian Wells.

This was Rybakina's most successful season on the tour so far, which saw her win a career-best four titles, including two major titles at the Australian Open and the US Open. In both majors she defeated rival Aryna Sabalenka, and became only the sixth player to win both hardcourt majors in the same year. She also reached the world no. 1 ranking on 14 September 2026 following her US Open victory, becoming the 30th player to do so, and would finish the year ranked as no 1.

Other notable highlights include her reaching the final of two WTA 1000 tournaments; the Indian Wells Open, losing to Aryna Sabalenka in three sets, and the Canadian Open where she lost to Iga Świątek in straight sets. She also won two titles at WTA 500 level; the Stuttgart Open, defeating Karolína Muchová in the final, repeating a title for the first time in her career, and the Ningbo Open, where she beat Leylah Fernandez to successfully defend a title for the first time in her career. She also won 12 consecutive matches against top 10 players, becoming fifth player to do so in the 21st century, and registered her 400th career win by defeating Wang Xinyu at the Qatar Open.

Although she lost in the second round of the French Open, and in third round of the Wimbledon, her other achievements throughout the season meant that she was the first player to qualify for the WTA Finals.

Rybakina also struggled with injures, most notably a flare-up of a chronic achilles tendon injury. She was forced to retire after aggravating it during her quarterfinal match at the Cincinnati Open, and would play the latter stages of her winning US Open campaign on painkillers. She later withdrew from Billie Jean King Cup Finals citing the need for rest, and, after her debut as no 1 saw her defeated in her opening match at the Beijing Open, she later withdrew from the Wuhan Open, citing the need for further rest. Rybakina also withdrew from the Tokyo Open after winning her first match citing a neck injury and the desire to rest ahead of the WTA Finals, however, a viral illness forced her to withdraw from the event the day before she was scheduled to play.

== Yearly summary ==
=== Early hard court season ===
Rybakina began her season at the Brisbane International where she lost to Karolína Muchová in the quarterfinals. This marked an end to Rybakina's 13-match long winning streak since October.

==== Australian Open ====
At the Australian Open, seeded 5th, she reached her first major quarterfinals since 2024 Wimbledon Championships. She then defeated World No. 2 Iga Świątek, in the quarterfinals and World No. 6 Jessica Pegula in the semifinals to reach her second Australian Open final. There, she defeated World No.1 Aryna Sabalenka from 0–3 down in third set in a rematch of their 2023 Australian Open final, winning her first Australian Open and second major title overall becoming only the 4th women in open era to defeat the World No. 1 and World No. 2 en route to an Australian Open title. As a result, she moved to No. 3 in the world rankings for the first time since early 2024.

==== Middle-East Swing ====
Following her Australian Open victory, Rybakina next participated in Qatar Open. In the second round she defeated Wang Xinyu to register her 400th career win while simultaneously completing 400 matches on the WTA Tour. She then defeated Zheng Qinwen coming from a set down to reach the quarter finals where she lost to Victoria Mboko 5–7, 6–4, 4–6 despite being up 4–2 in third set.

She then participated at the Dubai Open where she was seeded first for the first time at a WTA 1000 tournament. She defeated Kimberly Birrell 6–1, 6–4 in the second round before retiring against Antonia Ružić because of illness.

==== Sunshine Doubles ====
Before the beginning of Indian Wells Open she participated in the mixed doubles exhibition Tie Break Tens partnering with Taylor Fritz where they were the defending champions. The pair defeated Jasmine Paolini/Matteo Berrettini and Iga Świątek/Casper Ruud to reach the final where they defeated Amanda Anisimova/Learner Tien 10–7 to win the tournament for second consecutive year.

She began her Indian Wells campaign by defeating Hailey Baptiste 7–6^{(7–5)}, 2–6, 6–2 in the hard-fought second round after receiving first round bye. She then defeated 28th seed Marta Kostyuk and Sonay Kartal to reach her 19th WTA 1000 quarterfinals. In the quarterfinals, she knocked out Jessica Pegula to reach semifinals. As a result of her win she would reach her career high World Rank 2. She defeated ninth seed Elina Svitolina in the semifinal to set up a rematch of 2023 Indian Wells Open with World No.1 Aryna Sabalenka, won by Rybakina.This was her 12th consecutive victory over a top 10 player becoming the fifth player to do so in 21st century after Venus Williams, Serena Williams, Justin Henin, and Iga Świątek. In the final she lost the match 6–3, 3–6, 6–7^{(6–8)} after being having a championship point on her serve.

After receiving a bye in the first round, she defeated compatriot Yulia Putintseva to kickstart her Miami Open campaign. She then defeated 27th seed Marta Kostyuk and qualifier Talia Gibson to reach the quarterfinals. In the quartefinal she defeated fifth seed Jessica Pegula in three sets after being down a set, this was her fifth win over Pegula in seven months. Her run ended in semifinals after a straight set loss to Aryna Sabalenka.

=== Clay court season ===
Rybakina began her clay season at Stuttgart as the first seed and received bye in the first round. She defeated Diana Shnaider in the second round to reach quarter-final. In the quarter-finals she came back from a set down, and saved two match points to defeat Leylah Fernandez. She defeated Mirra Andreeva in the semifinals to reach her third final of the year. In the final she defeated Karolína Muchová to win Stuttgart Open for the second time in her career. This was also her second title of the year.

Rybakina received a bye in the first round as the second seed. In the second round she defeated Elena-Gabriela Ruse 4–6, 6–3, 7–5 in comeback win after being a set down and also a break down in third set. She registered another comeback win against Zheng Qinwen 4–6, 6–4, 6–3 in a controversial third round match before losing to lucky loser Anastasia Potapova in the next round.

She received a bye in the first round as the second seed. She then defeated Maria Sakkari, Alexandra Eala, and Karolína Plíšková all in straight sets to reach quarterfinals where she lost to Elina Svitolina converting just 4 of 20 break points.

==== French Open ====
Rybakina began her French Open campaign with a dominant straight sets victory over Veronika Erjavec before being stunned in the second round by Yulia Starodubtseva in the next round her earliest loss at the tournament since 2020 and at a major since 2024 Australian Open. She was also in contention for WTA No. 1 ranking for the first time in her career at the beginning of the tournament.

=== Grass court season ===
Rybakina began her grass court season with a bye into second round of Queens Club as the top seed. She avenged her last year's quarterfinal loss by defeating defending champion Tatjana Maria in second round after trailing by a set and 4–5(0–30) in the second set by winning 9 consecutive games and 12 consecutive points to finish the match.However, she was stunned in the quarterfinal by home favourite Katie Boulter.

Rybakina then lost to Alexandra Eala in the second round of Berlin after receiving bye in the first round. This was first time since March 2026 when Rybakina lost two consecutive matches.

Wimbledon

She defeated Loïs Boisson in the tough three-setter first round, which was also her 300th win on WTA Tour. She then defeated Caty McNally in straight sets in the second round. She next lost to Elise Mertens for second consecutive third round exit in the tournament. Rybakina was also in contention for World No. 1 at the beginning of the tournament.

=== North American hard court swing ===
As the second seed, Rybakina received a bye into the second round of the 2026 Canadian Open. She prevailed in a tough second round match against Daria Kasatkina in three sets, and saved two set points in the third round against Ann Li, winning four consecutive games from 3–5 down in the second set. She then made a comeback from 0–3 down in the third set to win 6–4, 4–6, 6–4 thriller against Ludmilla Samsonova to reach the quarterfinal. There, she came back from a set and a break down against former World No. 1 Naomi Osaka, to win 4–6, 7–6^{(7–5)}, 6–4. Reaching her third consecutive semifinal at the tournament, she set up her second meeting with Coco Gauff. In the semifinals, Rybakina made another comeback against Gauff from a set down, winning thrteen consecutive points in the second set en route to a 5–7, 6–2, 6–2 victory, in a match that finished at nearly 1:00 AM local time. Contesting her seventh WTA 1000-level final less than 24 hours later, she lost to Iga Świątek, stating after the match that "the tank was half-empty today. I tried my best but it wasn't enough." Rybakina was in contention to become World No.1 at the beginning of the tournament, however Aryna Sabalenka retained the ranking by reaching the fourth round.

At the Cincinnati Open, Rybakina again received a bye as the second seed, and defeated Taylor Townsend, Magdalena Fręch, and 14th seeded Diana Shnaider, all in straight sets, to reach the quarterfinals, setting up a rematch of the previous week's final in Toronto against Iga Świątek. After Aryna Sabalenka's fourth-round loss at the tournament, Rybakina needed to reach the final in order to obtain the World No. 1 ranking. However, she retired in the first set against Świątek down 1–4 after an sustaining an injury in her left foot.

==== US Open ====
Rybakina's participation in the US Open was doubtful after her injury in Cincinnati. However, after a week of injury she started practice and confirmed her participation. She would be in contention to become world No.1 at the end of the tournament.

Rybakina started her campaign with a straight sets victory over wildcard Thea Frodin without getting broken in the entire match. She registered another straight sets victory against Jessica Bouzas Maneiro to reach third round. She came from a break down and saved a set point to defeat Yulia Starodubtseva, avenging her French Open loss to Ukrainian earlier in the year. Rybakina put on a dominant show in the fourth round to beat former champion Naomi Osaka in straight sets without getting broken to reach her first ever US Open quarterfinal. Talking about her performance in the match in post-match press conference, Rybakina said 'it was one of the best matches she's ever played'. After losing the first set, Rybakina produced a comeback win against Zheng Qinwen to reach the semis and secure No. 1 spot in the WTA ranking for the first time in her career. She became the 30th player to reach no.1, first representing Kazakhstan and the second oldest first-time no.1 in the WTA history younger than only Angelique Kerber. She made another comeback from a set down in the semifinal to defeat local favourite Coco Gauff to reach her fourth major final and set up a rematch of their Australian Open final with Aryna Sabalenka. This was the only second time that same players faced off in the final of both hard court majors in the same year since Steffi Graf and Arantxa Sánchez Vicario. She also became the fifth player since 2000 to reach the final of both hardcourt majors in the same year.

In the final, she ended the 19-match US Open winning streak of two-time defending champion, World No.1 Aryna Sabalenka to win the third major title of her career and her first US Open title. She became the third player in 21st century after Angelique Kerber and Sabalenka to win both Australian Open and US Open in the same year. She also became the first player to qualify for the WTA Finals following her performance in the tournament.

=== Asian Swing ===
Rybakina later withdrew from the BJK Cup finals due to achilles tendon injury she sustained during the Cincinnati Open, the statement released by KTF also revealed she played through the final matches of the US Open while taking painkillers.

Playing in her first tournament after becoming World no.1 she received bye in the first round of China Open. In the second round, she became the second player after Naomi Osaka to lose her first match after becoming world no. 1, after losing to world no. 118 Alina Charaeva despite being a set and a break up at the China Open. Following her shock exit in the tournament, she withdrew from the Wuhan Open citing injury.

Rybakina started her title defence at Ningbo with a bye into second round, also vying to finish the year as world No.1. In the next round, she registered her first win as no.1 after Polina Kudermetova retired because of shoulder injury. She defeated Katarzyna Kawa in three sets, reaching her second consecutive Ningbo semifinal. In the semifinal, Rybakina converted her 11th set point to win the first set against Diana Shnaider. She got broken to love at 5–4 in the second set, while serving for the match which was also the first time Shanider broke her in three matches. Rybakina however broke back, and held her serve to close out the match 6–3, 7–5 reaching the final in second consecutive year and her sixth final of the year. In the final, Rybakina put on a dominant show against Leylah Fernandez to win her 7th consecutive WTA 500 final overall. This was the first time Rybakina successfully defended a title, and only second tournament after Stuttgart Open which she won multiple times.

Rybakina entered into Tokyo Open looking to secure year end No. 1 for which she need to reach the quarterfinals. She defeated compatriot Yulia Putintseva in the second round in straight sets after receiving bye in the first round. This win made her 17th player in WTA history to finish the year ranked no.1 in the world. She withdrew from the tournament before her next match citing neck injury and inflammation.

=== WTA Finals ===
Entering the WTA Finals in Indian Wells as both the defending champion and no 1 seed, Rybakina participated in the pre-tournament photoshoot before postponing her formal media duties. The following day, Rybakina officially announced her withdrawal from the tournament with a viral illness, stating "I’ve had an incredible season but my body is just not physically ready to compete." A clip was later released by Canal+ Poland in which a visibly unwell Rybakina was attempting to give an interview, but had to stop and leave before she was able to answer a question.

== All matches ==
This table chronicles all the matches of Elena Rybakina in 2026.

Key
W	F	SF	QF	#R	RR	Q#	P#	DNQ	A	Z#	PO	G	S	B	NMS	NTI	P	NH

(W) winner; (F) finalist; (SF) semifinalist; (QF) quarterfinalist; (#R) rounds 4, 3, 2, 1; (RR) round-robin stage; (Q#) qualification round; (P#) preliminary round; (DNQ) did not qualify; (A) absent; (Z#) Davis/Fed Cup Zonal Group (with number indication) or (PO) play-off; (G) gold, (S) silver or (B) bronze Olympic/Paralympic medal; (NMS) not a Masters tournament; (NTI) not a Tier I tournament; (P) postponed; (NH) not held; (SR) strike rate (events won / competed); (W–L) win–loss record.
To avoid confusion and double counting, these charts are updated at the conclusion of a tournament or when the player's participation has ended.

=== Singles matches ===
Tournament	Match	Round	Opponent	Rank	Result	Score
Brisbane International; Brisbane, Australia; WTA 500; Hard, outdoor; 4 January 2026 – 11 January 2026	–	1R	Bye			
Brisbane International; Brisbane, Australia; WTA 500; Hard, outdoor; 4 January 2026 – 11 January 2026	1	2R	(China) Zhang Shuai (Q)	79	Win	6–3, 7–5
Brisbane International; Brisbane, Australia; WTA 500; Hard, outdoor; 4 January 2026 – 11 January 2026	2	3R	(Spain) Paula Badosa (15)	25	Win	6–3, 6–2
Brisbane International; Brisbane, Australia; WTA 500; Hard, outdoor; 4 January 2026 – 11 January 2026	3	QF	(Czech Republic) Karolína Muchová (11)	20	Loss	2–6, 6–2, 4–6
Australian Open; Melbourne, Australia; Grand Slam; Hard, outdoor; 18 January 2026 – 1 February 2026
Australian Open; Melbourne, Australia; Grand Slam; Hard, outdoor; 18 January 2026 – 1 February 2026	4	1R	(Slovenia) Kaja Juvan	100	Win	6–4, 6–3
Australian Open; Melbourne, Australia; Grand Slam; Hard, outdoor; 18 January 2026 – 1 February 2026	5	2R	(France) Varvara Gracheva	104	Win	7–5, 6–2
Australian Open; Melbourne, Australia; Grand Slam; Hard, outdoor; 18 January 2026 – 1 February 2026	6	3R	(Czech Republic) Tereza Valentová	54	Win	6–2, 6–3
Australian Open; Melbourne, Australia; Grand Slam; Hard, outdoor; 18 January 2026 – 1 February 2026	7	4R	(Belgium) Elise Mertens (21)	21	Win	6–1, 6–3
Australian Open; Melbourne, Australia; Grand Slam; Hard, outdoor; 18 January 2026 – 1 February 2026	8	QF	(Poland) Iga Świątek (2)	2	Win	7–5, 6–1
Australian Open; Melbourne, Australia; Grand Slam; Hard, outdoor; 18 January 2026 – 1 February 2026	9	SF	(United States) Jessica Pegula (6)	6	Win	6–3, 7–6^{(9–7)}
Australian Open; Melbourne, Australia; Grand Slam; Hard, outdoor; 18 January 2026 – 1 February 2026	10	W	Aryna Sabalenka (Note: Russian and Belarus players are not allowed to compete under the name or flag of their country following the Russian invasion of Ukraine.) (1)	1	Win (1)	6–4, 4–6, 6–4
Qatar Open; Doha, Qatar; WTA 1000; Hard, outdoor; 8 February 2025 – 14 February 2026	–	1R	Bye			
Qatar Open; Doha, Qatar; WTA 1000; Hard, outdoor; 8 February 2025 – 14 February 2026	11	2R	(China) Wang Xinyu	33	Win	6–2, 6–4
Qatar Open; Doha, Qatar; WTA 1000; Hard, outdoor; 8 February 2025 – 14 February 2026	12	3R	(China) Zheng Qinwen	26	Win	4–6, 6–2, 7–5
Qatar Open; Doha, Qatar; WTA 1000; Hard, outdoor; 8 February 2025 – 14 February 2026	13	QF	(Canada) Victoria Mboko (10)	13	Loss	5–7, 6–4, 4–6
Dubai Open; Dubai, UAE; WTA 1000; Hard, outdoor; 15 February 2025 – 21 February 2026	–	1R	Bye			
Dubai Open; Dubai, UAE; WTA 1000; Hard, outdoor; 15 February 2025 – 21 February 2026	14	2R	(Australia) Kimberly Birrell (Q)	94	Win	6–1, 6–2
Dubai Open; Dubai, UAE; WTA 1000; Hard, outdoor; 15 February 2025 – 21 February 2026	15	3R	(Croatia) Antonia Ružić (LL)	67	Loss	7–5, 4–6, 0–1 ret
Indian Wells Open; Indian Wells, United States; WTA 1000; Hard, outdoor; 4 March 2026 – 15 March 2026	–	1R	Bye			
Indian Wells Open; Indian Wells, United States; WTA 1000; Hard, outdoor; 4 March 2026 – 15 March 2026	16	2R	(United States) Hailey Baptiste	43	Win	7–6^{(7–5)}, 2–6, 6–2
Indian Wells Open; Indian Wells, United States; WTA 1000; Hard, outdoor; 4 March 2026 – 15 March 2026	17	3R	(Ukraine) Marta Kostyuk (28)	28	Win	6–4, 6–4
Indian Wells Open; Indian Wells, United States; WTA 1000; Hard, outdoor; 4 March 2026 – 15 March 2026	18	4R	(United Kingdom) Sonay Kartal	54	Win	6–4, 4–3 ret
Indian Wells Open; Indian Wells, United States; WTA 1000; Hard, outdoor; 4 March 2026 – 15 March 2026	19	QF	(United States) Jessica Pegula (5)	5	Win	6–1, 7–6^{(7–4)}
Indian Wells Open; Indian Wells, United States; WTA 1000; Hard, outdoor; 4 March 2026 – 15 March 2026	20	SF	(Ukraine) Elina Svitolina (9)	9	Win	7–5, 6–4
Indian Wells Open; Indian Wells, United States; WTA 1000; Hard, outdoor; 4 March 2026 – 15 March 2026	21	F	Aryna Sabalenka (1)	1	Loss	6–3, 3–6, 6–7^{(6–8)}
Miami Open; Miami, United States; WTA 1000; Hard, outdoor; 17 March 2026 – 29 March 2026	–	1R	Bye			
Miami Open; Miami, United States; WTA 1000; Hard, outdoor; 17 March 2026 – 29 March 2026	22	2R	(Kazakhstan) Yulia Putintseva	75	Win	6–3, 6–3
Miami Open; Miami, United States; WTA 1000; Hard, outdoor; 17 March 2026 – 29 March 2026	23	3R	(Ukraine) Marta Kostyuk (27)	28	Win	6–3, 6–4
Miami Open; Miami, United States; WTA 1000; Hard, outdoor; 17 March 2026 – 29 March 2026	24	4R	(Australia) Talia Gibson (Q)	68	Win	6–2, 6–2
Miami Open; Miami, United States; WTA 1000; Hard, outdoor; 17 March 2026 – 29 March 2026	25	QF	(United States) Jessica Pegula (5)	5	Win	2–6, 6–3, 6–4
Miami Open; Miami, United States; WTA 1000; Hard, outdoor; 17 March 2026 – 29 March 2026	26	SF	Aryna Sabalenka (1)	1	Loss	4–6, 3–6
Stuttgart Open; Stuttgart, Germany; WTA 500; Clay, indoor; 13 April 2026 – 19 April 2026	–	1R	Bye			
Stuttgart Open; Stuttgart, Germany; WTA 500; Clay, indoor; 13 April 2026 – 19 April 2026	27	2R	Diana Shnaider	19	Win	6–3, 6–4
Stuttgart Open; Stuttgart, Germany; WTA 500; Clay, indoor; 13 April 2026 – 19 April 2026	28	QF	(Canada) Leylah Fernandez	25	Win	6–7^{(5–7)}, 6–4, 7–6^{(8–6)}
Stuttgart Open; Stuttgart, Germany; WTA 500; Clay, indoor; 13 April 2026 – 19 April 2026	29	SF	Mirra Andreeva (6)	9	Win	7–5, 6–1
Stuttgart Open; Stuttgart, Germany; WTA 500; Clay, indoor; 13 April 2026 – 19 April 2026	30	W	(Czech Republic) Karolína Muchová (7)	12	Win (2)	7–5, 6–1
Madrid Open; Madrid, Spain; WTA 1000; Clay, outdoor; 21 April 2026 – 3 May 2026	–	1R	Bye			
Madrid Open; Madrid, Spain; WTA 1000; Clay, outdoor; 21 April 2026 – 3 May 2026	31	2R	(Romania) Elena-Gabriela Ruse	71	Win	4–6, 6–3, 7–5
Madrid Open; Madrid, Spain; WTA 1000; Clay, outdoor; 21 April 2026 – 3 May 2026	32	3R	(China) Zheng Qinwen (32)	36	Win	4–6, 6–4, 6–3
Madrid Open; Madrid, Spain; WTA 1000; Clay, outdoor; 21 April 2026 – 3 May 2026	33	4R	(Austria) Anastasia Potapova (LL)	56	Loss	6–7^{(8–10)}, 4–6
Italian Open; Rome, Italy; WTA 1000; Clay, outdoor; 4 May 2026 – 17 May 2026	–	1R	Bye			
Italian Open; Rome, Italy; WTA 1000; Clay, outdoor; 4 May 2026 – 17 May 2026	34	2R	(Greece) Maria Sakkari	47	Win	6–4, 6–1
Italian Open; Rome, Italy; WTA 1000; Clay, outdoor; 4 May 2026 – 17 May 2026	35	3R	(Philippines) Alexandra Eala	42	Win	6–4, 6–3
Italian Open; Rome, Italy; WTA 1000; Clay, outdoor; 4 May 2026 – 17 May 2026	36	4R	(Czech Republic) Karolína Plíšková (PR)	134	Win	6–0, 6–2
Italian Open; Rome, Italy; WTA 1000; Clay, outdoor; 4 May 2026 – 17 May 2026	37	QF	(Ukraine) Elina Svitolina (7)	10	Loss	6–2, 4–6, 4–6
French Open; Paris, France; Grand Slam; Clay, outdoor; 24 May 2026 – 7 June 2026
French Open; Paris, France; Grand Slam; Clay, outdoor; 24 May 2026 – 7 June 2026	38	1R	(Slovenia) Veronika Erjavec	84	Win	6–2, 6–2
French Open; Paris, France; Grand Slam; Clay, outdoor; 24 May 2026 – 7 June 2026	39	2R	(Ukraine) Yulia Starodubtseva	55	Loss	6–3, 1–6, 6–7^{(4–10)}
Queen's Club Championships; London, United Kingdom; WTA 500; Grass, outdoor; 8 June 2026 – 14 June 2026	–	1R	Bye			
Queen's Club Championships; London, United Kingdom; WTA 500; Grass, outdoor; 8 June 2026 – 14 June 2026	40	2R	(Germany) Tatjana Maria (Q)	52	Win	6–7^{(4–7)}, 7–5, 6–0
Queen's Club Championships; London, United Kingdom; WTA 500; Grass, outdoor; 8 June 2026 – 14 June 2026	41	QF	(United Kingdom) Katie Boulter (WC)	73	Loss	5–7, 6–2, 4–6
German Open; Berlin, Germany; WTA 500; Grass, outdoor; 15 June 2026 – 21 June 2026	–	1R	Bye			
German Open; Berlin, Germany; WTA 500; Grass, outdoor; 15 June 2026 – 21 June 2026	42	2R	(Philippines) Alexandra Eala (WC)	35	Loss	5–7, 4–6
Wimbledon; London, United Kingdom; Grand Slam; Grass, outdoor; 29 June 2026 – 12 July 2026	43	1R	(France) Lois Boisson	154	Win	6–4, 1–6, 6–3
Wimbledon; London, United Kingdom; Grand Slam; Grass, outdoor; 29 June 2026 – 12 July 2026	44	2R	(United States) Caty McNally	50	Win	6–1, 6–2
Wimbledon; London, United Kingdom; Grand Slam; Grass, outdoor; 29 June 2026 – 12 July 2026	45	3R	(Belgium) Elise Mertens (25)	27	Loss	6–7^{(4–7)}, 1–6
Canadian Open; Toronto, Canada; WTA 1000; Hard, outdoor; 1 August 2026 – 13 August 2026	–	1R	Bye			
Canadian Open; Toronto, Canada; WTA 1000; Hard, outdoor; 1 August 2026 – 13 August 2026	46	2R	(Australia) Daria Kasatkina	61	Win	6–3, 5–7, 6–4
Canadian Open; Toronto, Canada; WTA 1000; Hard, outdoor; 1 August 2026 – 13 August 2026	47	3R	(United States) Ann Li (28)	31	Win	6–2, 7–5
Canadian Open; Toronto, Canada; WTA 1000; Hard, outdoor; 1 August 2026 – 13 August 2026	48	4R	Liudmila Samsonova	55	Win	6–4, 4–6, 6–4
Canadian Open; Toronto, Canada; WTA 1000; Hard, outdoor; 1 August 2026 – 13 August 2026	49	QF	(Japan) Naomi Osaka (11)	13	Win	4–6, 7–6^{(7–5)}, 6–4
Canadian Open; Toronto, Canada; WTA 1000; Hard, outdoor; 1 August 2026 – 13 August 2026	50	SF	(United States) Coco Gauff (4)	4	Win	5–7, 6–2, 6–2
Canadian Open; Toronto, Canada; WTA 1000; Hard, outdoor; 1 August 2026 – 13 August 2026	51	F	(Poland) Iga Świątek (7)	8	Loss	2–6, 3–6
Cincinnati Open; Mason, United States; WTA 1000; Hard, outdoor; 13 August 2026 – 23 August 2026	–	1R	Bye			
Cincinnati Open; Mason, United States; WTA 1000; Hard, outdoor; 13 August 2026 – 23 August 2026	52	2R	(United States) Taylor Townsend	94	Win	6–3, 6–4
Cincinnati Open; Mason, United States; WTA 1000; Hard, outdoor; 13 August 2026 – 23 August 2026	53	3R	(Poland) Magdalena Fręch	41	Win	6–4, 7–6^{(7–2)}
Cincinnati Open; Mason, United States; WTA 1000; Hard, outdoor; 13 August 2026 – 23 August 2026	54	4R	Diana Shnaider (14)	14	Win	6–4, 6–4
Cincinnati Open; Mason, United States; WTA 1000; Hard, outdoor; 13 August 2026 – 23 August 2026	55	QF	(Poland) Iga Świątek (7)	5	Loss	1–4 ret.
US Open; New York City, United States; Grand Slam; Hard, outdoor; 30 August 2026 – September 2026
US Open; New York City, United States; Grand Slam; Hard, outdoor; 30 August 2026 – September 2026	56	1R	(United States) Thea Frodin (WC)	585	Win	6–3, 6–4
US Open; New York City, United States; Grand Slam; Hard, outdoor; 30 August 2026 – September 2026	57	2R	(Spain) Jéssica Bouzas Maneiro	105	Win	6–2, 6–4
US Open; New York City, United States; Grand Slam; Hard, outdoor; 30 August 2026 – September 2026	58	3R	(Ukraine) Yulia Starodubtseva	58	Win	7–6^{(8–6)}, 6–3
US Open; New York City, United States; Grand Slam; Hard, outdoor; 30 August 2026 – September 2026	59	4R	(Japan) Naomi Osaka (13)	13	Win	6–1, 6–4
US Open; New York City, United States; Grand Slam; Hard, outdoor; 30 August 2026 – September 2026	60	QF	(China) Zheng Qinwen (Q)	121	Win	3–6, 6–1, 6–4
US Open; New York City, United States; Grand Slam; Hard, outdoor; 30 August 2026 – September 2026	61	SF	(United States) Coco Gauff (4)	4	Win	3–6, 6–4, 6–4
US Open; New York City, United States; Grand Slam; Hard, outdoor; 30 August 2026 – September 2026	62	W	Aryna Sabalenka (1)	1	Win (3)	6–4, 5–7, 6–2
China Open; Beijing, China; WTA 1000; Hard, outdoor; 28 September 2026 – 11 October 2026	–	1R	Bye			
China Open; Beijing, China; WTA 1000; Hard, outdoor; 28 September 2026 – 11 October 2026	63	2R	(Armenia) Alina Charaeva	118	Loss	6–3, 4–6, 3–6
Ningbo Open; Ningbo, China; WTA 500; Hard, outdoors; 19 October 2026 – 25 October 2026	–	1R	Bye			
Ningbo Open; Ningbo, China; WTA 500; Hard, outdoors; 19 October 2026 – 25 October 2026	64	2R	(Uzbekistan) Polina Kudermetova (Q)	105	Win	5–0 ret.
Ningbo Open; Ningbo, China; WTA 500; Hard, outdoors; 19 October 2026 – 25 October 2026	65	QF	(Poland) Katarzyna Kawa (Q)	128	Win	6–1, 3–6, 6–1
Ningbo Open; Ningbo, China; WTA 500; Hard, outdoors; 19 October 2026 – 25 October 2026	66	SF	Diana Shnaider (6)	13	Win	6–3, 7–5
Ningbo Open; Ningbo, China; WTA 500; Hard, outdoors; 19 October 2026 – 25 October 2026	67	W	(Canada) Leylah Fernandez	30	Win (4)	6–2, 6–2
Pan Pacific Open; Tokyo, Japan; WTA 500; Hard, outdoors; 26 October 2026 – 1 November 2026	–	1R	Bye			
Pan Pacific Open; Tokyo, Japan; WTA 500; Hard, outdoors; 26 October 2026 – 1 November 2026	68	2R	(Kazakhstan) Yulia Putintseva (Q)	67	Win	6–2, 6–3
Pan Pacific Open; Tokyo, Japan; WTA 500; Hard, outdoors; 26 October 2026 – 1 November 2026	–	QF	(Canada) Leylah Fernandez	23	walkover	

== Schedule ==
This is Rybakina's current 2026 schedule (subject to change).

=== Singles schedule ===
Key
W	F	SF	QF	#R	RR

(W) winner; (F) finalist; (SF) semifinalist; (QF) quarterfinalist; (#R) rounds 4, 3, 2, 1; (RR) round-robin stage.

Date	Tournament	Location	Tier	Surface	Prev. result	Prev. points	New points	Result
4 January 2026 – 11 January 2026	Brisbane International	Australia	WTA 500	Hard	A	(150)^{†}	108	Quarterfinals lost to (Czech Republic) Karolína Muchová, 2–6, 6–2, 4–6
18 January 2026 – 1 February 2026	Australian Open	Australia	Grand Slam	Hard	4R	240	2000	Winner defeated Aryna Sabalenka, 6–4, 4–6, 6–4
8 February 2026 – 14 February 2026	Qatar Open	Qatar	WTA 1000	Hard	QF	215	215	Quarterfinals lost to (Canada) Victoria Mboko, 5–7, 6–4, 4–6
15 February 2026 – 21 February 2026	Dubai Tennis Championships	UAE	WTA 1000	Hard	SF	390	120	Third round retired against (Croatia) Antonia Ružić, 7–5, 4–6, 0–1^{r}
4 March 2026 – 16 March 2026	Indian Wells Open	United States	WTA 1000	Hard	4R	120	650	Final lost to Aryna Sabalenka, 6–3, 3–6, 6–7^{(6–8)}
17 March 2026 – 29 March 2026	Miami Open	United States	WTA 1000	Hard	2R	10	390	Semifinals lost to Aryna Sabalenka, 4–6, 3–6
13 April 2026 – 19 April 2026	Stuttgart Open	Germany	WTA 500	Clay (i)	A	0	500	Winner defeated (Czech Republic) Karolína Muchová, 7–5, 6–1
21 April 2026 – 3 May 2026	Madrid Open	Spain	WTA 1000	Clay	3R	65	120	Fourth round lost to (Austria) Anastasia Potapova, 6–7^{(8–10)}, 4–6
7 May 2026 – 18 May 2026	Italian Open	Italy	WTA 1000	Clay	3R	65	215	Quarterfinals lost to (Ukraine) Elina Svitolina, 6–2, 4–6, 4–6
24 May 2026 – 7 June 2026	French Open	France	Grand Slam	Clay	4R	240	70	Second round lost to (Ukraine) Yulia Starodubtseva 6–3, 1–6, 6–7^{(4–10)}
8 June 2026 – 14 June 2026	Queen's Club Championships	Great Britain	WTA 500	Grass	QF	108	108	Quarterfinals lost to (United Kingdom) Katie Boulter; 5–7, 6–2, 4–6
15 June 2026 – 21 June 2026	German Open	Germany	WTA 500	Grass	QF	108	1	Second round lost to (Philippines) Alexandra Eala 5–7, 4–6
29 June 2026 – 12 July 2026	Wimbledon Championships	United Kingdom	Grand Slam	Grass	3R	130	130	Third round lost to (Belgium) Elise Mertens, 6–7^{(4–7)}, 1–6
2 August 2026 – 13 August 2026	Canadian Open	Canada	WTA 1000	Hard	SF	390	650	Final lost to (Poland) Iga Świątek, 2–6, 3–6
13 August 2026 – 23 August 2026	Cincinnati Open	United States	WTA 1000	Hard	SF	390	215	Quarterfinals retired against (Poland) Iga Świątek, 4–1^{r}
30 August 2026 – 13 September 2026	US Open	United States	Grand Slam	Hard	4R	240	2000	Winner defeated Aryna Sabalenka, 6–4, 5–7, 6–2
28 September 2026 – 11 October 2026	China Open	China	WTA 1000	Hard	3R	65	10	Second round lost to (United States) Alina Charaeva; 3–6, 6–1, 4–6
12 October 2026 – 18 October 2026	Wuhan Open	China	WTA 1000	Hard	QF	215	0	Withdrew
19 October 2026 – 25 October 2026	Ningbo Open	China	WTA 500	Hard	W	500	500	Winner defeated (Canada) Leylah Fernandez, 6–2, 6–2
26 October 2026 – 1 November 2026	Pan Pacific Open	Japan	WTA 500	Hard	SF	195	108	Quarterfinal, withdrew against Leylah Fernandez
8 Novewmber 2026 – 15 November 2026	WTA Finals	Saudi Arabia	WTA Finals	Hard	W	1500	0	Withdrew
Total year-end points						5,850	8,099	▲2,249

† Defending points from another tournament held in the same week.

== Yearly records ==
=== Head-to-head match-ups ===
Rybakina finished the 2026 season with a 54–14 (79%) WTA match win–loss record. Her record against players who were part of the WTA rankings top ten at the time of their meetings was 10–5 (67%). Bold indicates player was ranked top 10 at the time of at least one meeting. The following list is ordered by number of wins:

- (United States) **Jessica Pegula** 3–0
- Diana Shnaider 3–0
- (China) Zheng Qinwen 3–0
- (Canada) Leylah Fernandez 2–0
- (United States) **Coco Gauff** 2–0
- (Ukraine) Marta Kostyuk 2–0
- (Japan) Naomi Osaka 2–0
- (Kazakhstan) Yulia Putintseva 2–0
- **Mirra Andreeva** 1–0
- (Spain) Paula Badosa 1–0
- (United States) Hailey Baptiste 1–0
- (Australia) Kimberly Birrell 1–0
- (France) Loïs Boisson 1–0
- (Slovenia) Veronika Erjavec 1–0
- (Poland) Magdalena Fręch 1–0
- (Australia) Talia Gibson 1–0
- (France) Varvara Gracheva 1–0
- (Slovenia) Kaja Juvan 1–0
- (United Kingdom) Sonay Kartal 1–0
- (Australia) Daria Kasatkina 1–0
- (Poland) Katarzyna Kawa 1–0
- (Uzbekistan) Polina Kudermetova 1–0
- (United States) Ann Li 1–0
- (Spain) Jessica Bouzas Maneiro 1–0
- (Germany) Tatjana Maria 1–0
- (United States) Caty McNally 1–0
- (Czech Republic) Karolína Plíšková 1–0
- (Romania) Elena-Gabriela Ruse 1–0
- (Greece) Maria Sakkari 1–0
- Ludmilla Samsonova 1–0
- (United States) Taylor Townsend 1–0
- (United States) Thea Frodin 1–0
- (Czech Republic) Tereza Valentová 1–0
- (China) Wang Xinyu 1–0
- (China) Zhang Shuai 1–0
- (Philippines) Alexandra Eala 1–1
- (Belgium) Elise Mertens 1–1
- (Czech Republic) Karolína Muchová 1–1
- (Ukraine) Yulia Starodubtseva 1–1
- (Ukraine) **Elina Svitolina** 1–1
- **Aryna Sabalenka** 2–2
- (Poland) **Iga Świątek** 1–2
- (United Kingdom) Katie Boulter 0–1
- (United States) Alina Charaeva 0–1
- (Canada) Victoria Mboko 0–1
- (Austria) Anastasia Potapova 0–1
- (Croatia) Antonia Ružić 0–1

=== Top 10 record ===
Result	W–L	Opponent	Rk	Tournament	Surface	Rd	Score	Rk	Ref
Win	1–0	(Poland) Iga Świątek	2	Australian Open, Australia	Hard	QF	7–5, 6–1	5	
Win	2–0	(United States) Jessica Pegula	6	Australian Open, Australia	Hard	SF	6–3, 7–6^{(9–7)}	5	
Win	3–0	Aryna Sabalenka	**1**	Australian Open, Australia	Hard	F	6–4, 4–6, 6–4	5	
Win	4–0	(United States) Jessica Pegula	5	Indian Wells Open, US	Hard	QF	6–1, 7–6^{(7–4)}	3	
Win	5–0	(Ukraine) Elina Svitolina	9	Indian Wells Open, US	Hard	SF	7–5, 6–4	3	
Loss	5–1	Aryna Sabalenka	**1**	Indian Wells Open, US	Hard	F	6–3, 3–6, 6–7^{(6–8)}	3	
Win	6–1	(United States) Jessica Pegula	5	Miami Open, US	Hard	QF	2–6, 6–3, 6–4	2	
Loss	6–2	Aryna Sabalenka	**1**	Miami Open, US	Hard	SF	4–6, 3–6	2	
Win	7–2	Mirra Andreeva	9	Stuttgart Open, Germany	Clay (i)	SF	7–5, 6–1	2	
Loss	7–3	(Ukraine) Elina Svitolina	10	Italian Open, Italy	Clay	QF	6–2, 4–6, 4–6	2	
Win	8–3	(United States) Coco Gauff	4	Canadian Open, Canada	Hard	SF	5–7, 6–2, 6–2	2	
Loss	8–4	(Poland) Iga Świątek	8	Canadian Open, Canada	Hard	F	2–6, 3–6	2	
Loss	8–5	(Poland) Iga Świątek	5	Cincinnati Open, United States	Hard	QF	1–4 ret.	2	
Win	9–5	(United States) Coco Gauff	4	US Open, United States	Hard	SF	6–3, 4–6, 4–6	2	
Win	10–5	Aryna Sabalenka	**1**	US Open, United States	Hard	F	6–4, 5–7, 6–2	2	

- Key: (Rk) first use, opponent rank; (Rd) round; (Rk) 2nd use, player rank; (Ref) reference; (F) final; (SF) semifinal; (QF) quarterfinal; (#R) rounds 4, 3, 2, 1; (RR) round-robin stage; (Q#) qualifying rounds or stages (3), 2, 1.

=== Finals ===
==== Singles: 6 (4 titles, 2 runner-ups) ====
Legend Grand Slam tournaments (2–0) WTA Tour Championships (0–0) WTA 1000 (0–2) WTA 500 (2–0)	Finals by surface Hard (3–2) Clay (1–0)	Finals by setting Outdoor (3–2) Indoor (1–0)

Result	W–L	Date	Tournament	Tier	Surface	Opponent	Score
Win	1–0	Jan 2026	Australian Open, Australia	Grand Slam	Hard	Aryna Sabalenka	6–4, 4–6, 6–4
Loss	1–1	Mar 2026	Indian Wells Open, US	WTA 1000	Hard	Aryna Sabalenka	6–3, 3–6, 6–7^{(6–8)}
Win	2–1	Apr 2026	Stuttgart Open, Germany	WTA 500	Clay (i)	(Czech Republic) Karolína Muchová	7–5, 6–1
Loss	2–2	Jul 2026	Canadian Open, Canada	WTA 1000	Hard	(Poland) Iga Świątek	2–6, 3–6
Win	3–2	Sep 2026	US Open, United States	Grand Slam	Hard	Aryna Sabalenka	6–4, 5–7, 6–2
Win	4-2	Oct 2026	Ningbo Open, China	WTA 500	Hard	(Canada) Leylah Fernandez	6–2, 6–2

=== Earnings ===
- **Bold** font denotes tournament win and italic font denotes she finished as runner up.

**Singles**
Event	Prize money	Year-to-date
Brisbane International	$37,640	$37,640
**Australian Open**	**A$4,150,000**	$2,724,432
Qatar Open	$98,500	$2,822,932
Dubai Open	$49,250	$2,872,182
Indian Wells Open	$564,920	$3,437,102
Miami Open	$340,190	$3,777,292
**Stuttgart Open**	**$185,500**	$3,962,792
Madrid Open	$92,470	$4,055,262
Italian Open	$154,210	$4,209,472
French Open	€130,000	$4,361,640
Queen's Club Championships	$33,470	$4,395,110
Berlin Tennis Open	$17,795	$4,412,905
Wimbledon Championships	$247,800	$4,660,705
Canadian Open	$564,920	$5,225,625
Cincinnati Open	$154,210	$5,379,835
**US Open**	**$5,500,000**	$10,879,835
China Open	$36,110	$10,915,945
**Ningbo Open**	**$185,500**	$11,100,945
Pan Pacific Open	$33,475	$11,134,420
		$11,134,420
**Total**
		**$11,134,420**

Figures in United States dollars (USD) unless noted.

== See also ==
- 2026 WTA Tour
- Elena Rybakina career statistics
- 2026 Coco Gauff tennis season
- 2026 Aryna Sabalenka tennis season
- 2026 Mirra Andreeva tennis season
