= 2026 Brisbane International – Women's doubles =

Women's doubles
- 2026 Brisbane International

Final
- Champions: (Chinese Taipei) Hsieh Su-wei (Latvia) Jeļena Ostapenko
- Runners-up: (Spain) Cristina Bucșa (Australia) Ellen Perez
- Score: 6–2, 6–1

Details
- Draw: 16 (2 WC )
- Seeds: 8

Events
Singles	men	women
Doubles	men	women
- Brisbane International

Hsieh Su-wei and Jeļena Ostapenko defeated Cristina Bucșa and Ellen Perez in the final, 6–2, 6–1 to win the women's doubles tennis title at the 2026 Brisbane International. It was the pair's first title together, and the second Brisbane International title for both players, having previously won with different partners in 2020 for Hsieh and 2024 for Ostapenko.

Mirra Andreeva and Diana Shnaider were the reigning champions, but Shnaider did not participate this year. Andreeva partnered Ekaterina Alexandrova, but lost in the quarterfinals to Anna Danilina and Aleksandra Krunić.

== Seeds ==
1. (Chinese Taipei) Hsieh Su-wei / (Latvia) Jeļena Ostapenko (champions)
2. (Kazakhstan) Anna Danilina / (Serbia) Aleksandra Krunić (semifinals)
3. (Spain) Cristina Bucșa / (Australia) Ellen Perez (final)
4. Irina Khromacheva / Alexandra Panova (quarterfinals)

== Draw ==
Key

- Q = Qualifier
- WC = Wild card
- LL = Lucky loser
- Alt = Alternate
- ITF = ITF entry
- PR = Protected ranking
- SR = Special ranking
- SE = Special exempt
- JE = Junior exempt
- JR = Junior Accelerator Programme entrant
- CO = College Accelerator Programme entrant
- NG = Next Gen Accelerator Program entrant
- w/o = Walkover
- r = Retired
- d = Defaulted

=== Draw ===
First round
1	(Chinese Taipei) S-w Hsieh (Latvia) J Ostapenko	6	6
(Australia) O Gadecki (Slovakia) T Mihalíková	1	4
(Japan) E Hozumi (Chinese Taipei) F-h Wu	4	0
WC	(Australia) P Hon (Czech Republic) K Muchová	6	6
4	I Khromacheva; A Panova	7^{8}	6
(Czech Republic) L Nosková (Denmark) C Tauson	6^{6}	1
(Japan) M Kato (Hungary) F Stollár	6	2	[7]
(Ukraine) L Kichenok (Ukraine) N Kichenok	2	6	[10]
(Spain) P Badosa; A Sabalenka	7^{7}	7^{7}
L Samsonova (China) S Zhang	6^{2}	6^{3}
WC	(Australia) K Birrell (Australia) T Gibson	2	0
3	(Spain) C Bucșa (Australia) E Perez	6	6
(Chinese Taipei) H-c Chan (China) X Jiang	2	3
E Alexandrova; M Andreeva	6	6
(United States) S Kenin (United States) D Krawczyk	6^{5}	4
2	(Kazakhstan) A Danilina (Serbia) A Krunić	7^{7}	6

Quarterfinals
1	(Chinese Taipei) S-w Hsieh (Latvia) J Ostapenko	6	1	[10]
WC	(Australia) P Hon (Czech Republic) K Muchová	1	6	[6]
4	I Khromacheva; A Panova	2	7^{7}	[7]
(Ukraine) L Kichenok (Ukraine) N Kichenok	6	6^{2}	[10]
(Spain) P Badosa; A Sabalenka
3	(Spain) C Bucșa (Australia) E Perez	w/o
E Alexandrova; M Andreeva	1	3
2	(Kazakhstan) A Danilina (Serbia) A Krunić	6	6

Semifinals
1	(Chinese Taipei) S-w Hsieh (Latvia) J Ostapenko	6	6
(Ukraine) L Kichenok (Ukraine) N Kichenok	2	4
3	(Spain) C Bucșa (Australia) E Perez	6	4	[10]
2	(Kazakhstan) A Danilina (Serbia) A Krunić	3	6	[7]

Final
1	(Chinese Taipei) S-w Hsieh (Latvia) J Ostapenko	6	6
3	(Spain) C Bucșa (Australia) E Perez	2	1
