= 2026 Brisbane International – Men's doubles =

Men's doubles
- 2026 Brisbane International

Final
- Champions: (Portugal) Francisco Cabral (Austria) Lucas Miedler
- Runners-up: (United Kingdom) Julian Cash (United Kingdom) Lloyd Glasspool
- Score: 6–3, 3–6, [10–8]

Details
- Draw: 24 (2 WC )
- Seeds: 8

Events
Singles	men	women
Doubles	men	women
- Brisbane International

Francisco Cabral and Lucas Miedler defeated defending champions Julian Cash and Lloyd Glasspool in the final, 6–3, 3–6, [10–8] to win the men's doubles tennis title at the 2026 Brisbane International. It was the sixth ATP Tour title for Cabral and 11th for Miedler.

== Seeds ==
All seeds received a bye into the second round.

1. (United Kingdom) Julian Cash / (United Kingdom) Lloyd Glasspool (final)
2. (India) Yuki Bhambri / (Sweden) André Göransson (second round)
3. (Portugal) Francisco Cabral / (Austria) Lucas Miedler (champions)
4. (Monaco) Hugo Nys / (Netherlands) Sem Verbeek (quarterfinals)
5. (France) Manuel Guinard / (United Kingdom) Luke Johnson (quarterfinals)
6. (France) Sadio Doumbia / (France) Fabien Reboul (semifinals)
7. (United States) Evan King / (Australia) John Peers (second round)
8. (United States) Robert Cash / (United States) JJ Tracy (second round)

== Draw ==
Key

- Q = Qualifier
- WC = Wild card
- LL = Lucky loser
- Alt = Alternate
- ITF = ITF entry
- PR = Protected ranking
- SR = Special ranking
- SE = Special exempt
- JE = Junior exempt
- JR = Junior Accelerator Programme entrant
- CO = College Accelerator Programme entrant
- NG = Next Gen Accelerator Program entrant
- w/o = Walkover
- r = Retired
- d = Defaulted

=== Finals ===
Semifinals
1	(United Kingdom) Julian Cash (United Kingdom) Lloyd Glasspool	6	6
(Czech Republic) Tomáš Macháč (Czech Republic) Matěj Vocel	3	3
3	(Portugal) Francisco Cabral (Austria) Lucas Miedler	7^{7}	4	[10]
6	(France) Sadio Doumbia (France) Fabien Reboul	6^{3}	6	[7]

Final
1	(United Kingdom) Julian Cash (United Kingdom) Lloyd Glasspool	3	6	[8]
3	(Portugal) Francisco Cabral (Austria) Lucas Miedler	6	3	[10]

=== Top half ===
First round
(Poland) K Majchrzak (Argentina) C Ugo Carabelli	4	6	[6]
Alt	(United States) T Paul (United States) E Quinn	6	4	[10]
(Germany) J Schnaitter (Germany) M Wallner	1	3
(United States) S Korda (United States) B Nakashima	6	6
(Belgium) R Collignon (Monaco) V Vacherot	6	6
(United Kingdom) J Fearnley (Ecuador) D Hidalgo	3	2
(Czech Republic) T Macháč (Czech Republic) M Vocel	7^{9}	7^{7}
(Brazil) M Melo (Brazil) F Romboli	6^{7}	6^{1}

Second round
1	(United Kingdom) J Cash (United Kingdom) L Glasspool	6^{4}	6	[10]
Alt	(United States) T Paul (United States) E Quinn	7^{7}	4	[0]
(United States) S Korda (United States) B Nakashima	6	6^{6}	[11]
7	(United States) E King (Australia) J Peers	4	7^{8}	[9]
4	(Monaco) H Nys (Netherlands) S Verbeek	6	6
(Belgium) R Collignon (Monaco) V Vacherot	4	4
(Czech Republic) T Macháč (Czech Republic) M Vocel	7^{7}	4	[10]
8	(United States) R Cash (United States) JJ Tracy	6^{4}	6	[7]

Quarterfinals
1	(United Kingdom) J Cash (United Kingdom) L Glasspool	w/o
(United States) S Korda (United States) B Nakashima
4	(Monaco) H Nys (Netherlands) S Verbeek	6	5	[7]
(Czech Republic) T Macháč (Czech Republic) M Vocel	3	7	[10]

Semifinals
1	(United Kingdom) J Cash (United Kingdom) L Glasspool	6	6
(Czech Republic) T Macháč (Czech Republic) M Vocel	3	3

=== Bottom half ===
First round
(Mexico) S González (Netherlands) J-J Rojer	3	6	[7]
(Brazil) M Demoliner (France) G Mpetshi Perricard	6	4	[10]
(Uruguay) A Behar (Belgium) J Vliegen	6	7^{8}
(Australia) A Popyrin (Canada) D Shapovalov	3	6^{6}
(Australia) M Ebden (United States) R Ram	7	4	[8]
WC	(Australia) T Kokkinakis (Australia) N Kyrgios	5	6	[10]
WC	(Australia) J Duckworth (Australia) C Hewitt	4	5
(Brazil) O Luz (Brazil) R Matos	6	7

Second round
5	(France) M Guinard (United Kingdom) L Johnson	6^{1}	6	[10]
(Brazil) M Demoliner (France) G Mpetshi Perricard	7^{7}	2	[3]
(Uruguay) A Behar (Belgium) J Vliegen	3	6^{4}
3	(Portugal) F Cabral (Austria) L Miedler	6	7^{7}
6	(France) S Doumbia (France) F Reboul	6	1	[10]
WC	(Australia) T Kokkinakis (Australia) N Kyrgios	0	6	[6]
(Brazil) O Luz (Brazil) R Matos	7	6
2	(India) Y Bhambri (Sweden) A Göransson	5	4

Quarterfinals
5	(France) M Guinard (United Kingdom) L Johnson	4	4
3	(Portugal) F Cabral (Austria) L Miedler	6	6
6	(France) S Doumbia (France) F Reboul	6	6^{8}	[12]
(Brazil) O Luz (Brazil) R Matos	4	7^{10}	[10]

Semifinals
3	(Portugal) F Cabral (Austria) L Miedler	7^{7}	4	[10]
6	(France) S Doumbia (France) F Reboul	6^{3}	6	[7]
