= 2026 BNP Paribas Open – Mixed doubles =

Tennis tournament event

Mixed doubles
- 2026 BNP Paribas Open

Final
- Champions: (Switzerland) Belinda Bencic (Italy) Flavio Cobolli
- Runners-up: (Canada) Gabriela Dabrowski (United Kingdom) Lloyd Glasspool
- Score: 6–3, 2–6, [10–7]
- Date: 14 March 2026

Details
- Draw: 16

Events
Singles	men	women
Doubles	men	women	mixed
- Indian Wells Open

Belinda Bencic and Flavio Cobolli won the mixed doubles invitational title at the 2026 BNP Paribas Open, defeating Gabriela Dabrowski and Lloyd Glasspool in the final, 6–3, 2–6, [10–7].

Sara Errani and Andrea Vavassori were the defending champions but lost in the semifinals to Bencic and Cobolli.

== Seeds ==
1. (Canada) Gabriela Dabrowski / (United Kingdom) Lloyd Glasspool (final)
2. (Serbia) Aleksandra Krunić / (Croatia) Mate Pavić (first round)
3. (Brazil) Luisa Stefani / (El Salvador) Marcelo Arévalo (quarterfinals)
4. (Italy) Sara Errani / (Italy) Andrea Vavassori (semifinals)

== Draw ==
Key

- Q = Qualifier
- WC = Wild card
- LL = Lucky loser
- Alt = Alternate
- ITF = ITF entry
- PR = Protected ranking
- SR = Special ranking
- SE = Special exempt
- JE = Junior exempt
- JR = Junior Accelerator Programme entrant
- CO = College Accelerator Programme entrant
- NG = Next Gen Accelerator Program entrant
- w/o = Walkover
- r = Retired
- d = Defaulted

=== Draw ===
First round
1	(Canada) G Dabrowski (United Kingdom) L Glasspool	7	0
(United States) N Melichar-Martinez; A Rublev	5	0^{r}
(New Zealand) E Routliffe (Germany) T Pütz	6	6^{4}	[10]
WC	(Canada) L Fernandez (Australia) J Peers	4	7^{7}	[8]
3	(Brazil) L Stefani (El Salvador) M Arévalo	6	6
(Australia) E Perez (Germany) K Krawietz	2	2
(Kazakhstan) A Danilina; K Khachanov	5	5
WC	(Greece) M Sakkari (Greece) S Tsitsipas	7	7
(Netherlands) D Schuurs (United Kingdom) J Cash	6	6
WC	(United States) V Williams (United States) C Harrison	4	2
(United States) D Krawczyk (United Kingdom) N Skupski	6	3	[8]
4	(Italy) S Errani (Italy) A Vavassori	4	6	[10]
(Latvia) J Ostapenko (United States) E King	4	3
(Switzerland) B Bencic (Italy) F Cobolli	6	6
WC	(France) K Mladenovic (France) M Guinard	7	7^{9}
2	(Serbia) A Krunić (Croatia) M Pavić	5	6^{7}

Quarterfinals
1	(Canada) G Dabrowski (United Kingdom) L Glasspool	7	6
(New Zealand) E Routliffe (Germany) T Pütz	5	4
3	(Brazil) L Stefani (El Salvador) M Arévalo	5	6^{0}
WC	(Greece) M Sakkari (Greece) S Tsitsipas	7	7^{7}
(Netherlands) D Schuurs (United Kingdom) J Cash	2	4
4	(Italy) S Errani (Italy) A Vavassori	6	6
(Switzerland) B Bencic (Italy) F Cobolli	6	6
WC	(France) K Mladenovic (France) M Guinard	3	4

Semifinals
1	(Canada) G Dabrowski (United Kingdom) L Glasspool	6	4	[13]
WC	(Greece) M Sakkari (Greece) S Tsitsipas	2	6	[11]
4	(Italy) S Errani (Italy) A Vavassori	3	3
(Switzerland) B Bencic (Italy) F Cobolli	6	6

Final
1	(Canada) G Dabrowski (United Kingdom) L Glasspool	3	6	[7]
(Switzerland) B Bencic (Italy) F Cobolli	6	2	[10]
