= 2026 Brisbane International – Men's singles =

Men's singles
- 2026 Brisbane International

Final
- Champion: Daniil Medvedev
- Runner-up: (United States) Brandon Nakashima
- Score: 6–2, 7–6^{(7–1)}

Details
- Draw: 32 (6 Q / 3 WC )
- Seeds: 8

Events
Singles	men	women
Doubles	men	women
- Brisbane International

Daniil Medvedev defeated Brandon Nakashima in the final, 6–2, 7–6^{(7–1)} to win the men's singles tennis title at the 2026 Brisbane International. It was his 22nd ATP Tour title.

Jiří Lehečka was the defending champion, but retired in the second round against Sebastian Korda.

== Seeds ==
1. Daniil Medvedev (champion)
2. (Spain) Alejandro Davidovich Fokina (first round)
3. (Czech Republic) Jiří Lehečka (second round, retired)
4. (United States) Tommy Paul (first round)
5. (Canada) Denis Shapovalov (first round)
6. (Brazil) João Fonseca (withdrew)
7. (United Kingdom) Cameron Norrie (second round)
8. (United States) Learner Tien (second round)

== Draw ==
Key

- Q = Qualifier
- WC = Wild card
- LL = Lucky loser
- Alt = Alternate
- ITF = ITF entry
- PR = Protected ranking
- SR = Special ranking
- SE = Special exempt
- JE = Junior exempt
- JR = Junior Accelerator Programme entrant
- CO = College Accelerator Programme entrant
- NG = Next Gen Accelerator Program entrant
- w/o = Walkover
- r = Retired
- d = Defaulted

=== Finals ===
Semifinals
1	Daniil Medvedev	6	6
(United States) Alex Michelsen	4	2
(United States) Aleksandar Kovacevic	6^{4}	4
(United States) Brandon Nakashima	7^{7}	6

Final
1	Daniil Medvedev	6	7^{7}
(United States) Brandon Nakashima	2	6^{1}

=== Top half ===
First round
1	D Medvedev	6	6
(Hungary) M Fucsovics	2	3
WC	(Australia) A Vukic	2	2
(United States) F Tiafoe	6	6
LL	(Poland) K Majchrzak	7^{7}	6
(Germany) D Altmaier	6^{4}	0
(United States) R Opelka	6	7
Q	(Australia) D Sweeny	3	5
3	(Czech Republic) J Lehečka	6	6^{5}	6
(Czech Republic) T Macháč	4	7^{7}	2
(Monaco) V Vacherot	6^{1}	3
(United States) S Korda	7^{7}	6
Q	(Australia) J Duckworth	7^{7}	6^{2}	3
(United States) A Michelsen	6^{4}	7^{7}	6
(Argentina) C Ugo Carabelli	6^{4}	3
8	(United States) L Tien	7^{7}	6

Second round
1	D Medvedev	6	6
(United States) F Tiafoe	3	2
LL	(Poland) K Majchrzak	6^{2}	7^{9}	7^{10}
(United States) R Opelka	7^{7}	6^{7}	6^{8}
3	(Czech Republic) J Lehečka	3	2^{r}
(United States) S Korda	6	1
(United States) A Michelsen	6	6
8	(United States) L Tien	4	2

Quarterfinals
1	D Medvedev	6^{4}	6	6
LL	(Poland) K Majchrzak	7^{7}	3	2
(United States) S Korda	3	6^{7}
(United States) A Michelsen	6	7^{9}

Semifinals
1	D Medvedev	6	6
(United States) A Michelsen	4	2

=== Bottom half ===
First round
7	(United Kingdom) C Norrie	1	7^{8}	7
(France) U Humbert	6	6^{6}	5
WC	(Australia) N Kyrgios	3	4
(United States) A Kovacevic	6	6
Q	(Australia) R Hijikata	6	6
WC	(Australia) A Walton	3	2
(France) G Mpetshi Perricard	7^{7}	3	7^{8}
4	(United States) T Paul	6^{2}	6	6^{6}
5	(Canada) D Shapovalov	4	2
Q	(Belgium) R Collignon	6	6
(Bulgaria) G Dimitrov	6	6
Q	(Spain) P Carreño Busta	3	2
(Australia) A Popyrin	7	3	4
Q	(France) Q Halys	5	6	6
(United States) B Nakashima	7^{7}	6
2	(Spain) A Davidovich Fokina	6^{4}	4

Second round
7	(United Kingdom) C Norrie	6^{4}	6	4
(United States) A Kovacevic	7^{7}	4	6
Q	(Australia) R Hijikata	6	6^{5}	6^{4}
(France) G Mpetshi Perricard	4	7^{7}	7^{7}
Q	(Belgium) R Collignon	7^{7}	6
(Bulgaria) G Dimitrov	6^{1}	3
Q	(France) Q Halys	2	4
(United States) B Nakashima	6	6

Quarterfinals
(United States) A Kovacevic	7^{7}	4	6
(France) G Mpetshi Perricard	6^{3}	6	3
Q	(Belgium) R Collignon	3	3
(United States) B Nakashima	6	6

Semifinals
(United States) A Kovacevic	6^{4}	4
(United States) B Nakashima	7^{7}	6

== Qualifying ==
=== Seeds ===
1. (Italy) Matteo Arnaldi (qualifying competition, withdrew, lucky loser)
2. (Poland) Kamil Majchrzak (qualifying competition, lucky loser)
3. (France) Térence Atmane (qualifying competition)
4. (France) Arthur Cazaux (qualifying competition, retired)
5. (United States) Ethan Quinn (qualifying competition)
6. (United Kingdom) Jacob Fearnley (first round)
7. (Italy) Mattia Bellucci (first round)
8. (Austria) Filip Misolic (first round)
9. (Belgium) Raphaël Collignon (qualified)
10. (Australia) James Duckworth (qualified)
11. (United States) Eliot Spizzirri (first round)
12. (Spain) Roberto Bautista Agut (withdrew)

=== Qualifiers ===
1. (Australia) Rinky Hijikata
2. (France) Quentin Halys
3. (Australia) James Duckworth
4. (Spain) Pablo Carreño Busta
5. (Belgium) Raphaël Collignon
6. (Australia) Dane Sweeny

=== Lucky losers ===
1. (Italy) Matteo Arnaldi (withdrew)
2. (Poland) Kamil Majchrzak

=== Draw ===
==== First qualifier ====
First round
1	(Italy) Matteo Arnaldi	6	5	7^{7}
(France) Hugo Gaston	1	7	6^{5}
WC	(Australia) Rinky Hijikata	6	6
8	(Austria) Filip Misolic	3	3

Qualifying competition
1	(Italy) Matteo Arnaldi
WC	(Australia) Rinky Hijikata	w/o

==== Second qualifier ====
First round
2	(Poland) Kamil Majchrzak	6	7
WC	(Australia) Cruz Hewitt	4	5
(France) Quentin Halys	6	6
11	(United States) Eliot Spizzirri	4	3

Qualifying competition
2	(Poland) Kamil Majchrzak	6	6^{5}	4
(France) Quentin Halys	1	7^{7}	6

==== Third qualifier ====
First round
3	(France) Térence Atmane	6	7^{7}
(Germany) Yannick Hanfmann	4	6^{3}
(Australia) Tristan Schoolkate	3	2
10	(Australia) James Duckworth	6	6

Qualifying competition
3	(France) Térence Atmane	6^{4}	2
10	(Australia) James Duckworth	7^{7}	6

==== Fourth qualifier ====
First round
4	(France) Arthur Cazaux	6	6
NG	(Spain) Martín Landaluce	3	2
(Spain) Pablo Carreño Busta	6	2	7^{7}
7	(Italy) Mattia Bellucci	4	6	6^{3}

Qualifying competition
4	(France) Arthur Cazaux	3^{r}
(Spain) Pablo Carreño Busta	5

==== Fifth qualifier ====
First round
5	(United States) Ethan Quinn	4	6	6
(France) Benjamin Bonzi	6	3	3
(Kazakhstan) Alexander Shevchenko	5	4
9	(Belgium) Raphaël Collignon	7	6

Qualifying competition
5	(United States) Ethan Quinn	5	3
9	(Belgium) Raphaël Collignon	7	6

==== Sixth qualifier ====
First round
6	(United Kingdom) Jacob Fearnley	1	6^{4}
WC	(Australia) Dane Sweeny	6	7^{7}
WC	(Australia) Christopher O'Connell	6	6
Alt	(Georgia (country)) Nikoloz Basilashvili	2	3

Qualifying competition
WC	(Australia) Dane Sweeny	6^{4}	6	6
WC	(Australia) Christopher O'Connell	7^{7}	3	4
