= 2026 Brisbane International – Women's singles =

Women's singles
- 2026 Brisbane International

Final
- Champion: Aryna Sabalenka
- Runner-up: (Ukraine) Marta Kostyuk
- Score: 6–4, 6–3

Details
- Draw: 48 (6 Q / 4 WC )
- Seeds: 16

Events
Singles	men	women
Doubles	men	women
- Brisbane International

Defending champion Aryna Sabalenka defeated Marta Kostyuk in the final, 6–4, 6–3 to win the women's singles tennis title at the 2026 Brisbane International. She did not lose a set en route to her 22nd WTA Tour singles title. Sabalenka was the third woman to defend the title, after Serena Williams in 2014 and Karolína Plíšková in 2020, and the first to reach three consecutive finals at the tournament since it was established in 2009.

== Seeds ==
All seeds received a bye into the second round.

1. Aryna Sabalenka (champion)
2. (United States) Amanda Anisimova (third round)
3. (Kazakhstan) Elena Rybakina (quarterfinals)
4. (United States) Jessica Pegula (semifinals)
5. (United States) Madison Keys (quarterfinals)
6. Mirra Andreeva (quarterfinals)
7. Ekaterina Alexandrova (third round)
8. (Denmark) Clara Tauson (second round)
9. (Czech Republic) Linda Nosková (third round)
10. Liudmila Samsonova (quarterfinals)
11. (Czech Republic) Karolína Muchová (semifinals)
12. Diana Shnaider (third round)
13. (Canada) Leylah Fernandez (second round)
14. (Latvia) Jeļena Ostapenko (second round)
15. (Spain) Paula Badosa (third round)
16. (Ukraine) Marta Kostyuk (final)

Click on the seed number of a player to go to their draw section.

== Draw ==
Key

- Q = Qualifier
- WC = Wild card
- LL = Lucky loser
- Alt = Alternate
- ITF = ITF entry
- PR = Protected ranking
- SR = Special ranking
- SE = Special exempt
- JE = Junior exempt
- JR = Junior Accelerator Programme entrant
- CO = College Accelerator Programme entrant
- NG = Next Gen Accelerator Program entrant
- w/o = Walkover
- r = Retired
- d = Defaulted

=== Finals ===
Quarterfinals
1	Aryna Sabalenka	6	6
5	(United States) Madison Keys	3	3
3	(Kazakhstan) Elena Rybakina	2	6	4
11	(Czech Republic) Karolína Muchová	6	2	6
10	Liudmila Samsonova	3	6^{3}
4	(United States) Jessica Pegula	6	7^{7}
6	Mirra Andreeva	6^{7}	3
16	(Ukraine) Marta Kostyuk	7^{9}	6

Semifinals
1	Aryna Sabalenka	6	6
11	(Czech Republic) Karolína Muchová	3	4
4	(United States) Jessica Pegula	0	3
16	(Ukraine) Marta Kostyuk	6	6

Final
1	Aryna Sabalenka	6	6
16	(Ukraine) Marta Kostyuk	4	3

=== Top half ===
==== Section 1 ====
First round
Q	(Hungary) A Bondár	6	6^{4}	2
(Spain) C Bucșa	4	7^{7}	6
(Romania) S Cîrstea	6	6
A Pavlyuchenkova	3	1
(Australia) D Kasatkina	5	6	4
(Austria) A Potapova	7	4	6
(Colombia) E Arango	1	3
(United States) M Kessler	6	6

Second round
1	A Sabalenka	6	6
(Spain) C Bucșa	0	1
(Romania) S Cîrstea	6	7^{7}
14	(Latvia) J Ostapenko	2	6^{5}
12	D Shnaider	6	6
(Austria) A Potapova	1	3
(United States) M Kessler	4	3
5	(United States) M Keys	6	6

Third round
1	A Sabalenka	6	6
(Romania) S Cîrstea	3	3
12	D Shnaider	7^{7}	6^{5}	6^{4}
5	(United States) M Keys	6^{5}	7^{7}	7^{7}

Quarterfinals
1	A Sabalenka	6	6
5	(United States) M Keys	3	3

==== Section 2 ====
First round
Q	(China) S Zhang	6	5	6
(United States) A Krueger	4	7	4
(Romania) J Cristian	4	3
(Czech Republic) M Bouzková	6	6
(France) E Jacquemot	1	3
WC	(Australia) A Tomljanović	6	6
(United States) S Kenin	6	4	6
Q	(Romania) E-G Ruse	4	6	3

Second round
3	(Kazakhstan) E Rybakina	6	7
Q	(China) S Zhang	3	5
(Czech Republic) M Bouzková	7^{7}	4	2
15	(Spain) P Badosa	6^{4}	6	6
11	(Czech Republic) K Muchová	4	6	7^{7}
WC	(Australia) A Tomljanović	6	1	6^{5}
(United States) S Kenin	6^{2}	3
7	E Alexandrova	7^{7}	6

Third round
3	(Kazakhstan) E Rybakina	6	6
15	(Spain) P Badosa	3	2
11	(Czech Republic) K Muchová	6	7
7	E Alexandrova	4	5

Quarterfinals
3	(Kazakhstan) E Rybakina	2	6	4
11	(Czech Republic) K Muchová	6	2	6

=== Bottom half ===
==== Section 3 ====
First round
Q	A Sasnovich	7	6
A Blinkova	5	1
(Germany) T Maria	3	3
WC	(Australia) E Jones	6	6
(Ukraine) D Yastremska	7^{7}	7^{7}
WC	(Australia) T Gibson	6^{3}	6^{4}
(Czech Republic) T Valentová	4	4
A Kalinskaya	6	6

Second round
8	(Denmark) C Tauson	2	3
Q	A Sasnovich	6	6
WC	(Australia) E Jones	4	1
10	L Samsonova	6	6
13	(Canada) L Fernandez	1	2
(Ukraine) D Yastremska	6	6
A Kalinskaya	2	6	4
4	(United States) J Pegula	6	2	6

Third round
Q	A Sasnovich	4	4
10	L Samsonova	6	6
(Ukraine) D Yastremska	7	2	3
4	(United States) J Pegula	5	6	6

Quarterfinals
10	L Samsonova	3	6^{3}
4	(United States) J Pegula	6	7^{7}

==== Section 4 ====
First round
Q	(Australia) O Gadecki	6	6
(United States) A Li	4	4
(Czech Republic) M Vondroušová	5	7^{7}	6^{0}
(Poland) M Fręch	7	6^{3}	7^{7}
LL	(Kazakhstan) Y Putintseva	6	6
(United States) H Baptiste	2	4
WC	(Australia) K Birrell	6	3	6
Q	(Slovakia) R Šramková	4	6	3

Second round
6	M Andreeva	4	6	6
Q	(Australia) O Gadecki	6	1	2
(Poland) M Fręch	7^{7}	4	4
9	(Czech Republic) L Nosková	6^{5}	6	6
16	(Ukraine) M Kostyuk	6^{5}	6	6
LL	(Kazakhstan) Y Putintseva	7^{7}	1	0
WC	(Australia) K Birrell	1	3
2	(United States) A Anisimova	6	6

Third round
6	M Andreeva	5	6	7
9	(Czech Republic) L Nosková	7	4	5
16	(Ukraine) M Kostyuk	6	6
2	(United States) A Anisimova	4	3

Quarterfinals
6	M Andreeva	6^{7}	3
16	(Ukraine) M Kostyuk	7^{9}	6

== Qualifying ==
=== Seeds ===
1. (Croatia) Antonia Ružić (first round)
2. (Kazakhstan) Yulia Putintseva (qualifying competition, lucky loser)
3. (Slovakia) Rebecca Šramková (qualified)
4. (Hungary) Anna Bondár (qualified)
5. (China) Zhang Shuai (qualified)
6. (Romania) Elena-Gabriela Ruse (qualified)
7. (United States) Katie Volynets (qualifying competition)
8. (Uzbekistan) Kamilla Rakhimova (qualifying competition)
9. Oksana Selekhmeteva (first round)
10. Anastasia Zakharova (first round)
11. (Turkey) Zeynep Sönmez (qualifying competition)
12. Aliaksandra Sasnovich (qualified)

=== Qualifiers ===
1. Aliaksandra Sasnovich
2. (Australia) Olivia Gadecki
3. (Slovakia) Rebecca Šramková
4. (Hungary) Anna Bondár
5. (China) Zhang Shuai
6. (Romania) Elena-Gabriela Ruse

=== Lucky loser ===
1. (Kazakhstan) Yulia Putintseva

=== Draw ===
==== First qualifier ====
First round
1	(Croatia) Antonia Ružić	5	4
(Uzbekistan) Maria Timofeeva	7	6
(Bulgaria) Viktoriya Tomova	2	2
12	Aliaksandra Sasnovich	6	6

Qualifying competition
(Uzbekistan) Maria Timofeeva	2	6	2
12	Aliaksandra Sasnovich	6	3	6

==== Second qualifier ====
First round
2	(Kazakhstan) Yulia Putintseva	6	6
(Australia) Priscilla Hon	4	3
WC	(Australia) Olivia Gadecki	6	7
10	Anastasia Zakharova	3	5

Qualifying competition
2	(Kazakhstan) Yulia Putintseva	6	5	1
WC	(Australia) Olivia Gadecki	1	7	6

==== Third qualifier ====
First round
3	(Slovakia) Rebecca Šramková	6	6
WC	(Australia) Lizette Cabrera	4	2
(Australia) Astra Sharma	2	2
8	(Uzbekistan) Kamilla Rakhimova	6	6

Qualifying competition
3	(Slovakia) Rebecca Šramková	6	6
8	(Uzbekistan) Kamilla Rakhimova	1	2

==== Fourth qualifier ====
First round
4	(Hungary) Anna Bondár	6	7^{7}
(Ukraine) Anhelina Kalinina	4	6^{3}
(Switzerland) Rebeka Masarova	4	4
7	(United States) Katie Volynets	6	6

Qualifying competition
4	(Hungary) Anna Bondár	6	2	6
7	(United States) Katie Volynets	1	6	1

==== Fifth qualifier ====
First round
5	(China) Zhang Shuai	6	3	6
Alt	(France) Fiona Ferro	2	6	4
WC	(Australia) Taylah Preston	7^{7}	6
9	Oksana Selekhmeteva	6^{5}	3

Qualifying competition
5	(China) Zhang Shuai	6	4	6
WC	(Australia) Taylah Preston	1	6	3

==== Sixth qualifier ====
First round
6	(Romania) Elena-Gabriela Ruse	6	6
WC	(Australia) Alana Subasic	1	0
(Andorra) Victoria Jiménez Kasintseva	1	6	6^{3}
11	(Turkey) Zeynep Sönmez	6	3	7^{7}

Qualifying competition
6	(Romania) Elena-Gabriela Ruse	3	6	6
11	(Turkey) Zeynep Sönmez	6	4	0
