= 2026 BNP Paribas Open – Women's singles =

Tennis tournament event

Women's singles
- 2026 BNP Paribas Open

Final
- Champion: Aryna Sabalenka
- Runner-up: (Kazakhstan) Elena Rybakina
- Score: 3–6, 6–3, 7–6^{(8–6)}

Details
- Draw: 96 (12 Q / 8 WC )
- Seeds: 32

Events
Singles	men	women
Doubles	men	women	mixed
- Indian Wells Open

Aryna Sabalenka defeated Elena Rybakina in the final, 3–6, 6–3, 7–6^{(8–6)} to win the women's singles tennis title at the 2026 Indian Wells Open. She saved a championship point en route to her first Indian Wells singles title (having lost two previous finals) and her tenth WTA 1000 singles title overall. The final was a rematch of both the 2023 final and this year's Australian Open final, both won by Rybakina.

Mirra Andreeva was the defending champion, but lost in the third round to Kateřina Siniaková.

Talia Gibson was the youngest woman to reach a WTA 1000 quarterfinal on main-draw debut since Rybakina at the 2019 Wuhan Open, as well as the first qualifier to reach the quarterfinals of Indian Wells since Lesia Tsurenko in 2015.

== Seeds ==
All seeds received a bye into the second round.

1. Aryna Sabalenka (champion)
2. (Poland) Iga Świątek (quarterfinals)
3. (Kazakhstan) Elena Rybakina (final)
4. (United States) Coco Gauff (third round, retired)
5. (United States) Jessica Pegula (quarterfinals)
6. (United States) Amanda Anisimova (fourth round)
7. (Italy) Jasmine Paolini (fourth round)
8. Mirra Andreeva (third round)
9. (Ukraine) Elina Svitolina (semifinals)
10. (Canada) Victoria Mboko (quarterfinals)
11. Ekaterina Alexandrova (second round)
12. (Switzerland) Belinda Bencic (fourth round)
13. (Czech Republic) Karolína Muchová (fourth round)
14. (Czech Republic) Linda Nosková (semifinals)
15. (United States) Madison Keys (third round)
16. (Japan) Naomi Osaka (fourth round)
17. (Denmark) Clara Tauson (third round)
18. (United States) Iva Jovic (second round)
19. Liudmila Samsonova (second round)
20. (United States) Emma Navarro (second round)
21. Diana Shnaider (second round)
22. (Belgium) Elise Mertens (third round)
23. Anna Kalinskaya (third round)
24. (China) Zheng Qinwen (second round)
25. (United Kingdom) Emma Raducanu (third round)
26. (Latvia) Jeļena Ostapenko (third round)
27. (Canada) Leylah Fernandez (second round)
28. (Ukraine) Marta Kostyuk (third round)
29. (Australia) Maya Joint (second round)
30. (China) Wang Xinyu (second round)
31. (Philippines) Alexandra Eala (fourth round)
32. (Greece) Maria Sakkari (third round)

Click on the seed number of a player to go to their draw section.

== Draw ==
Key

- Q = Qualifier
- WC = Wild card
- LL = Lucky loser
- Alt = Alternate
- ITF = ITF entry
- PR = Protected ranking
- SR = Special ranking
- SE = Special exempt
- JE = Junior exempt
- JR = Junior Accelerator Programme entrant
- CO = College Accelerator Programme entrant
- NG = Next Gen Accelerator Program entrant
- w/o = Walkover
- r = Retired
- d = Defaulted

=== Finals ===
Quarterfinals
1	Aryna Sabalenka	7^{7}	6
10	(Canada) Victoria Mboko	6^{0}	4
14	(Czech Republic) Linda Nosková	6	4	6
Q	(Australia) Talia Gibson	2	6	2
5	(United States) Jessica Pegula	1	6^{4}
3	(Kazakhstan) Elena Rybakina	6	7^{7}
9	(Ukraine) Elina Svitolina	6	4	6
2	(Poland) Iga Świątek	2	6	4

Semifinals
1	Aryna Sabalenka	6	6
14	(Czech Republic) Linda Nosková	3	4
3	(Kazakhstan) Elena Rybakina	7	6
9	(Ukraine) Elina Svitolina	5	4

Final
1	Aryna Sabalenka	3	6	7^{8}
3	(Kazakhstan) Elena Rybakina	6	3	6^{6}

=== Top half ===
==== Section 1 ====
First round
Q	(Japan) H Sakatsume	6	6
WC	(United States) A Parks	4	3
(Romania) J Cristian	4	6	7^{8}
(Indonesia) J Tjen	6	4	6^{6}
WC	(United States) S Stephens	4	1
(Colombia) C Osorio	6	6
Q	(Andorra) V Jiménez Kasintseva	6	6^{4}	6
(United States) C McNally	2	7^{7}	4

Second round
1	A Sabalenka	6	6
Q	(Japan) H Sakatsume	4	2
(Romania) J Cristian	0	6	7
29	(Australia) M Joint	6	2	5
18	(United States) I Jovic	6	6^{4}	3
(Colombia) C Osorio	4	7^{7}	6
Q	(Andorra) V Jiménez Kasintseva	5	2
16	(Japan) N Osaka	7	6

Third round
1	A Sabalenka	6	6
(Romania) J Cristian	4	1
(Colombia) C Osorio	1	6	1
16	(Japan) N Osaka	6	3	6

Fourth round
1	A Sabalenka	6	6
16	(Japan) N Osaka	2	4

==== Section 2 ====
First round
(Australia) K Birrell	6	6
O Selekhmeteva	1	4
(Turkey) Z Sönmez	7^{9}	6
(United States) M Kessler	6^{7}	0
(Germany) E Seidel	2	2
Q	A Zakharova	6	6
LL	(Hungary) D Gálfi	4	5
A Blinkova	6	7

Second round
10	(Canada) V Mboko	6	7^{7}
(Australia) K Birrell	4	6^{5}
(Turkey) Z Sönmez	4	6^{4}
23	A Kalinskaya	6	7^{7}
25	(United Kingdom) E Raducanu	6	6
Q	A Zakharova	1	3
A Blinkova	7	1	0
6	(United States) A Anisimova	5	6	6

Third round
10	(Canada) V Mboko	6	6
23	A Kalinskaya	4	1
25	(United Kingdom) E Raducanu	1	1
6	(United States) A Anisimova	6	6

Fourth round
10	(Canada) V Mboko	6	6
6	(United States) A Anisimova	4	1

==== Section 3 ====
First round
WC	(Canada) B Andreescu	7^{8}	0	1
Q	(Uzbekistan) K Rakhimova	6^{6}	6	6
(Ukraine) D Yastremska	6	6
(China) S Zhang	3	2
(Romania) S Cîrstea	6	4	6
(Germany) T Maria	4	6	3
(Spain) J Bouzas Maneiro	6	6^{5}	6
(Brazil) B Haddad Maia	1	7^{7}	1

Second round
4	(United States) C Gauff	6	7^{7}
Q	(Uzbekistan) K Rakhimova	3	6^{5}
(Ukraine) D Yastremska	5	6	5
31	(Philippines) A Eala	7	4	7
21	D Shnaider	2	6^{0}
(Romania) S Cîrstea	6	7^{7}
(Spain) J Bouzas Maneiro	3	3
14	(Czech Republic) L Nosková	6	6

Third round
4	(United States) C Gauff	2	0^{r}
31	(Philippines) A Eala	6	2
(Romania) S Cîrstea	7^{7}	4	4
14	(Czech Republic) L Nosková	6^{5}	6	6

Fourth round
31	(Philippines) A Eala	2	0
14	(Czech Republic) L Nosková	6	6

==== Section 4 ====
First round
Q	(Australia) T Gibson	6	7
(United States) A Li	3	5
(Kazakhstan) Y Putintseva	6	6
(Spain) P Badosa	4	2
(Australia) A Tomljanović	7	6
(Romania) E-G Ruse	5	2
(Austria) A Potapova	4	6	7
Q	(Canada) M Stakusic	6	1	5

Second round
11	E Alexandrova	3	5
Q	(Australia) T Gibson	6	7
(Kazakhstan) Y Putintseva	6^{9}	2
17	(Denmark) C Tauson	7^{11}	6
30	(China) Xin Wang	3	1
(Australia) A Tomljanović	6	6
(Austria) A Potapova	7^{7}	2	3
7	(Italy) J Paolini	6^{5}	6	6

Third round
Q	(Australia) T Gibson	7^{7}	4	6
17	(Denmark) C Tauson	6^{2}	6	4
(Australia) A Tomljanović	5	7	1
7	(Italy) J Paolini	7	5	6

Fourth round
Q	(Australia) T Gibson	7	2	6
7	(Italy) J Paolini	5	6	1

=== Bottom half ===
==== Section 5 ====
First round
WC	(Croatia) D Vekić	7^{7}	7^{7}
(Czech Republic) T Valentová	6^{4}	6^{4}
WC	(United States) K Volynets	6	0
(Slovakia) R Šramková	1	0^{r}
(Spain) C Bucșa	6	6
Q	(Czech Republic) D Vidmanova	4	0
Q	(Australia) S Hunter	3	7	6
(Poland) M Fręch	6	5	3

Second round
5	(United States) J Pegula	4	6	6
WC	(Croatia) D Vekić	6	2	3
WC	(United States) K Volynets	4	6^{5}
26	(Latvia) J Ostapenko	6	7^{7}
22	(Belgium) E Mertens	6	6
(Spain) C Bucșa	2	1
Q	(Australia) S Hunter	3	2
12	(Switzerland) B Bencic	6	6

Third round
5	(United States) J Pegula	4	6	6
26	(Latvia) J Ostapenko	6	3	2
22	(Belgium) E Mertens	2	3
12	(Switzerland) B Bencic	6	6

Fourth round
5	(United States) J Pegula	6	7^{7}
12	(Switzerland) B Bencic	3	6^{5}

==== Section 6 ====
First round
Q	(France) D Parry	6	6^{4}	6
WC	(United States) V Williams	3	7^{7}	1
Q	(Thailand) L Tararudee	4	4
(United Kingdom) S Kartal	6	6
(Czech Republic) M Bouzková	2	1
Q	(United States) T Townsend	6	6
(Colombia) E Arango	6	2	3
(United States) H Baptiste	2	6	6

Second round
15	(United States) M Keys	6	6
Q	(France) D Parry	4	3
(United Kingdom) S Kartal	6	3	7^{7}
20	(United States) E Navarro	1	6	6^{2}
28	(Ukraine) M Kostyuk	6	6
Q	(United States) T Townsend	3	2
(United States) H Baptiste	6^{5}	6	2
3	(Kazakhstan) E Rybakina	7^{7}	2	6

Third round
15	(United States) M Keys	6	2	3
(United Kingdom) S Kartal	2	6	6
28	(Ukraine) M Kostyuk	4	4
3	(Kazakhstan) E Rybakina	6	6

Fourth round
(United Kingdom) S Kartal	4	3^{r}
3	(Kazakhstan) E Rybakina	6	4

==== Section 7 ====
First round
(United States) P Stearns	5	5
(Argentina) S Sierra	7	7
(Czech Republic) K Siniaková	1	6	6
(United States) S Kenin	6	4	1
(Poland) M Linette	1	4
(United States) A Krueger	6	6
(Germany) L Siegemund	3	6	6
(Croatia) P Marčinko	6	3	4

Second round
8	M Andreeva	6	6
(Argentina) S Sierra	0	0
(Czech Republic) K Siniaková	5	6	7^{7}
27	(Canada) L Fernandez	7	4	6^{1}
19	L Samsonova	6	5	2
(United States) A Krueger	3	7	6
(Germany) L Siegemund	6^{5}	6	3
9	(Ukraine) E Svitolina	7^{7}	4	6

Third round
8	M Andreeva	6	6^{5}	3
(Czech Republic) K Siniaková	4	7^{7}	6
(United States) A Krueger	4	2
9	(Ukraine) E Svitolina	6	6

Fourth round
(Czech Republic) K Siniaková	1	1^{r}
9	(Ukraine) E Svitolina	6	1

==== Section 8 ====
First round
(France) E Jacquemot	6^{5}	5
(Hungary) A Bondár	7^{7}	7
(Croatia) A Ružić	3	6	6
WC	(United States) J Brady	6	4	2
(France) V Gracheva	2	4
WC	(Austria) L Tagger	6	6
(United Kingdom) F Jones	3	1
Q	(United States) K Day	6	6

Second round
13	(Czech Republic) K Muchová	7	6
(Hungary) A Bondár	5	2
(Croatia) A Ružić	6	7
24	(China) Q Zheng	4	5
32	(Greece) M Sakkari	7	6
WC	(Austria) L Tagger	5	0
Q	(United States) K Day	0	6^{2}
2	(Poland) I Świątek	6	7^{7}

Third round
13	(Czech Republic) K Muchová	6	6
(Croatia) A Ružić	0	3
32	(Greece) M Sakkari	3	2
2	(Poland) I Świątek	6	6

Fourth round
13	(Czech Republic) K Muchová	2	0
2	(Poland) I Świątek	6	6

== Seeded players ==
The following are the seeded players. Seedings are based on WTA rankings as of February 23, 2026. Rankings and points before are as of March 2, 2026.

^{‡}	Champion
^{†}	Runner-up

Seed	Rank	Player	Points before	Points defending	Points won	Points after	Status
1	1	Aryna Sabalenka^{‡}	10,675	650	1,000	11,025	Champion, defeated (Kazakhstan) Elena Rybakina [3]
2	2	(Poland) Iga Świątek	7,588	390	215	7,413	Quarterfinals lost to (Ukraine) Elina Svitolina [9]
3	3	(Kazakhstan) Elena Rybakina^{†}	7,253	120	650	7,783	Runner-up, lost to Aryna Sabalenka [1]
4	4	(United States) Coco Gauff	6,803	120	65	6,748	Third round retired against (Philippines) Alexandra Eala [31]
5	5	(United States) Jessica Pegula	6,583	120	215	6,678	Quarterfinals lost to (Kazakhstan) Elena Rybakina [3]
6	6	(United States) Amanda Anisimova	6,070	10	120	6,180	Fourth round lost to (Canada) Victoria Mboko [10]
7	7	(Italy) Jasmine Paolini	4,232	120	120	4,232	Fourth round lost to (Australia) Talia Gibson [Q]
8	8	Mirra Andreeva	4,001	1,000	65	3,066	Third round lost to (Czech Republic) Kateřina Siniaková
9	9	(Ukraine) Elina Svitolina	3,845	215	390	4,020	Semifinals lost to (Kazakhstan) Elena Rybakina [3]
10	10	(Canada) Victoria Mboko	3,211	(75)^{Ω}	215	3,351	Quarterfinals lost to Aryna Sabalenka [1]
11	11	Ekaterina Alexandrova	2,918	10	10	2,918	Second round lost to (Australia) Talia Gibson [Q]
12	12	(Switzerland) Belinda Bencic	2,898	215	120	2,803	Fourth round lost to (United States) Jessica Pegula [5]
13	13	(Czech Republic) Karolína Muchová	2,668	120	120	2,668	Fourth round lost to (Poland) Iga Świątek [2]
14	14	(Czech Republic) Linda Nosková	2,421	10	390	2,801	Semifinals lost to Aryna Sabalenka [1]
15	15	(United States) Madison Keys	2,351	390	65	2,026	Third round lost to (United Kingdom) Sonay Kartal
16	16	(Japan) Naomi Osaka	2,324	10	120	2,434	Fourth round lost to Aryna Sabalenka [1]
17	17	(Denmark) Clara Tauson	2,095	65	65	2,095	Third round lost to (Australia) Talia Gibson [Q]
18	18	(United States) Iva Jovic	2,095	35	10	2,070	Second round lost to (Colombia) Camila Osorio
19	19	Liudmila Samsonova	2,050	215	10	1,845	Second round lost to (United States) Ashlyn Krueger
20	25	(United States) Emma Navarro	1,605	65	10	1,550	Second round lost to (United Kingdom) Sonay Kartal
21	20	Diana Shnaider	1,953	65	10	1,898	Second round lost to (Romania) Sorana Cirstea
22	21	(Belgium) Elise Mertens	1,936	65	65	1,936	Third round lost to (Switzerland) Belinda Bencic [12]
23	22	Anna Kalinskaya	1,813	10	65	1,868	Third round lost to (Canada) Victoria Mboko [10]
24	23	(China) Zheng Qinwen	1,758	215	10	1,553	Second round lost to (Croatia) Antonia Ružić
25	24	(United Kingdom) Emma Raducanu	1,645	(30)^{∆}	65	1,680	Third round lost to (United States) Amanda Anisimova [6]
26	26	(Latvia) Jeļena Ostapenko	1,600	10	65	1,655	Third round lost to (United States) Jessica Pegula [5]
27	27	(Canada) Leylah Fernandez	1,598	10	10	1,598	Second round lost to (Czech Republic) Kateřina Siniaková
28	28	(Ukraine) Marta Kostyuk	1,583	120	65	1,528	Third round lost to (Kazakhstan) Elena Rybakina [3]
29	29	(Australia) Maya Joint	1,465	30	10	1,445	Second round lost to (Romania) Jaqueline Cristian
30	30	(China) Wang Xinyu	1,438	65	10	1,383	Second round lost to (Australia) Ajla Tomljanović
31	32	(Philippines) Alexandra Eala	1,432	(27)^{∆}	120	1,525	Fourth round lost to (Czech Republic) Linda Nosková [14]
32	34	(Greece) Maria Sakkari	1,410	65	65	1,410	Third round lost to (Poland) Iga Świątek [2]

∆ The player is defending points from her 18th best result.
Ω The player is defending points from an ITF tournament.

== Other entry information ==
=== Wildcards ===
- (Canada) Bianca Andreescu
- (United States) Jennifer Brady
- (United States) Alycia Parks
- (United States) Sloane Stephens
- (Austria) Lilli Tagger
- (Croatia) Donna Vekić
- (United States) Katie Volynets
- (United States) Venus Williams

=== Withdrawals ===
- ‡ (France) Loïs Boisson → replaced by Oksana Selekhmeteva
- ‡ (Italy) Elisabetta Cocciaretto → replaced by (Colombia) Camila Osorio
- ‡ (Australia) Daria Kasatkina → replaced by (Slovakia) Rebecca Šramková
- ‡ (Czech Republic) Barbora Krejčiková → replaced by (China) Zhang Shuai
- ‡ Veronika Kudermetova → replaced by (Turkey) Zeynep Sönmez
- † (Germany) Eva Lys → replaced by (Hungary) Dalma Gálfi (LL)
- ‡ (Czech Republic) Markéta Vondroušová → replaced by (Australia) Kimberly Birrell
- ‡ (China) Wang Yafan → replaced by (Germany) Ella Seidel

‡ – withdrew from entry list
† – withdrew from main draw

== Qualifying ==
=== Seeds ===
1. (United Kingdom) Katie Boulter (qualifying competition)
2. (Switzerland) Viktorija Golubic (first round)
3. (Switzerland) Simona Waltert (first round)
4. (Hungary) Dalma Gálfi (qualifying competition, lucky loser)
5. Anastasia Zakharova (qualified)
6. (Mexico) Renata Zarazúa (first round)
7. (Uzbekistan) Kamilla Rakhimova (qualified)
8. (Slovenia) Kaja Juvan (withdrew)
9. (Latvia) Darja Semeņistaja (qualifying competition)
10. (New Zealand) Lulu Sun (qualifying competition)
11. (Austria) Sinja Kraus (first round)
12. (Ukraine) Yuliia Starodubtseva (first round)
13. (Netherlands) Suzan Lamens (first round)
14. (Czech Republic) Nikola Bartůňková (qualifying competition)
15. (France) Diane Parry (qualified)
16. (Australia) Talia Gibson (qualified)
17. Aliaksandra Sasnovich (first round)
18. (France) Léolia Jeanjean (qualifying competition)
19. (Czech Republic) Darja Vidmanova (qualified)
20. (United States) Taylor Townsend (qualified)
21. (Switzerland) Rebeka Masarova (first round)
22. (Czech Republic) Linda Fruhvirtová (qualifying competition)
23. (Andorra) Victoria Jiménez Kasintseva (qualified)
24. (Thailand) Lanlana Tararudee (qualified)

=== Qualifiers ===
1. (Andorra) Victoria Jiménez Kasintseva
2. (Canada) Marina Stakusic
3. (Japan) Himeno Sakatsume
4. (Thailand) Lanlana Tararudee
5. Anastasia Zakharova
6. (Czech Republic) Darja Vidmanova
7. (Uzbekistan) Kamilla Rakhimova
8. (United States) Taylor Townsend
9. (United States) Kayla Day
10. (France) Diane Parry
11. (Australia) Storm Hunter
12. (Australia) Talia Gibson

=== Lucky loser ===
1. (Hungary) Dalma Gálfi

=== Qualifying draw ===
==== First qualifier ====
First round
1	(United Kingdom) Katie Boulter	6	6
(Bulgaria) Viktoriya Tomova	4	3
(Italy) Lucrezia Stefanini	6	4	4
23	(Andorra) Victoria Jiménez Kasintseva	4	6	6

Qualifying competition
1	(United Kingdom) Katie Boulter	6	5	2
23	(Andorra) Victoria Jiménez Kasintseva	2	7	6

==== Second qualifier ====
First round
2	(Switzerland) Viktorija Golubic	6^{8}	2
(Canada) Marina Stakusic	7^{10}	6
PR	(Thailand) Mananchaya Sawangkaew	6	7
21	(Switzerland) Rebeka Masarova	3	5

Qualifying competition
(Canada) Marina Stakusic	6	6
PR	(Thailand) Mananchaya Sawangkaew	1	2

==== Third qualifier ====
First round
3	(Switzerland) Simona Waltert	4	4
(Japan) Himeno Sakatsume	6	6
WC	(Australia) Emerson Jones	2	2
14	(Czech Republic) Nikola Bartůňková	6	6

Qualifying competition
(Japan) Himeno Sakatsume	7	1	6
14	(Czech Republic) Nikola Bartůňková	5	6	3

==== Fourth qualifier ====
First round
4	(Hungary) Dalma Gálfi	6	6
(China) Yuan Yue	2	4
WC	(United States) Julieta Pareja	4	3
24	(Thailand) Lanlana Tararudee	6	6

Qualifying competition
4	(Hungary) Dalma Gálfi	3	4
24	(Thailand) Lanlana Tararudee	6	6

==== Fifth qualifier ====
First round
5	Anastasia Zakharova	7	6
(United States) Caroline Dolehide	5	1
(United States) Varvara Lepchenko	3	3
22	(Czech Republic) Linda Fruhvirtová	6	6

Qualifying competition
5	Anastasia Zakharova	6	7^{7}
22	(Czech Republic) Linda Fruhvirtová	4	6^{2}

==== Sixth qualifier ====
First round
6	(Mexico) Renata Zarazúa	5	6^{3}
(Australia) Priscilla Hon	7	7^{7}
PR	(Italy) Martina Trevisan	3	2
19	(Czech Republic) Darja Vidmanova	6	6

Qualifying competition
(Australia) Priscilla Hon	5	6^{4}
19	(Czech Republic) Darja Vidmanova	7	7^{7}

==== Seventh qualifier ====
First round
7	(Uzbekistan) Kamilla Rakhimova	6	6
(Argentina) María Lourdes Carlé	2	2
(Uzbekistan) Maria Timofeeva	6	6
13	(Netherlands) Suzan Lamens	2	2

Qualifying competition
7	(Uzbekistan) Kamilla Rakhimova	4	5
(Uzbekistan) Maria Timofeeva	6	4^{r}

==== Eighth qualifier ====
First round
Alt	(United States) Louisa Chirico	3	6	3
WC	(United States) Akasha Urhobo	6	2	6
(Chinese Taipei) Joanna Garland	4	4
20	(United States) Taylor Townsend	6	6

Qualifying competition
WC	(United States) Akasha Urhobo	0	6^{5}
20	(United States) Taylor Townsend	6	7^{7}

==== Ninth qualifier ====
First round
9	(Latvia) Darja Semeņistaja	2	6	6
(United States) Whitney Osuigwe	6	1	3
WC	(United States) Kayla Day	6	7
17	Aliaksandra Sasnovich	2	5

Qualifying competition
9	(Latvia) Darja Semeņistaja	2	1
WC	(United States) Kayla Day	6	6

==== Tenth qualifier ====
First round
10	(New Zealand) Lulu Sun	7	6
(Australia) Maddison Inglis	5	3
WC	(United States) Elizabeth Mandlik	2	3
15	(France) Diane Parry	6	6

Qualifying competition
10	(New Zealand) Lulu Sun	2	3
15	(France) Diane Parry	6	6

==== Eleventh qualifier ====
First round
11	(Austria) Sinja Kraus	6^{4}	4
PR	(Australia) Storm Hunter	7^{7}	6
WC	(United States) Mary Stoiana	4	4
18	(France) Léolia Jeanjean	6	6

Qualifying competition
PR	(Australia) Storm Hunter	6	6
18	(France) Léolia Jeanjean	2	2

==== Twelfth qualifier ====
First round
12	(Ukraine) Yuliia Starodubtseva	3	1
(United States) Elvina Kalieva	6	6
PR	(United States) Madison Brengle	0	6^{6}
16	(Australia) Talia Gibson	6	7^{8}

Qualifying competition
(United States) Elvina Kalieva	6	5	3
16	(Australia) Talia Gibson	4	7	6
