= 2026 BNP Paribas Open =

- Date: March 4–15
- Edition: 52nd (ATP) / 37th (WTA)
- Category: ATP Tour Masters 1000 (Men); WTA 1000 (Women)
- Draw: 96S / 32D / 16X
- Prize money: $9,415,725 (per Tour)
- Surface: Hard
- Location: Indian Wells, California, United States
- Venue: Indian Wells Tennis Garden

Champions

Men's singles
- (Italy) Jannik Sinner

Women's singles
- Aryna Sabalenka

Men's doubles
- (Argentina) Guido Andreozzi / (France) Manuel Guinard

Women's doubles
- (Czech Republic) Kateřina Siniaková / (United States) Taylor Townsend

Mixed doubles
- (Switzerland) Belinda Bencic / (Italy) Flavio Cobolli
- Indian Wells Open

The 2026 Indian Wells Open (called the BNP Paribas Open for sponsorship reasons) was a professional men's and women's tennis tournament played in Indian Wells, California. It was the 52nd edition of the men's event and 37th of the women's event and was classified as an ATP Tour Masters 1000 event on the 2026 ATP Tour and a WTA 1000 event on the 2026 WTA Tour. The men's and women's main draw events took place from March 4 to March 15, 2026 on outdoor hardcourts at the Indian Wells Tennis Garden. The tournament also featured a mixed doubles invitational event from March 10 through 14, 2026.

== Champions ==
=== Men's singles ===
- (Italy) Jannik Sinner def. Daniil Medvedev, 7–6^{(8–6)}, 7–6^{(7–4)}
  - This was Sinner's first title of the season and sixth career Masters 1000, with which he completed his list of Big Titles on hardcourts.

=== Women's singles ===
- Aryna Sabalenka def. (Kazakhstan) Elena Rybakina, 3–6, 6–3, 7–6^{(8–6)}

=== Men's doubles ===
- (Argentina) Guido Andreozzi / (France) Manuel Guinard def. (France) Arthur Rinderknech / (Monaco) Valentin Vacherot, 7–6^{(7–3)}, 6–3

=== Women's doubles ===
- (Czech Republic) Kateřina Siniaková / (United States) Taylor Townsend def. (Kazakhstan) Anna Danilina / (Serbia) Aleksandra Krunić, 7–6^{(7–4)}, 6–4

=== Mixed doubles ===
- (Switzerland) Belinda Bencic / (Italy) Flavio Cobolli def. (Canada) Gabriela Dabrowski / (United Kingdom) Lloyd Glasspool, 6–3, 2–6, [10–7]

== Points and prize money ==
=== Point distribution ===
Event	W	F	SF	QF	R16	R32	R64	R128	Q	Q2	Q1
Men's singles	1000	650	400	200	100	50	30*	10**	20	10	0
Men's doubles	1000	600	360	180	90	0	—N/a	—N/a	—N/a	—N/a	—N/a
Women's singles	1000	650	390	215	120	65	35*	10	30	20	2
Women's doubles	1000	650	390	215	120	10	—N/a	—N/a	—N/a	—N/a	—N/a

* Players with byes receive first-round points.
** Singles players with wild cards earn 0 points.

=== Prize money ===
Event	W	F	SF	QF	R16	R32	R64	R128	Q2	Q1
Men's singles	$1,151,380	$612,340	$340,190	$193,645	$105,720	$61,865	$36,110	$24,335	$14,130	$7,330
Women's singles	$1,151,380	$612,340	$340,190	$193,645	$105,720	$61,865	$36,110	$24,335	$14,130	$7,330
Men's doubles*	$468,200	$247,870	$133,110	$66,570	$35,700	$19,510	—N/a	—N/a	—N/a	—N/a
Women's doubles*	$468,200	$247,870	$133,110	$66,570	$35,700	$19,510	—N/a	—N/a	—N/a	—N/a
Mixed doubles*	$360,000	$160,000	$80,000	$40,000	$20,000	—N/a	—N/a	—N/a	—N/a	—N/a

*per team

== See also ==
- 2026 ATP Tour
- 2026 WTA Tour
- ATP Tour Masters 1000
- WTA 1000 tournaments
