= 2026 Brisbane International =

Tennis tournament

- Date: 4–11 January 2026
- Edition: 15th
- Category: ATP Tour 250; WTA 500
- Draw: 32S / 24D / 24Q (ATP); 48S / 16D / 24Q (WTA)
- Prize money: $800,045 (ATP) $1,691,602 (WTA)
- Surface: Hard
- Location: Tennyson, Brisbane, Queensland, Australia
- Venue: Queensland Tennis Centre

Champions

Men's singles
- Daniil Medvedev

Women's singles
- Aryna Sabalenka

Men's doubles
- (Portugal) Francisco Cabral / (Austria) Lucas Miedler

Women's doubles
- (Chinese Taipei) Hsieh Su-wei / (Latvia) Jeļena Ostapenko
- Brisbane International

The 2026 Brisbane International was a professional tennis tournament on the 2026 ATP Tour and 2026 WTA Tour. It was played on outdoor hard courts in Brisbane, Queensland, Australia, from 4 to 11 January. It was the fifteenth edition of the tournament and took place at the Queensland Tennis Centre in Tennyson, as part of the Australian Open Series, in preparation for the first Grand Slam of the year.

== Champions ==
=== Men's singles ===
- Daniil Medvedev def. (United States) Brandon Nakashima 6–2, 7–6^{(7–1)}

=== Women's singles ===
- Aryna Sabalenka def. (Ukraine) Marta Kostyuk 6–4, 6–3

=== Men's doubles ===
- (Portugal) Francisco Cabral / (Austria) Lucas Miedler def. (United Kingdom) Julian Cash / (United Kingdom) Lloyd Glasspool 6–3, 3–6, [10–8]

=== Women's doubles ===
- (Chinese Taipei) Hsieh Su-wei / (Latvia) Jeļena Ostapenko def. (Spain) Cristina Bucșa / (Australia) Ellen Perez 6–2, 6–1

== ATP singles main-draw entrants ==
=== Seeds ===
Country	Player	Rank^{1}	Seed
	Daniil Medvedev	13	1
ESP	Alejandro Davidovich Fokina	14	2
CZE	Jiří Lehečka	18	3
USA	Tommy Paul	20	4
CAN	Denis Shapovalov	23	5
~~BRA~~	~~João Fonseca~~	~~24~~	~~6~~
GBR	Cameron Norrie	27	7
USA	Learner Tien	28	8

- ^{1} Rankings are as of 29 December 2025.

=== Other entrants ===
The following players received wildcards into the singles main draw:

- (Australia) Nick Kyrgios
- (Australia) Aleksandar Vukic
- (Australia) Adam Walton

The following players received entry from the qualifying draw:

- (Spain) Pablo Carreño Busta
- (Belgium) Raphaël Collignon
- (Australia) James Duckworth
- (France) Quentin Halys
- (Australia) Rinky Hijikata
- (Australia) Dane Sweeny

The following players received entry as a lucky loser:

- ~~(Italy) Matteo Arnaldi~~
- (Poland) Kamil Majchrzak

=== Withdrawals ===
- (Brazil) João Fonseca → replaced by (Poland) Kamil Majchrzak (LL)
- (France) Corentin Moutet → replaced by (France) Giovanni Mpetshi Perricard

== ATP doubles main-draw entrants ==
=== Seeds ===
Country	Player	Country	Player	Rank^{1}	Seed
GBR	Julian Cash	GBR	Lloyd Glasspool	3	1
IND	Yuki Bhambri	SWE	André Göransson	43	2
POR	Francisco Cabral	AUT	Lucas Miedler	44	3
MON	Hugo Nys	NED	Sem Verbeek	54	4
FRA	Manuel Guinard	GBR	Luke Johnson	60	5
FRA	Sadio Doumbia	FRA	Fabien Reboul	62	6
USA	Evan King	AUS	John Peers	66	7
USA	Robert Cash	USA	JJ Tracy	69	8

- ^{1} Rankings are as of 29 December 2025.

=== Other entrants ===
The following pairs received wildcards into the doubles main draw:

- (Australia) James Duckworth / (Australia) Cruz Hewitt
- (Australia) Thanasi Kokkinakis / (Australia) Nick Kyrgios

=== Withdrawals ===
- (Spain) Alejandro Davidovich Fokina / (Czech Republic) Jiří Lehečka → replaced by (United States) Tommy Paul / (United States) Ethan Quinn

== WTA singles main-draw entrants ==
=== Seeds ===
Country	Player	Rank^{1}	Seed
	Aryna Sabalenka	1	1
USA	Amanda Anisimova	4	2
KAZ	Elena Rybakina	5	3
USA	Jessica Pegula	6	4
USA	Madison Keys	7	5
	Mirra Andreeva	9	6
	Ekaterina Alexandrova	10	7
DEN	Clara Tauson	12	8
CZE	Linda Nosková	13	9
	Liudmila Samsonova	17	10
CZE	Karolína Muchová	19	11
	Diana Shnaider	21	12
CAN	Leylah Fernandez	22	13
LAT	Jeļena Ostapenko	23	14
ESP	Paula Badosa	25	15
UKR	Marta Kostyuk	26	16

- ^{1} Rankings are as of 29 December 2025.

=== Other entrants ===
The following players received wildcards into the singles main draw:

- (Australia) Kimberly Birrell
- (Australia) Talia Gibson
- (Australia) Emerson Jones
- (Australia) Ajla Tomljanović

The following player received entry using a protected ranking into the main draw:

- ~~(Czech Republic) Karolína Plíšková~~

The following players received entry from the qualifying draw:

- (Hungary) Anna Bondár
- (Australia) Olivia Gadecki
- (Romania) Elena-Gabriela Ruse
- Aliaksandra Sasnovich
- (Slovakia) Rebecca Šramková
- (China) Zhang Shuai

The following player received entry as a lucky loser:

- (Kazakhstan) Yulia Putintseva

=== Withdrawals ===
- Veronika Kudermetova → replaced by Anna Blinkova
- (Czech Republic) Karolína Plíšková → replaced by (Kazakhstan) Yulia Putintseva (LL)

== WTA doubles main-draw entrants ==
=== Seeds ===
Country	Player	Country	Player	Rank^{1}	Seed
TPE	Hsieh Su-wei	LAT	Jeļena Ostapenko	16	1
KAZ	Anna Danilina	SRB	Aleksandra Krunić	32	2
ESP	Cristina Bucșa	AUS	Ellen Perez	51	3
	Irina Khromacheva		Alexandra Panova	52	4

- ^{1} Rankings are as of 29 December 2025.

=== Other entrants ===
The following pairs received wildcards into the doubles main draw:

- (Australia) Kimberly Birrell / (Australia) Talia Gibson
- (Australia) Priscilla Hon / (Czech Republic) Karolína Muchová
