= 2026 WTA Tour =

Women's tennis circuit

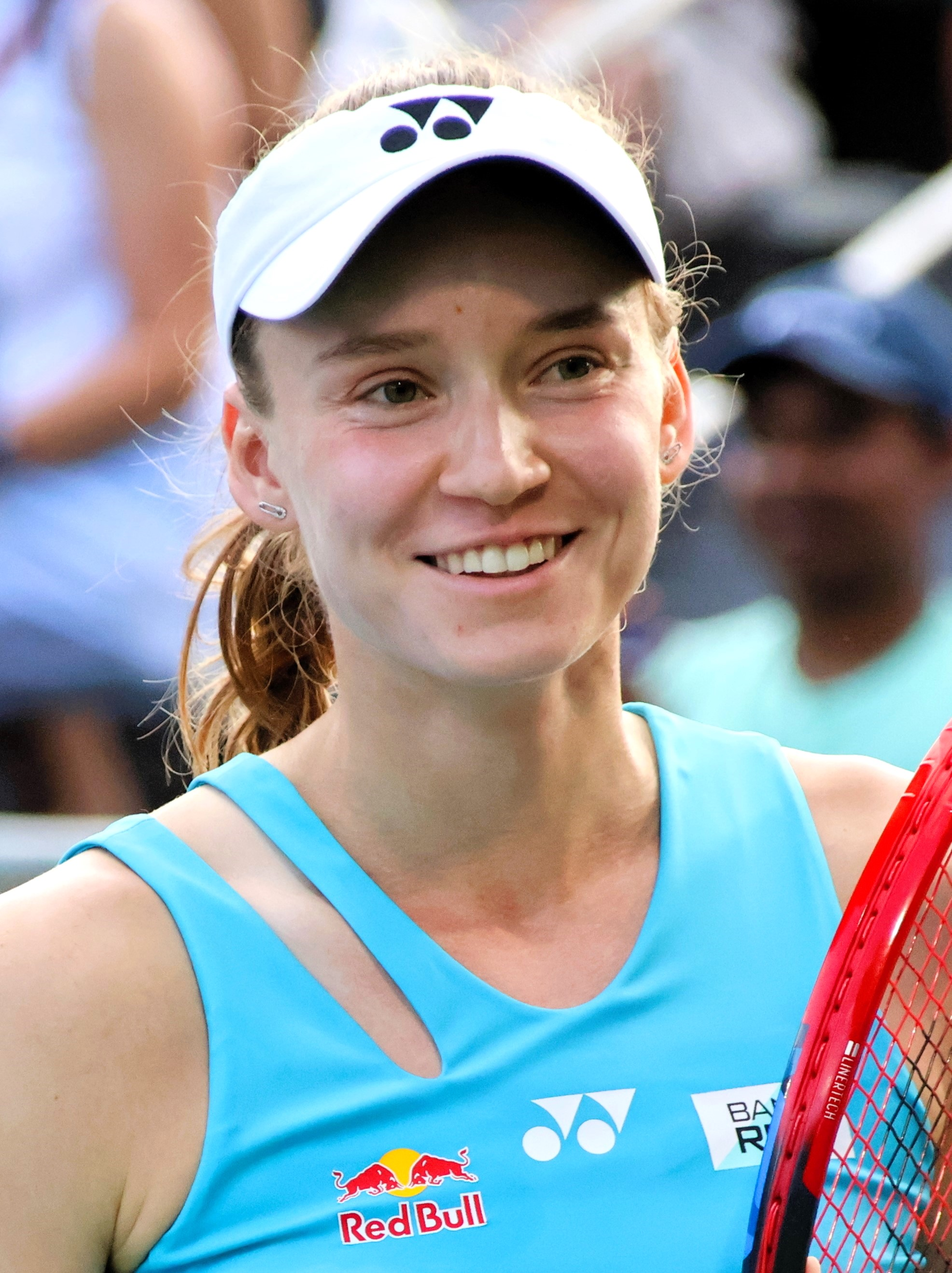
- Elena Rybakina finished the year as world No. 1 for the first time in her career. She won four tournaments during the season, including two majors at the Australian Open and US Open.

Details
- Duration: 2 January – 22 November 2026
- Edition: 56th
- Tournaments: 57
- Categories: Grand Slam (4); WTA Finals; WTA 1000 (10); WTA 500 (17); WTA 250 (22); Billie Jean King Cup; United Cup

Achievements (singles)
- Most titles: Mirra Andreeva (Kazakhstan) Elena Rybakina (4)
- Most finals: Mirra Andreeva (Kazakhstan) Elena Rybakina (6)
- Prize money leader: (Kazakhstan) Elena Rybakina ($11,134,420)
- Points leader: (Kazakhstan) Elena Rybakina (8,099)

The 2026 WTA Tour (branded as the 2026 WTA Tour Driven by Mercedes-Benz for sponsorship reasons) is the global elite women's professional tennis circuit organized by the Women's Tennis Association (WTA) for the 2026 tennis season. The calendar comprises the Grand Slam tournaments (supervised by World Tennis), the WTA 1000 tournaments, the WTA 500 tournaments, the WTA 250 tournaments, the Billie Jean King Cup (organized by World Tennis), the year-end championships (WTA Finals), and the team event United Cup (combined event with ATP).

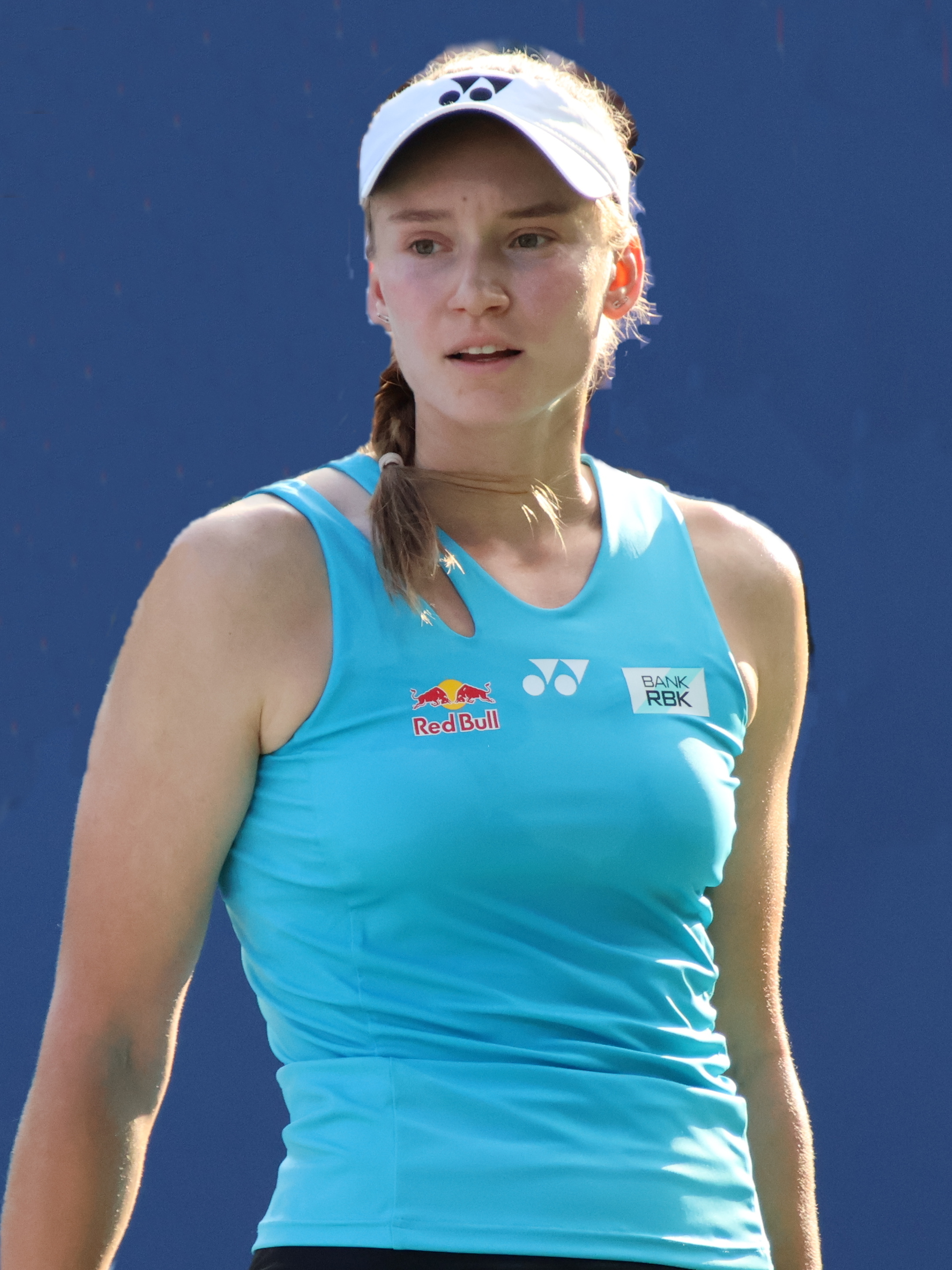
Elena Rybakina won her second and third major titles at the Australian Open and the US Open, defeating Aryna Sabalenka in both finals.

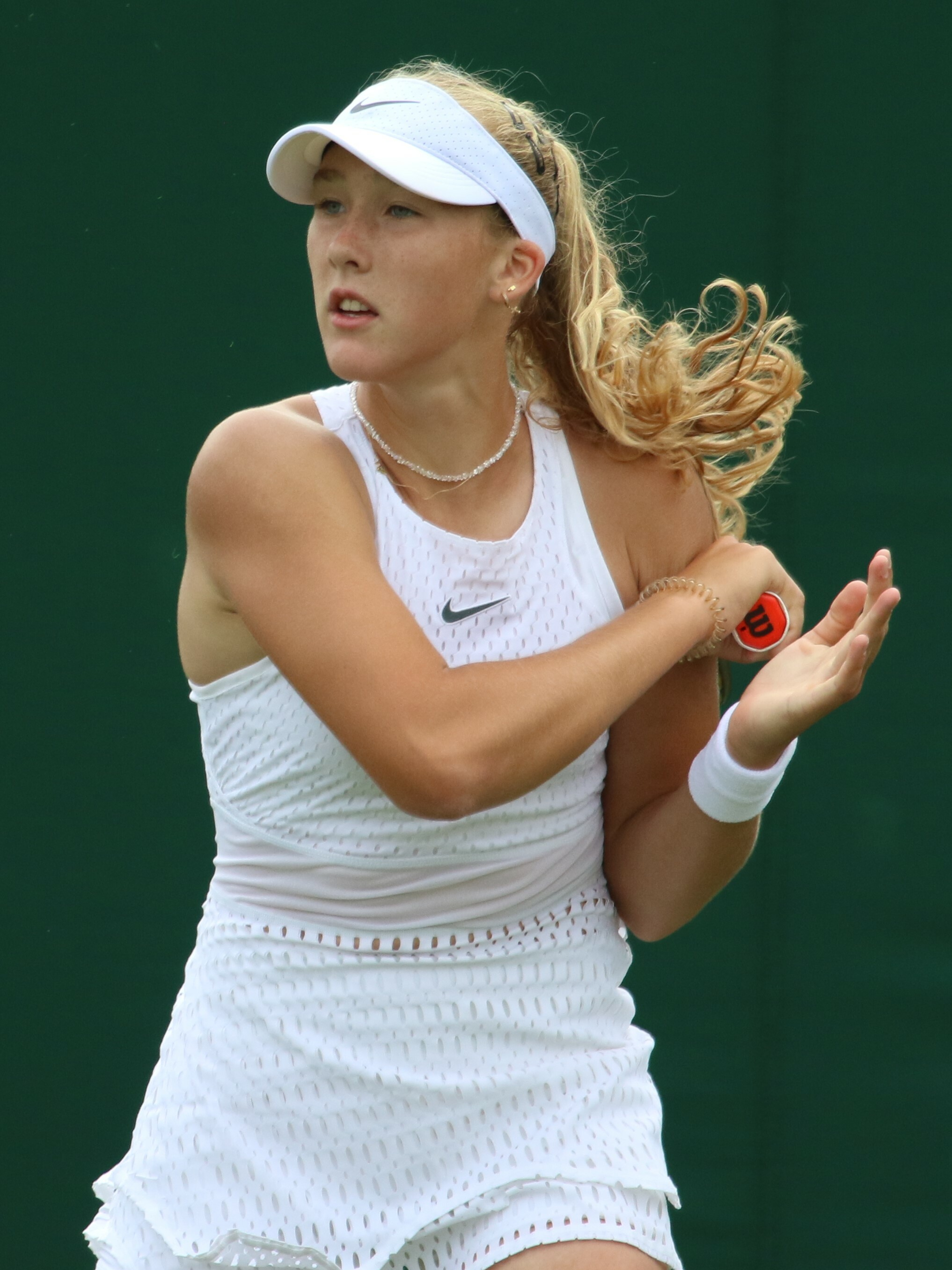
Mirra Andreeva won her first major title at the French Open, defeating Maja Chwalińska in the final.

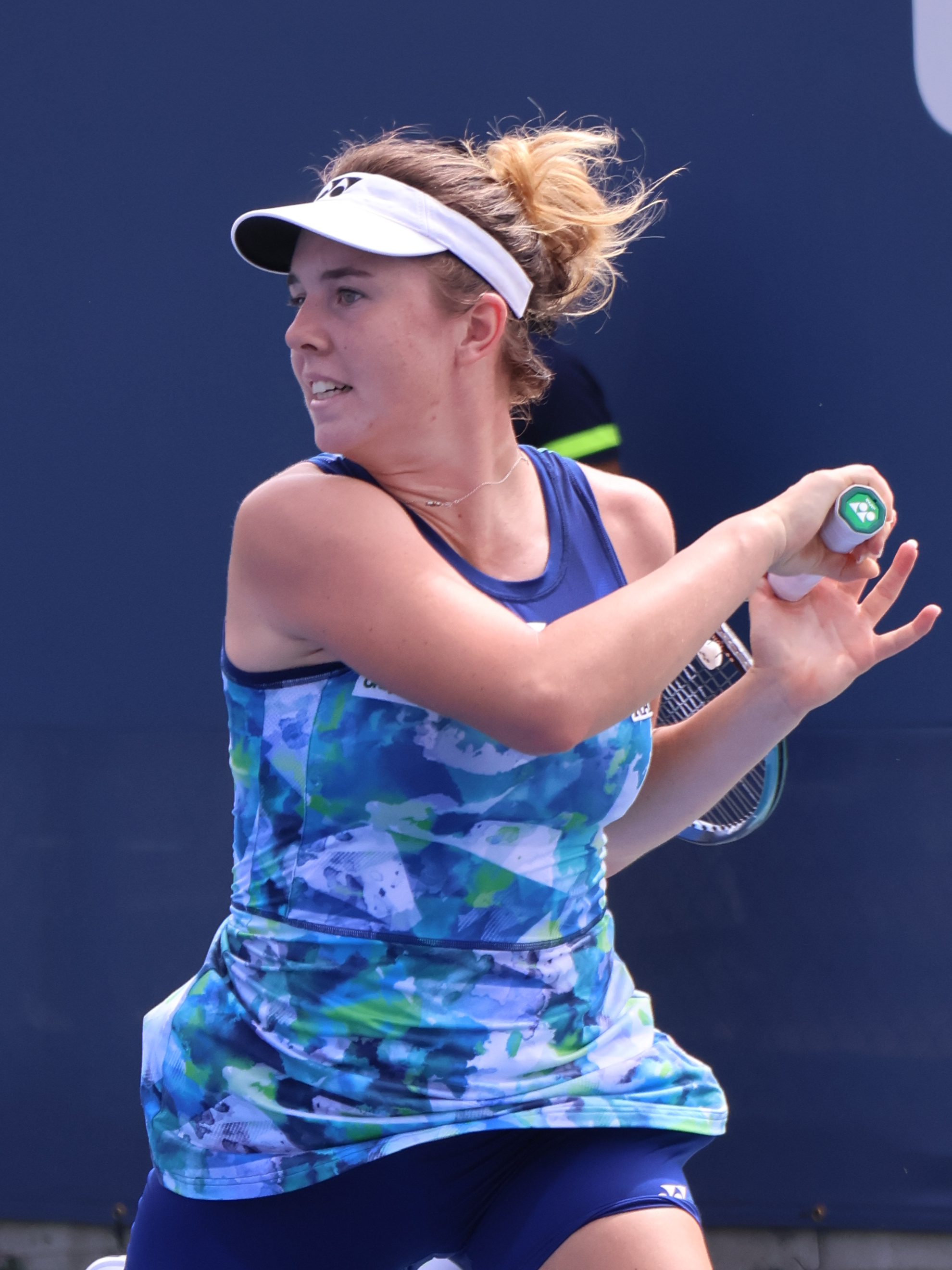
Linda Nosková won her first major title at the Wimbledon Championships, defeating Karolína Muchová in the final.

== Schedule ==
This is the complete schedule of events on the 2026 calendar.

Key

Grand Slam
WTA Finals
WTA 1000
WTA 500
WTA 250
Team events

=== January ===
| Week | Tournament | Champions | Runners-up | Semifinalists | Quarterfinalists |
|---|---|---|---|---|---|
| Dec 29; Jan 5 | United Cup; Perth/Sydney, Australia; United Cup; Hard – $5,903,345 – 18 teams | Poland; 2–1 | Switzerland | United States; Belgium | Greece; Australia; Argentina; Czech Republic |
| Dec 29; Jan 5 | Brisbane International; Brisbane, Australia; WTA 500; Hard – $1,691,602 – 48S/24Q/16D; Singles – Doubles | Aryna Sabalenka; 6–4, 6–3 | (Ukraine) Marta Kostyuk | (Czech Republic) Karolína Muchová (United States) Jessica Pegula | (United States) Madison Keys (Kazakhstan) Elena Rybakina; Liudmila Samsonova; Mirra Andreeva |
| Dec 29; Jan 5 | Brisbane International; Brisbane, Australia; WTA 500; Hard – $1,691,602 – 48S/24Q/16D; Singles – Doubles | (Chinese Taipei) Hsieh Su-wei (Latvia) Jeļena Ostapenko; 6–2, 6–1 | (Spain) Cristina Bucșa (Australia) Ellen Perez | (Czech Republic) Karolína Muchová (United States) Jessica Pegula | (United States) Madison Keys (Kazakhstan) Elena Rybakina; Liudmila Samsonova; Mirra Andreeva |
| Dec 29; Jan 5 | Auckland Open; Auckland, New Zealand; WTA 250; Hard – $283,347 – 32S/24Q/16D; Singles – Doubles | (Ukraine) Elina Svitolina; 6–3, 7–6^{(8–6)} | (China) Wang Xinyu | (United States) Iva Jovic (Philippines) Alexandra Eala | (United Kingdom) Sonay Kartal (Belgium) Sofia Costoulas (Poland) Magda Linette (United Kingdom) Francesca Jones |
| Dec 29; Jan 5 | Auckland Open; Auckland, New Zealand; WTA 250; Hard – $283,347 – 32S/24Q/16D; Singles – Doubles | (China) Guo Hanyu (France) Kristina Mladenovic; 7–6^{(9–7)}, 6–1 | (China) Xu Yifan (China) Yang Zhaoxuan | (United States) Iva Jovic (Philippines) Alexandra Eala | (United Kingdom) Sonay Kartal (Belgium) Sofia Costoulas (Poland) Magda Linette (United Kingdom) Francesca Jones |
| Jan 12 | Adelaide International; Adelaide, Australia; WTA 500; Hard – $1,206,446 – 30S/24Q/16D; Singles – Doubles | Mirra Andreeva; 6–3, 6–1 | (Canada) Victoria Mboko | Diana Shnaider (Australia) Kimberly Birrell | (Australia) Maya Joint (United States) Emma Navarro (Romania) Jaqueline Cristian (United States) Madison Keys |
| Jan 12 | Adelaide International; Adelaide, Australia; WTA 500; Hard – $1,206,446 – 30S/24Q/16D; Singles – Doubles | (Czech Republic) Kateřina Siniaková (China) Zhang Shuai; 6–1, 6–4 | (Ukraine) Lyudmyla Kichenok (United States) Desirae Krawczyk | Diana Shnaider (Australia) Kimberly Birrell | (Australia) Maya Joint (United States) Emma Navarro (Romania) Jaqueline Cristian (United States) Madison Keys |
| Jan 12 | Hobart International; Hobart, Australia; WTA 250; Hard – $283,347 – 32S/24Q/16D; Singles – Doubles | (Italy) Elisabetta Cocciaretto; 6–4, 6–4 | (United States) Iva Jovic | (Australia) Taylah Preston (Croatia) Antonia Ružić | (United Kingdom) Emma Raducanu (Poland) Magda Linette (Hungary) Anna Bondár (Serbia) Olga Danilović |
| Jan 12 | Hobart International; Hobart, Australia; WTA 250; Hard – $283,347 – 32S/24Q/16D; Singles – Doubles | (Poland) Katarzyna Piter (Indonesia) Janice Tjen; 6–2, 6–2 | (Belgium) Magali Kempen (Czech Republic) Anna Sisková | (Australia) Taylah Preston (Croatia) Antonia Ružić | (United Kingdom) Emma Raducanu (Poland) Magda Linette (Hungary) Anna Bondár (Serbia) Olga Danilović |
| Jan 19; Jan 26 | Australian Open; Melbourne, Australia; Grand Slam; Hard – $43,608,375 – 128S/128Q/64D/32X; Singles – Doubles – Mixed doubles | (Kazakhstan) Elena Rybakina; 6–4, 4–6, 6–4 | Aryna Sabalenka | (Ukraine) Elina Svitolina (United States) Jessica Pegula | (United States) Iva Jovic (United States) Coco Gauff (United States) Amanda Anisimova (Poland) Iga Świątek |
| Jan 19; Jan 26 | Australian Open; Melbourne, Australia; Grand Slam; Hard – $43,608,375 – 128S/128Q/64D/32X; Singles – Doubles – Mixed doubles | (Belgium) Elise Mertens (China) Zhang Shuai; 7–6^{(7–4)}, 6–4 | (Kazakhstan) Anna Danilina (Serbia) Aleksandra Krunić | (Ukraine) Elina Svitolina (United States) Jessica Pegula | (United States) Iva Jovic (United States) Coco Gauff (United States) Amanda Anisimova (Poland) Iga Świątek |
| Jan 19; Jan 26 | Australian Open; Melbourne, Australia; Grand Slam; Hard – $43,608,375 – 128S/128Q/64D/32X; Singles – Doubles – Mixed doubles | (Australia) Olivia Gadecki (Australia) John Peers; 4–6, 6–3, [10–8] | (France) Kristina Mladenovic (France) Manuel Guinard | (Ukraine) Elina Svitolina (United States) Jessica Pegula | (United States) Iva Jovic (United States) Coco Gauff (United States) Amanda Anisimova (Poland) Iga Świątek |

=== February ===
| Week | Tournament | Champions | Runners-up | Semifinalists | Quarterfinalists |
|---|---|---|---|---|---|
| Feb 2 | Abu Dhabi Open; Abu Dhabi, United Arab Emirates; WTA 500; Hard – $1,206,446 – 28S/24Q/16D; Singles – Doubles | (Czech Republic) Sára Bejlek; 7–6^{(7–5)}, 6–1 | Ekaterina Alexandrova | (Denmark) Clara Tauson (United States) Hailey Baptiste | (United Kingdom) Sonay Kartal (United States) McCartney Kessler; Liudmila Samsonova (Philippines) Alexandra Eala |
| Feb 2 | Abu Dhabi Open; Abu Dhabi, United Arab Emirates; WTA 500; Hard – $1,206,446 – 28S/24Q/16D; Singles – Doubles | Ekaterina Alexandrova (Australia) Maya Joint; 3–6, 7–6^{(7–5)}, [10–8] | (Slovakia) Tereza Mihalíková (United Kingdom) Olivia Nicholls | (Denmark) Clara Tauson (United States) Hailey Baptiste | (United Kingdom) Sonay Kartal (United States) McCartney Kessler; Liudmila Samsonova (Philippines) Alexandra Eala |
| Feb 2 | Ostrava Open; Ostrava, Czech Republic; WTA 250; Hard (i) – $283,347 – 30S/16Q/16D; Singles – Doubles | (United Kingdom) Katie Boulter; 5–7, 6–2, 6–1 | (Germany) Tamara Korpatsch | (United States) Katie Volynets (France) Diane Parry | (United States) Alycia Parks (Czech Republic) Linda Fruhvirtová (Czech Republic) Nikola Bartůňková (United States) Caty McNally |
| Feb 2 | Ostrava Open; Ostrava, Czech Republic; WTA 250; Hard (i) – $283,347 – 30S/16Q/16D; Singles – Doubles | (Czech Republic) Anastasia Dețiuc (United States) Sabrina Santamaria; 6–4, 7–6^{(7–4)} | (Czech Republic) Lucie Havlíčková (Czech Republic) Dominika Šalková | (United States) Katie Volynets (France) Diane Parry | (United States) Alycia Parks (Czech Republic) Linda Fruhvirtová (Czech Republic) Nikola Bartůňková (United States) Caty McNally |
| Feb 2 | Transylvania Open; Cluj-Napoca, Romania; WTA 250; Hard (i) – $283,347 – 32S/16Q/16D; Singles – Doubles | (Romania) Sorana Cîrstea; 6–0, 6–2 | (United Kingdom) Emma Raducanu | (Ukraine) Oleksandra Oliynykova (Ukraine) Daria Snigur | (Poland) Maja Chwalińska (China) Wang Xinyu (Austria) Anastasia Potapova (China) Yuan Yue |
| Feb 2 | Transylvania Open; Cluj-Napoca, Romania; WTA 250; Hard (i) – $283,347 – 32S/16Q/16D; Singles – Doubles | (Uzbekistan) Kamilla Rakhimova (Spain) Sara Sorribes Tormo; 7–6^{(9–7)}, 6–3 | (China) Wang Xinyu (China) Zheng Saisai | (Ukraine) Oleksandra Oliynykova (Ukraine) Daria Snigur | (Poland) Maja Chwalińska (China) Wang Xinyu (Austria) Anastasia Potapova (China) Yuan Yue |
| Feb 9 | Qatar Open; Doha, Qatar; WTA 1000; Hard – $4,088,211 – 56S/32Q/28D; Singles – Doubles | (Czech Republic) Karolína Muchová; 6–4, 7–5 | (Canada) Victoria Mboko | (Greece) Maria Sakkari (Latvia) Jeļena Ostapenko | (Poland) Iga Świątek; Anna Kalinskaya (Italy) Elisabetta Cocciaretto (Kazakhstan) Elena Rybakina |
| Feb 9 | Qatar Open; Doha, Qatar; WTA 1000; Hard – $4,088,211 – 56S/32Q/28D; Singles – Doubles | (Kazakhstan) Anna Danilina (Serbia) Aleksandra Krunić; 0–6, 7–6^{(7–3)}, [10–8] | (Chinese Taipei) Hsieh Su-wei (Latvia) Jeļena Ostapenko | (Greece) Maria Sakkari (Latvia) Jeļena Ostapenko | (Poland) Iga Świątek; Anna Kalinskaya (Italy) Elisabetta Cocciaretto (Kazakhstan) Elena Rybakina |
| Feb 16 | Dubai Tennis Championships; Dubai, UAE; WTA 1000; Hard – $4,088,211 – 56S/32Q/28D; Singles – Doubles | (United States) Jessica Pegula; 6–2, 6–4 | (Ukraine) Elina Svitolina | (United States) Coco Gauff (United States) Amanda Anisimova | (Croatia) Antonia Ružić (Philippines) Alexandra Eala (Denmark) Clara Tauson; Mirra Andreeva |
| Feb 16 | Dubai Tennis Championships; Dubai, UAE; WTA 1000; Hard – $4,088,211 – 56S/32Q/28D; Singles – Doubles | (Canada) Gabriela Dabrowski (Brazil) Luisa Stefani; 6–1, 6–3 | (Germany) Laura Siegemund; Vera Zvonareva | (United States) Coco Gauff (United States) Amanda Anisimova | (Croatia) Antonia Ružić (Philippines) Alexandra Eala (Denmark) Clara Tauson; Mirra Andreeva |
| Feb 23 | Mérida Open; Mérida, Mexico; WTA 500; Hard – $1,206,446 – 28S/24Q/16D; Singles – Doubles | (Spain) Cristina Bucșa; 6–1, 4–6, 6–4 | (Poland) Magdalena Fręch | (Italy) Jasmine Paolini (China) Zhang Shuai | (United Kingdom) Katie Boulter (Turkey) Zeynep Sönmez (Czech Republic) Marie Bouzková (Andorra) Victoria Jiménez Kasintseva |
| Feb 23 | Mérida Open; Mérida, Mexico; WTA 500; Hard – $1,206,446 – 28S/24Q/16D; Singles – Doubles | (Spain) Cristina Bucșa (China) Jiang Xinyu; 6–4, 6–1 | (Netherlands) Isabelle Haverlag (United Kingdom) Maia Lumsden | (Italy) Jasmine Paolini (China) Zhang Shuai | (United Kingdom) Katie Boulter (Turkey) Zeynep Sönmez (Czech Republic) Marie Bouzková (Andorra) Victoria Jiménez Kasintseva |
| Feb 23 | ATX Open; Austin, United States; WTA 250; Hard – $283,347 – 32S/16Q/16D; Singles – Doubles | (United States) Peyton Stearns; 7–6^{(10–8)}, 7–5 | (United States) Taylor Townsend | (United States) Ashlyn Krueger (Australia) Kimberly Birrell | (China) Yuan Yue (Switzerland) Rebeka Masarova; Oksana Selekhmeteva (Australia) Ajla Tomljanović |
| Feb 23 | ATX Open; Austin, United States; WTA 250; Hard – $283,347 – 32S/16Q/16D; Singles – Doubles | (Australia) Storm Hunter (United States) Taylor Townsend; 6–3, 6–4 | (Hong Kong) Eudice Chong (Chinese Taipei) Liang En-shuo | (United States) Ashlyn Krueger (Australia) Kimberly Birrell | (China) Yuan Yue (Switzerland) Rebeka Masarova; Oksana Selekhmeteva (Australia) Ajla Tomljanović |

=== March ===
| Week | Tournament | Champions | Runners-up | Semifinalists | Quarterfinalists |
|---|---|---|---|---|---|
| Mar 2 Mar 9 | Indian Wells Open; Indian Wells, United States; WTA 1000; Hard – $9,415,725 – 96S/48Q/32D/16X; Singles – Doubles – Mixed doubles | Aryna Sabalenka; 3–6, 6–3, 7–6^{(8–6)} | (Kazakhstan) Elena Rybakina | (Czech Republic) Linda Nosková (Ukraine) Elina Svitolina | (Canada) Victoria Mboko (Australia) Talia Gibson (United States) Jessica Pegula (Poland) Iga Świątek |
| Mar 2 Mar 9 | Indian Wells Open; Indian Wells, United States; WTA 1000; Hard – $9,415,725 – 96S/48Q/32D/16X; Singles – Doubles – Mixed doubles | (Czech Republic) Kateřina Siniaková (United States) Taylor Townsend; 7–6^{(7–4)}, 6–4 | (Kazakhstan) Anna Danilina (Serbia) Aleksandra Krunić | (Czech Republic) Linda Nosková (Ukraine) Elina Svitolina | (Canada) Victoria Mboko (Australia) Talia Gibson (United States) Jessica Pegula (Poland) Iga Świątek |
| Mar 2 Mar 9 | Indian Wells Open; Indian Wells, United States; WTA 1000; Hard – $9,415,725 – 96S/48Q/32D/16X; Singles – Doubles – Mixed doubles | (Switzerland) Belinda Bencic (Italy) Flavio Cobolli; 6–3, 2–6, [10–7] | (Canada) Gabriela Dabrowski (United Kingdom) Lloyd Glasspool | (Czech Republic) Linda Nosková (Ukraine) Elina Svitolina | (Canada) Victoria Mboko (Australia) Talia Gibson (United States) Jessica Pegula (Poland) Iga Świątek |
| Mar 16; Mar 23 | Miami Open; Miami Gardens, United States; WTA 1000; Hard – $9,415,725 – 96S/48Q/32D; Singles – Doubles | Aryna Sabalenka; 6–2, 4–6, 6–3 | (United States) Coco Gauff | (Kazakhstan) Elena Rybakina (Czech Republic) Karolína Muchová | (United States) Hailey Baptiste (United States) Jessica Pegula (Switzerland) Belinda Bencic (Canada) Victoria Mboko |
| Mar 16; Mar 23 | Miami Open; Miami Gardens, United States; WTA 1000; Hard – $9,415,725 – 96S/48Q/32D; Singles – Doubles | (Czech Republic) Kateřina Siniaková (United States) Taylor Townsend; 7–6^{(7–0)}, 6–1 | (Italy) Sara Errani (Italy) Jasmine Paolini | (Kazakhstan) Elena Rybakina (Czech Republic) Karolína Muchová | (United States) Hailey Baptiste (United States) Jessica Pegula (Switzerland) Belinda Bencic (Canada) Victoria Mboko |
| Mar 30 | Charleston Open; Charleston, United States; WTA 500; Clay (green) – $2,300,000 – 48S/24Q/16D; Singles – Doubles | (United States) Jessica Pegula; 6–2, 6–2 | (Ukraine) Yuliia Starodubtseva | (United States) Iva Jovic (United States) Madison Keys | Diana Shnaider; Anna Kalinskaya (Switzerland) Belinda Bencic (United States) McCartney Kessler |
| Mar 30 | Charleston Open; Charleston, United States; WTA 500; Clay (green) – $2,300,000 – 48S/24Q/16D; Singles – Doubles | (United States) Desirae Krawczyk (United States) Caty McNally; 6–3, 6–2 | (Hungary) Anna Bondár (Poland) Magdalena Fręch | (United States) Iva Jovic (United States) Madison Keys | Diana Shnaider; Anna Kalinskaya (Switzerland) Belinda Bencic (United States) McCartney Kessler |
| Mar 30 | Copa Colsanitas; Bogotá, Colombia; WTA 250; Clay – $283,347 – 32S/16Q/16D; Singles – Doubles | (Czech Republic) Marie Bouzková; 6–7^{(7–9)}, 6–2, 6–2 | (Hungary) Panna Udvardy | (Argentina) Jazmín Ortenzi (Colombia) Emiliana Arango | (Latvia) Darja Semeņistaja (Argentina) Julia Riera (Poland) Katarzyna Kawa (United States) Varvara Lepchenko |
| Mar 30 | Copa Colsanitas; Bogotá, Colombia; WTA 250; Clay – $283,347 – 32S/16Q/16D; Singles – Doubles | (United States) Caroline Dolehide; Irina Khromacheva; 7–6^{(7–5)}, 6–4 | (Ukraine) Valeriya Strakhova; Anastasia Tikhonova | (Argentina) Jazmín Ortenzi (Colombia) Emiliana Arango | (Latvia) Darja Semeņistaja (Argentina) Julia Riera (Poland) Katarzyna Kawa (United States) Varvara Lepchenko |

=== April ===
| Week | Tournament | Champions | Runners-up | Semifinalists | Quarterfinalists |
|---|---|---|---|---|---|
| Apr 6 | Billie Jean King Cup qualifying round | Qualifying-round winners Italy; Belgium; Great Britain; Kazakhstan; Spain; Czechia; Ukraine | Qualifying-round losers Japan; United States; Australia; Canada; Slovenia; Switzerland; Poland | | |
| Apr 6 | Linz Open; Linz, Austria; WTA 500; Clay (i) – €1,049,083 – 28S/16Q/16D; Singles – Doubles | Mirra Andreeva; 1–6, 6–4, 6–3 | (Austria) Anastasia Potapova | (Romania) Elena-Gabriela Ruse (Croatia) Donna Vekić | (Romania) Sorana Cîrstea (Latvia) Jeļena Ostapenko (Austria) Lilli Tagger (Czech Republic) Karolína Plíšková |
| Apr 6 | Linz Open; Linz, Austria; WTA 500; Clay (i) – €1,049,083 – 28S/16Q/16D; Singles – Doubles | (Romania) Sorana Cîrstea (China) Zhang Shuai; 6–3, 6–2 | (Czech Republic) Jesika Malečková (Czech Republic) Miriam Škoch | (Romania) Elena-Gabriela Ruse (Croatia) Donna Vekić | (Romania) Sorana Cîrstea (Latvia) Jeļena Ostapenko (Austria) Lilli Tagger (Czech Republic) Karolína Plíšková |
| Apr 13 | Stuttgart Open; Stuttgart, Germany; WTA 500; Clay (i) – €1,049,083 – 28S/16Q/16D; Singles – Doubles | (Kazakhstan) Elena Rybakina; 7–5, 6–1 | (Czech Republic) Karolína Muchová | Mirra Andreeva (Ukraine) Elina Svitolina | (Canada) Leylah Fernandez (Poland) Iga Świątek (Czech Republic) Linda Nosková (United States) Coco Gauff |
| Apr 13 | Stuttgart Open; Stuttgart, Germany; WTA 500; Clay (i) – €1,049,083 – 28S/16Q/16D; Singles – Doubles | (United States) Nicole Melichar-Martinez; Liudmila Samsonova; 6–1, 6–1 | (Latvia) Jeļena Ostapenko (China) Zhang Shuai | Mirra Andreeva (Ukraine) Elina Svitolina | (Canada) Leylah Fernandez (Poland) Iga Świątek (Czech Republic) Linda Nosková (United States) Coco Gauff |
| Apr 13 | Open de Rouen; Rouen, France; WTA 250; Clay (i) – €246,388 – 32S/24Q/16D; Singles – Doubles | (Ukraine) Marta Kostyuk; 6–3, 6–4 | (Ukraine) Veronika Podrez | (Germany) Tatjana Maria (Romania) Sorana Cîrstea | (United States) Ann Li; Iryna Shymanovich (United Kingdom) Katie Boulter (Hungary) Anna Bondár |
| Apr 13 | Open de Rouen; Rouen, France; WTA 250; Clay (i) – €246,388 – 32S/24Q/16D; Singles – Doubles | (Czech Republic) Jesika Malečková (Czech Republic) Miriam Škoch; 6–2, 7–5 | (Chinese Taipei) Liang En-shuo (China) Tang Qianhui | (Germany) Tatjana Maria (Romania) Sorana Cîrstea | (United States) Ann Li; Iryna Shymanovich (United Kingdom) Katie Boulter (Hungary) Anna Bondár |
| Apr 20; Apr 27 | Madrid Open; Madrid, Spain; WTA 1000; Clay – €8,235,540 – 96S/48Q/32D; Singles – Doubles | (Ukraine) Marta Kostyuk; 6–3, 7–5 | Mirra Andreeva | (United States) Hailey Baptiste (Austria) Anastasia Potapova | Aryna Sabalenka (Canada) Leylah Fernandez (Czech Republic) Linda Nosková (Czech Republic) Karolina Plíšková |
| Apr 20; Apr 27 | Madrid Open; Madrid, Spain; WTA 1000; Clay – €8,235,540 – 96S/48Q/32D; Singles – Doubles | (Czech Republic) Kateřina Siniaková (United States) Taylor Townsend; 7–6^{(7–2)}, 6–2 | Mirra Andreeva; Diana Shnaider | (United States) Hailey Baptiste (Austria) Anastasia Potapova | Aryna Sabalenka (Canada) Leylah Fernandez (Czech Republic) Linda Nosková (Czech Republic) Karolina Plíšková |

=== May ===
| Week | Tournament | Champions | Runners-up | Semifinalists | Quarterfinalists |
|---|---|---|---|---|---|
| May 4 May 11 | Italian Open; Rome, Italy; WTA 1000; Clay – €7,228,080 – 96S/48Q/32D; Singles – Doubles | (Ukraine) Elina Svitolina; 6–4, 6–7^{(3–7)}, 6–2 | (United States) Coco Gauff | (Romania) Sorana Cîrstea (Poland) Iga Świątek | (Latvia) Jeļena Ostapenko; Mirra Andreeva (United States) Jessica Pegula (Kazakhstan) Elena Rybakina |
| May 4 May 11 | Italian Open; Rome, Italy; WTA 1000; Clay – €7,228,080 – 96S/48Q/32D; Singles – Doubles | Mirra Andreeva; Diana Shnaider; 6–3, 6–3 | (Spain) Cristina Bucșa (United States) Nicole Melichar-Martinez | (Romania) Sorana Cîrstea (Poland) Iga Świątek | (Latvia) Jeļena Ostapenko; Mirra Andreeva (United States) Jessica Pegula (Kazakhstan) Elena Rybakina |
| May 18 | Internationaux de Strasbourg; Strasbourg, France; WTA 500; Clay – €1,049,083 – 28S/16Q/16D; Singles – Doubles | (United States) Emma Navarro; 6–0, 5–7, 6–2 | (Canada) Victoria Mboko | (Romania) Jaqueline Cristian (United States) Ann Li | (Canada) Leylah Fernandez (Australia) Daria Kasatkina (China) Zhang Shuai (Czech Republic) Marie Bouzková |
| May 18 | Internationaux de Strasbourg; Strasbourg, France; WTA 500; Clay – €1,049,083 – 28S/16Q/16D; Singles – Doubles | (Canada) Gabriela Dabrowski (Brazil) Luisa Stefani; 7–5, 6–4 | (Norway) Ulrikke Eikeri (United States) Quinn Gleason | (Romania) Jaqueline Cristian (United States) Ann Li | (Canada) Leylah Fernandez (Australia) Daria Kasatkina (China) Zhang Shuai (Czech Republic) Marie Bouzková |
| May 18 | Morocco Open; Rabat, Morocco; WTA 250; Clay – $283,347 – 32S/16Q/16D; Singles – Doubles | (Croatia) Petra Marčinko; 6–2, 3–0 ret. | (Ukraine) Anhelina Kalinina | (Hungary) Panna Udvardy (Switzerland) Jil Teichmann | (Colombia) Camila Osorio (Hungary) Anna Bondár (Morocco) Yasmine Kabbaj (Spain) Jéssica Bouzas Maneiro |
| May 18 | Morocco Open; Rabat, Morocco; WTA 250; Clay – $283,347 – 32S/16Q/16D; Singles – Doubles | (Hong Kong) Eudice Chong (Belgium) Magali Kempen; 6–3, 2–6, [10–6] | (Indonesia) Aldila Sutjiadi; Vera Zvonareva | (Hungary) Panna Udvardy (Switzerland) Jil Teichmann | (Colombia) Camila Osorio (Hungary) Anna Bondár (Morocco) Yasmine Kabbaj (Spain) Jéssica Bouzas Maneiro |
| May 25; Jun 1 | French Open; Paris, France; Grand Slam; Clay – €29,137,500 – 128S/64D/32X; Singles – Doubles – Mixed doubles | Mirra Andreeva; 6–3, 6–2 | (Poland) Maja Chwalińska | Diana Shnaider (Ukraine) Marta Kostyuk | Aryna Sabalenka; Anna Kalinskaya (Ukraine) Elina Svitolina (Romania) Sorana Cîrstea |
| May 25; Jun 1 | French Open; Paris, France; Grand Slam; Clay – €29,137,500 – 128S/64D/32X; Singles – Doubles – Mixed doubles | (Czech Republic) Kateřina Siniaková (United States) Taylor Townsend; 6–2, 7–5 | (Kazakhstan) Anna Danilina (Serbia) Aleksandra Krunić | Diana Shnaider (Ukraine) Marta Kostyuk | Aryna Sabalenka; Anna Kalinskaya (Ukraine) Elina Svitolina (Romania) Sorana Cîrstea |
| May 25; Jun 1 | French Open; Paris, France; Grand Slam; Clay – €29,137,500 – 128S/64D/32X; Singles – Doubles – Mixed doubles | (Italy) Sara Errani (Italy) Andrea Vavassori; 4–6, 6–3, [10–4] | (Canada) Gabriela Dabrowski (United States) Evan King | Diana Shnaider (Ukraine) Marta Kostyuk | Aryna Sabalenka; Anna Kalinskaya (Ukraine) Elina Svitolina (Romania) Sorana Cîrstea |

=== June ===
| Week | Tournament | Champions | Runners-up | Semifinalists | Quarterfinalists |
|---|---|---|---|---|---|
| Jun 8 | Queen's Club Championships; London, United Kingdom; WTA 500; Grass – $1,915,000 – 28S/24Q/16D; Singles – Doubles | (Croatia) Donna Vekić; 6–0, 7–6^{(8–6)} | (United Kingdom) Emma Raducanu | (United Kingdom) Katie Boulter (United States) Iva Jovic | (Kazakhstan) Elena Rybakina (Czech Republic) Karolína Plíšková (Uzbekistan) Kamilla Rakhimova (United States) Amanda Anisimova |
| Jun 8 | Queen's Club Championships; London, United Kingdom; WTA 500; Grass – $1,915,000 – 28S/24Q/16D; Singles – Doubles | (Slovakia) Tereza Mihalíková (United Kingdom) Olivia Nicholls; 6–3, 6–7^{(4–7)}, [10–5] | (Canada) Leylah Fernandez (Germany) Laura Siegemund | (United Kingdom) Katie Boulter (United States) Iva Jovic | (Kazakhstan) Elena Rybakina (Czech Republic) Karolína Plíšková (Uzbekistan) Kamilla Rakhimova (United States) Amanda Anisimova |
| Jun 8 | Rosmalen Championships; Rosmalen, Netherlands; WTA 250; Grass – €246,388 – 32S/24Q/16D; Singles – Doubles | (United States) Robin Montgomery; Walkover | (Czech Republic) Barbora Krejčíková | (Australia) Ajla Tomljanović (Poland) Magda Linette | (Ukraine) Daria Snigur (United States) Caty McNally (Romania) Elena-Gabriela Ruse (Turkey) Zeynep Sönmez |
| Jun 8 | Rosmalen Championships; Rosmalen, Netherlands; WTA 250; Grass – €246,388 – 32S/24Q/16D; Singles – Doubles | (Japan) Shuko Aoyama (Chinese Taipei) Liang En-shuo; 6–2, 2–6, [10–7] | (Estonia) Ingrid Neel (Mexico) Giuliana Olmos | (Australia) Ajla Tomljanović (Poland) Magda Linette | (Ukraine) Daria Snigur (United States) Caty McNally (Romania) Elena-Gabriela Ruse (Turkey) Zeynep Sönmez |
| Jun 15 | German Open; Berlin, Germany; WTA 500; Grass – €1,206,446 – 28S/24Q/16D; Singles – Doubles | (Czech Republic) Linda Nosková; 6–4, 4–6, 6–3 | (United States) Jessica Pegula | Aryna Sabalenka (Philippines) Alexandra Eala | (Czech Republic) Nikola Bartůňková (United States) Madison Keys (Spain) Paula Badosa (Ukraine) Elina Svitolina |
| Jun 15 | German Open; Berlin, Germany; WTA 500; Grass – €1,206,446 – 28S/24Q/16D; Singles – Doubles | Ekaterina Alexandrova (Czech Republic) Linda Nosková; 6–2, 6–4 | (Italy) Sara Errani (United States) Nicole Melichar-Martinez | Aryna Sabalenka (Philippines) Alexandra Eala | (Czech Republic) Nikola Bartůňková (United States) Madison Keys (Spain) Paula Badosa (Ukraine) Elina Svitolina |
| Jun 15 | Nottingham Open; Nottingham, United Kingdom; WTA 250; Grass – $283,347 – 32S/24Q/16D; Singles – Doubles | (Czech Republic) Marie Bouzková; 7–6^{(7–5)}, 4–6, 6–2 | (United States) Emma Navarro | (Czech Republic) Karolína Plíšková (Switzerland) Viktorija Golubic | (Australia) Talia Gibson (Germany) Tatjana Maria (Spain) Jéssica Bouzas Maneiro (United States) Ann Li |
| Jun 15 | Nottingham Open; Nottingham, United Kingdom; WTA 250; Grass – $283,347 – 32S/24Q/16D; Singles – Doubles | (United Kingdom) Harriet Dart (United Kingdom) Maia Lumsden; 6–3, 6–4 | (Japan) Shuko Aoyama (Chinese Taipei) Chan Hao-ching | (Czech Republic) Karolína Plíšková (Switzerland) Viktorija Golubic | (Australia) Talia Gibson (Germany) Tatjana Maria (Spain) Jéssica Bouzas Maneiro (United States) Ann Li |
| Jun 21 | Bad Homburg Open; Bad Homburg, Germany; WTA 500; Grass – €1,049,083 – 28S/16Q/16D; Singles – Doubles | (Czech Republic) Karolína Muchová; 6–1, 1–0 ret. | (Japan) Naomi Osaka | (Romania) Elena-Gabriela Ruse (China) Wang Xinyu | (United States) Emma Navarro (Denmark) Clara Tauson (Ukraine) Elina Svitolina; Ekaterina Alexandrova |
| Jun 21 | Bad Homburg Open; Bad Homburg, Germany; WTA 500; Grass – €1,049,083 – 28S/16Q/16D; Singles – Doubles | (Indonesia) Aldila Sutjiadi; Vera Zvonareva; 6–1, 4–6, [10–5] | (Australia) Ellen Perez (Netherlands) Demi Schuurs | (Romania) Elena-Gabriela Ruse (China) Wang Xinyu | (United States) Emma Navarro (Denmark) Clara Tauson (Ukraine) Elina Svitolina; Ekaterina Alexandrova |
| Jun 21 | Eastbourne Open; Eastbourne, United Kingdom; WTA 250; Grass – $499,000 – 32S/24Q/16D; Singles – Doubles | (United States) Madison Keys; 7–5, 6–4 | (Germany) Tatjana Maria | (Latvia) Jeļena Ostapenko (Croatia) Petra Marčinko | (Czech Republic) Tereza Valentová (Turkey) Zeynep Sönmez (United States) Caty McNally (United States) McCartney Kessler |
| Jun 21 | Eastbourne Open; Eastbourne, United Kingdom; WTA 250; Grass – $499,000 – 32S/24Q/16D; Singles – Doubles | (Canada) Gabriela Dabrowski (Brazil) Luisa Stefani; 6–1, 6–4 | (Czech Republic) Jesika Malečková (Czech Republic) Miriam Škoch | (Latvia) Jeļena Ostapenko (Croatia) Petra Marčinko | (Czech Republic) Tereza Valentová (Turkey) Zeynep Sönmez (United States) Caty McNally (United States) McCartney Kessler |
| Jun 29; Jul 6 | Wimbledon; London, United Kingdom; Grand Slam; Grass – €64,200,000 – 128S/64D/32X; Singles – Doubles – Mixed doubles | (Czech Republic) Linda Nosková; 6–2, 5–7, 6–3 | (Czech Republic) Karolína Muchová | (United States) Coco Gauff (Ukraine) Marta Kostyuk | (Japan) Naomi Osaka (United States) Jessica Pegula (Italy) Jasmine Paolini (Belgium) Elise Mertens |
| Jun 29; Jul 6 | Wimbledon; London, United Kingdom; Grand Slam; Grass – €64,200,000 – 128S/64D/32X; Singles – Doubles – Mixed doubles | (China) Guo Hanyu (France) Kristina Mladenovic; 6–3, 7–5 | (Canada) Gabriela Dabrowski (Brazil) Luisa Stefani | (United States) Coco Gauff (Ukraine) Marta Kostyuk | (Japan) Naomi Osaka (United States) Jessica Pegula (Italy) Jasmine Paolini (Belgium) Elise Mertens |
| Jun 29; Jul 6 | Wimbledon; London, United Kingdom; Grand Slam; Grass – €64,200,000 – 128S/64D/32X; Singles – Doubles – Mixed doubles | (Latvia) Jeļena Ostapenko (El Salvador) Marcelo Arévalo; 4–6, 7–5, 6–2 | (Australia) Storm Hunter (Australia) Marc Polmans | (United States) Coco Gauff (Ukraine) Marta Kostyuk | (Japan) Naomi Osaka (United States) Jessica Pegula (Italy) Jasmine Paolini (Belgium) Elise Mertens |

=== July ===
| Week | Tournament | Champions | Runners-up | Semifinalists | Quarterfinalists |
|---|---|---|---|---|---|
| Jul 13 | Iași Open; Iași, Romania; WTA 250; Clay – €246,388 – 32S/24Q/16D; Singles – Doubles | (Egypt) Mayar Sherif; 6–4, 4–0 ret. | (Spain) Paula Badosa | (Ukraine) Oleksandra Oliynykova (Slovenia) Tamara Zidanšek | (Kazakhstan) Yulia Putintseva (France) Clara Burel (Hungary) Panna Udvardy (Croatia) Petra Marčinko |
| Jul 13 | Iași Open; Iași, Romania; WTA 250; Clay – €246,388 – 32S/24Q/16D; Singles – Doubles | (Czech Republic) Anastasia Dețiuc; Irina Khromacheva; 4–6, 6–2, [10–5] | (Armenia) Alina Charaeva (Kazakhstan) Zhibek Kulambayeva | (Ukraine) Oleksandra Oliynykova (Slovenia) Tamara Zidanšek | (Kazakhstan) Yulia Putintseva (France) Clara Burel (Hungary) Panna Udvardy (Croatia) Petra Marčinko |
| Jul 13 | Athens Open; Athens, Greece; WTA 250; Hard – €246,388 – 32S/21Q/16D; Singles – Doubles | (Czech Republic) Barbora Krejčíková; 7–6^{(7–5)}, 6–3 | (Greece) Maria Sakkari | (Denmark) Clara Tauson; Alina Korneeva | (Czech Republic) Sára Bejlek (China) Zheng Qinwen (United States) Alycia Parks (Czech Republic) Tereza Valentová |
| Jul 13 | Athens Open; Athens, Greece; WTA 250; Hard – €246,388 – 32S/21Q/16D; Singles – Doubles | (Chinese Taipei) Chan Hao-ching (Japan) Miyu Kato; 7–6^{(7–3)}, 4–6, [10–7] | (United Kingdom) Maia Lumsden (China) Tang Qianhui | (Denmark) Clara Tauson; Alina Korneeva | (Czech Republic) Sára Bejlek (China) Zheng Qinwen (United States) Alycia Parks (Czech Republic) Tereza Valentová |
| Jul 20 | Hamburg Open; Hamburg, Germany; WTA 250; Clay – €246,388 – 32S/24Q/16D; Singles – Doubles | (Germany) Tamara Korpatsch; 6–3, 6–3 | (Hungary) Anna Bondár | (Armenia) Elina Avanesyan (Egypt) Mayar Sherif | (Ukraine) Oleksandra Oliynykova (Armenia) Alina Charaeva (Spain) Paula Badosa (Ukraine) Anhelina Kalinina |
| Jul 20 | Hamburg Open; Hamburg, Germany; WTA 250; Clay – €246,388 – 32S/24Q/16D; Singles – Doubles | (Slovenia) Dalila Jakupović (Slovenia) Nika Radišić; 5–7, 6–3, [10–5] | (Belgium) Magali Kempen; Alexandra Panova | (Armenia) Elina Avanesyan (Egypt) Mayar Sherif | (Ukraine) Oleksandra Oliynykova (Armenia) Alina Charaeva (Spain) Paula Badosa (Ukraine) Anhelina Kalinina |
| Jul 20 | Prague Open; Prague, Czech Republic; WTA 250; Hard – $283,347 – 32S/24Q/16D; Singles – Doubles | (Austria) Lilli Tagger; 7–6^{(7–3)}, 6–2 | (Ukraine) Daria Snigur | (Czech Republic) Tereza Valentová (Czech Republic) Barbora Krejčíková | (Czech Republic) Marie Bouzková (Thailand) Lanlana Tararudee (Czech Republic) Sára Bejlek (Czech Republic) Dominika Šalková |
| Jul 20 | Prague Open; Prague, Czech Republic; WTA 250; Hard – $283,347 – 32S/24Q/16D; Singles – Doubles | (United Kingdom) Harriet Dart (United Kingdom) Maia Lumsden; 6–4, 6–4 | (Czech Republic) Lucie Havlíčková (Czech Republic) Laura Samson | (Czech Republic) Tereza Valentová (Czech Republic) Barbora Krejčíková | (Czech Republic) Marie Bouzková (Thailand) Lanlana Tararudee (Czech Republic) Sára Bejlek (Czech Republic) Dominika Šalková |
| Jul 27 | Washington Open; Washington DC, United States; WTA 500; Hard – $1,637,982 – 28S/16Q/16D; Singles – Doubles | (Philippines) Alexandra Eala; 4–6, 6–4, 6–0 | (United States) Jessica Pegula | Diana Shnaider (Japan) Naomi Osaka | Anna Kalinskaya; Liudmila Samsonova (Italy) Elisabetta Cocciaretto (Ukraine) Elina Svitolina |
| Jul 27 | Washington Open; Washington DC, United States; WTA 500; Hard – $1,637,982 – 28S/16Q/16D; Singles – Doubles | (New Zealand) Erin Routliffe (Indonesia) Aldila Sutjiadi; 6–4, 6–1 | (Slovenia) Andreja Klepač (Japan) Makoto Ninomiya | Diana Shnaider (Japan) Naomi Osaka | Anna Kalinskaya; Liudmila Samsonova (Italy) Elisabetta Cocciaretto (Ukraine) Elina Svitolina |
| Jul 27 | Memphis Classic; Memphis, United States; WTA 250; Hard – $283,347 – 32S/19Q/16D; Singles – Doubles | Kristina Liutova; 1–6, 6–1, 6–3 | (Czech Republic) Darja Vidmanova | (United States) Elvina Kalieva (Mexico) Renata Zarazúa | (United States) Caty McNally (United States) Peyton Stearns (United States) Katie Volynets; Anastasia Zakharova |
| Jul 27 | Memphis Classic; Memphis, United States; WTA 250; Hard – $283,347 – 32S/19Q/16D; Singles – Doubles | Maria Kozyreva (United Kingdom) Maia Lumsden; 7–6^{(8–6)}, 6–3 | (Chinese Taipei) Chan Hao-ching (Australia) Maya Joint | (United States) Elvina Kalieva (Mexico) Renata Zarazúa | (United States) Caty McNally (United States) Peyton Stearns (United States) Katie Volynets; Anastasia Zakharova |

=== August ===
| Week | Tournament | Champions | Runners-up | Semifinalists | Quarterfinalists |
|---|---|---|---|---|---|
| Aug 3 Aug 10 | Canadian Open; Toronto, Canada; WTA 1000; Hard – $7,433,076 – 96S/32Q/32D; Singles – Doubles | (Poland) Iga Świątek; 6–2, 6–3 | (Kazakhstan) Elena Rybakina | (Ukraine) Elina Svitolina (United States) Coco Gauff | Ekaterina Alexandrova; Diana Shnaider (Switzerland) Belinda Bencic (Japan) Naomi Osaka |
| Aug 3 Aug 10 | Canadian Open; Toronto, Canada; WTA 1000; Hard – $7,433,076 – 96S/32Q/32D; Singles – Doubles | (Czech Republic) Kateřina Siniaková (China) Zhang Shuai; 6–3, 6–4 | (Italy) Sara Errani (United States) Nicole Melichar-Martinez | (Ukraine) Elina Svitolina (United States) Coco Gauff | Ekaterina Alexandrova; Diana Shnaider (Switzerland) Belinda Bencic (Japan) Naomi Osaka |
| Aug 10; Aug 17 | Cincinnati Open; Mason, United States; WTA 1000; Hard – $7,433,076 – 96S/48Q/32D; Singles – Doubles | (United States) Coco Gauff; 6–2, 6–4 | (United States) Jessica Pegula | (Czech Republic) Sára Bejlek (Poland) Iga Świątek | (United States) Madison Keys (Ukraine) Marta Kostyuk (United States) Amanda Anisimova (Kazakhstan) Elena Rybakina |
| Aug 10; Aug 17 | Cincinnati Open; Mason, United States; WTA 1000; Hard – $7,433,076 – 96S/48Q/32D; Singles – Doubles | (Czech Republic) Marie Bouzková (Czech Republic) Linda Nosková; 6–1, 6–2 | (Belgium) Magali Kempen; Alexandra Panova | (Czech Republic) Sára Bejlek (Poland) Iga Świątek | (United States) Madison Keys (Ukraine) Marta Kostyuk (United States) Amanda Anisimova (Kazakhstan) Elena Rybakina |
| Aug 24 | Monterrey Open; Monterrey, Mexico; WTA 500; Hard – $1,206,446 – 28S/16Q/16D; Singles – Doubles | (France) Diane Parry; 6–4, 0–6, 6–3 | (Belgium) Elise Mertens | (United States) Ann Li (Czech Republic) Nikola Bartůňková | (Denmark) Clara Tauson (United States) Alycia Parks (Czech Republic) Darja Vidmanova (Ukraine) Yuliia Starodubtseva |
| Aug 24 | Monterrey Open; Monterrey, Mexico; WTA 500; Hard – $1,206,446 – 28S/16Q/16D; Singles – Doubles | (Australia) Maya Joint (China) Xu Yifan; 6–2, 4–6, [10–5] | Maria Kozyreva (United Kingdom) Maia Lumsden | (United States) Ann Li (Czech Republic) Nikola Bartůňková | (Denmark) Clara Tauson (United States) Alycia Parks (Czech Republic) Darja Vidmanova (Ukraine) Yuliia Starodubtseva |
| Aug 31; Sep 7 | US Open; New York, United States; Grand Slam; Hard – $54,000,000 – 128S/64D/16X; Singles – Doubles – Mixed doubles | (Kazakhstan) Elena Rybakina; 6–4, 5–7, 6–2 | Aryna Sabalenka | (United States) Jessica Pegula (United States) Coco Gauff | (Czech Republic) Linda Nosková (United States) Emma Navarro; Mirra Andreeva (China) Zheng Qinwen |
| Aug 31; Sep 7 | US Open; New York, United States; Grand Slam; Hard – $54,000,000 – 128S/64D/16X; Singles – Doubles – Mixed doubles | (Czech Republic) Kateřina Siniaková (United States) Taylor Townsend; 5–7, 6–0, 6–2 | (United States) Ashlyn Krueger (United States) Robin Montgomery | (United States) Jessica Pegula (United States) Coco Gauff | (Czech Republic) Linda Nosková (United States) Emma Navarro; Mirra Andreeva (China) Zheng Qinwen |
| Aug 31; Sep 7 | US Open; New York, United States; Grand Slam; Hard – $54,000,000 – 128S/64D/16X; Singles – Doubles – Mixed doubles | (Czech Republic) Karolína Muchová (Czech Republic) Jakub Menšík; 6–3, 1–6, [10–6] | (Switzerland) Belinda Bencic (Italy) Flavio Cobolli | (United States) Jessica Pegula (United States) Coco Gauff | (Czech Republic) Linda Nosková (United States) Emma Navarro; Mirra Andreeva (China) Zheng Qinwen |

=== September ===
| Week | Tournament | Champions | Runners-up | Semifinalists | Quarterfinalists |
|---|---|---|---|---|---|
| Sep 14 | Guadalajara Open; Guadalajara, Mexico; WTA 500; Hard – $1,206,446 – 28S/16Q/16D; Singles – Doubles | (United States) Iva Jovic; 6–4, 6–2 | (United States) Peyton Stearns | Liudmila Samsonova (Spain) Cristina Bucșa | (Ukraine) Marta Kostyuk (United States) Sloane Stephens (Czech Republic) Sára Bejlek (Poland) Magdalena Fręch |
| Sep 14 | Guadalajara Open; Guadalajara, Mexico; WTA 500; Hard – $1,206,446 – 28S/16Q/16D; Singles – Doubles | (Spain) Cristina Bucșa (United States) Nicole Melichar-Martinez; 6–2, 5–7, [10–5] | (Japan) Momoko Kobori (Thailand) Peangtarn Plipuech | Liudmila Samsonova (Spain) Cristina Bucșa | (Ukraine) Marta Kostyuk (United States) Sloane Stephens (Czech Republic) Sára Bejlek (Poland) Magdalena Fręch |
| Sep 14 | SP Open; São Paulo, Brazil; WTA 250; Hard – $283,347 – 32S/16Q/16D; Singles – Doubles | (Spain) Kaitlin Quevedo; 4–6, 6–4, 6–2 | (Argentina) Nadia Podoroska | (France) Anna Blinkova (Spain) Paula Badosa | (Serbia) Teodora Kostović (Armenia) Alina Charaeva (Netherlands) Suzan Lamens (United States) Mary Stoiana |
| Sep 14 | SP Open; São Paulo, Brazil; WTA 250; Hard – $283,347 – 32S/16Q/16D; Singles – Doubles | (Canada) Gabriela Dabrowski (Brazil) Luisa Stefani; 6–3, 3–6, [10–7] | (United States) Anna Rogers (United States) Allura Zamarripa | (France) Anna Blinkova (Spain) Paula Badosa | (Serbia) Teodora Kostović (Armenia) Alina Charaeva (Netherlands) Suzan Lamens (United States) Mary Stoiana |
| Sep 21 | Billie Jean King Cup Finals; Shenzhen, China; Hard (i) – 8 teams | Czech Republic; 2–0 | Ukraine | Italy; Spain | China; Belgium; Kazakhstan; Great Britain |
| Sep 21 | Singapore Open; Singapore, Singapore; WTA 500; Hard (i) – $1,206,446 – 28S/16Q/16D; Singles – Doubles | (Canada) Leylah Fernandez; 7–5, 6–0 | (Australia) Talia Gibson | (Poland) Maja Chwalińska; Tatiana Prozorova | Mirra Andreeva (Belgium) Elise Mertens (China) Wang Xinyu (Greece) Maria Sakkari |
| Sep 21 | Singapore Open; Singapore, Singapore; WTA 500; Hard (i) – $1,206,446 – 28S/16Q/16D; Singles – Doubles | (New Zealand) Erin Routliffe (Indonesia) Aldila Sutjiadi; 6–3, 6–2 | (China) Tang Qianhui (China) Xu Yifan | (Poland) Maja Chwalińska; Tatiana Prozorova | Mirra Andreeva (Belgium) Elise Mertens (China) Wang Xinyu (Greece) Maria Sakkari |
| Sep 21 | Korea Open; Seoul, South Korea; WTA 250; Hard – $283,347 – 32S/16Q/16D; Singles – Doubles | (Australia) Kimberly Birrell; 6–4, 6–2 | (Australia) Maya Joint | Alina Korneeva (Hungary) Anna Bondár | (Australia) Taylah Preston (Thailand) Lanlana Tararudee (Romania) Elena-Gabriela Ruse (United States) Katie Volynets |
| Sep 21 | Korea Open; Seoul, South Korea; WTA 250; Hard – $283,347 – 32S/16Q/16D; Singles – Doubles | (Chinese Taipei) Chan Hao-ching (Chinese Taipei) Wu Fang-hsien; 6–2, 6–3 | (Chinese Taipei) Lee Ya-hsin (China) Ye Qiuyu | Alina Korneeva (Hungary) Anna Bondár | (Australia) Taylah Preston (Thailand) Lanlana Tararudee (Romania) Elena-Gabriela Ruse (United States) Katie Volynets |
| Sep 28; Oct 5 | China Open; Beijing, China; WTA 1000; Hard – $9,415,725 – 96S/48Q/32D; Singles – Doubles | (China) Zheng Qinwen; 7–5, 6–4 | Mirra Andreeva | (Belgium) Elise Mertens (Czech Republic) Nikola Bartůňková | (Ukraine) Elina Svitolina (Poland) Iga Świątek; Ekaterina Alexandrova (Czech Republic) Karolína Muchová |
| Sep 28; Oct 5 | China Open; Beijing, China; WTA 1000; Hard – $9,415,725 – 96S/48Q/32D; Singles – Doubles | (Canada) Gabriela Dabrowski (Brazil) Luisa Stefani; 6–1, 6–2 | (Czech Republic) Kateřina Siniaková (China) Zhang Shuai | (Belgium) Elise Mertens (Czech Republic) Nikola Bartůňková | (Ukraine) Elina Svitolina (Poland) Iga Świątek; Ekaterina Alexandrova (Czech Republic) Karolína Muchová |

=== October ===
| Week | Tournament | Champions | Runners-up | Semifinalists | Quarterfinalists |
|---|---|---|---|---|---|
| Oct 12 | Wuhan Open; Wuhan, China; WTA 1000; Hard – $4,088,211 – 56S/24Q/28D; Singles – Doubles | (Poland) Maja Chwalińska; 2–6, 6–4, 6–2 | (United Kingdom) Sonay Kartal | (Poland) Iga Świątek (Latvia) Jeļena Ostapenko | (United States) Ann Li (Greece) Maria Sakkari (Ukraine) Elina Svitolina; Diana Shnaider |
| Oct 12 | Wuhan Open; Wuhan, China; WTA 1000; Hard – $4,088,211 – 56S/24Q/28D; Singles – Doubles | (Canada) Gabriela Dabrowski (Brazil) Luisa Stefani; 7–5, 6–4 | (Australia) Storm Hunter (Czech Republic) Kateřina Siniaková | (Poland) Iga Świątek (Latvia) Jeļena Ostapenko | (United States) Ann Li (Greece) Maria Sakkari (Ukraine) Elina Svitolina; Diana Shnaider |
| Oct 19 | Ningbo Open; Ningbo, China; WTA 500; Hard – $1,206,446 – 28S/24Q/16D; Singles – Doubles | (Kazakhstan) Elena Rybakina; 6–2, 6–2 | (Canada) Leylah Fernandez | Diana Shnaider (Czech Republic) Marie Bouzková | (Poland) Katarzyna Kawa (United States) Iva Jovic; Ekaterina Alexandrova (Czech Republic) Sára Bejlek |
| Oct 19 | Ningbo Open; Ningbo, China; WTA 500; Hard – $1,206,446 – 28S/24Q/16D; Singles – Doubles | (United States) Desirae Krawczyk (Hungary) Fanny Stollár; 7–6^{(7–5)}, 5–7, [10–6] | (Spain) Cristina Bucșa (United States) Nicole Melichar-Martínez | Diana Shnaider (Czech Republic) Marie Bouzková | (Poland) Katarzyna Kawa (United States) Iva Jovic; Ekaterina Alexandrova (Czech Republic) Sára Bejlek |
| Oct 19 | Japan Open; Osaka, Japan; WTA 250; Hard – $283,347 – 32S/24Q/16D; Singles – Doubles | (Czech Republic) Kateřina Siniaková; 6–1, 6–0 | (United States) Ashlyn Krueger | (United States) Ann Li (United Kingdom) Katie Boulter | (Austria) Lilli Tagger (Australia) Talia Gibson (Croatia) Antonia Ružić (United States) Mary Stoiana |
| Oct 19 | Japan Open; Osaka, Japan; WTA 250; Hard – $283,347 – 32S/24Q/16D; Singles – Doubles | (Australia) Storm Hunter (Indonesia) Janice Tjen; 6–4, 6–1 | (Czech Republic) Jesika Malečková (Czech Republic) Miriam Škoch | (United States) Ann Li (United Kingdom) Katie Boulter | (Austria) Lilli Tagger (Australia) Talia Gibson (Croatia) Antonia Ružić (United States) Mary Stoiana |
| Oct 26 | Pan Pacific Open; Tokyo, Japan; WTA 500; Hard – $1,206,446 – 28S/24Q/16D; Singles – Doubles | Diana Shnaider; 6–4, 5–7, 6–2 | (Canada) Leylah Fernandez | (Uzbekistan) Kamilla Rakhimova (Slovakia) Mia Pohánková | (Kazakhstan) Elena Rybakina (Australia) Maya Joint (Philippines) Alexandra Eala (United States) Alycia Parks |
| Oct 26 | Pan Pacific Open; Tokyo, Japan; WTA 500; Hard – $1,206,446 – 28S/24Q/16D; Singles – Doubles | (Italy) Sara Errani (Italy) Jasmine Paolini; 6–2, 6–2 | (Canada) Gabriela Dabrowski (Brazil) Luisa Stefani | (Uzbekistan) Kamilla Rakhimova (Slovakia) Mia Pohánková | (Kazakhstan) Elena Rybakina (Australia) Maya Joint (Philippines) Alexandra Eala (United States) Alycia Parks |
| Oct 26 | Guangzhou Open; Guangzhou, China; WTA 250; Hard – $283,347 – 32S/24Q/16D; Singles – Doubles | (United Kingdom) Harriet Dart; 4–6, 6–3, 6–4 | (Austria) Lilli Tagger | (Spain) Kaitlin Quevedo (China) Sun Xinran | (Switzerland) Jil Teichmann (China) Shi Han (United States) Claire Liu (Spain) Paula Badosa |
| Oct 26 | Guangzhou Open; Guangzhou, China; WTA 250; Hard – $283,347 – 32S/24Q/16D; Singles – Doubles | (Uzbekistan) Polina Kudermetova (Uzbekistan) Maria Timofeeva; 7–5, 7–6^{(7–1)} | (Chinese Taipei) Cho I-hsuan (Chinese Taipei) Cho Yi-tsen | (Spain) Kaitlin Quevedo (China) Sun Xinran | (Switzerland) Jil Teichmann (China) Shi Han (United States) Claire Liu (Spain) Paula Badosa |

=== November ===
| Week | Tournament | Champions | Runners-up | Semifinalists | Quarterfinalists |
|---|---|---|---|---|---|
| Nov 2 | Hong Kong Open; Hong Kong, China; WTA 250; Hard – $283,347 – 32S/24Q/16D; Singles – Doubles | (United States) Claire Liu; 6–3, 6–0 | (Philippines) Alexandra Eala | Alexandra Shubladze (Greece) Maria Sakkari | (Romania) Sorana Cîrstea (Turkey) Zeynep Sönmez; Aliaksandra Sasnovich (Croatia) Antonia Ružić |
| Nov 2 | Hong Kong Open; Hong Kong, China; WTA 250; Hard – $283,347 – 32S/24Q/16D; Singles – Doubles | (Chinese Taipei) Chan Hao-ching (Japan) Miyu Kato; 6–4, 6–4 | (Australia) Talia Gibson (Australia) Maddison Inglis | Alexandra Shubladze (Greece) Maria Sakkari | (Romania) Sorana Cîrstea (Turkey) Zeynep Sönmez; Aliaksandra Sasnovich (Croatia) Antonia Ružić |
| Nov 2 | Chennai Open; Chennai, India; WTA 250; Hard – $283,347 – 32S/16Q/16D; Singles – Doubles | (Poland) Magda Linette; 5–7, 6–1, 6–4 | (Indonesia) Janice Tjen | (United States) Robin Montgomery; Anastasia Zakharova | (Uzbekistan) Polina Kudermetova (India) Maaya Rajeshwaran Revathi (Japan) Mai Hontama (Italy) Lucrezia Stefanini |
| Nov 2 | Chennai Open; Chennai, India; WTA 250; Hard – $283,347 – 32S/16Q/16D; Singles – Doubles | (Switzerland) Naïma Karamoko (Switzerland) Simona Waltert; 6–2, 6–0 | (India) Vaishnavi Adkar (India) Rutuja Bhosale | (United States) Robin Montgomery; Anastasia Zakharova | (Uzbekistan) Polina Kudermetova (India) Maaya Rajeshwaran Revathi (Japan) Mai Hontama (Italy) Lucrezia Stefanini |
| Nov 9 | WTA Finals; Indian Wells, United States; Year-end championships Hard – $10,000,000 – 8S/8D; Singles – Doubles | Mirra Andreeva; 7–5, 6–3 | (Ukraine) Elina Svitolina | (Czech Republic) Linda Nosková (United States) Jessica Pegula | Round robin (United States) Coco Gauff (Ukraine) Marta Kostyuk; Aryna Sabalenka; Diana Shnaider (Czech Republic) Karolína Muchová |
| Nov 9 | WTA Finals; Indian Wells, United States; Year-end championships Hard – $10,000,000 – 8S/8D; Singles – Doubles | (Czech Republic) Kateřina Siniaková (United States) Taylor Townsend; 6–4, 6–3 | (Italy) Sara Errani (Italy) Jasmine Paolini | (Czech Republic) Linda Nosková (United States) Jessica Pegula | Round robin (United States) Coco Gauff (Ukraine) Marta Kostyuk; Aryna Sabalenka; Diana Shnaider (Czech Republic) Karolína Muchová |
| Nov 16 | Billie Jean King Cup play-offs | Play-off winners United States; Brazil; Poland; Japan; Australia; Thailand; Slovenia | Play-off losers Hungary; Canada; Sweden; Argentina; France; Switzerland; Indonesia | | |

== Statistical information ==
These tables present the number of singles (S), doubles (D), and mixed doubles (X) titles won by each player and each nation during the season, within all the tournament categories of the 2025 WTA Tour: the Grand Slam tournaments, the year-end championships (the WTA Finals), the WTA Premier tournaments (WTA 1000 and WTA 500), and the WTA 250. The players/nations are sorted by:

1. total number of titles (a doubles title won by two players representing the same nation counts as only one win for the nation);
2. cumulated point value of those titles (one Grand Slam tournament win equaling two WTA 1000 wins, one year-end championships win equaling one-and-a-half WTA 1000 win, one WTA 1000 win equaling two WTA 500 wins, one WTA 500 win equaling two WTA 250 wins);
3. a singles > doubles > mixed doubles hierarchy;
4. alphabetical order (by family names for players).

=== Key ===
Grand Slam
WTA Finals
WTA 1000
WTA 500
WTA 250

=== Titles won by player ===
| Total | Player | Grand Slam | | | Year-end | | WTA 1000 | | | WTA 500 | | WTA 250 | | Total | | |
| Total | Player | S | D | X | S | D | S | D | X | S | D | S | D | S | D | X |
|---|---|---|---|---|---|---|---|---|---|---|---|---|---|---|---|---|
| 9 | Kateřina Siniaková (CZE) | | ● ● | | | ● | | ● ● ● ● | | | ● | ● | | 1 | 8 | 0 |
| 7 | Taylor Townsend (USA) | | ● ● | | | ● | | ● ● ● | | | | | ● | 0 | 7 | 0 |
| 6 | Gabriela Dabrowski (CAN) | | | | | | | ● ● ● | | | ● | | ● ● | 0 | 6 | 0 |
| 6 | Luisa Stefani (BRA) | | | | | | | ● ● ● | | | ● | | ● ● | 0 | 6 | 0 |
| 5 | Mirra Andreeva (Note: As of 1 March 2022, the WTA announced that players from Russia and Belarus will not compete in tournaments under the name or flag of Russia or Belarus due to the Russian invasion of Ukraine.) | ● | | | ● | | | ● | | ● ● | | | | 4 | 1 | 0 |
| 4 | Elena Rybakina (KAZ) | ● ● | | | | | | | | ● ● | | | | 4 | 0 | 0 |
| 4 | Linda Nosková (CZE) | ● | | | | | | ● | | ● | ● | | | 2 | 2 | 0 |
| 4 | Zhang Shuai (CHN) | | ● | | | | | ● | | | ● ● | | | 0 | 4 | 0 |
| 3 | Karolína Muchová (CZE) | | | ● | | | ● | | | ● | | | | 2 | 0 | 1 |
| 3 | Aryna Sabalenka | | | | | | ● ● | | | ● | | | | 3 | 0 | 0 |
| 3 | Marie Bouzková (CZE) | | | | | | | ● | | | | ● ● | | 2 | 1 | 0 |
| 3 | Cristina Bucșa (ESP) | | | | | | | | | ● | ● ● | | | 1 | 2 | 0 |
| 3 | Aldila Sutjiadi (INA) | | | | | | | | | | ● ● ● | | | 0 | 3 | 0 |
| 3 | Harriet Dart (GBR) | | | | | | | | | | | ● | ● ● | 1 | 2 | 0 |
| 3 | Chan Hao-ching (TPE) | | | | | | | | | | | | ● ● ● | 0 | 2 | 0 |
| 3 | Maia Lumsden (GBR) | | | | | | | | | | | | ● ● ● | 0 | 3 | 0 |
| 2 | Sara Errani (ITA) | | | ● | | | | | | | ● | | | 0 | 1 | 1 |
| 2 | Jeļena Ostapenko (LAT) | | | ● | | | | | | | ● | | | 0 | 1 | 1 |
| 2 | Guo Hanyu (CHN) | | ● | | | | | | | | | | ● | 0 | 2 | 0 |
| 2 | Kristina Mladenovic (FRA) | | ● | | | | | | | | | | ● | 0 | 2 | 0 |
| 2 | Jessica Pegula (USA) | | | | | | ● | | | ● | | | | 2 | 0 | 0 |
| 2 | Diana Shnaider | | | | | | | ● | | ● | | | | 1 | 1 | 0 |
| 2 | Marta Kostyuk (UKR) | | | | | | ● | | | | | ● | | 2 | 0 | 0 |
| 2 | Elina Svitolina (UKR) | | | | | | ● | | | | | ● | | 2 | 0 | 0 |
| 2 | Ekaterina Alexandrova | | | | | | | | | | ● ● | | | 0 | 2 | 0 |
| 2 | Maya Joint (AUS) | | | | | | | | | | ● ● | | | 0 | 2 | 0 |
| 2 | Desirae Krawczyk (USA) | | | | | | | | | | ● ● | | | 0 | 2 | 0 |
| 2 | Nicole Melichar-Martinez (USA) | | | | | | | | | | ● ● | | | 0 | 2 | 0 |
| 2 | Erin Routliffe (NZL) | | | | | | | | | | ● ● | | | 0 | 2 | 0 |
| 2 | Sorana Cîrstea (ROU) | | | | | | | | | | ● | ● | | 1 | 1 | 0 |
| 2 | Anastasia Dețiuc (CZE) | | | | | | | | | | | | ● ● | 0 | 2 | 0 |
| 2 | Storm Hunter (AUS) | | | | | | | | | | | | ● ● | 0 | 2 | 0 |
| 2 | Miyu Kato (JPN) | | | | | | | | | | | | ● ● | 0 | 1 | 0 |
| 2 | Irina Khromacheva | | | | | | | | | | | | ● ● | 0 | 2 | 0 |
| 2 | Janice Tjen (INA) | | | | | | | | | | | | ● ● | 0 | 2 | 0 |
| 1 | Elise Mertens (BEL) | | ● | | | | | | | | | | | 0 | 1 | 0 |
| 1 | Olivia Gadecki (AUS) | | | ● | | | | | | | | | | 0 | 0 | 1 |
| 1 | Maja Chwalińska (POL) | | | | | | ● | | | | | | | 1 | 0 | 0 |
| 1 | Coco Gauff (USA) | | | | | | ● | | | | | | | 1 | 0 | 0 |
| 1 | Iga Świątek (POL) | | | | | | ● | | | | | | | 1 | 0 | 0 |
| 1 | Zheng Qinwen (CHN) | | | | | | ● | | | | | | | 1 | 0 | 0 |
| 1 | Anna Danilina (KAZ) | | | | | | | ● | | | | | | 0 | 1 | 0 |
| 1 | Aleksandra Krunić (SRB) | | | | | | | ● | | | | | | 0 | 1 | 0 |
| 1 | Belinda Bencic (SUI) | | | | | | | | ● | | | | | 0 | 0 | 1 |
| 1 | Sára Bejlek (CZE) | | | | | | | | | ● | | | | 1 | 0 | 0 |
| 1 | Alexandra Eala (PHI) | | | | | | | | | ● | | | | 1 | 0 | 0 |
| 1 | Leylah Fernandez (CAN) | | | | | | | | | ● | | | | 1 | 0 | 0 |
| 1 | Iva Jovic (USA) | | | | | | | | | ● | | | | 1 | 0 | 0 |
| 1 | Emma Navarro (USA) | | | | | | | | | ● | | | | 1 | 0 | 0 |
| 1 | Diane Parry (FRA) | | | | | | | | | ● | | | | 1 | 0 | 0 |
| 1 | Donna Vekić (CRO) | | | | | | | | | ● | | | | 1 | 0 | 0 |
| 1 | Hsieh Su-wei (TPE) | | | | | | | | | | ● | | | 0 | 1 | 0 |
| 1 | Jiang Xinyu (CHN) | | | | | | | | | | ● | | | 0 | 1 | 0 |
| 1 | Caty McNally (USA) | | | | | | | | | | ● | | | 0 | 1 | 0 |
| 1 | Tereza Mihalíková (SVK) | | | | | | | | | | ● | | | 0 | 1 | 0 |
| 1 | Olivia Nicholls (GBR) | | | | | | | | | | ● | | | 0 | 1 | 0 |
| 1 | Jasmine Paolini (ITA) | | | | | | | | | | ● | | | 0 | 1 | 0 |
| 1 | Liudmila Samsonova | | | | | | | | | | ● | | | 0 | 1 | 0 |
| 1 | Fanny Stollár (HUN) | | | | | | | | | | ● | | | 0 | 1 | 0 |
| 1 | Xu Yifan (CHN) | | | | | | | | | | ● | | | 0 | 1 | 0 |
| 1 | Vera Zvonareva | | | | | | | | | | ● | | | 0 | 1 | 0 |
| 1 | Kimberly Birrell (AUS) | | | | | | | | | | | ● | | 1 | 0 | 0 |
| 1 | Katie Boulter (GBR) | | | | | | | | | | | ● | | 1 | 0 | 0 |
| 1 | Elisabetta Cocciaretto (ITA) | | | | | | | | | | | ● | | 1 | 0 | 0 |
| 1 | Madison Keys (USA) | | | | | | | | | | | ● | | 1 | 0 | 0 |
| 1 | Tamara Korpatsch (GER) | | | | | | | | | | | ● | | 1 | 0 | 0 |
| 1 | Barbora Krejčíková (CZE) | | | | | | | | | | | ● | | 1 | 0 | 0 |
| 1 | Magda Linette (POL) | | | | | | | | | | | ● | | 1 | 0 | 0 |
| 1 | Claire Liu (USA) | | | | | | | | | | | ● | | 1 | 0 | 0 |
| 1 | Kristina Liutova | | | | | | | | | | | ● | | 1 | 0 | 0 |
| 1 | Petra Marčinko (CRO) | | | | | | | | | | | ● | | 1 | 0 | 0 |
| 1 | Robin Montgomery (USA) | | | | | | | | | | | ● | | 1 | 0 | 0 |
| 1 | Kaitlin Quevedo (ESP) | | | | | | | | | | | ● | | 1 | 0 | 0 |
| 1 | Mayar Sherif (EGY) | | | | | | | | | | | ● | | 1 | 0 | 0 |
| 1 | Peyton Stearns (USA) | | | | | | | | | | | ● | | 1 | 0 | 0 |
| 1 | Lilli Tagger (AUT) | | | | | | | | | | | ● | | 1 | 0 | 0 |
| 1 | Shuko Aoyama (JPN) | | | | | | | | | | | | ● | 0 | 1 | 0 |
| 1 | Eudice Chong (HKG) | | | | | | | | | | | | ● | 0 | 1 | 0 |
| 1 | Caroline Dolehide (USA) | | | | | | | | | | | | ● | 0 | 1 | 0 |
| 1 | Dalila Jakupović (SLO) | | | | | | | | | | | | ● | 0 | 1 | 0 |
| 1 | Naïma Karamoko (SUI) | | | | | | | | | | | | ● | 0 | 1 | 0 |
| 1 | Magali Kempen (BEL) | | | | | | | | | | | | ● | 0 | 1 | 0 |
| 1 | Maria Kozyreva | | | | | | | | | | | | ● | 0 | 1 | 0 |
| 1 | Polina Kudermetova (UZB) | | | | | | | | | | | | ● | 0 | 1 | 0 |
| 1 | Liang En-shuo (TPE) | | | | | | | | | | | | ● | 0 | 1 | 0 |
| 1 | Jesika Malečková (CZE) | | | | | | | | | | | | ● | 0 | 1 | 0 |
| 1 | Katarzyna Piter (POL) | | | | | | | | | | | | ● | 0 | 1 | 0 |
| 1 | Nika Radišić (SLO) | | | | | | | | | | | | ● | 0 | 1 | 0 |
| 1 | Kamilla Rakhimova (UZB) | | | | | | | | | | | | ● | 0 | 1 | 0 |
| 1 | Sabrina Santamaria (USA) | | | | | | | | | | | | ● | 0 | 1 | 0 |
| 1 | Miriam Škoch (CZE) | | | | | | | | | | | | ● | 0 | 1 | 0 |
| 1 | Sara Sorribes Tormo (ESP) | | | | | | | | | | | | ● | 0 | 1 | 0 |
| 1 | Maria Timofeeva (UZB) | | | | | | | | | | | | ● | 0 | 1 | 0 |
| 1 | Simona Waltert (SUI) | | | | | | | | | | | | ● | 0 | 1 | 0 |
| 1 | Wu Fang-hsien (TPE) | | | | | | | | | | | | ● | 0 | 1 | 0 |

=== Titles won by nation ===
| Total | Nation | Grand Slam | | | Year-end | | WTA 1000 | | | WTA 500 | | WTA 250 | | Total | | |
| Total | Nation | S | D | X | S | D | S | D | X | S | D | S | D | S | D | X |
|---|---|---|---|---|---|---|---|---|---|---|---|---|---|---|---|---|
| 23 | Czech Republic (CZE) | 1 | 2 | 1 | | 1 | 1 | 5 | | 3 | 2 | 4 | 3 | 9 | 13 | 1 |
| 22 | United States (USA) | | 2 | | | 1 | 2 | 3 | | 3 | 4 | 4 | 3 | 9 | 13 | 0 |
| 9 | China (CHN) | | 2 | | | | 1 | 1 | | | 4 | | 1 | 1 | 8 | 0 |
| 7 | Canada (CAN) | | | | | | | 3 | | 1 | 1 | | 2 | 1 | 6 | 0 |
| 6 | Brazil (BRA) | | | | | | | 3 | | | 1 | | 2 | 0 | 6 | 0 |
| 6 | Australia (AUS) | | | 1 | | | | | | | 2 | 1 | 2 | 1 | 4 | 1 |
| 6 | Great Britain (GBR) | | | | | | | | | | 1 | 2 | 3 | 2 | 4 | 0 |
| 5 | Kazakhstan (KAZ) | 2 | | | | | | 1 | | 2 | | | | 4 | 1 | 0 |
| 5 | Spain (ESP) | | | | | | | | | 1 | 2 | 1 | 1 | 2 | 3 | 0 |
| 5 | Indonesia (INA) | | | | | | | | | | 3 | | 2 | 0 | 5 | 0 |
| 5 | Chinese Taipei (TPE) | | | | | | | | | | 1 | | 4 | 0 | 5 | 0 |
| 4 | Ukraine (UKR) | | | | | | 2 | | | | | 2 | | 4 | 0 | 0 |
| 4 | Poland (POL) | | | | | | 2 | | | | | 1 | 1 | 3 | 1 | 0 |
| 3 | France (FRA) | | 1 | | | | | | | 1 | | | 1 | 1 | 2 | 0 |
| 3 | Italy (ITA) | | | 1 | | | | | | | 1 | 1 | | 1 | 1 | 1 |
| 3 | Japan (JPN) | | | | | | | | | | | | 3 | 0 | 3 | 0 |
| 2 | Latvia (LAT) | | | 1 | | | | | | | 1 | | | 0 | 1 | 1 |
| 2 | Belgium (BEL) | | 1 | | | | | | | | | | 1 | 0 | 2 | 0 |
| 2 | Switzerland (SUI) | | | | | | | | 1 | | | | 1 | 0 | 1 | 1 |
| 2 | New Zealand (NZL) | | | | | | | | | | 2 | | | 0 | 2 | 0 |
| 2 | Croatia (CRO) | | | | | | | | | 1 | | 1 | | 2 | 0 | 0 |
| 2 | Romania (ROU) | | | | | | | | | | 1 | 1 | | 1 | 1 | 0 |
| 2 | Uzbekistan (UZB) | | | | | | | | | | | | 2 | 0 | 2 | 0 |
| 1 | Serbia (SRB) | | | | | | | 1 | | | | | | 0 | 1 | 0 |
| 1 | Philippines (PHI) | | | | | | | | | 1 | | | | 1 | 0 | 0 |
| 1 | Hungary (HUN) | | | | | | | | | | 1 | | | 0 | 1 | 0 |
| 1 | Slovakia (SVK) | | | | | | | | | | 1 | | | 0 | 1 | 0 |
| 1 | Austria (AUT) | | | | | | | | | | | 1 | | 1 | 0 | 0 |
| 1 | Egypt (EGY) | | | | | | | | | | | 1 | | 1 | 0 | 0 |
| 1 | Germany (GER) | | | | | | | | | | | 1 | | 1 | 0 | 0 |
| 1 | Hong Kong (HKG) | | | | | | | | | | | | 1 | 0 | 1 | 0 |
| 1 | Slovenia (SLO) | | | | | | | | | | | | 1 | 0 | 1 | 0 |

=== Titles information ===
The following players won their first main circuit title in singles, doubles, or mixed doubles:

Singles

- (Czech Republic) Sára Bejlek (20 years, 7 days) – Abu Dhabi (draw)
- (Spain) Cristina Bucșa (28 years, 59 days) – Mérida (draw)
- (Croatia) Petra Marčinko (20 years, 170 days) – Rabat (draw)
- (United States) Robin Montgomery (21 years, 282 days) – 's-Hertogenbosch (draw) (Note: the final was not played, after her opponent withdrew)
- (Austria) Lilli Tagger (18 years, 159 days) – Prague (draw)
- Kristina Liutova (16 years, 181 days) – Memphis (draw)
- (Philippines) Alexandra Eala (21 years, 72 days) – Washington DC (draw)
- (France) Diane Parry (23 years, 361 days) – Monterrey (draw)
- (Spain) Kaitlin Quevedo (20 years, 220 days) – São Paulo (draw)
- (Australia) Kimberly Birrell (28 years, 151 days) – Seoul (draw)
- (Poland) Maja Chwalińska (25 years, 7 days) – Wuhan (draw)
- (United Kingdom) Harriet Dart (30 years, 96 days) – Guangzhou (draw)
- (United States) Claire Liu (26 years, 167 days) – Hong Kong (draw)

Doubles

- (Czech Republic) Jesika Malečková (29 years, 246 days) – Rouen (draw)
- (Hong Kong) Eudice Chong (30 years, 30 days) – Rabat (draw)
- (Chinese Taipei) Liang En-shuo (25 years, 254 days) – 's-Hertogenbosch (draw)
- (United Kingdom) Harriet Dart (29 years, 328 days) – Nottingham (draw)
- (United Kingdom) Maia Lumsden (28 years, 162 days) – Nottingham (draw)
- (Czech Republic) Linda Nosková (21 years, 217 days) – Berlin (draw)
- (Slovenia) Nika Radišić (26 years, 129 days) – Hamburg (draw)
- Maria Kozyreva (27 years, 70 days) – Memphis (draw)
- (Uzbekistan) Polina Kudermetova (23 years, 150 days) – Guangzhou (draw)
- (Uzbekistan) Maria Timofeeva (22 years, 348 days) – Guangzhou (draw)
- (Switzerland) Naïma Karamoko (29 years, 39 days) – Chennai (draw)

Mixed

- (Switzerland) Belinda Bencic (29 years, 4 days) – Indian Wells (draw)
- (Latvia) Jeļena Ostapenko (29 years, 31 days) – **Wimbledon** (draw)
- (Czech Republic) Karolína Muchová (30 years, 5 days) – **US Open** (draw)

The following players defended a main circuit title in singles, doubles, or mixed doubles:

Singles

- Aryna Sabalenka – Brisbane (draw), Miami (draw)
- (United States) Jessica Pegula – Charleston (draw)
- (United States) Iva Jovic – Guadalajara (draw)
- (Kazakhstan) Elena Rybakina – Ningbo (draw)

Doubles

- (Brazil) Luisa Stefani – Strasbourg (draw), São Paulo (draw)
- (United States) Nicole Melichar-Martinez – Guadalajara (draw)

Mixed

- (Australia) Olivia Gadecki – **Australian Open** (draw)
- (Italy) Sara Errani – **French Open** (draw)

=== Best ranking ===
The following players achieved their career-high ranking in this season inside top 50 (players who made their top 10 highest rank indicated in bold): (Note: Name and ranking in bold means the player entered the top 10 or became world No. 1 for the first time this year, and only the ranking in bold means the player had entered the top 10 in a previous season (before 2026) but reached a new career-high ranking this year.)

Singles

- (United States) Amanda Anisimova (reached place **No. 3** on January 5)
- (Germany) Eva Lys (reached place No. 39 on January 5)
- (France) Loïs Boisson (reached place No. 34 on February 2)
- (Australia) Maya Joint (reached place No. 28 on February 16)
- (China) Wang Xinyu (reached place No. 30 on February 23)
- (Canada) **Victoria Mboko** (reached place **No. 9** on March 16)
- (Spain) Cristina Bucșa (reached place No. 30 on March 16)
- (United States) Hailey Baptiste (reached place No. 25 on May 4)
- (Romania) Jaqueline Cristian (reached place No. 28 on May 4)
- (Czech Republic) Tereza Valentová (reached place No. 42 on May 25)
- (United States) Caty McNally (reached place No. 50 on June 22)
- (Czech Republic) Karolína Muchová (reached place **No. 6** on July 13)
- (Czech Republic) Marie Bouzková (reached place No. 21 on July 13)
- (Croatia) Petra Marčinko (reached place No. 45 on July 13)
- (Turkey) Zeynep Sönmez (reached place No. 48 on July 13)
- (Croatia) Antonia Ruzic (reached place No. 50 on July 13)
- (Austria) Lilli Tagger (reached place No. 45 on July 27)
- (Germany) Tamara Korpatsch (reached place No 46 on July 27)
- (Czech Republic) **Linda Nosková** (reached place **No. 6** on August 24)
- (Indonesia) Janice Tjen (reached place No. 35 on August 24)
- (Kazakhstan) **Elena Rybakina** (reached place **No. 1** on September 14)
- (Ukraine) **Marta Kostyuk** (reached place **No. 10** on September 14)
- (Romania) Sorana Cîrstea (reached place No. 15 on September 14)
- (Czech Republic) Sára Bejlek (reached place No. 28 on September 14)
- (France) Diane Parry (reached place No. 30 on September 14)
- (Ukraine) Oleksandra Oliynykova (reached place No. 41 on September 14)
- (Ukraine) Yuliia Starodubtseva (reached place No. 42 on September 21)
- (United States) Iva Jovic (reached place No. 11 on October 12)
- (Czech Republic) Nikola Bartůňková (reached place No. 29 on October 12)
- (Australia) Kimberly Birrell (reached place No. 40 on October 12)
- (Poland) Maja Chwalińska (reached place No. 11 on October 19)
- (United States) Ann Li (reached place No. 25 on October 19)
- (Ukraine) Daria Snigur (reached place No. 40 on October 19)
- (Australia) Talia Gibson (reached place No. 36 on November 2)
- (Uzbekistan) Kamilla Rakhimova (reached place No. 44 on November 2)
- (Philippines) Alexandra Eala (reached place No. 15 on November 9)
- Mirra Andreeva (reached place **No. 2** on November 16)

Doubles

- (United States) Peyton Stearns (reached place No. 46 on February 2)
- (United Kingdom) Olivia Nicholls (reached place No. 21 on February 16)
- (Slovakia) Tereza Mihalíková (reached place No. 21 on February 16)
- (Canada) Gabriela Dabrowski (reached place **No. 2** on February 23)
- Ekaterina Alexandrova (reached place No. 36 on March 2)
- (Kazakhstan) Anna Danilina (reached place **No. 4** on March 16)
- Liudmila Samsonova (reached place No. 32 on April 20)
- (Czech Republic) Jesika Malečková (reached place No. 47 on April 20)
- (Serbia) **Aleksandra Krunić** (reached place **No. 4** on May 18)
- (China) **Guo Hanyu** (reached place **No. 9** on July 13)
- (Czech Republic) Linda Nosková (reached place No. 36 on August 24)
- (Brazil) Luisa Stefani (reached place **No. 3** on September 14)
- (Chinese Taipei) Liang En-shuo (reached place No. 20 on September 14)
- (China) Jiang Xinyu (reached place No. 21 on September 14)
- (Australia) Maya Joint (reached place No. 26 on September 14)
- (Indonesia) Aldila Sutjiadi (reached place No. 16 on October 12)
- (Belgium) Magali Kempen (reached place No. 32 on October 12)
- (United States) Quinn Gleason (reached place No. 33 on October 12)
- (United Kingdom) Maia Lumsden (reached place No. 34 on October 12)
- (China) Tang Qianhui (reached place No. 48 on October 12)
- (Indonesia) Janice Tjen (reached place No. 38 on October 19)
- (Poland) Katarzyna Piter (reached place No. 45 on October 19)
- Maria Kozyreva (reached place No. 47 on October 19)
- (Spain) Cristina Bucșa (reached place No. 11 on November 2)

== Statistics leaders ==
as of October 26, 2026

- Players having played at least 20 matches are included

Aces
| | Player | Aces | Matches | Ace per match |
|---|---|---|---|---|
| 1 | (Kazakhstan) Elena Rybakina | 432 | 67 | 6.45 |
| 2 | (Czech Republic) Linda Nosková | 347 | 50 | 6.94 |
| 3 | (United States) Ann Li | 305 | 57 | 5.35 |
| 4 | (China) Zheng Qinwen | 303 | 35 | 8.66 |
| 5 | Aryna Sabalenka | 298 | 58 | 5.14 |
| 6 | (United States) Jessica Pegula | 272 | 64 | 4.29 |
| 7 | (United States) Alycia Parks | 255 | 43 | 5.93 |
| 8 | (Denmark) Clara Tauson | 252 | 39 | 6.30 |
| 9 | (Japan) Naomi Osaka | 250 | 42 | 6.08 |
| 10 | (Belgium) Elise Mertens | 236 | 55 | 4.29 |

Double faults
| | Player | DFs | Matches |
|---|---|---|---|
| 1 | (United States) Coco Gauff | 351 | 62 |
| 2 | (Latvia) Jeļena Ostapenko | 315 | 49 |
| 3 | (United States) Alycia Parks | 286 | 43 |
| 4 | (Spain) Paula Badosa | 271 | 39 |
| 5 | (Canada) Leylah Fernandez | 255 | 53 |
| 6 | (Czech Republic) Linda Nosková | 254 | 50 |
| 7 | (United Kingdom) Katie Boulter | 237 | 42 |
| 8 | Liudmila Samsonova | 233 | 46 |
| 9 | Mirra Andreeva | 229 | 66 |
| 10 | (Belgium) Elise Mertens | 227 | 55 |

First-serve percentage
| | Player | % | Matches |
|---|---|---|---|
| 1 | (United States) Katie Volynets | 74.3 | 32 |
| 2 | (Germany) Laura Siegemund | 74.2 | 20 |
| 3 | (Mexico) Renata Zarazúa | 73.9 | 27 |
| 4 | (Ukraine) Oleksandra Oliynykova | 71.8 | 34 |
| 5 | (Poland) Maja Chwalińska | 71.4 | 27 |
| 6 | (United States) Caty McNally | 70.5 | 46 |
| 7 | (Ukraine) Daria Snigur | 70.5 | 30 |
| 8 | (Kazakhstan) Yulia Putintseva | 69.8 | 33 |
| 9 | (Colombia) Emiliana Arango | 69.2 | 26 |
| 10 | (Switzerland) Viktorija Golubic | 68.9 | 29 |

First-serve points won
| | Player | % | Matches |
|---|---|---|---|
| 1 | (China) Zheng Qinwen | 74.8 | 35 |
| 2 | (Kazakhstan) Elena Rybakina | 74.0 | 67 |
| 3 | (Czech Republic) Linda Nosková | 73.0 | 50 |
| 4 | (Japan) Naomi Osaka | 71.8 | 42 |
| 5 | (Ukraine) Marta Kostyuk | 70.8 | 47 |
| 6 | Aryna Sabalenka | 70.7 | 58 |
| 7 | (United States) Madison Keys | 70.6 | 45 |
| 8 | (Czech Republic) Barbora Krejčíková | 70.4 | 31 |
| 8 | (Belgium) Elise Mertens | 70.2 | 55 |
| 10 | (United States) Jessica Pegula | 69.8 | 64 |

Second-serve points won
| | Player | % | Matches |
|---|---|---|---|
| 1 | Aryna Sabalenka | 53.9 | 58 |
| 2 | (United Kingdom) Sonay Kartal | 51.8 | 21 |
| 3 | (United States) Hailey Baptiste | 51.3 | 29 |
| 4 | (Kazakhstan) Elena Rybakina | 51.2 | 67 |
| 5 | (Ukraine) Yuliia Starodubtseva | 50.7 | 34 |
| 6 | (Czech Republic) Karolína Muchová | 50.7 | 53 |
| 7 | (Poland) Iga Świątek | 50.3 | 58 |
| 8 | (Poland) Maja Chwalińska | 50.3 | 27 |
| 9 | (Greece) Maria Sakkari | 50.2 | 47 |
| 10 | (United States) Jessica Pegula | 49.8 | 64 |

Service points won
| | Player | % | Matches |
|---|---|---|---|
| 1 | Aryna Sabalenka | 64.6 | 58 |
| 2 | (Kazakhstan) Elena Rybakina | 64.3 | 67 |
| 3 | (Czech Republic) Linda Nosková | 63.0 | 50 |
| 4 | (China) Zheng Qinwen | 62.9 | 35 |
| 5 | (Czech Republic) Karolína Muchová | 62.8 | 53 |
| 6 | (Japan) Naomi Osaka | 62.6 | 42 |
| 7 | (United States) Jessica Pegula | 62.2 | 64 |
| 8 | (United States) Madison Keys | 62.1 | 45 |
| 9 | (Czech Republic) Barbora Krejčíková | 61.4 | 31 |
| 10 | (United States) Taylor Townsend | 61.2 | 26 |

Return points won
| | Player | % | Matches |
|---|---|---|---|
| 1 | (Poland) Iga Świątek | 48.3 | 58 |
| 2 | Mirra Andreeva | 47.3 | 66 |
| 3 | (United States) Coco Gauff | 47.3 | 62 |
| 4 | (Ukraine) Elina Svitolina | 46.8 | 63 |
| 5 | (Ukraine) Marta Kostyuk | 46.7 | 47 |
| 6 | (United States) Amanda Anisimova | 46.1 | 34 |
| 7 | (United Kingdom) Emma Raducanu | 46.0 | 22 |
| 8 | (United States) Iva Jovic | 46.0 | 62 |
| 9 | (Poland) Maja Chwalińska | 45.8 | 27 |
| 10 | (Ukraine) Anhelina Kalinina | 45.7 | 26 |

Service games won
| | Player | % | Matches |
|---|---|---|---|
| 1 | (Kazakhstan) Elena Rybakina | 82.4 | 67 |
| 2 | Aryna Sabalenka | 81.5 | 58 |
| 3 | (Czech Republic) Linda Nosková | 80.3 | 50 |
| 4 | (United States) Madison Keys | 78.3 | 45 |
| 5 | (Czech Republic) Karolína Muchová | 77.4 | 53 |
| 6 | (Japan) Naomi Osaka | 77.4 | 42 |
| 7 | (China) Zheng Qinwen | 77.4 | 35 |
| 8 | (Czech Republic) Barbora Krejčíková | 76.2 | 31 |
| 9 | (United States) Jessica Pegula | 76.0 | 64 |
| 10 | Mirra Andreeva | 74.9 | 66 |

Return games won
| | Player | % | Matches |
|---|---|---|---|
| 1 | (Poland) Iga Świątek | 46.5 | 58 |
| 2 | Mirra Andreeva | 43.5 | 66 |
| 3 | (United States) Coco Gauff | 43.3 | 62 |
| 4 | (Ukraine) Marta Kostyuk | 42.9 | 47 |
| 5 | (Ukraine) Elina Svitolina | 42.6 | 63 |
| 6 | (Poland) Maja Chwalińska | 42.3 | 27 |
| 7 | (United Kingdom) Emma Raducanu | 41.5 | 22 |
| 8 | (United States) Iva Jovic | 40.9 | 62 |
| 9 | (United States) Amanda Anisimova | 40.8 | 34 |
| 10 | (Switzerland) Viktorija Golubic | 40.3 | 29 |

Break points saved
| | Player | % | Matches |
|---|---|---|---|
| 1 | (Kazakhstan) Elena Rybakina | 65.0 | 67 |
| 2 | Aryna Sabalenka | 64.2 | 58 |
| 3 | (Czech Republic) Linda Nosková | 64.1 | 50 |
| 4 | (Canada) Leylah Fernandez | 62.9 | 53 |
| 5 | (United States) Madison Keys | 62.8 | 45 |
| 6 | (Ukraine) Elina Svitolina | 62.6 | 63 |
| 7 | (United States) Taylor Townsend | 62.2 | 26 |
| 8 | (Czech Republic) Barbora Krejčíková | 61.8 | 31 |
| 9 | (Czech Republic) Karolína Muchová | 61.4 | 53 |
| 10 | (Czech Republic) Kateřina Siniaková | 61.0 | 38 |

Break points converted
| | Player | % | Matches |
|---|---|---|---|
| 1 | (Poland) Maja Chwalińska | 53.1 | 27 |
| 2 | (United Kingdom) Emma Raducanu | 52.5 | 22 |
| 3 | (Australia) Ajla Tomljanović | 51.9 | 26 |
| 4 | (Ukraine) Elina Svitolina | 50.4 | 63 |
| 5 | (Australia) Kimberly Birrell | 50.3 | 38 |
| 6 | (United States) Amanda Anisimova | 50.3 | 34 |
| 7 | (Uzbekistan) Kamilla Rakhimova | 50.2 | 33 |
| 8 | (United States) Iva Jovic | 50.1 | 62 |
| 9 | (Poland) Iga Świątek | 50.0 | 58 |
| 10 | (Colombia) Camila Osorio | 50.0 | 35 |

== WTA rankings ==
=== Singles ===
Final Singles Race rankings
| No. | Player | Points | Tourn |
|---|---|---|---|
| 1 | Elena Rybakina (KAZ) | 8,099 | 20 |
| 2 | Aryna Sabalenka | 6,485 | 20 |
| 3 | **Mirra Andreeva** | 6,306 | 20 |
| 4 | Coco Gauff (USA) | 5,763 | 20 |
| 5 | Jessica Pegula (USA) | 5,760 | 20 |
| 6 | Elina Svitolina (UKR) | 5,121 | 20 |
| 7 | Karolína Muchová (CZE) | 4,665 | 20 |
| 8 | Linda Nosková (CZE) | 4,343 | 20 |
| 9 | Iga Świątek (POL) | 4,188 | 19 |
| 10 | Marta Kostyuk (UKR) | 3,910 | 20 |
| 11 | Diana Shnaider | 3,238 | 23 |
| 12 | Iva Jovic (USA) | 2,941 | 22 |
| 13 | Maja Chwalińska (POL) | 2,755 | 13 |
| 14 | Elise Mertens (BEL) | 2,540 | 23 |
| 15 | Sorana Cîrstea (ROU) | 2,386 | 22 |
| 16 | Naomi Osaka (JPN) | 2,315 | 20 |
| 17 | Alexandra Eala (PHI) | 2,224 | 26 |
| 18 | Leylah Fernandez (CAN) | 2,201 | 27 |
| 19 | Belinda Bencic (SUI) | 2,168 | 18 |
| 20 | Victoria Mboko (CAN) | 2,143 | 14 |

WTA Singles Year-End Rankings
| # | Player | Points | #Trn | '25 Rk | High | Low | '25→'26 |
|---|---|---|---|---|---|---|---|
| 1 | Elena Rybakina (KAZ) | 8,099 | 21 | 5 | 1 | 5 | ▲4 |
| 2 | Mirra Andreeva | 7,806 | 21 | 9 | 2 | 10 | ▲7 |
| 3 | Aryna Sabalenka | 6,685 | 21 | 1 | 1 | 3 | ▼2 |
| 4 | Coco Gauff (USA) | 6,163 | 21 | 3 | 2 | 7 | ▼1 |
| 5 | Jessica Pegula (USA) | 6,160 | 21 | 6 | 3 | 6 | ▲1 |
| 6 | Elina Svitolina (UKR) | 5,921 | 21 | 14 | 6 | 13 | ▲8 |
| 7 | Linda Nosková (CZE) | 4,743 | 21 | 13 | 6 | 14 | ▲7 |
| 8 | Karolína Muchová (CZE) | 4,665 | 20 | 19 | 6 | 20 | ▲11 |
| 9 | Iga Świątek (POL) | 4,188 | 19 | 2 | 2 | 9 | ▼7 |
| 10 | Marta Kostyuk (UKR) | 3,910 | 20 | 26 | 10 | 28 | ▲16 |
| 11 | Diana Shnaider | 3,238 | 23 | 21 | 11 | 25 | ▲10 |
| 12 | Maja Chwalińska (POL) | 3,016 | 23 | 133 | 11 | 146 | ▲121 |
| 13 | Iva Jovic (USA) | 2,941 | 22 | 35 | 11 | 35 | ▲22 |
| 14 | Elise Mertens (BEL) | 2,540 | 23 | 20 | 14 | 27 | ▲6 |
| 15 | Alexandra Eala (PHI) | 2,392 | 29 | 50 | 15 | 53 | ▲35 |
| 16 | Sorana Cîrstea (ROU) | 2,386 | 23 | 44 | 15 | 41 | ▲28 |
| 17 | Naomi Osaka (JPN) | 2,315 | 20 | 16 | 13 | 19 | ▼1 |
| 18 | Leylah Fernandez (CAN) | 2,201 | 28 | 22 | 18 | 34 | ▲4 |
| 19 | Madison Keys (USA) | 2,175 | 19 | 7 | 7 | 28 | ▼12 |
| 20 | Belinda Bencic (SUI) | 2,168 | 18 | 11 | 9 | 20 | ▼9 |

==== No. 1 ranking ====
| Holder | Date gained | Date forfeited |
|---|---|---|
| Aryna Sabalenka | **Year-end 2025** | 13 September 2026 |
| Elena Rybakina (KAZ) | 14 September 2026 | **Year-end 2026** |

=== Doubles ===
Final Doubles Race rankings
| No. | Player | Points | Tourn |
|---|---|---|---|
| 1 | Gabriela Dabrowski (CAN); Luisa Stefani (BRA) | 8,495 | 16 |
| 2 | **Taylor Townsend** (USA); **Kateřina Siniaková** (CZE) | 8,370 | 9 |
| 3 | Aleksandra Krunic (SRB); Anna Danilina (KAZ) | 5,638 | 14 |
| 4 | Kristina Mladenovic (FRA); Guo Hanyu (CHN) | 3,976 | 12 |
| 5 | Nicole Melichar-Martinez (USA); Cristina Bucsa (ESP) | 3,740 | 16 |
| 6 | Hsieh Su-wei (TPE); Jeļena Ostapenko (LAT) | 3,328 | 9 |
| 7 | Demi Schuurs (NED); Ellen Perez (AUS) | 3,130 | 22 |
| 8 | Zhang Shuai (CHN); Elise Mertens (BEL) | 3,018 | 9 |
| 9 | Sara Errani (ITA); Jasmine Paolini (ITA) | 2,917 | 12 |
| 10 | Tereza Mihalíková (SVK); Olivia Nicholls (GBR) | 2,560 | 24 |

WTA Doubles Year-End Rankings
| # | Player | Points | #Trn | '25 Rk | High | Low | '25→'26 |
|---|---|---|---|---|---|---|---|
| 1 | Kateřina Siniaková (CZE) | 11,960 | 16 | 1 | 1 | 3 | Steady |
| 2 | Taylor Townsend (USA) | 9,920 | 11 | 2 | 2 | 9 | Steady |
| 3 | Gabriela Dabrowski (CAN) | 8,845 | 19 | 10 | 2 | 10 | ▲7 |
| = | Luisa Stefani (BRA) | 8,845 | 18 | 14 | 3 | 14 | ▲11 |
| 5 | Zhang Shuai (CHN) | 6,575 | 28 | 16 | 5 | 16 | ▲11 |
| 6 | Aleksandra Krunić (SRB) | 6,030 | 18 | 17 | 4 | 17 | ▲11 |
| 7 | Anna Danilina (KAZ) | 5,930 | 24 | 15 | 4 | 14 | ▲8 |
| 8 | Kristina Mladenovic (FRA) | 4,960 | 24 | 60 | 8 | 88 | ▲52 |
| 9 | Sara Errani (ITA) | 4,900 | 19 | 3 | 3 | 17 | ▼6 |
| 10 | Nicole Melichar-Martinez (USA) | 4,855 | 26 | 18 | 8 | 18 | ▲8 |
| 11 | Cristina Bucșa (ESP) | 4,405 | 22 | 28 | 11 | 28 | ▲17 |
| 12 | Elise Mertens (BEL) | 4,403 | 13 | 5 | 1 | 12 | ▼7 |
| 13 | Guo Hanyu (CHN) | 4,375 | 14 | 22 | 9 | 26 | ▲9 |
| 14 | Hsieh Su-wei (TPE) | 4,070 | 16 | 9 | 8 | 15 | ▼5 |
| 15 | Jeļena Ostapenko (LAT) | 3,925 | 20 | 7 | 5 | 17 | ▼8 |
| 16 | Jasmine Paolini (ITA) | 3,916 | 13 | 3 | 3 | 37 | ▼13 |
| 17 | Vera Zvonareva | 3,707 | 17 | 796 | 14 | 790 | ▲779 |
| 18 | Diana Shnaider | 3,423 | 15 | 11 | 11 | 33 | ▼7 |
| 19 | Aldila Sutjiadi (INA) | 3,413 | 28 | 51 | 16 | 54 | ▲32 |
| 20 | Storm Hunter (AUS) | 3,335 | 21 | 33 | 17 | 32 | ▲13 |

**Champions** in bold
Runners-up in italics

Qualified for the WTA Finals.
Qualifiers who withdrew indicated in italics.

==== No. 1 ranking ====
| Holder | Date gained | Date forfeited |
|---|---|---|
| Kateřina Siniaková (CZE) | **Year-end 2025** | 1 February 2026 |
| Elise Mertens (BEL) | 2 February 2026 | 3 May 2026 |
| Kateřina Siniaková (CZE) | 4 May 2026 | **Year-end 2026** |

== Points distribution ==
Points are awarded as follows:

| Category | W | F | SF | QF | R16 | R32 | R64 | R128 | Q | Q3 | Q2 | Q1 |
| Grand Slam (128S) | 2000 | 1300 | 780 | 430 | 240 | 130 | 70 | 10 | 40 | 30 | 20 | 2 |
| Grand Slam (64D) | 2000 | 1300 | 780 | 430 | 240 | 130 | 10 | – | – | – | – | – |
| WTA Finals (8S/8D) | 1500* | 1000* | 600* | (+200 per round robin win) | | | | | | | | |
| WTA 1000 (96S) | 1000 | 650 | 390 | 215 | 120 | 65 | 35 | 10 | 30 | – | 20 | 2 |
| WTA 1000 (56S) | 1000 | 650 | 390 | 215 | 120 | 65 | 10 | – | 30 | – | 20 | 2 |
| WTA 1000 (32/28D) | 1000 | 650 | 390 | 215 | 120 | 10 | – | – | – | – | – | – |
| WTA 500 (48S) | 500 | 325 | 195 | 108 | 60 | 32 | 1 | – | 25 | – | 13 | 1 |
| WTA 500 (30/28S) | 500 | 325 | 195 | 108 | 60 | 1 | – | – | 25 | – | 13 | 1 |
| WTA 500 (24D) | 500 | 325 | 195 | 108 | 60 | 1 | – | – | – | – | – | – |
| WTA 500 (16D) | 500 | 325 | 195 | 108 | 1 | – | – | – | – | – | – | – |
| WTA 250 (32S) | 250 | 163 | 98 | 54 | 30 | 1 | – | – | 18 | – | 12 | 1 |
| WTA 250 (16D) | 250 | 163 | 98 | 54 | 1 | – | – | – | – | – | – | – |
| United Cup | 500 (max) | For details, see 2026 United Cup | | | | | | | | | | |

S = singles players, D = doubles teams
* Assumes undefeated round robin match record

== Prize money leaders ==
Prize money in US$ as of 16 November 2026
| No. | Player | Singles | Doubles | Mixed | Year-to-date |
|---|---|---|---|---|---|
| 1 | (Kazakhstan) Elena Rybakina | $11,134,420 | $0 | $0 | $11,134,420 |
| 2 | Mirra Andreeva | $10,156,260 | $366,355 | $0 | $10,522,615 |
| 3 | Aryna Sabalenka | $8,577,428 | $7,815 | $0 | $8,585,243 |
| 4 | (Czech Republic) Linda Nosková | $7,701,606 | $584,678 | $0 | $8,286,284 |
| 5 | (United States) Coco Gauff | $7,674,801 | $82,695 | $0 | $7,757,496 |
| 6 | (United States) Jessica Pegula | $6,278,571 | $166,648 | $0 | $6,445,219 |
| 7 | (Ukraine) Elina Svitolina | $6,021,460 | $1,010 | $0 | $6,022,470 |
| 8 | (Czech Republic) Karolína Muchová | $5,160,957 | $11,215 | $0 | $5,172,172 |
| 9 | (Ukraine) Marta Kostyuk | $4,480,835 | $100,062 | $0 | $4,580,897 |
| 10 | (Poland) Iga Świątek | $4,499,239 | $0 | $0 | $4,499,239 |

== Retirements ==
The following is a list of notable players (winners of a main tour title, and/or part of the WTA rankings top 100 in singles, or top 100 in doubles, for at least one week) who announced their retirement from professional tennis, became inactive (after not playing for more than 52 weeks), or were banned from competition for a minimum of 12 months, during the 2026 season:

- (Hungary) Tímea Babos joined the professional tour in 2011 and reached career-high rankings of No. 25 in singles in September 2016 and No. 1 in doubles in July 2018. She won three singles and 29 doubles titles, including four major doubles titles at the 2018 and 2020 Australian Opens, 2019 and 2020 French Opens, and three consecutive titles at the 2017, 2018 and 2019 WTA Finals. Babos announced in November 2025, that she is going to take a break from tennis, wanting to focus on starting a family, but later would like to return to competitions and play at the 2028 Summer Olympics. Her final appearance before starting her hiatus was at the 2026 Australian Open.
- (United Kingdom) Alicia Barnett joined the professional tour in 2016 and reached a career-high ranking of No. 59 in doubles in October 2022. She won one career doubles title. Barnett announced her retirement from professional tennis in September 2026.
- (Romania) Ana Bogdan joined the professional tour in 2009 and reached a career-high ranking of No. 39 in singles in July 2023. Bogdan retired from professional tennis in October 2026.
- (Spain) Aliona Bolsova joined the professional tour in 2018 and reached career-high rankings of No. 88 in singles in July 2019 and No. 54 in doubles in December 2022. Bolsova retired from professional tennis in April 2026, having made her final appearance at the 2026 Catalonia Open Solgironès.
- (Chinese Taipei) Latisha Chan joined the professional tour in 2004 and reached career-high rankings of No. 1 in doubles in October 2017 and No. 50 in singles in June 2007. She won 33 career doubles titles, including a major title in women's doubles at the 2017 US Open and three majors in mixed doubles at the 2018 and 2019 French Opens, and 2019 Wimbledon Championships. Chan announced her retirement from professional tennis in January 2026.
- (Romania) Sorana Cîrstea joined the professional tour in 2006 and reached a new career-high ranking of No. 15 in singles in September 2026, having previously reached the career-high ranking of No. 21 in singles on 12 August 2013, and No. 35 in doubles in March 2009. She won four singles and seven doubles titles. Cîrstea announced in December 2025 that she would retire at the end of the 2026 season, after 20 years on the tour, having made her final appearance at the 2026 Hong Kong Tennis Open.
- (Mexico) Fernanda Contreras Gómez joined the professional tour in 2019 and reached a career-high ranking of No. 99 in doubles in May 2023. Contreras Gómez announced her retirement from professional tennis in February 2026.
- (Kazakhstan) Zarina Diyas joined the professional tour in 2007 and reached career-high rankings of No. 31 in singles in January 2015 and No. 89 in doubles in June 2015. She won one career singles title, at the 2017 Japan Women's Open. Diyas announced her retirement in April 2026, having made her final appearance at the 2026 Australian Open.
- (South Korea) Jang Su-jeong joined the professional tour in 2013 and reached a career-high ranking of No. 82 in doubles in May 2023. Jang announced her retirement from professional tennis in November 2026.
- (Croatia) Darija Jurak Schreiber joined the professional tour in 2001 and reached a career-high singles ranking of No. 188 in singles in April 2004 and No. 9 in Doubles in November 2021. She won 9 career doubles titles. Jurak Schreiber retired from professional tennis in September 2026 having made her final appearance at the 2026 US Open partnering compatriot Antonia Ružić.
- Lidziya Marozava joined the professional tour in 2009 and reached a career-high ranking of No. 37 in doubles in October 2018. She won four career doubles titles. Marozava retired from professional tennis in July 2026.
- (Spain) Nuria Párrizas Díaz joined the professional tour in 2008 and reached a career-high ranking of No. 45 in singles in March 2022. Párrizas Díaz announced her retirement from professional tennis in July 2026.
- (Poland) Alicja Rosolska joined the professional tour in 2003 and reached a career-high ranking of No. 23 in doubles in June 2019. She won nine career doubles titles. Rosolska announced her retirement from professional tennis in July 2026, with her final appearance being the 2026 Polish Open.
- (Latvia) Anastasija Sevastova joined the professional tour in 2006 and reached career-high rankings of No. 11 in singles in October 2018 and No. 56 in doubles in December 2018. She won four career singles titles. Sevastova announced her retirement from professional tennis in April 2026.
- (Ukraine) Lesia Tsurenko joined the professional tour in 2007 and reached a career-high ranking of No. 23 in singles in February 2019. She won four career singles titles. After less than two years of inactivity, Tsurenko announced her retirement from professional tennis in November 2026, despite having last played in 2024.

=== Inactivity ===
==== Without playing a match for over a year ====
- Victoria Azarenka
- (Romania) Mihaela Buzărnescu
- (United States) Danielle Collins
- (Georgia (country)) Oksana Kalashnikova
- (Croatia) Petra Martić
- (United States) Bethanie Mattek-Sands
- (Serbia) Nina Stojanović
- (Romania) Anca Todoni

==== Maternity ====
- Veronika Kudermetova
- (Serbia) Olga Danilović

==== Suspensions ====
- (Croatia) Jana Fett
- (Czech Republic) Markéta Vondroušová, former world No. 6 and 2023 Wimbledon champion, was announced in June 2026 to be serving a four-year ban from the sport due to a failure to comply with ITIA anti-doping testing protocols. The ban is due to expire on June 21, 2030.

== Comebacks and appearances ==
- (France) Clara Burel returned to the WTA Tour in April 2026 at the Saint-Malo Open, after more than a year of inactivity.
- (Chile) Alexa Guarachi returned to the WTA Tour in February 2026, after two and a half years of inactivity.
- (Montenegro) Danka Kovinić returned to the WTA Tour in May 2026 at the 2026 İstanbul Open, after more than a year of inactivity.
- (Argentina) Nadia Podoroska returned to the WTA Tour after more than a year of inactivity.
- (United States) Serena Williams returned to the WTA Tour in June 2026 at the 2026 Queen's Club Championships after her retirement in September 2022.

== See also ==
- 2026 ATP Tour
- 2026 WTA 125 tournaments
- 2026 ITF Women's World Tennis Tour
