= 2026 Grand Prix SAR La Princesse Lalla Meryem =

- Date: 18 – 23 May
- Edition: 24th
- Category: WTA 250
- Draw: 32S / 16D
- Surface: Clay / outdoor
- Location: Rabat, Morocco
- Venue: Club des Cheminots

Champions

Singles
- (Croatia) Petra Marčinko

Doubles
- (Hong Kong) Eudice Chong / (Belgium) Magali Kempen
- Morocco Open

The 2026 Grand Prix SAR La Princesse Lalla Meryem was a professional women's tennis tournament played on clay courts. It was the 24th edition of the tournament and part of the WTA 250 category of the 2026 WTA Tour. It took place in Rabat, Morocco, between 18 and 23 May 2026.

== Champions ==
=== Singles ===
- (Croatia) Petra Marčinko def. (Ukraine) Anhelina Kalinina, 6–2, 3–0 ret.

=== Doubles ===
- (Hong Kong) Eudice Chong / (Belgium) Magali Kempen def. (Indonesia) Aldila Sutjiadi / Vera Zvonareva, 6–3, 2–6, [10–6]

== Singles main draw entrants ==
=== Seeds ===
Country	Player	Rank^{1}	Seed
INA	Janice Tjen	40	1
ESP	Jéssica Bouzas Maneiro	50	2
GER	Tatjana Maria	54	3
UKR	Yuliia Starodubtseva	58	4
HUN	Anna Bondár	59	5
CRO	Petra Marčinko	69	6
HUN	Panna Udvardy	71	7
USA	Alycia Parks	79	8

- Rankings are as of 4 May 2026.

=== Other entrants ===
The following players received wildcards into the singles main draw:

- (Morocco) Diae El Jardi
- (Morocco) Yasmine Kabbaj
- (Ukraine) Yelyzaveta Kotliar
- (Burundi) Sada Nahimana

The following players received entry using a protected ranking:

- (Turkey) Berfu Cengiz
- (Ukraine) Anhelina Kalinina
- (Montenegro) Danka Kovinić
- (Switzerland) Jil Teichmann

The following players received entry from the qualifying draw:

- (France) Fiona Ferro
- (Sweden) Caijsa Hennemann
- (Sweden) Lisa Zaar
- Vera Zvonareva

=== Withdrawals ===
- (Australia) Kimberly Birrell → replaced by (Slovenia) Polona Hercog
- (United States) Caty McNally → replaced by (Turkey) Berfu Cengiz
- (Uzbekistan) Kamilla Rakhimova → replaced by (Czech Republic) Tereza Martincová
- (Germany) Laura Siegemund → replaced by (United Kingdom) Francesca Jones
- (Turkey) Zeynep Sönmez → replaced by (Austria) Julia Grabher

== Doubles main draw entrants ==
=== Seeds ===
Country	Player	Country	Player	Rank^{1}	Seed
INA	Aldila Sutjiadi		Vera Zvonareva	85	1
JPN	Miyu Kato	MEX	Giuliana Olmos	95	2
JPN	Shuko Aoyama	TPE	Liang En-shuo	112	3
CZE	Anastasia Dețiuc		Irina Khromacheva	116	4

- ^{1} Rankings as of 4 May 2026.

=== Other entrants ===
The following pairs received wildcards into the doubles main draw:

- (Morocco) Diae El Jardi / (Morocco) Yasmine Kabbaj
- (France) Amandine Hesse / (Italy) Dalila Spiteri
