= 2026 Grand Prix SAR La Princesse Lalla Meryem – Doubles =

Doubles
- 2026 Grand Prix SAR La Princesse Lalla Meryem

Final
- Champions: (Hong Kong) Eudice Chong (Belgium) Magali Kempen
- Runners-up: (Indonesia) Aldila Sutjiadi; Vera Zvonareva
- Score: 6–3, 2–6, [10–6]

Events
Singles	Doubles
- Grand Prix SAR La Princesse Lalla Meryem

Eudice Chong and Magali Kempen defeated Aldila Sutjiadi and Vera Zvonareva in the final, 6–3, 2–6, [10–6] to win the doubles tennis title at the 2026 Morocco Open. Chong became the first player representing Hong Kong to win a tour level title since Patricia Hy in 1986.

Maya Joint and Oksana Kalashnikova were the reigning champions, but Joint chose to compete in Strasbourg instead and Kalashnikova did not participate this year.

== Seeds ==
1. (Indonesia) Aldila Sutjiadi / Vera Zvonareva (final)
2. (Japan) Miyu Kato / (Mexico) Giuliana Olmos (first round)
3. (Japan) Shuko Aoyama / (Chinese Taipei) Liang En-shuo (quarterfinals)
4. (Czech Republic) Anastasia Dețiuc / Irina Khromacheva (semifinals)

== Draw ==
Key

- Q = Qualifier
- WC = Wild card
- LL = Lucky loser
- Alt = Alternate
- ITF = ITF entry
- PR = Protected ranking
- SR = Special ranking
- SE = Special exempt
- JE = Junior exempt
- JR = Junior Accelerator Programme entrant
- CO = College Accelerator Programme entrant
- NG = Next Gen Accelerator Program entrant
- w/o = Walkover
- r = Retired
- d = Defaulted

=== Draw ===
First round
1	(Indonesia) A Sutjiadi; V Zvonareva	6	6
(Argentina) N Fossa Huergo (Kazakhstan) Z Kulambayeva	1	1
(United States) C Corley (United States) I Corley	7^{7}	6
WC	(France) A Hesse (Italy) D Spiteri	6^{5}	4
3	(Japan) S Aoyama (Chinese Taipei) E-s Liang	4	6	[10]
(China) S Feng (China) Q Tang	6	2	[3]
(Poland) K Piter (Slovenia) N Radišić	6	2	[10]
WC	(Morocco) D El Jardi (Morocco) Y Kabbaj	4	6	[7]
(Switzerland) N Karamoko (Croatia) P Marčinko	6	2	[10]
(Ukraine) N Kichenok (Japan) M Ninomiya	4	6	[7]
(Netherlands) I Haverlag (United Kingdom) M Lumsden	1	0
4	(Czech Republic) A Dețiuc; I Khromacheva	6	6
(India) R Bhosale (Thailand) P Plipuech	3	1
(Hong Kong) E Chong (Belgium) M Kempen	6	6
PR	(Spain) Y Cavallé Reimers (Belgium) L Salden	6	1	[10]
2	(Japan) M Kato (Mexico) G Olmos	4	6	[7]

Quarterfinals
1	(Indonesia) A Sutjiadi; V Zvonareva	6	6^{7}	[10]
(United States) C Corley (United States) I Corley	4	7^{9}	[5]
3	(Japan) S Aoyama (Chinese Taipei) E-s Liang	5	4
(Poland) K Piter (Slovenia) N Radišić	7	6
(Switzerland) N Karamoko (Croatia) P Marčinko	6^{1}	5
4	(Czech Republic) A Dețiuc; I Khromacheva	7^{7}	7
(Hong Kong) E Chong (Belgium) M Kempen	6	6
PR	(Spain) Y Cavallé Reimers (Belgium) L Salden	3	1

Semifinals
1	(Indonesia) A Sutjiadi; V Zvonareva	4	6	[10]
(Poland) K Piter (Slovenia) N Radišić	6	2	[6]
4	(Czech Republic) A Dețiuc; I Khromacheva	4	1
(Hong Kong) E Chong (Belgium) M Kempen	6	6

Final
1	(Indonesia) A Sutjiadi; V Zvonareva	3	6	[6]
(Hong Kong) E Chong (Belgium) M Kempen	6	2	[10]
