= 2026 Grand Prix SAR La Princesse Lalla Meryem – Singles =

Singles
- 2026 Grand Prix SAR La Princesse Lalla Meryem

Final
- Champion: (Croatia) Petra Marčinko
- Runner-up: (Ukraine) Anhelina Kalinina
- Score: 6–2, 3–0 ret.

Details
- Draw: 32
- Seeds: 8

Events
| Singles | Doubles |
- Grand Prix SAR La Princesse Lalla Meryem

Petra Marčinko won the singles tennis title at the 2026 Morocco Open, after Anhelina Kalinina retired at 6–2, 3–0 in the final. It was her first WTA Tour title.

Maya Joint was the reigning champion, but chose to compete in Strasbourg instead.

Yasmine Kabbaj became the second Moroccan woman to reach the quarterfinals of a WTA tour event in the Open Era after Nadia Lalami in 2011.

This also marked the sixth consecutive edition of the tournament being won by a first time titleholder, dating to 2019.

== Seeds ==
1. (Indonesia) Janice Tjen (second round)
2. (Spain) Jéssica Bouzas Maneiro (quarterfinals)
3. (Germany) Tatjana Maria (second round)
4. (Ukraine) Yuliia Starodubtseva (second round)
5. (Hungary) Anna Bondár (quarterfinals)
6. (Croatia) Petra Marčinko (champion)
7. (Hungary) Panna Udvardy (semifinals)
8. (United States) Alycia Parks (second round)

== Draw ==
Key

- Q = Qualifier
- WC = Wild card
- LL = Lucky loser
- Alt = Alternate
- ITF = ITF entry
- PR = Protected ranking
- SR = Special ranking
- SE = Special exempt
- JE = Junior exempt
- JR = Junior Accelerator Programme entrant
- CO = College Accelerator Programme entrant
- NG = Next Gen Accelerator Program entrant
- w/o = Walkover
- r = Retired
- d = Defaulted

=== Finals ===
Semifinals
7 | (Hungary) Panna Udvardy | 0 | 3
PR | (Ukraine) Anhelina Kalinina | 6 | 6
PR | (Switzerland) Jil Teichmann | 6^{2} | 3
6 | (Croatia) Petra Marčinko | 7^{7} | 6

Final
PR | (Ukraine) Anhelina Kalinina | 2 | 0^{r}
6 | (Croatia) Petra Marčinko | 6 | 3

=== Top half ===
First round
1 | (Indonesia) J Tjen | 6 | 7
Q | (Sweden) C Hennemann | 1 | 5
(Czech Republic) T Martincová | 0 | 4
(Colombia) C Osorio | 6 | 6
WC | (Burundi) S Nahimana | 6 | 7
(Australia) A Tomljanović | 3 | 5
(Belgium) H Vandewinkel | 4 | 2
7 | (Hungary) P Udvardy | 6 | 6
4 | (Ukraine) Y Starodubtseva | 6 | 6
(Spain) Á Fita Boluda | 4 | 2
(Switzerland) S Waltert | 3 | 4
PR | (Ukraine) A Kalinina | 6 | 6
(Colombia) E Arango | 6 | 4 | 6
(Germany) E Seidel | 3 | 6 | 1
(Slovenia) P Hercog | 1^{r}
5 | (Hungary) A Bondár | 1

Second round
1 | (Indonesia) J Tjen | 3 | 6 | 0
(Colombia) C Osorio | 6 | 3 | 6
WC | (Burundi) S Nahimana | 4 | 1
7 | (Hungary) P Udvardy | 6 | 6
4 | (Ukraine) Y Starodubtseva | 3 | 6^{3}
PR | (Ukraine) A Kalinina | 6 | 7^{7}
(Colombia) E Arango | 6^{6} | 6 | 0
5 | (Hungary) A Bondár | 7^{8} | 1 | 6

Quarterfinals
(Colombia) C Osorio | 5 | 3
7 | (Hungary) P Udvardy | 7 | 6
PR | (Ukraine) A Kalinina | 6 | 7
5 | (Hungary) A Bondár | 4 | 5

Semifinals
7 | (Hungary) P Udvardy | 0 | 3
PR | (Ukraine) A Kalinina | 6 | 6

=== Bottom half ===
First round
8 | (United States) A Parks | 6 | 6
(Japan) M Uchijima | 2 | 4
PR | (Switzerland) J Teichmann | 6 | 7^{7}
(Austria) J Grabher | 4 | 6^{5}
WC | (Morocco) Y Kabbaj | 7^{7} | 6
PR | (Turkey) B Cengiz | 6^{4} | 3
WC | (Morocco) D El Jardi | 2 | 4
3 | (Germany) T Maria | 6 | 6
6 | (Croatia) P Marčinko | 6 | 6
Q | V Zvonareva | 2 | 4
(United Kingdom) F Jones | 6 | 3 | 4
WC | (Ukraine) Y Kotliar | 2 | 6 | 6
Q | (France) F Ferro | 6 | 6
PR | (Montenegro) D Kovinić | 2 | 3
Q | (Sweden) L Zaar | 0 | 5
2 | (Spain) J Bouzas Maneiro | 6 | 7

Second round
8 | (United States) A Parks | 3 | 4
PR | (Switzerland) J Teichmann | 6 | 6
WC | (Morocco) Y Kabbaj | 6 | 6
3 | (Germany) T Maria | 2 | 4
6 | (Croatia) P Marčinko | 5 | 6 | 7^{7}
WC | (Ukraine) Y Kotliar | 7 | 2 | 6^{1}
Q | (France) F Ferro | 6 | 6^{2} | 3
2 | (Spain) J Bouzas Maneiro | 2 | 7^{7} | 6

Quarterfinals
PR | (Switzerland) J Teichmann | 6 | 5 | 7^{8}
WC | (Morocco) Y Kabbaj | 1 | 7 | 6^{6}
6 | (Croatia) P Marčinko | 6 | 6
2 | (Spain) J Bouzas Maneiro | 3 | 4

Semifinals
PR | (Switzerland) J Teichmann | 6^{2} | 3
6 | (Croatia) P Marčinko | 7^{7} | 6

== Qualifying ==
=== Seeds ===
1. (France) Fiona Ferro (qualified)
2. Anastasia Zolotareva (qualifying competition)
3. (Italy) Dalila Spiteri (qualifying competition)
4. (Brazil) Carolina Alves (first round)
5. (Argentina) Victoria Bosio (first round)
6. (Armenia) Elina Avanesyan (qualifying competition)
7. Vera Zvonareva (qualified)
8. (Sweden) Caijsa Hennemann (qualified)

=== Qualifiers ===
1. (France) Fiona Ferro
2. Vera Zvonareva
3. (Sweden) Caijsa Hennemann
4. (Sweden) Lisa Zaar

=== Qualifying draw ===
==== First qualifier ====
First round
1/WC | (France) Fiona Ferro | 6 | 6
Ekaterina Kazionova | 1 | 0
(France) Amandine Hesse | 6^{6} | 2
6 | (Armenia) Elina Avanesyan | 7^{8} | 6

Qualifying competition
1/WC | (France) Fiona Ferro | 6^{1} | 6 | 6
6 | (Armenia) Elina Avanesyan | 7^{7} | 0 | 3

==== Second qualifier ====
First round
2 | Anastasia Zolotareva | 7 | 6
(Kazakhstan) Zhibek Kulambayeva | 5 | 3
(Italy) Diletta Cherubini | 1 | 0
7 | Vera Zvonareva | 6 | 6

Qualifying competition
2 | Anastasia Zolotareva | 4 | 4
7 | Vera Zvonareva | 6 | 6

==== Third qualifier ====
First round
3 | (Italy) Dalila Spiteri | 6 | 3 | 6
(Spain) Georgina García Pérez | 3 | 6 | 3
(Spain) Maria Teixidó Garcia | 3 | 3
8 | (Sweden) Caijsa Hennemann | 6 | 6

Qualifying competition
3 | (Italy) Dalila Spiteri | 4 | 6 | 2
8 | (Sweden) Caijsa Hennemann | 6 | 2 | 6

==== Fourth qualifier ====
First round
4 | (Brazil) Carolina Alves | 1 | 5
(Sweden) Lisa Zaar | 6 | 7
(United States) Alana Smith | 6 | 6
5 | (Argentina) Victoria Bosio | 1 | 3

Qualifying competition
(Sweden) Lisa Zaar | 6 | 6
(United States) Alana Smith | 2 | 4
