= Yelyzaveta Kotliar =

Ukrainian tennis player (born 2007)

- Country (sports): Ukraine
- Born: 1 February 2007 (age 19) Dnipro, Ukraine
- Plays: Right-handed
- Coach: Yuriy Chornyy; Anastasiya Vasylyeva
- Prize money: $26,443

Singles
- Career record: 70–46
- Career titles: 2 ITF
- Highest ranking: No. 498 (20 October 2025)
- Current ranking: No. 528 (18 May 2026)

Grand Slam singles results
- French Open Junior: 1R (2025)

Doubles
- Career record: 6–9
- Highest ranking: No. 1168 (27 February 2023)
- Current ranking: No. 1624 (22 September 2025)
- Last updated on: 22 September 2025.

Yelyzaveta Kotliar (born 1 February 2007) is a Ukrainian tennis player. She has a career-high singles ranking of world No. 498 by the WTA, achieved on 20 October 2025.

== Early and personal life ==
She started playing tennis at the age of 8 years-old. Her father Konstantin was a competitive swimmer but a tennis enthusiast and encouraged her play. From the age of 11 years-old she was coached by Yuriy Chornyy and his wife Anastasiya Vasylyeva. She trained at the Maximus Tennis Club in her home city of Dnipro, Dnipropetrovsk Oblast prior to the Russian invasion of Ukraine, after which she based herself in Poland and trained at the Olimpia Tennis Park in Poznań.

== Career ==
=== Juniors ===
In December 2019, as a 12 year-old, she reached the final of the U.S. Junior Orange Bowl in the United States, after she defeated Alina Korneeva from Russia in straight sets 6-4, 6-4 in the semi-final before facing another Russian, Mirra Andreeva in the final.

In October 2023, she won the J200 event in Vigo, defeating Dutchwoman Joy de Zeeuw in the final. She played in the junior event at the 2024 Australian Open and apologised after receiving criticism from the Ukrainian Tennis Federation for shaking hands after her first-round match in the girls' singles against her Russian opponent Vlada Minchev in which she lost in straight sets, despite Ukrainian players almost uniformly refusing to shake hands of Russian or Belarusian players following Russia’s invasion of Ukraine in 2022.

=== Professional ===
At an ITF tournament in Bydgoszcz, Poland, at the end of August 2022, she advanced from the qualifiers stage to the semifinals.

In May 2025, she was awarded a wildcard into the main singles draw of the Morocco Open in Rabat. Kotliar lost to Jaqueline Cristian in the first round.

Ranked No. 528 and once again benefitting from a wildcard entry, Kotliar defeated Francesca Jones in three sets at the 2026 Morocco Open to record her first WTA Tour main-draw win. She lost to sixth seed Petra Marčinko in the second round.

== ITF Circuit finals ==
=== Singles: 6 (3 titles, 3 runner-ups) ===
| Legend W35 tournaments W15 tournaments | Finals by surface Clay (3–3) |

| Result | W–L | Date | Tournament | Tier | Surface | Opponent | Score |
|---|---|---|---|---|---|---|---|
| Loss | 0–1 | Sep 2024 | ITF Varna, Bulgaria | W15 | Clay | (Romania) Georgia Crăciun | 5–7, 0–6 |
| Win | 1–1 | Mar 2025 | ITF Antalya, Turkey | W15 | Clay | (Turkey) Ilay Yoruk | 3–6, 6–4, 6–1 |
| Loss | 1–2 | Mar 2025 | ITF Antalya, Turkey | W15 | Clay | Arina Bulatova | 3–6, 4–6 |
| Win | 2–2 | Sep 2025 | ITF Cap d'Agde, France | W15 | Clay | (Switzerland) Fiona Ganz | 6–2, 6–2 |
| Win | 3–2 | Mar 2026 | ITF Le Havre, France | W15 | Clay (i) | (France) Nina Radovanović | 6–3, 7–5 |
| Loss | 3–3 | Aug 2026 | ITF Bydgoszcz, Poland | W35 | Clay | (Poland) Daria Kuczer | 7–6^{(6)}, 6–7^{(5)} 1–6 |

=== Doubles: 2 (1 title, 1 runner-up) ===
| Legend W35 tournaments W15 tournaments | Finals by surface Hard (1–0) Clay (0–1) |

| Result | W–L | Date | Tournament | Tier | Surface | Partner | Opponents | Score |
|---|---|---|---|---|---|---|---|---|
| Loss | 0–1 | Mar 2024 | ITF Antalya, Turkey | W15 | Clay | (Ukraine) Antonina Sushkova | (Italy) Tyra Caterina Grant (Italy) Aurora Zantedeschi | 2–6, 2–6 |
| Win | 1–1 | Oct 2026 | ITF Lagos, Portugal | W35 | Hard | (India) Maaya Rajeshwaran | (China) Liu Min (Italy) Carlotta Moccia | 0–6, 6–2, [10–7] |
