= 2026 WTA Finals =

- Date: November 8–15
- Edition: 55th (singles) / 50th (doubles)
- Draw: 8S / 8D
- Prize money: $10,000,000
- Surface: Hard
- Location: Indian Wells, United States
- Venue: Indian Wells Tennis Garden

Champions

Singles
- Mirra Andreeva

Doubles
- (Czech Republic) Kateřina Siniaková / (United States) Taylor Townsend
- WTA Finals

The 2026 WTA Finals (officially the Fage WTA Finals Indian Wells for sponsorship purposes) was a professional women's year-end championship tennis tournament that was run from November 8 – 15, 2026 by the Women's Tennis Association (WTA). It was played in Indian Wells, United States and was the 55th edition of the singles event and the 50th edition of the doubles competition. The tournament was contested by the eight highest-ranked singles players and doubles teams of the 2026 WTA Tour.

It was originally scheduled to be held in Riyadh, Saudi Arabia for November 7 – 14 on what would be for the third consecutive year, but due to safety concerns over the 2026 Iran War, it was moved to the United States after the three-year hosting contract in Saudi Arabia ended six months early.

== Champions ==
=== Singles ===
- Mirra Andreeva def. (Ukraine) Elina Svitolina, 7–5, 6–3

=== Doubles ===
- (Czech Republic) Kateřina Siniaková / (United States) Taylor Townsend def. (Italy) Sara Errani / (Italy) Jasmine Paolini, 6–4, 6–3

== Tournament ==
=== Qualifying ===
Eight players/teams to compete in singles/doubles. To qualify, players/teams have to play a minimum of eight WTA 1000 or WTA 500 tournaments during the season. Players/teams are qualified in the following sequence:

1. Ranked top seven in the leaderboard;
2. The highest-ranked current-year Grand Slam winning player/team ranked from eighth to twentieth;
3. The second-highest-ranked current-year Grand Slam winning player/team ranked from eighth to twentieth, if one player/team ranked in the top seven withdraws;
4. The next player who is ranked eighth or below.

In the singles, point totals are calculated by combining point totals from eighteen tournaments (excluding ITF and WTA 125 tournaments). Of these eighteen tournaments, a player's results from the following events are included:

- The four Grand Slam events;
- Six best mandatory WTA 1000 tournaments from the following seven events: Indian Wells, Miami, Madrid, Rome, Toronto/Montreal, Cincinnati and Beijing;
- The best mandatory WTA 1000 tournament from the following three events: Doha, Dubai and Wuhan;
- The best seven results from any other mandatory WTA 1000, WTA 500 and WTA 250 tournaments.

In the doubles, point totals are calculated by any combination of twelve tournaments throughout the year. Unlike in the singles, this combination does not need to include results from the Grand Slams or WTA 1000 tournaments.

=== Format ===
Both the singles and doubles event features eight players/teams in a round-robin event, split into two groups of four.

Over the first six days of competition, each player/team meets the other three players/teams in her group, with the top two in each group advancing to the semifinals. The first-placed player/team in one group meets the second-placed player/team in the other group, and vice versa. The winners of each semifinal meet in the championship match.

=== Round robin tie-breaking methods ===
The final standings are made using these methods:

1. Greatest number of match wins
2. Greatest number of matches played
3. Head-to-head results if only two players are tied, or if three players are tied then:

a. If three players each have the same number of wins, a player having played less than all three matches is automatically eliminated and the player advancing to the single-elimination competition is the winner of the match-up of the two remaining tied players.
b. Highest percentage of sets won
c. Highest percentage of games won

== Prize money and points ==
The total prize money for the 2026 WTA Finals is US$10,000,000, a decrease of 35.5% compared to the 2025 edition. The tables below break down the prize money, participation fees are prorated on a per match basis.

Stage	Prize money		Points
Stage	Singles	Doubles (Note: Prize money for doubles is per team.)	Points
Final win	$1,640,000	$330,000	500
Semifinal win	$820,000	$155,000	400
Round robin per match win	$230,000	$50,000	200
Participation Fee	3 matches = $220,000; 2 matches = $180,000; 1 match = $150,000	3 matches = $90,000; 2 matches = $75,000; 1 match = $60,000	—N/a
Alternates	$100,000	$40,000	—N/a

- An undefeated champion would earn the maximum 1,500 points and $3,370,000 in singles¹ or $725,000 in doubles².
- Alternate fees are also prorated on a per-match basis. Singles: 0 matches = $100,000, 1 match = $140,000, 2 matches = $170,000. Doubles: 0 matches= $40,000, 1 match = $55,000, 2 matches= $70,000

¹ - Singles breakdown

  $220,000: Participation fee 3 matches
  $690,000: 3 RR wins @ $230,000/each
  $820,000: Semifinal win
$1,640,000: Final win
$3,370,000: Total prize money for undefeated champion

² - Doubles breakdown

   $90,000: Participation fee 3 matches
  $150,000: 3 RR wins @ $50,000/each
  $155,000: Semifinal win
  $330,000: Final win
  $725,000: Total prize money for undefeated champions

== Qualified players ==
=== Singles ===
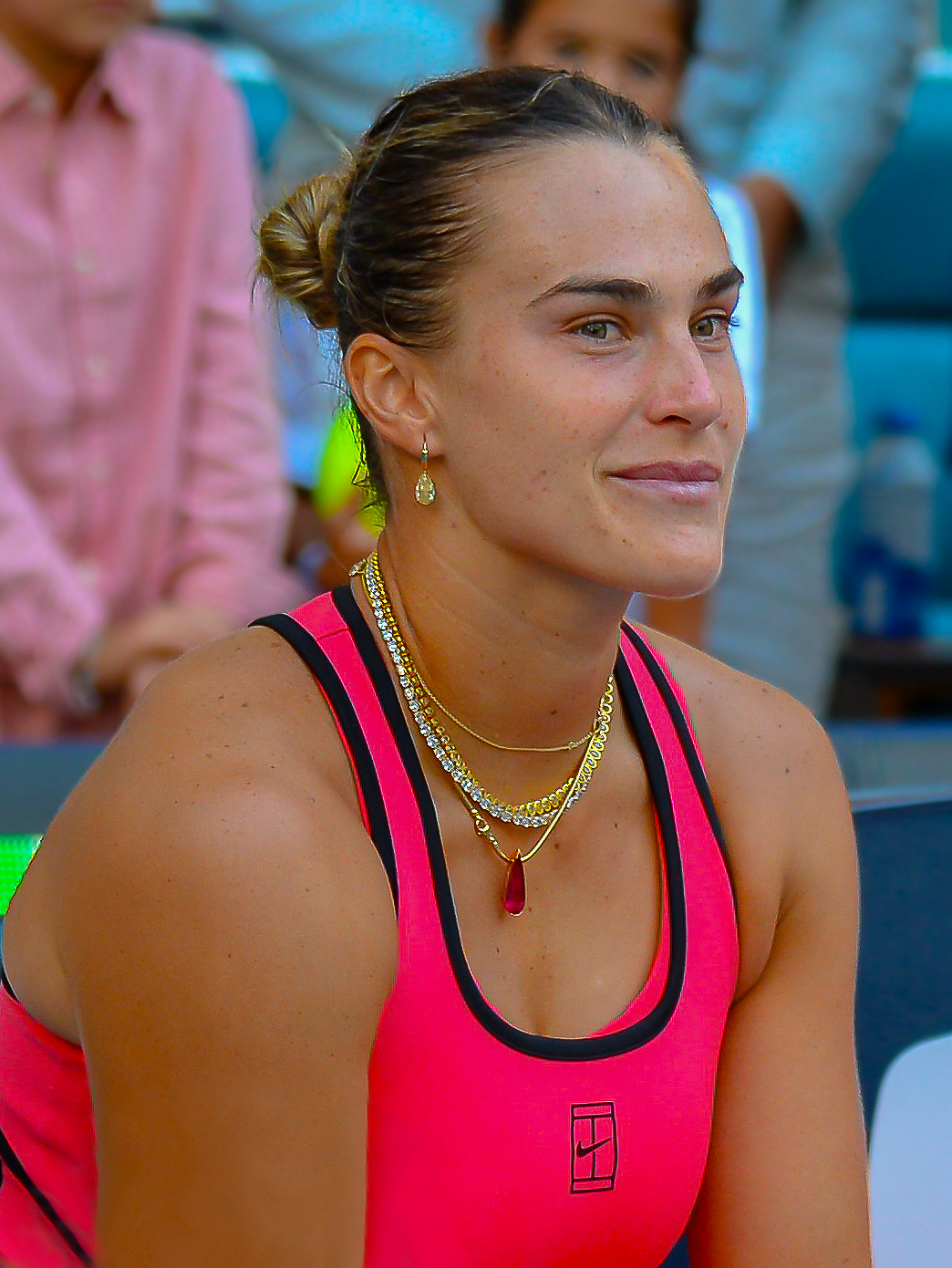
Sabalenka

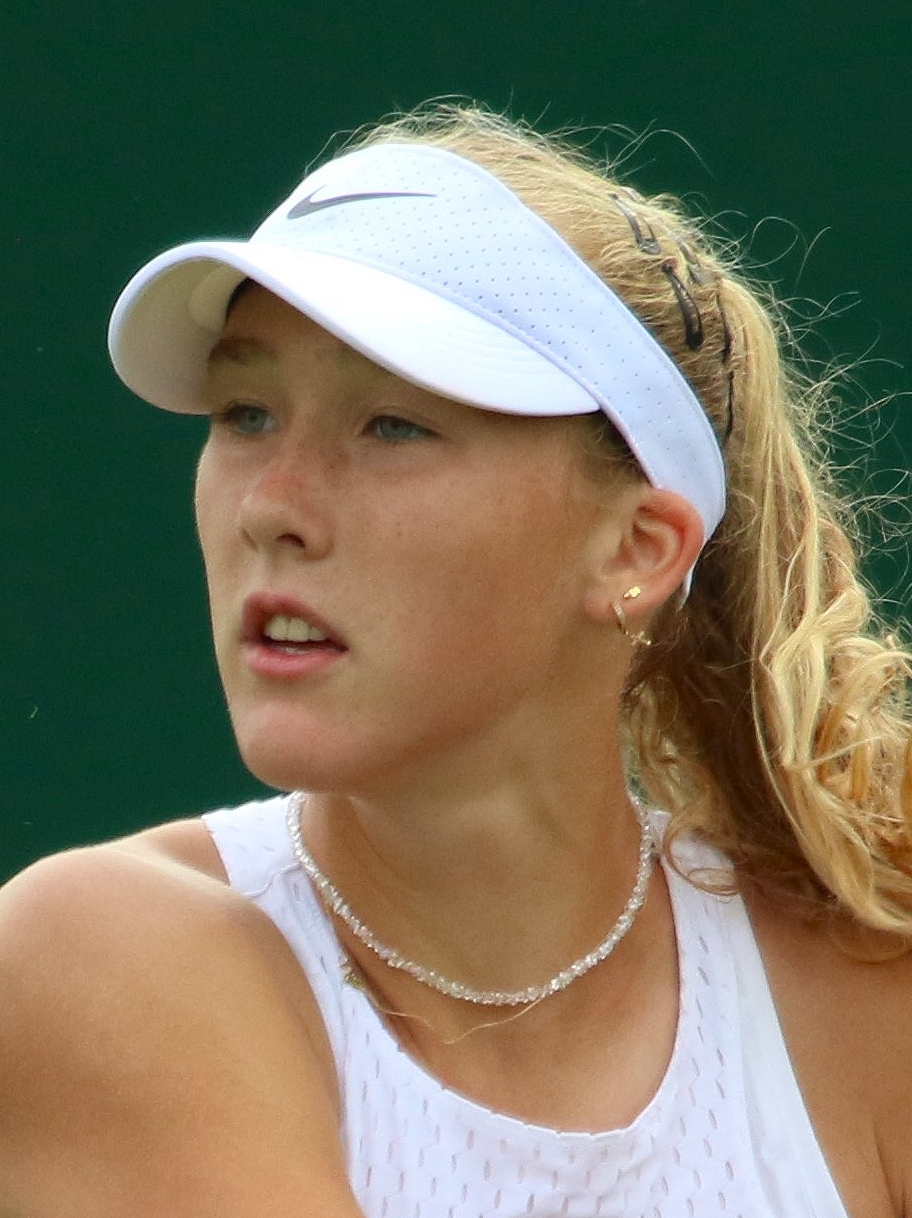
Andreeva

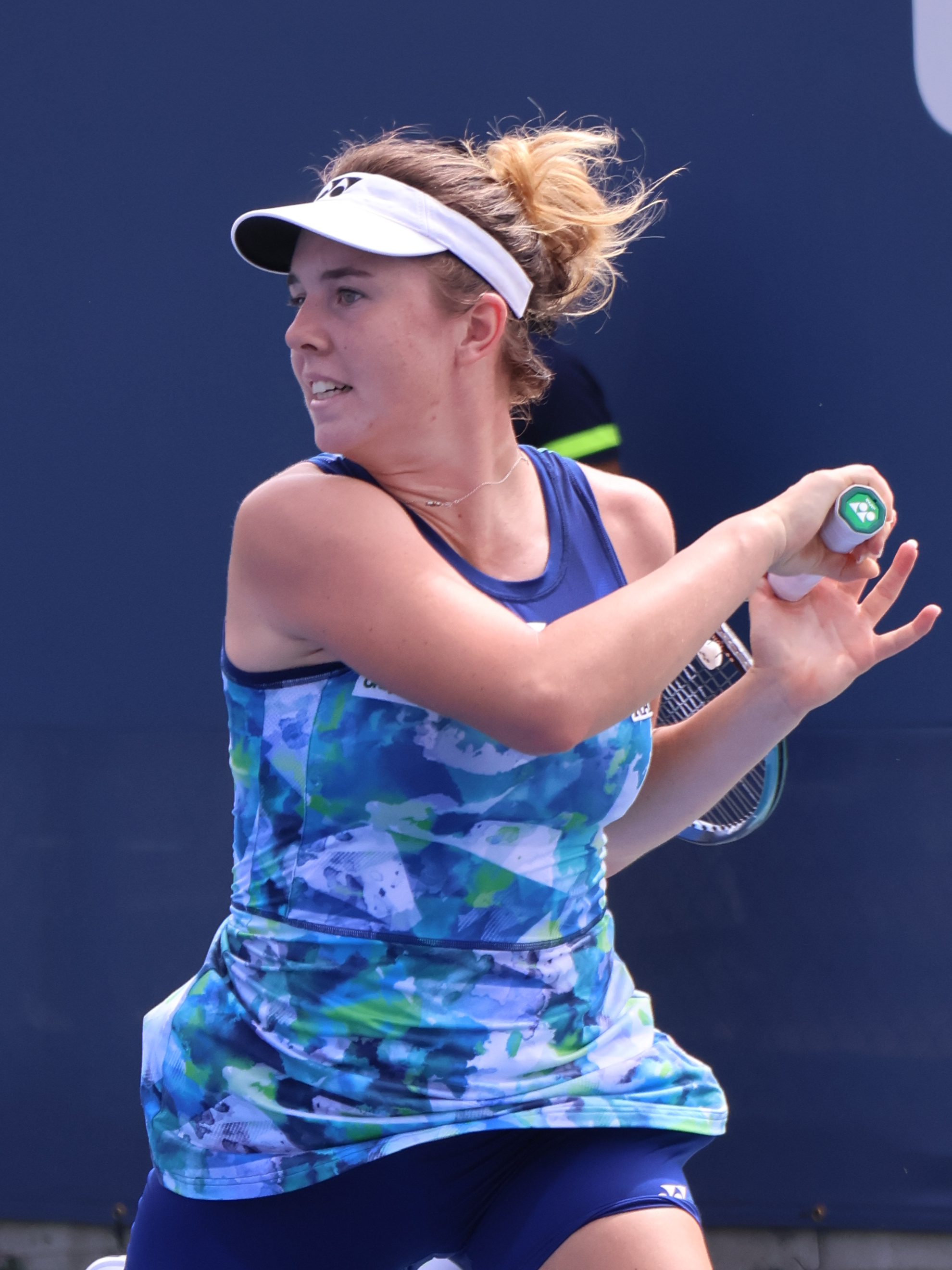
Nosková

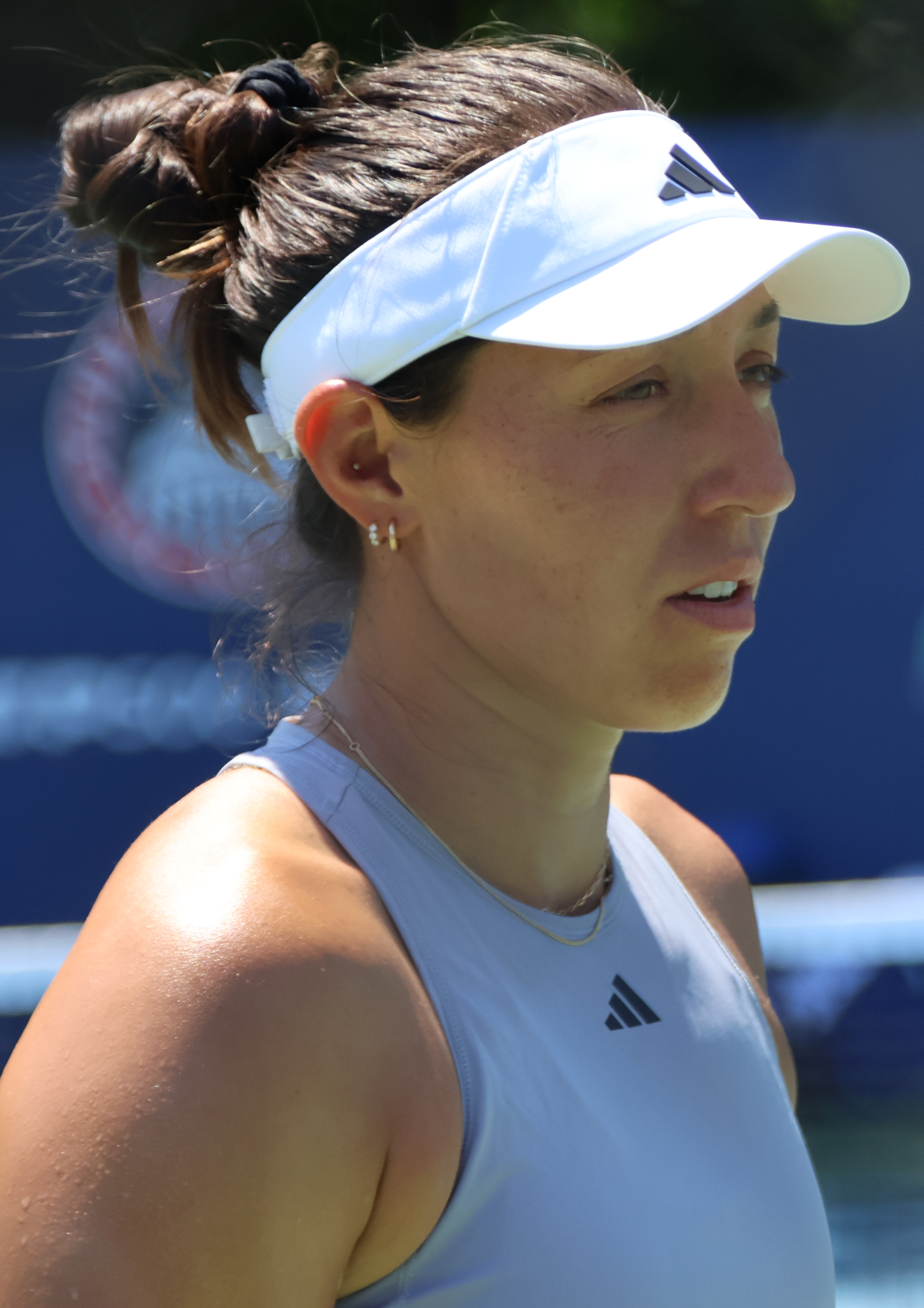
Pegula

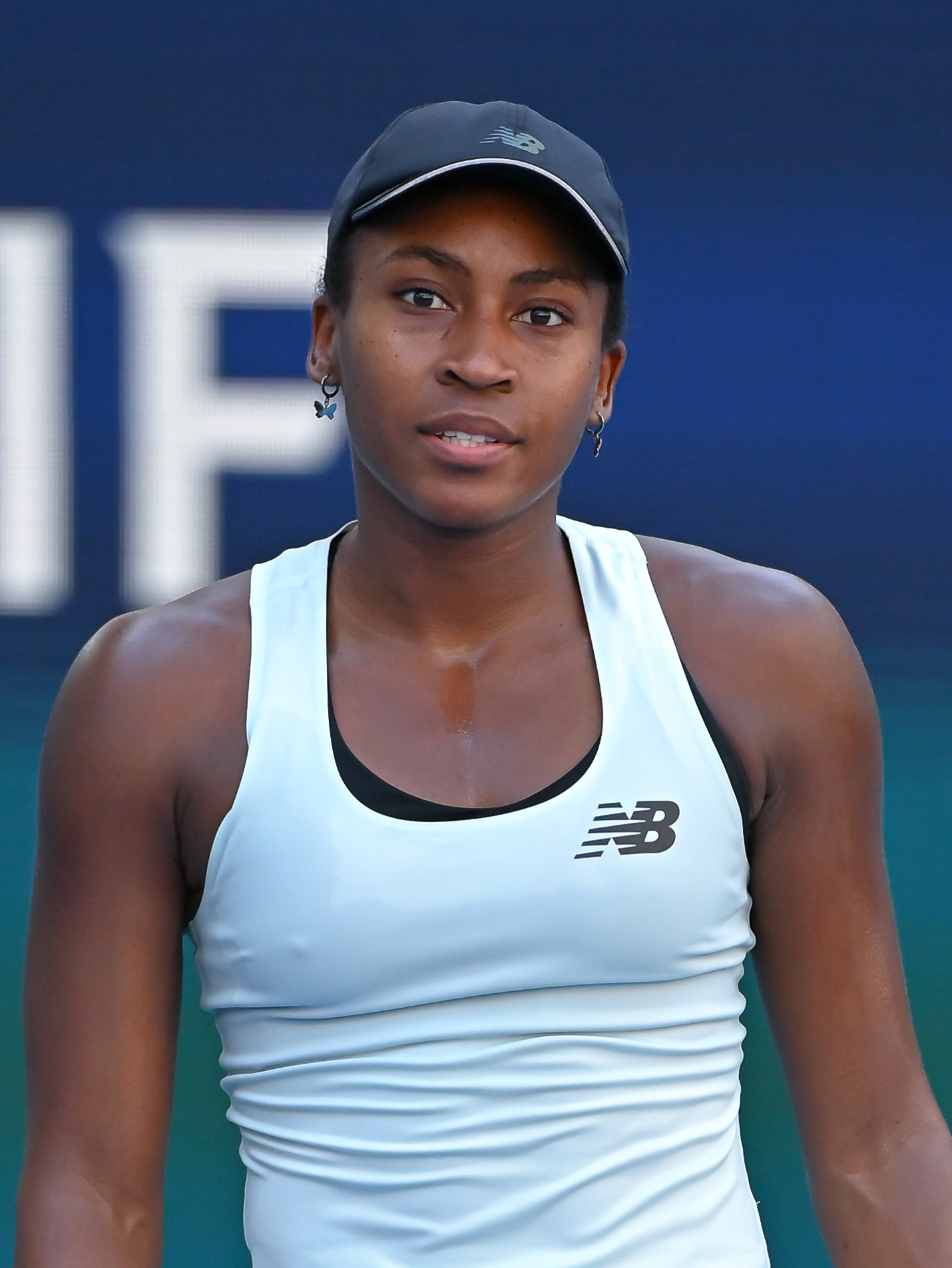
Gauff

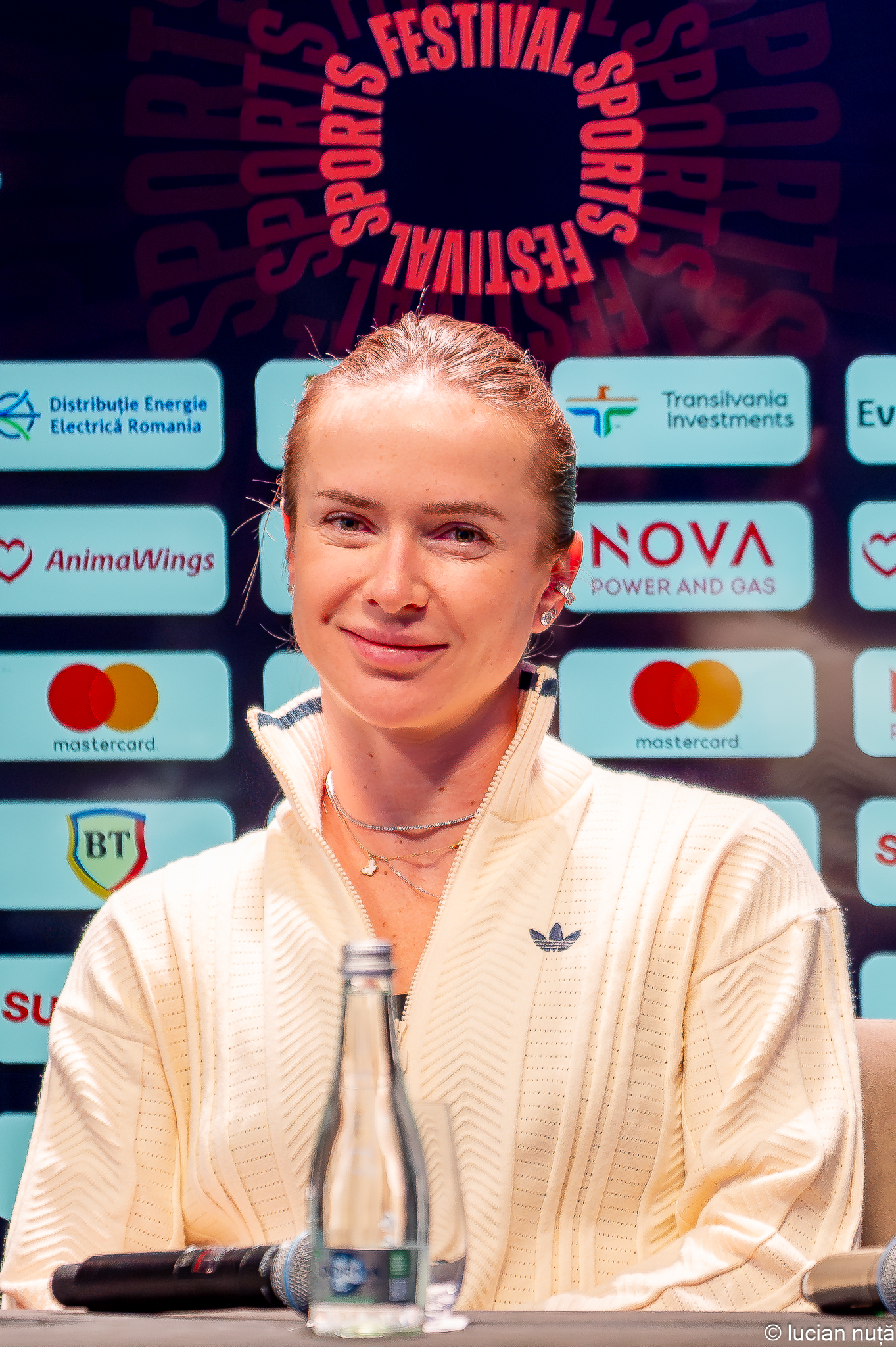
Svitolina

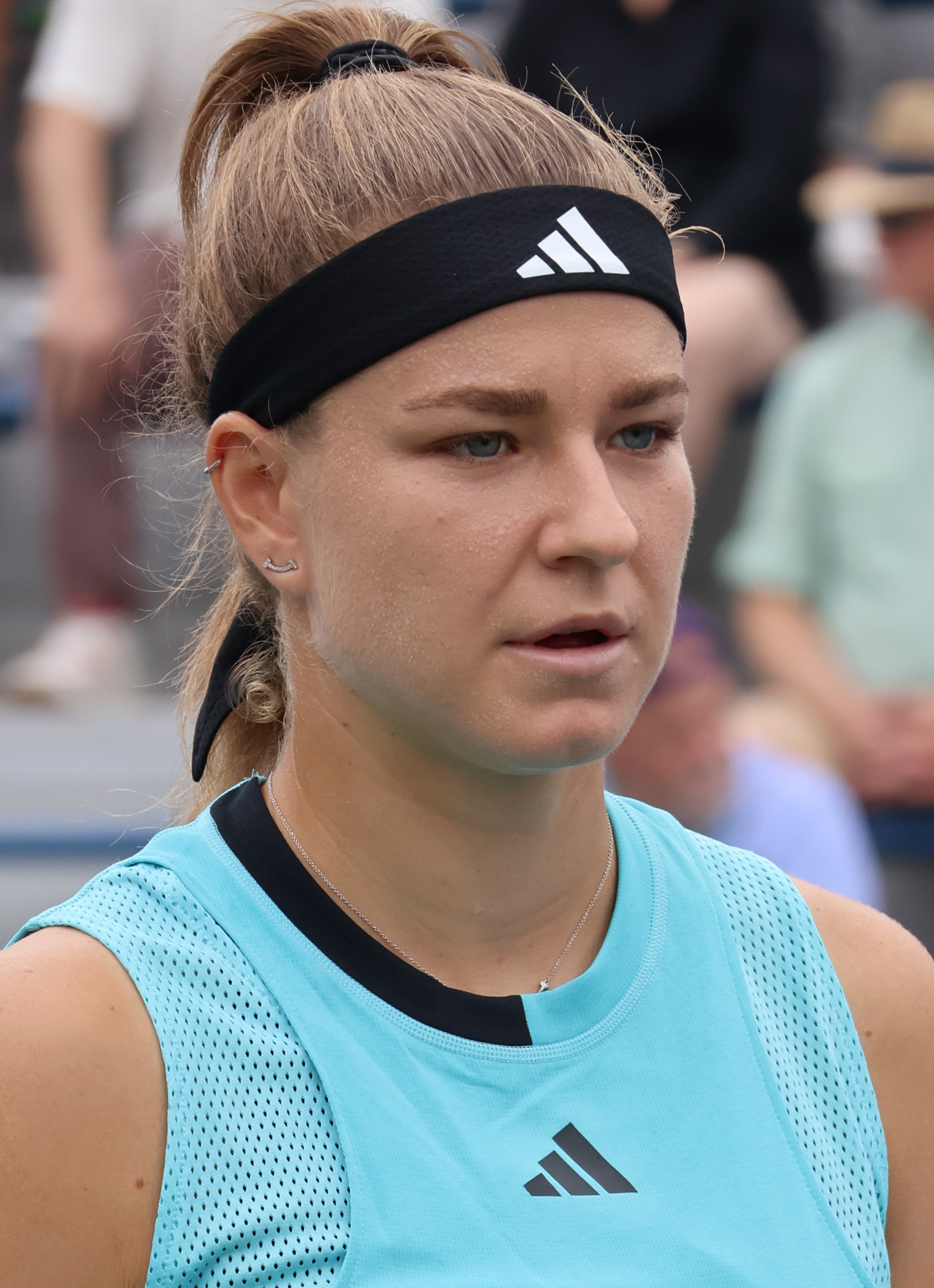
Muchová

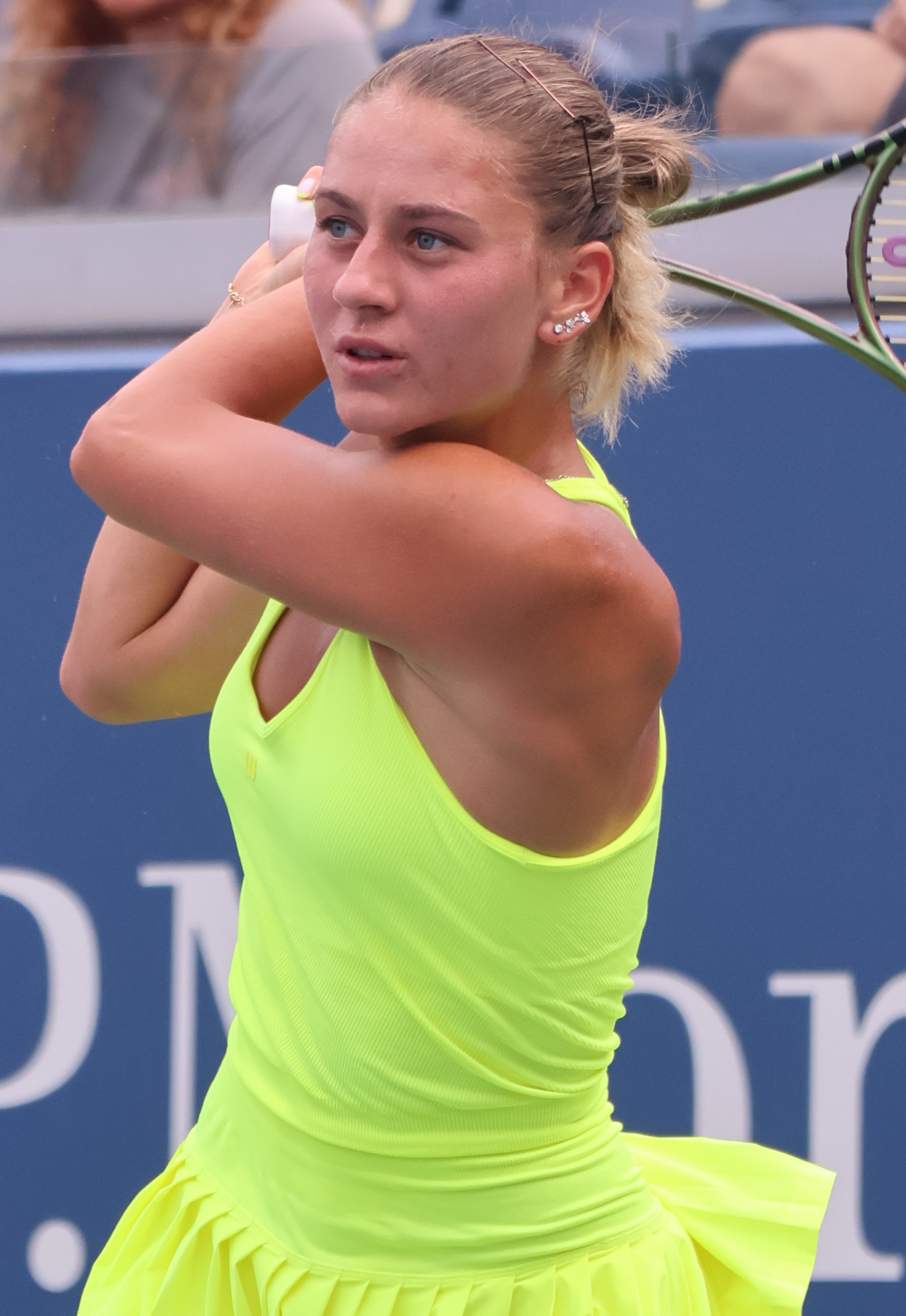
Kostyuk

#	Players	Date qualified
ill.	(Kazakhstan) Elena Rybakina	14 September
1	Aryna Sabalenka	29 September
2	Mirra Andreeva	9 October
3	(Czech Republic) Linda Nosková	9 October
4	(United States) Jessica Pegula	14 October
5	(United States) Coco Gauff	14 October
6	(Ukraine) Elina Svitolina	17 October
7	(Czech Republic) Karolína Muchová	21 October
8	(Ukraine) Marta Kostyuk	7 November

Player withdrew due to illness before the beginning of the event

=== Doubles ===
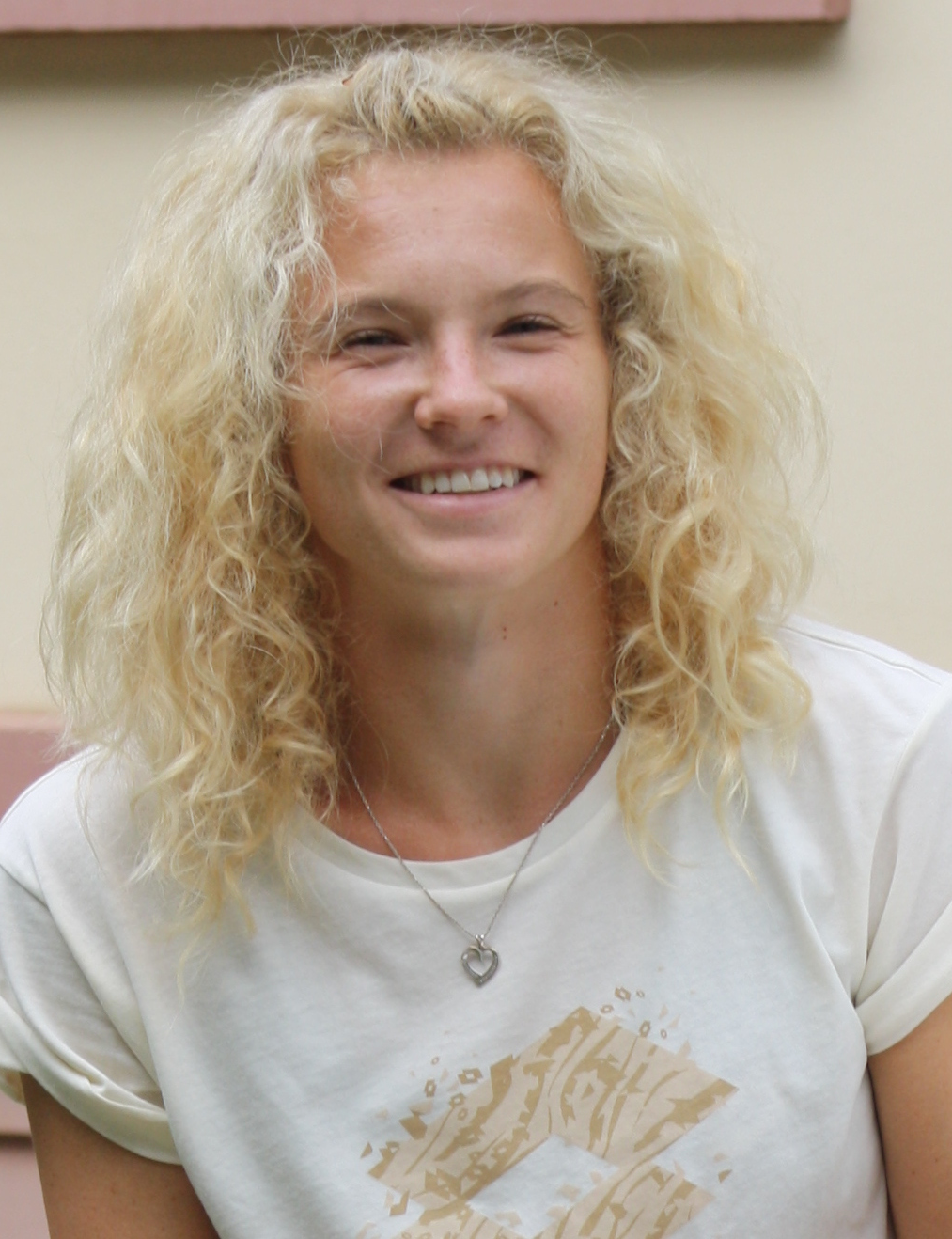
Siniaková

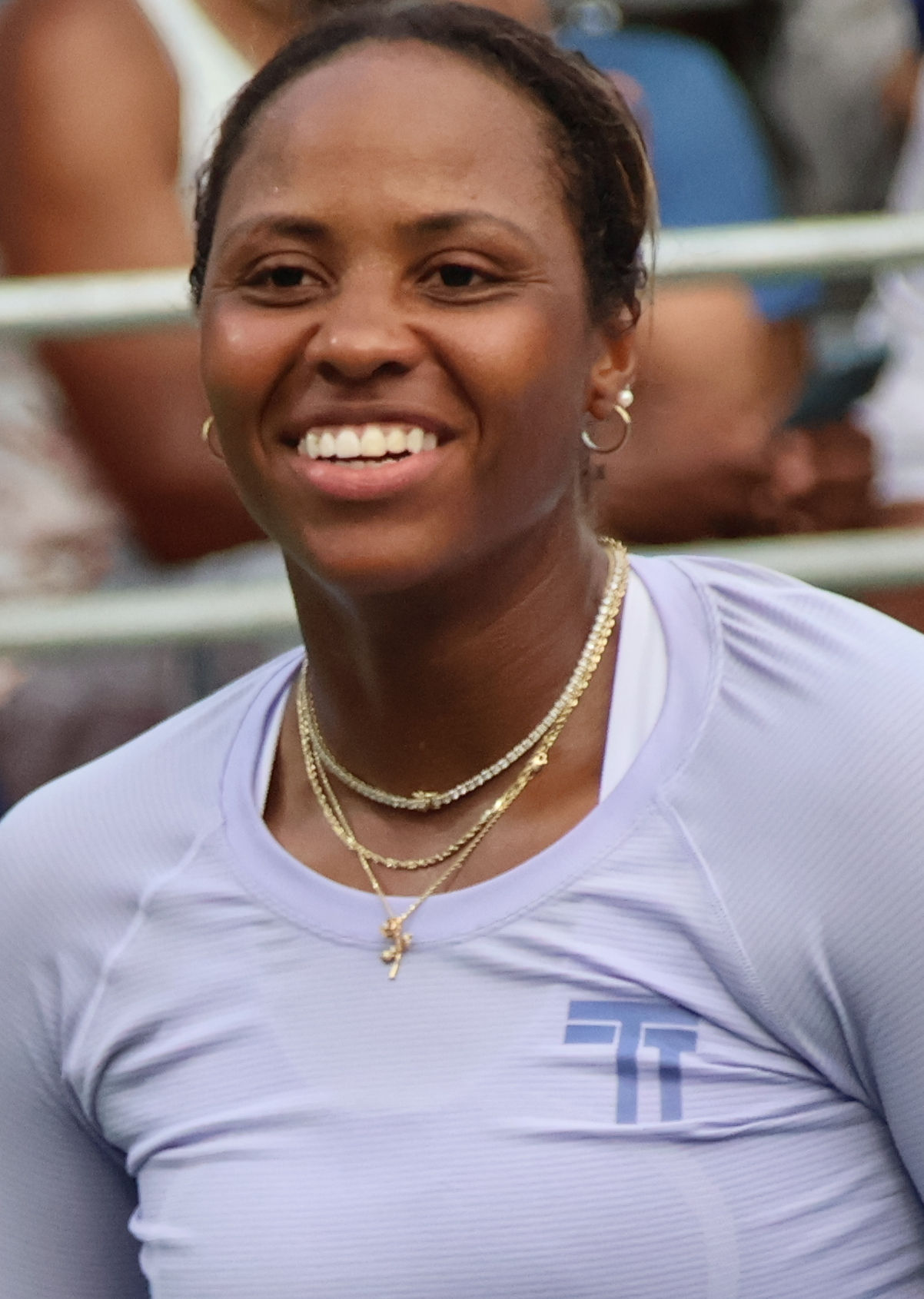
Townsend

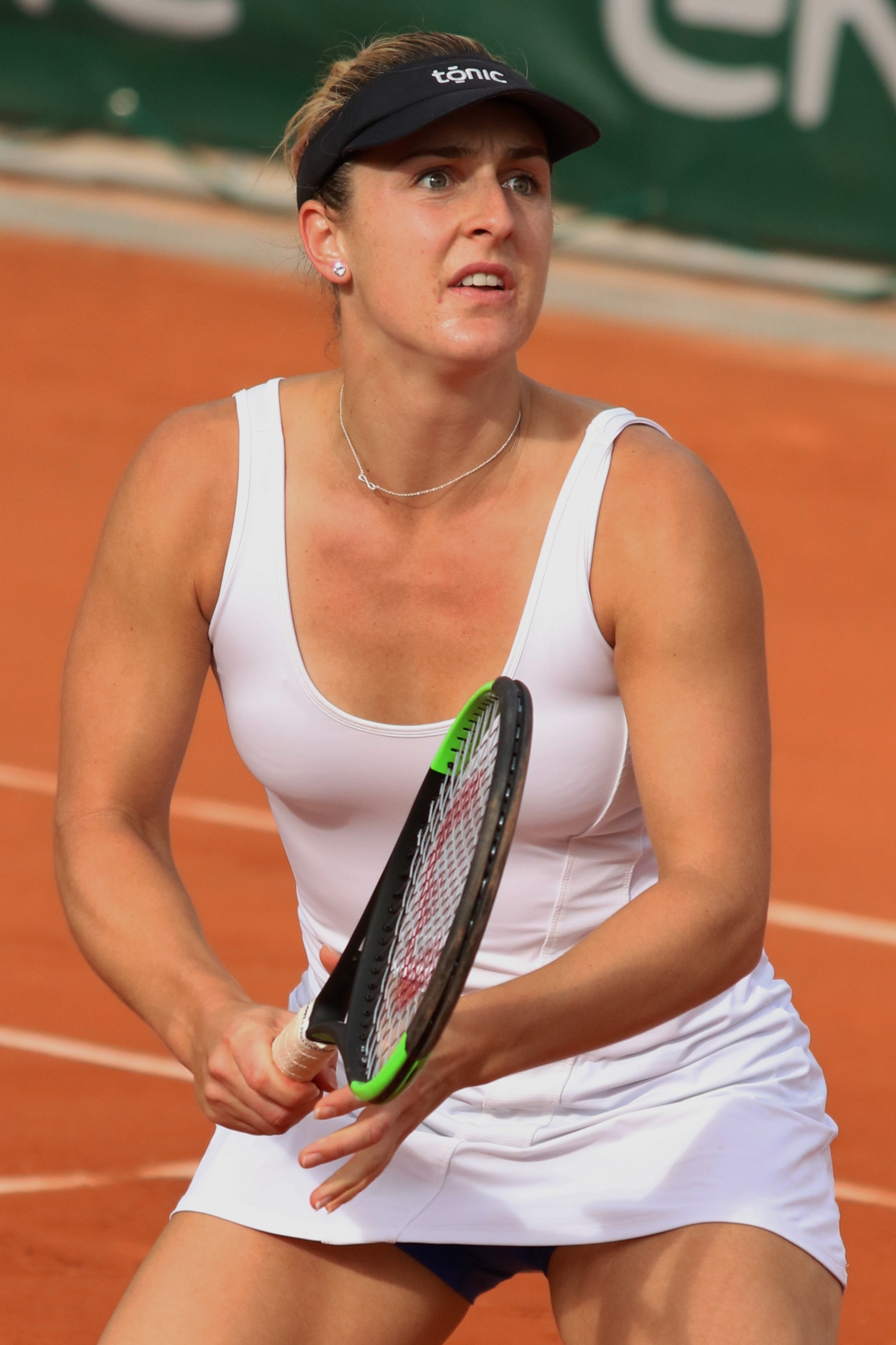
Dabrowski

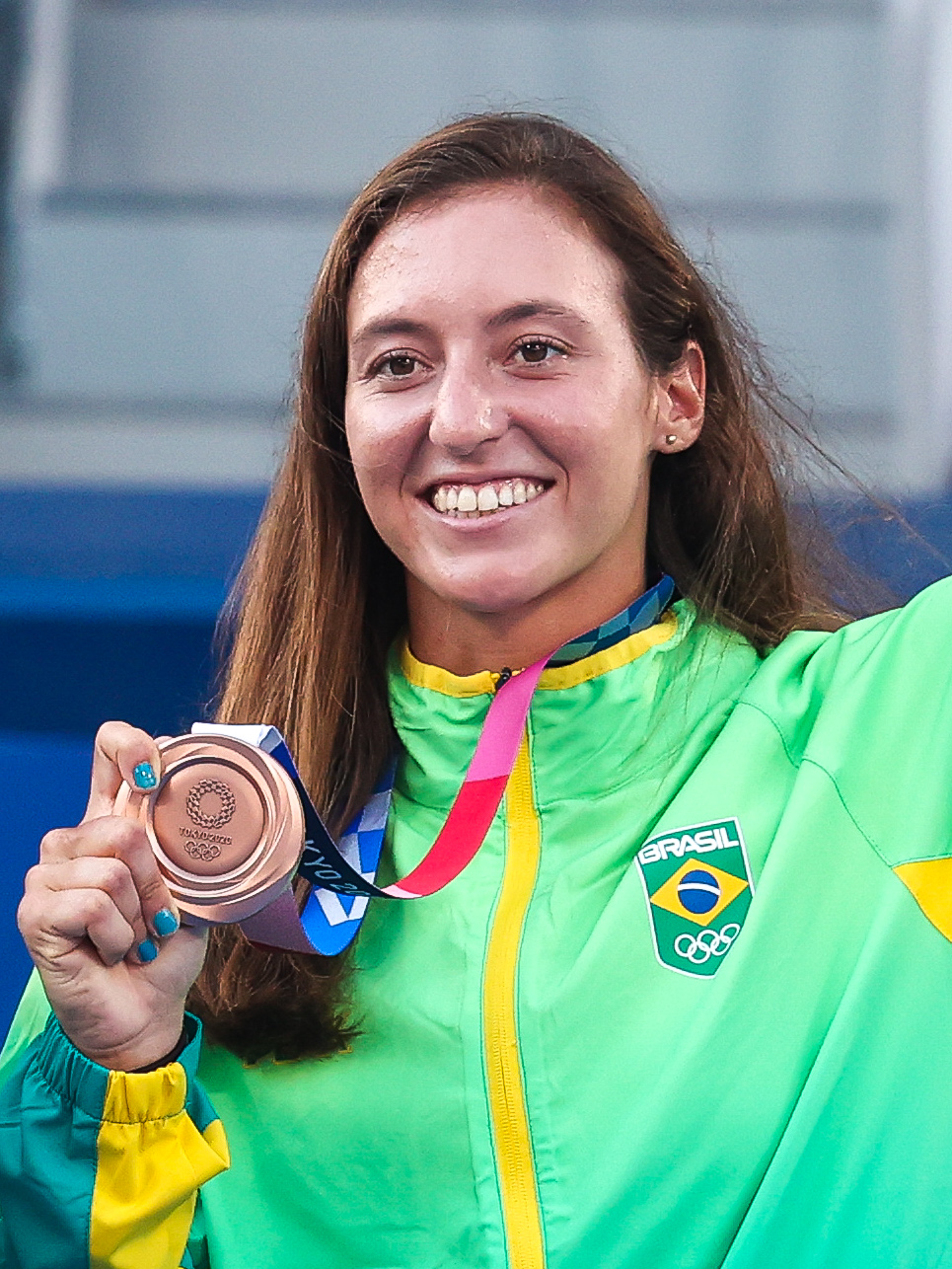
Stefani

Guo

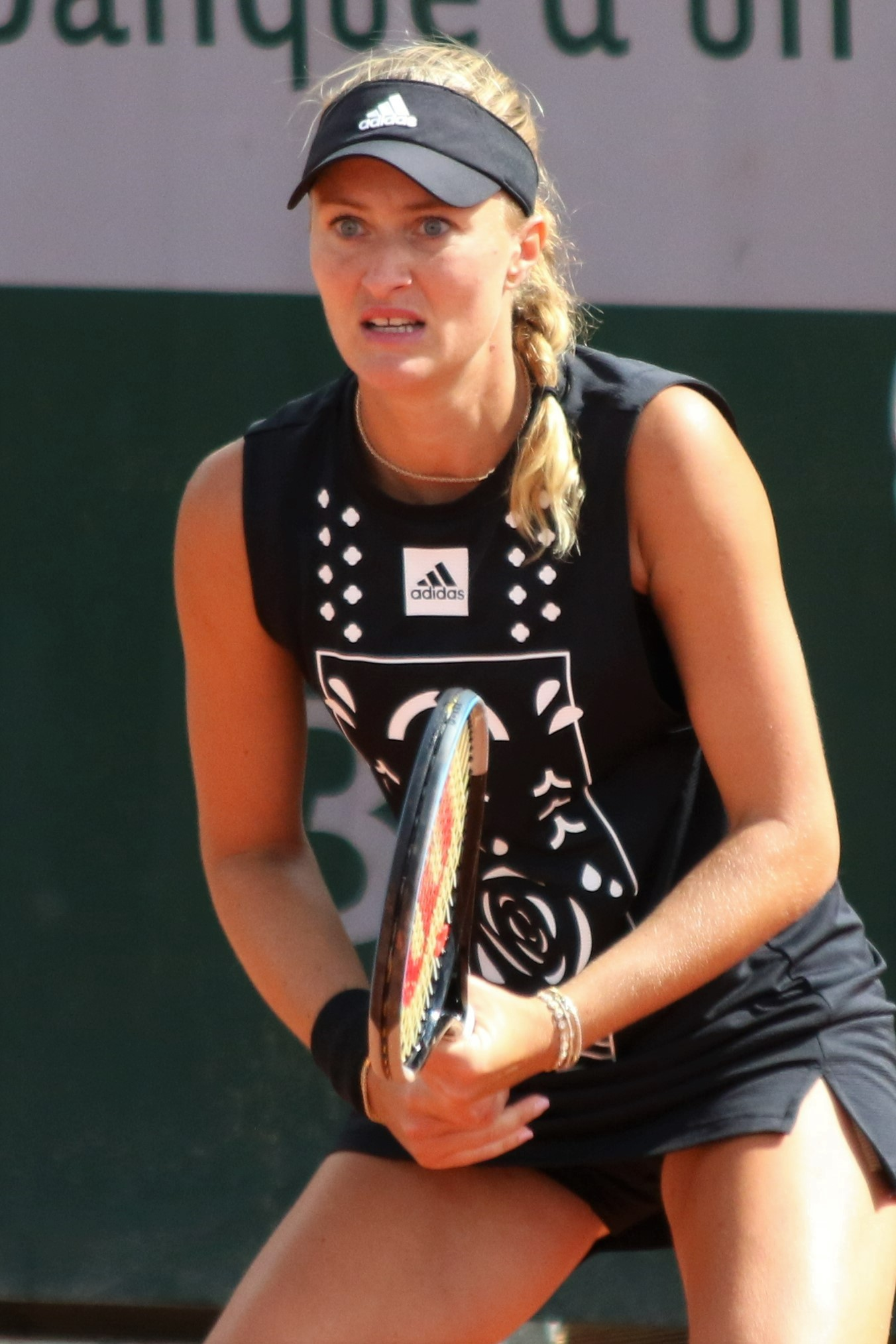
Mladenovic

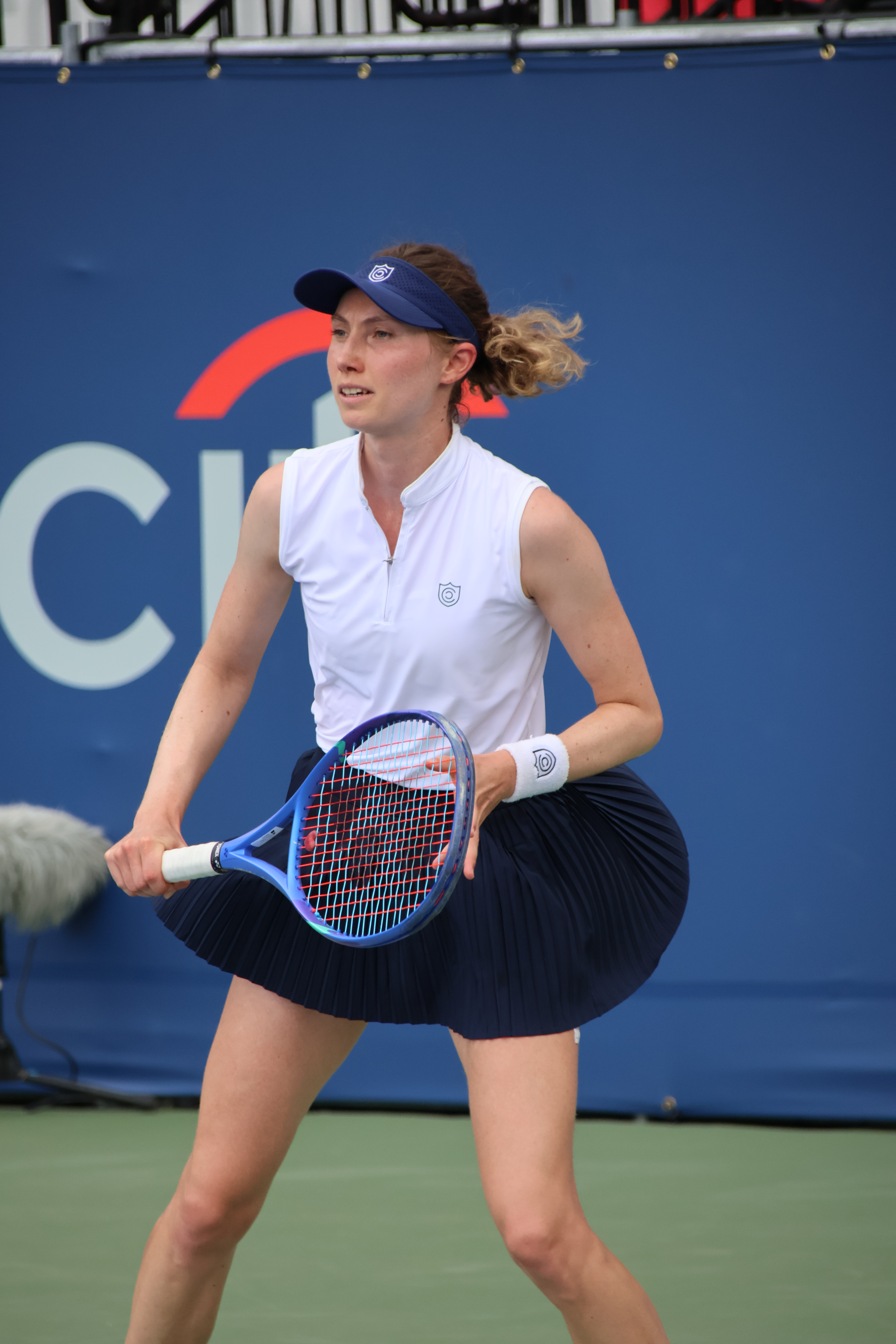
Bucșa

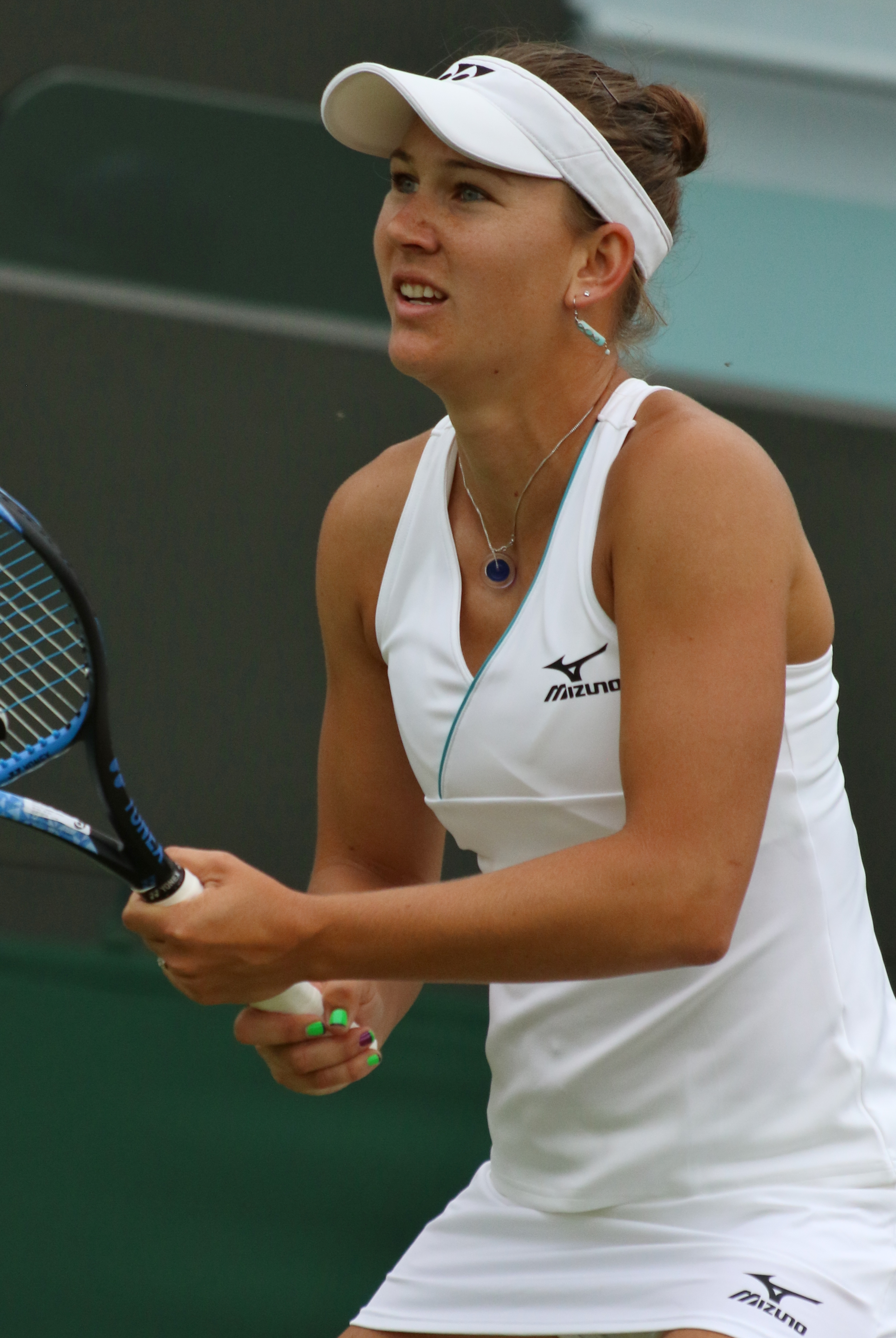
Melichar-Martinez

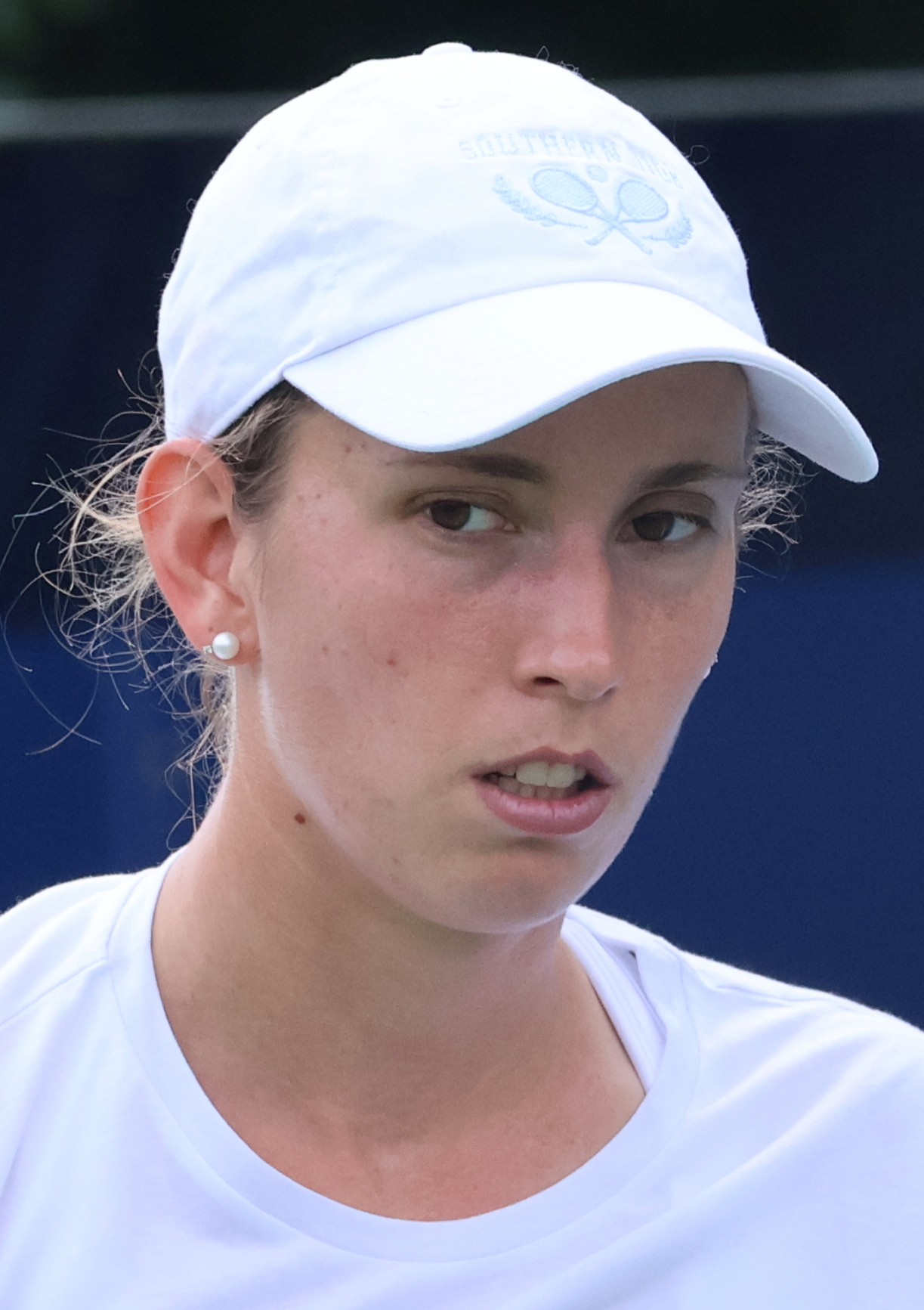
Mertens

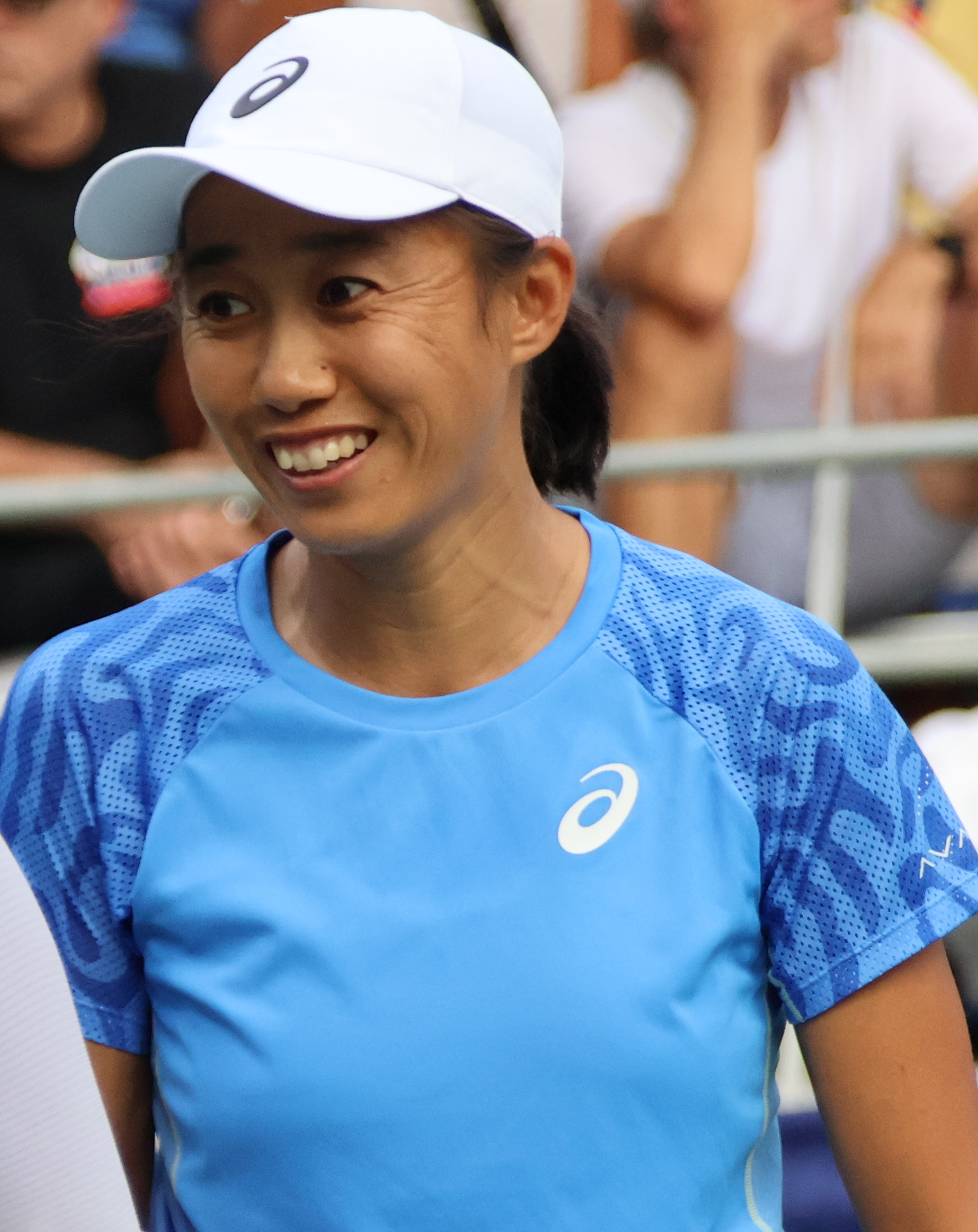
Zhang

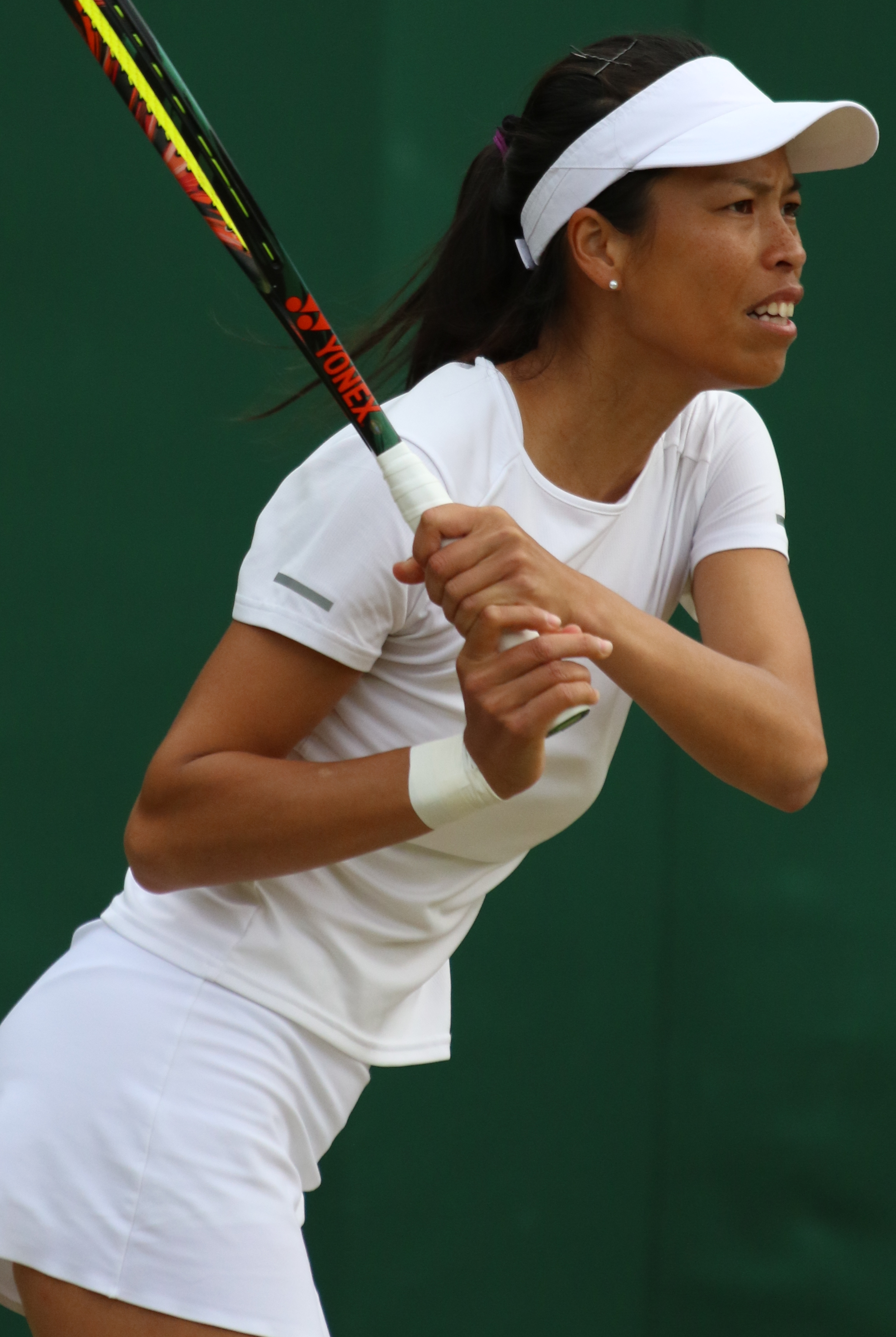
Hsieh

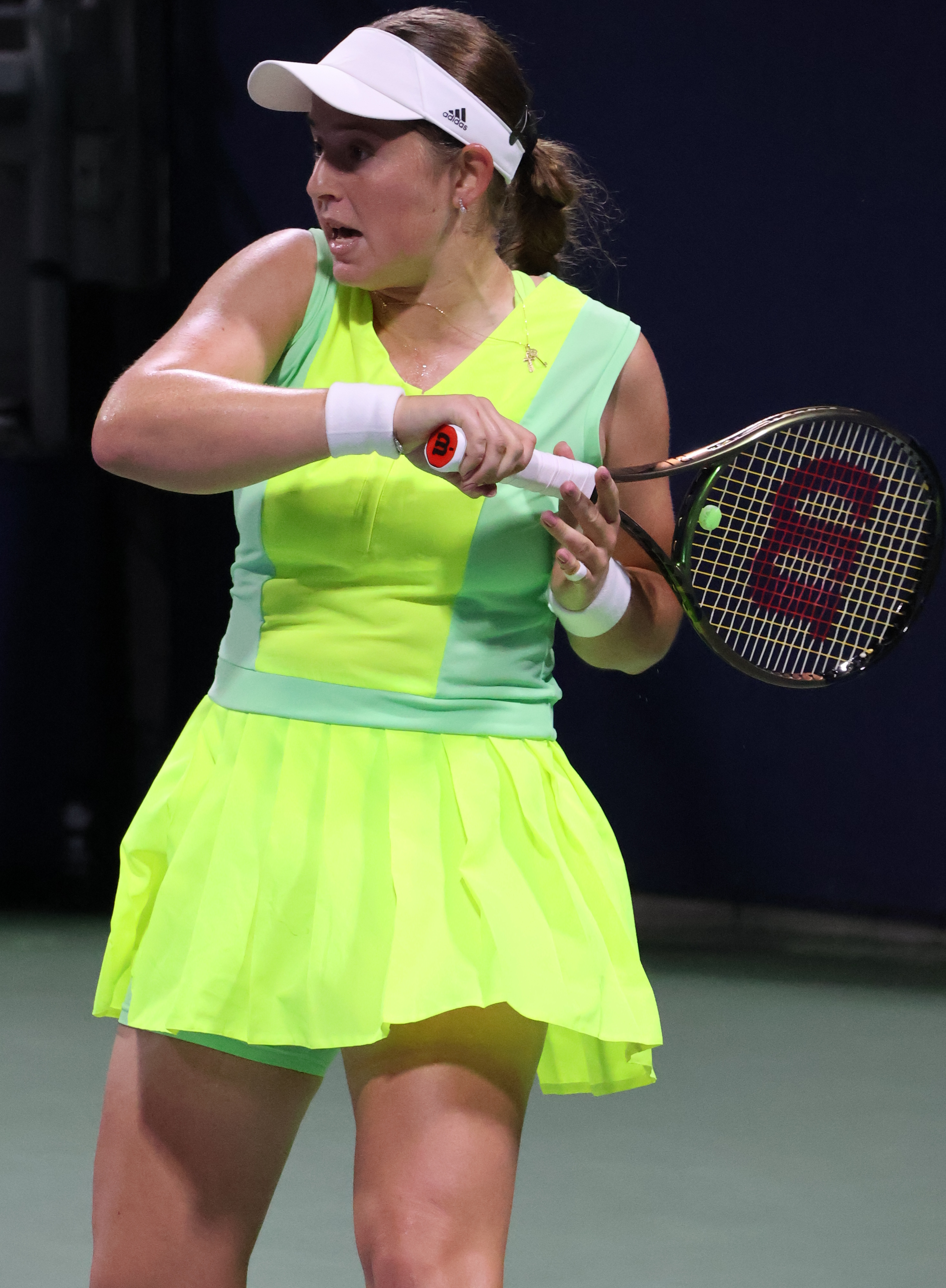
Ostapenko

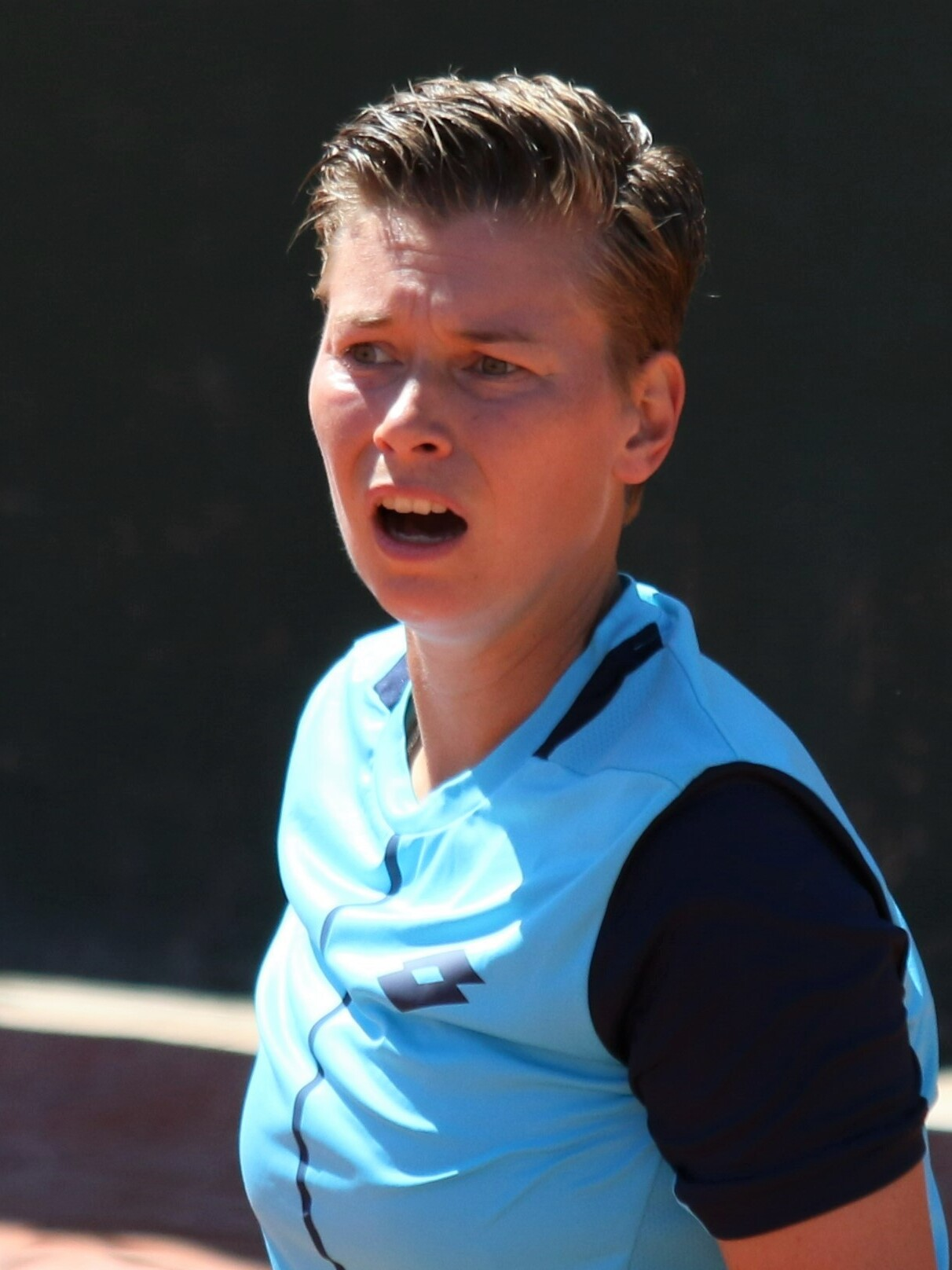
Schuurs

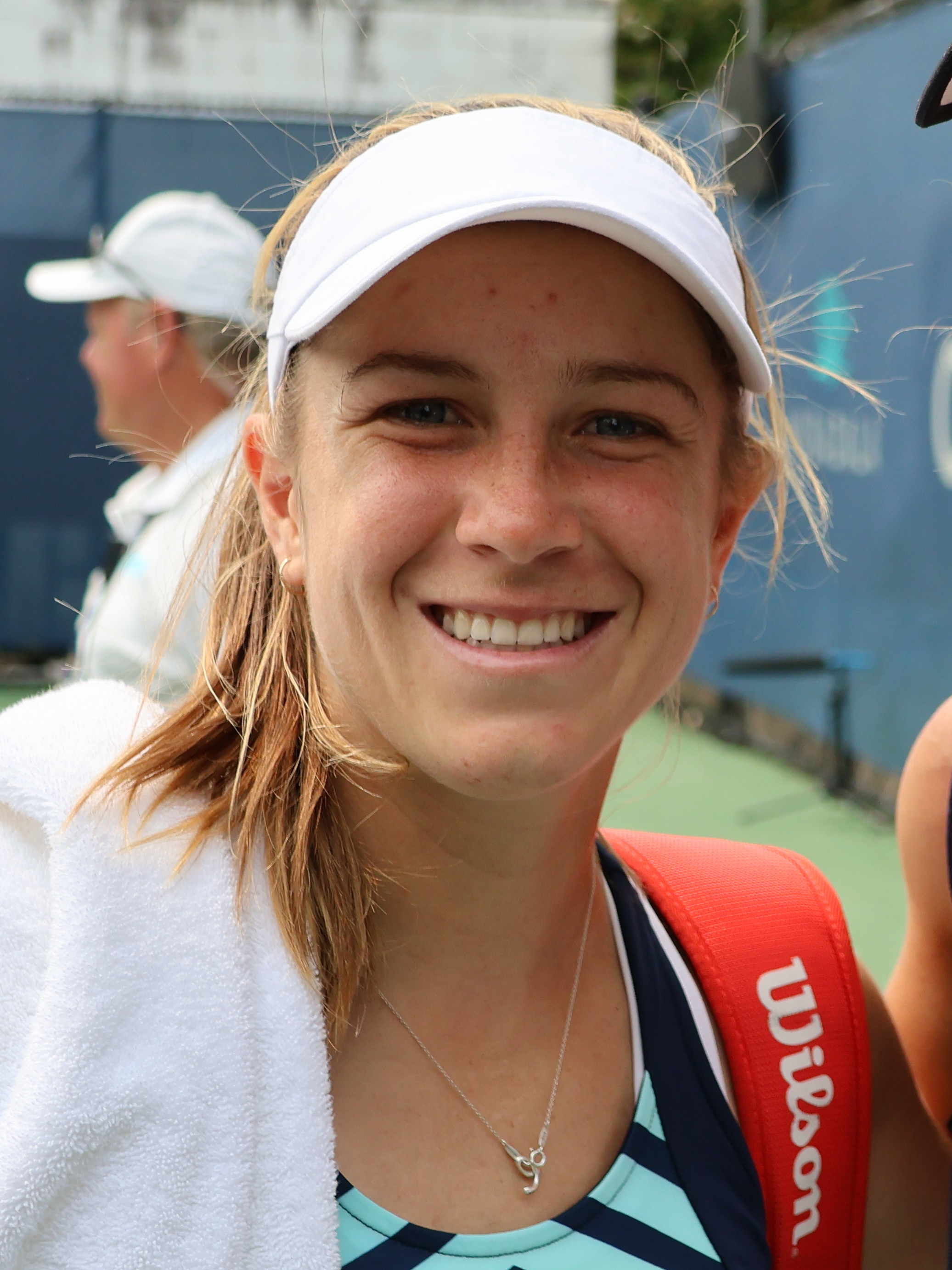
Perez

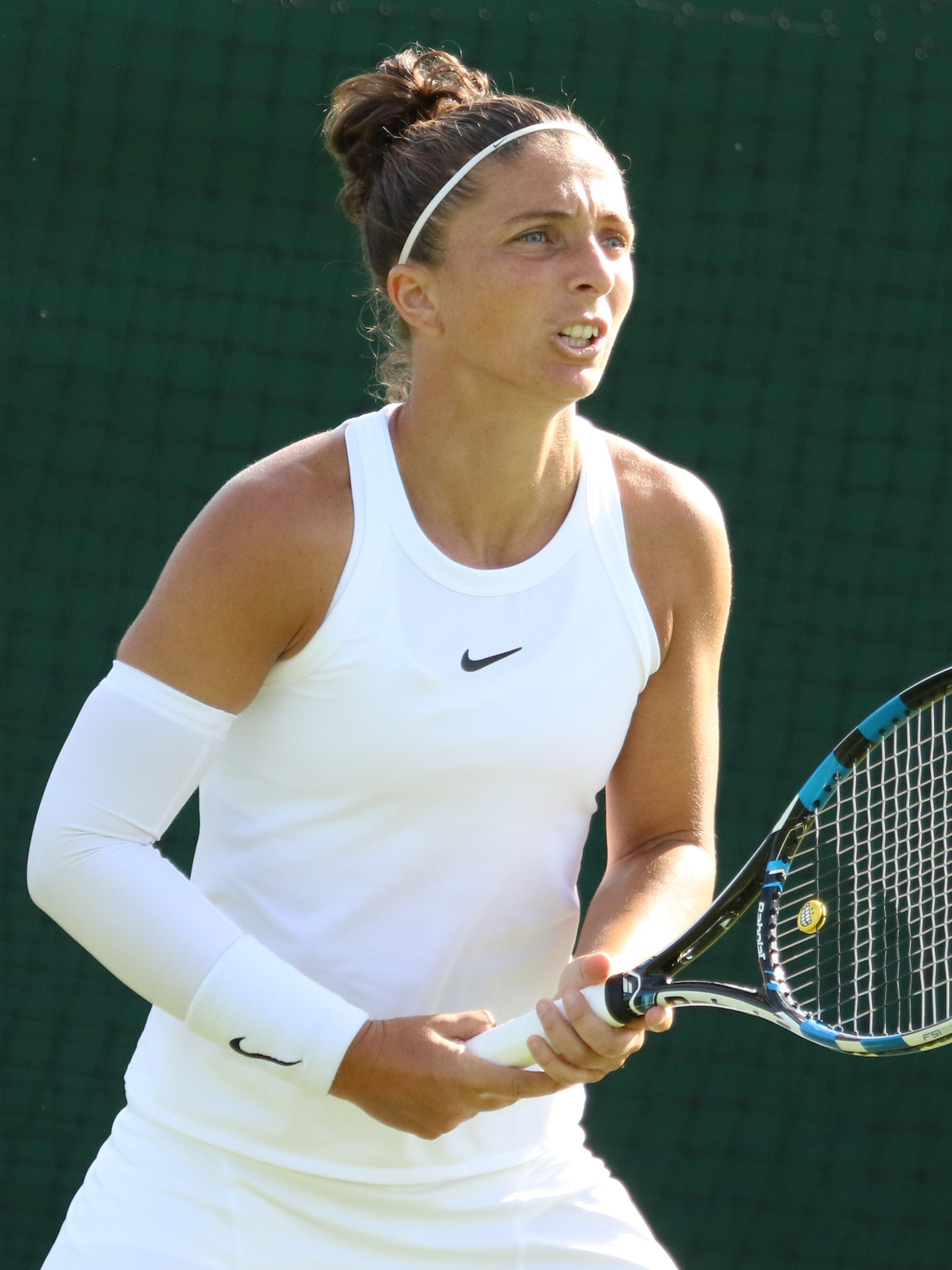
Errani

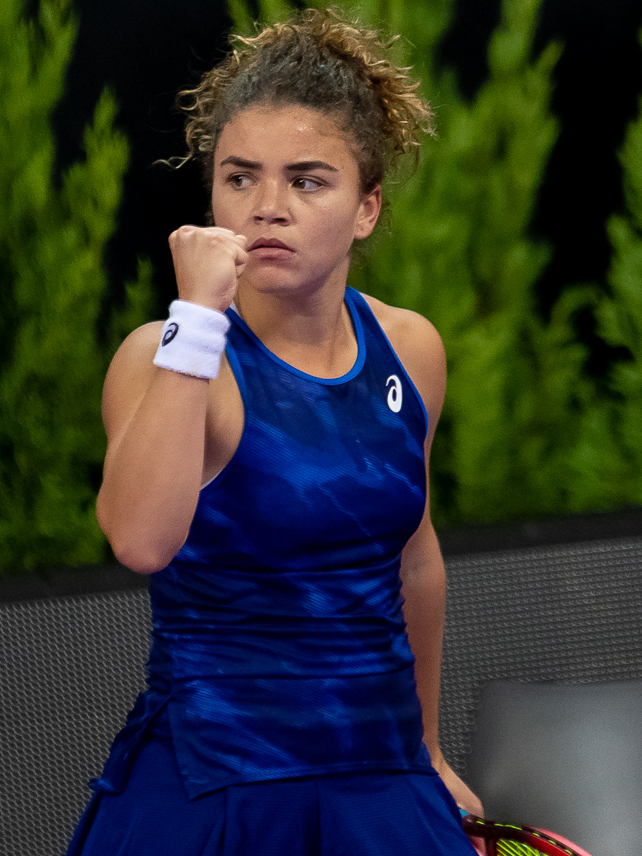
Paolini

#	Players	Date qualified
1	(Czech Republic) Kateřina Siniaková (United States) Taylor Townsend	24 August
2	(Canada) Gabriela Dabrowski (Brazil) Luisa Stefani	3 September
inj.	(Serbia) Aleksandra Krunic (Kazakhstan) Anna Danilina	3 September
3	(China) Guo Hanyu (France) Kristina Mladenovic	19 October
4	(Spain) Cristina Bucșa (United States) Nicole Melichar-Martinez	19 October
5	(Belgium) Elise Mertens (China) Zhang Shuai	19 October
6	(Chinese Taipei) Hsieh Su-wei (Latvia) Jeļena Ostapenko	21 October
7	(Netherlands) Demi Schuurs (Australia) Ellen Perez	21 October
8	(Italy) Sara Errani (Italy) Jasmine Paolini	31 October

Team withdrew due to injury before the beginning of the event

== Points breakdown ==
Key
W	F	SF	QF	#R	RR	Q#	DNQ	A	NH

(W) winner; (F) finalist; (SF) semifinalist; (QF) quarterfinalist; (#R) rounds 4, 3, 2, 1; (RR) round-robin stage; (Q#) qualification round; (DNQ) did not qualify; (A) absent; (NH) not held; (SR) strike rate (events won / competed); (W–L) win–loss record.
To avoid confusion and double counting, these charts are updated at the conclusion of a tournament or when the player's participation has ended.

=== Singles ===
† Player qualified for the WTA Finals.
^{x} Player withdrew due to injury or illness
^{*} Player qualified as alternate but chose not to play

Rank	Player	Grand Slam				WTA 1000 (Note: 0-point penalties were applied for every WTA 1000 in which players had or would have been accepted into the main draw but were absent and if players fail to fulfill their WTA 500 tournaments commitment obligations. These cases are marked with P.)							Best other							Total points	Tourn	Titles
Rank	Player	Grand Slam				Best combined						WTA only	Best other							Total points	Tourn	Titles
Rank	Player	AUS	FRA	WIM	USO	1	2	3	4	5	6	WTA only	1	2	3	4	5	6	7	Total points	Tourn	Titles
1^{x}	(Kazakhstan) Elena Rybakina	W 2000	R64; 70	R32; 130	W 2000	F 650	F 650	SF; 390	QF; 215	QF; 215	R16; 120	QF; 215	W 500	W 500	R16; 120	QF; 108	QF; 108	QF; 108	P 0	8,099	19	4
2^{†}	Aryna Sabalenka	F 1300	QF; 430	R16; 240	F 1300	W 1000	W 1000	QF; 215	R16; 120	R16; 120	R32; 65	P 0	W 500	SF; 195	P 0					6,485	14	3
3^{†}	Mirra Andreeva	R16; 240	W 2000	R64; 70	QF; 430	F 650	F 650	QF; 215	R16; 120	R16; 120	R32; 65	QF; 215	W 500	W 500	SF; 195	R16; 120	QF; 108	QF; 108	P 0	6,306	19	3
4^{†}	(United States) Coco Gauff	QF; 430	R32; 130	SF; 780	SF; 780	W 1000	F 650	F 650	SF; 390	R16; 120	R16; 120	SF; 390	SF; 150	QF; 108	R32; 65	P 0	P 0			5,763	16	1
5^{†}	(United States) Jessica Pegula	SF; 780	R128; 10	QF; 430	SF; 780	F 650	QF; 215	QF; 215	QF; 215	R16; 120	P 0	W 1000	W 500	F 325	F 325	SF; 195	P 0			5,760	16	2
6^{†}	(Ukraine) Elina Svitolina	SF; 780	QF; 430	R128; 10	R32; 130	W 1000	SF; 390	SF; 390	QF; 215	R32; 65	R32; 65	F 650	W 250	QF; 215	SF; 195	R16; 120	QF; 108	QF; 108	P 0	5,121	19	2
7^{†}	(Czech Republic) Karolína Muchová	R16; 240	R32; 130	F 1300	R32; 130	SF; 390	QF; 215	R16; 120	P 0	A 0	A 0	W 1000	W 500	F 325	SF; 195	R16; 120	P 0			4,665	14	2
8^{†}	(Czech Republic) Linda Nosková	R32; 130	R128; 10	W 2000	QF; 430	SF; 390	QF; 215	R16; 120	R16; 120	R16; 120	R64; 10	R32; 65	W 500	QF; 108	R32; 65	R16; 60	P 0	P 0		4,343	17	2
-^{x}	(Poland) Iga Świątek	QF; 430	R16; 240	R32; 130	R16; 240	W 1000	SF; 390	SF; 390	QF; 215	QF; 215	R32; 65	SF; 390	QF; 215	W 150	QF; 108	R64; 10	P 0			4,188	16	1
9^{†}	(Ukraine) Marta Kostyuk	R128; 10	SF; 780	SF; 780	R16; 240	W 1000	QF; 215	R16; 120	R32; 65	R32; 65	A 0	P 0	F 325	W 250	QF; 60	P 0				3,910	14	2
Alternates
10	Diana Shnaider	R32; 130	SF; 780	R64; 70	R32; 130	QF; 215	R16; 120	R32; 65	R32; 65	R32; 65	R32; 65	QF; 215	W 500	SF; 195	SF; 195	SF; 195	QF; 108	R32; 65	R16; 60	3,238	22	1
11^{*}	(United States) Iva Jovic	QF; 430	R32; 130	R16; 240	R16; 240	R16; 120	R16; 120	R32; 65	R32; 65	R32; 65	R32; 65	R16; 120	W 500	SF; 195	SF; 195	F 163	R16; 120	QF; 108	P 0	2,941	22	1

=== Doubles ===
† Team qualified for the WTA Finals.
^{x} Team withdrew due to injury

Rank	Team	Points												Total points	Tourn	Titles
Rank	Team	1	2	3	4	5	6	7	8	9	10	11	12	Total points	Tourn	Titles
1^{†}	(Canada) Gabriela Dabrowski (Brazil) Luisa Stefani	F 1300	W 1000	W 1000	W 1000	SF; 780	SF; 780	SF; 780	W 500	SF; 390	SF; 390	F 325	W 250	8,495	16	6
2^{†}	(Czech Republic) Kateřina Siniaková (United States) Taylor Townsend	W 2000	W 2000	W 1000	W 1000	W 1000	QF; 430	QF; 430	SF; 390	R16; 120				8,370	9	5
–^{x}	(Kazakhstan) Anna Danilina (Serbia) Aleksandra Krunić	F 1300	F 1300	W 1000	F 650	SF; 390	R16; 240	SF; 195	SF; 195	R32; 130	R16; 120	QF; 108	R32; 10	5,638	14	1
3^{†}	(China) Guo Hanyu (France) Kristina Mladenovic	W 2000	QF; 430	W 250	R16; 240	QF; 215	QF; 215	QF; 215	SF; 195	SF; 195	R64; 10	R32; 10	R16; 1	3,976	12	2
4^{†}	(Spain) Cristina Bucșa (United States) Nicole Melichar-Martinez	F 650	W 500	QF; 430	SF; 390	SF; 390	F 325	R16; 240	R16; 240	QF; 215	R16; 120	R16; 120	R16; 120	3,740	16	1
5^{†}	(Chinese Taipei) Hsieh Su-wei (Latvia) Jeļena Ostapenko	F 650	W 500	QF; 430	QF; 430	SF; 390	SF; 390	QF; 215	QF; 215	QF; 108				3,328	9	1
6^{†}	(Australia) Ellen Perez (Netherlands) Demi Schuurs	QF; 430	QF; 430	F 325	R16; 240	R16; 240	QF; 215	QF; 215	QF; 215	QF; 215	QF; 215	SF; 195	SF; 195	3,130	22	0
7^{†}	(Belgium) Elise Mertens (China) Zhang Shuai	W 2000	SF; 390	R16; 240	R32; 130	R16; 120	QF; 108	R16; 10	R32; 10	R32; 10				3,018	9	1
8^{†}	(Italy) Sara Errani (Italy) Jasmine Paolini	F 650	W 500	SF; 390	SF; 390	SF; 390	QF; 215	R32; 130	R16; 120	R16; 120	R16; 10	R16; 1	R16; 1	2,917	12	1
Alternates
9	(Slovakia) Tereza Mihalíková (United Kingdom) Olivia Nicholls	W 500	SF; 390	F 325	R16; 240	QF; 215	SF; 195	SF; 195	R32; 130	R16; 120	R16; 120	R16; 120	R64; 10	2,560	24	1
10	(New Zealand) Erin Routliffe (Indonesia) Aldila Sutjiadi	W 500	W 500	QF; 430	SF; 390	QF; 215	R16; 120	QF; 108	R32; 10	R16; 1				2,274	9	2

== Head-to-head records ==
Below are the singles head-to-head records as they approached the tournament.

		Rybakina	Sabalenka	Andreeva	Pegula	Gauff	Svitolina	Muchová	Nosková	Overall	YTD W–L
1	(Kazakhstan) Elena Rybakina		8–10	2–2	6–3	2–1	4–4	2–2	3–0	27–22	54–14
2	Aryna Sabalenka	10–8		4–2	10–4	7–6	6–1	2–3	3–0	42–24	47–10
3	Mirra Andreeva	2–2	2–4		0–0	0–6	1–1	1–0	4–2	10–15	50–16
4	(United States) Jessica Pegula	3–6	4–10	0–0		5–5	6–3	2–0	1–3	21–27	50–13
5	(United States) Coco Gauff	1–2	6–7	6–0	5–5		2–4	6–2	2–1	28–21	47–15
6	(Ukraine) Elina Svitolina	4–4	1–6	1–1	3–6	4–2		3–1	1–2	17–22	46–14
7	(Czech Republic) Karolína Muchová	2–2	3–2	0–1	0–2	2–6	1–3		1–1	9–17	41–12
8	(Czech Republic) Linda Nosková	0–3	0–3	2–4	3–1	1–2	2–1	1–1		9–15	35–15

== See also ==
- WTA rankings
- 2026 WTA Tour
- 2026 ATP Finals
