= 2026 Toray Pan Pacific Open =

- Date: 26 October–1 November
- Edition: 52nd
- Category: WTA 500
- Draw: 28S / 16D
- Prize money: $1,206,446
- Surface: Hard / outdoor
- Location: Tokyo, Japan
- Venue: Ariake Coliseum

Champions

Singles
- Diana Shnaider

Doubles
- (Italy) Sara Errani / (Italy) Jasmine Paolini
- Pan Pacific Open

The 2026 Toray Pan Pacific Open was a professional women's tennis tournament played on outdoor hard courts. It was the 52nd edition of the Pan Pacific Open, and part of the WTA 500 tournaments of the 2026 WTA Tour. It took place at the Ariake Coliseum in Tokyo, Japan from 26 October to 1 November 2026.

== Champions ==
=== Singles ===
- Diana Shnaider def. (Canada) Leylah Fernandez, 6–4, 5–7, 6–2

=== Doubles ===
- (Italy) Sara Errani / (Italy) Jasmine Paolini def. (Canada) Gabriela Dabrowski / (Brazil) Luisa Stefani, 6–2, 6–2

== Singles main draw entrants ==
=== Seeds ===
Country	Player	Rank	Seeds
KAZ	Elena Rybakina	1	1
~~POL~~	~~Maja Chwalińska~~	~~11~~	~~2~~
	Diana Shnaider	13	3
~~SUI~~	~~Belinda Bencic~~	~~14~~	~~4~~
BEL	Elise Mertens	15	5
ROU	Sorana Cîrstea	17	6
JPN	Naomi Osaka	19	7
PHI	Alexandra Eala	20	8

- Rankings are as of 19 October 2026

=== Other entrants ===
The following players received wildcards into the singles draw:

- (Slovakia) Mia Pohánková
- (Japan) Himeno Sakatsume
- (United Kingdom) Mika Stojsavljevic
- (Japan) Moyuka Uchijima

The following players received entry from the qualifying draw:

- (Australia) Maya Joint
- (Australia) Daria Kasatkina
- (United States) Alycia Parks
- (Kazakhstan) Yulia Putintseva
- Aliaksandra Sasnovich
- (Czech Republic) Tereza Valentová

The following players received entry as lucky losers:

- (Australia) Kimberly Birrell
- (Uzbekistan) Kamilla Rakhimova

=== Withdrawals ===
- (Switzerland) Belinda Bencic → replaced by (Uzbekistan) Kamilla Rakhimova (LL)
- (Poland) Maja Chwalińska → replaced by (Australia) Kimberly Birrell (LL)
- (United States) Iva Jovic → replaced by (China) Wang Xinyu
- Anna Kalinskaya → replaced by (France) Diane Parry
- (Ukraine) Marta Kostyuk → replaced by (Spain) Cristina Bucșa
- (United States) Jessica Pegula → replaced by (United States) Ann Li
- (Ukraine) Elina Svitolina → replaced by (United States) Peyton Stearns
- (Poland) Iga Świątek → replaced by (Czech Republic) Nikola Bartůňková

== Doubles main draw entrants ==
=== Seeds ===
Country	Player	Country	Player	Rank^{1}	Seed
CAN	Gabriela Dabrowski	BRA	Luisa Stefani	7	1
KAZ	Anna Danilina	CHN	Jiang Xinyu	33	2
NZL	Erin Routliffe	INA	Aldila Sutjiadi	39	3
AUS	Ellen Perez	NED	Demi Schuurs	42	4

- Rankings are as of 19 October 2026

=== Other entrants ===
The following pair received a wildcard into the doubles main draw:

- (Japan) Momoko Kobori / (Japan) Ayano Shimizu

The following pairs received entry as alternates:

- (Japan) Mana Ayukawa / (United Kingdom) Emily Webley-Smith
- (Kazakhstan) Yulia Putintseva / Liudmila Samsonova

=== Withdrawals ===
- (Spain) Cristina Bucșa / (Canada) Leylah Fernandez → replaced by (Japan) Mana Ayukawa / (United Kingdom) Emily Webley-Smith
- (Philippines) Alexandra Eala / (United States) Desirae Krawczyk → replaced by (Kazakhstan) Yulia Putintseva / Liudmila Samsonova
