= 2026 Ningbo Open =

- Date: 19–25 October
- Edition: 9th
- Category: WTA 500
- Draw: 28S / 16D
- Prize money: $1,206,446
- Surface: Hard / outdoor
- Location: Ningbo, China
- Venue: Ningbo Yinzhou Tennis Center

Champions

Singles
- (Kazakhstan) Elena Rybakina

Doubles
- (United States) Desirae Krawczyk / (Hungary) Fanny Stollár
- Ningbo Open

The 2026 Ningbo Open (also known as the BNB Ningbo Open for sponsorship reasons) was a professional tennis tournament played on outdoor hardcourts. It was the 9th edition of the Ningbo Open and a WTA 500 tournament on the 2026 WTA Tour. It took place at the Yinzhou Tennis Center in Ningbo, China, from 19 to 25 October 2026.

== Champions ==
=== Singles ===
- (Kazakhstan) Elena Rybakina def. (Canada) Leylah Fernandez, 6–2, 6–2

=== Doubles ===
- (United States) Desirae Krawczyk / (Hungary) Fanny Stollár def. (Spain) Cristina Bucșa / (United States) Nicole Melichar-Martinez 7–6^{(7–5)}, 5–7, [10–6]

== Singles main-draw entrants ==
=== Seeds ===
Country	Player	Rank^{1}	Seed
KAZ	Elena Rybakina	1	1
~~POL~~	~~Iga Świątek~~	~~9~~	~~2~~
UKR	Marta Kostyuk	10	3
USA	Iva Jovic	11	4
SUI	Belinda Bencic	12	5
	Diana Shnaider	13	6
BEL	Elise Mertens	14	7
ROU	Sorana Cîrstea	16	8

- ^{1} Rankings are as of 12 October 2026

=== Other entrants ===
The following players received wildcards into the singles main draw:

- (Spain) Cristina Bucșa
- (China) Guo Hanyu
- (Australia) Daria Kasatkina
- ~~(China) Wang Xiyu~~

The following players received entry from the qualifying draw:

- (Poland) Katarzyna Kawa
- (Uzbekistan) Polina Kudermetova
- (Kazakhstan) Yulia Putintseva
- (Uzbekistan) Kamilla Rakhimova
- Aliaksandra Sasnovich
- (China) Shi Han

The following players received entry as lucky losers:

- (Ukraine) Anhelina Kalinina
- (United States) Alycia Parks
- (Ukraine) Daria Snigur
- Anastasia Zakharova

=== Withdrawals ===
- (Poland) Maja Chwalińska → replaced by (Ukraine) Daria Snigur
- Anna Kalinskaya → replaced by (France) Diane Parry
- (United States) Jessica Pegula → replaced by (Canada) Leylah Fernandez
- (Ukraine) Elina Svitolina → replaced by (Ukraine) Anhelina Kalinina
- (Poland) Iga Świątek → replaced by Anastasia Zakharova
- (China) Wang Xiyu → replaced by (United States) Alycia Parks

== Doubles main-draw entrants ==
=== Seeds ===
Country	Player	Country	Player	Rank^{1}	Seed
ESP	Cristina Bucșa	USA	Nicole Melichar-Martinez	22	1
~~TPE~~	~~Hsieh Su-wei~~	~~LAT~~	~~Jeļena Ostapenko~~	~~23~~	~~2~~
CHN	Guo Hanyu	FRA	Kristina Mladenovic	25	3
KAZ	Anna Danilina	CHN	Jiang Xinyu	32	4

- ^{1} Rankings are as of 12 October 2026

=== Other entrants ===
The following pair received entry as wildcards:

- (China) Qu Yihan / (China) Shao Yushan

The following pairs received entry as alternates:

- (Georgia (country)) Ekaterine Gorgodze / (Kazakhstan) Yulia Putintseva
- (China) Ye Qiuyu / (China) Zhang Ying

=== Withdrawals ===
- (Hungary) Anna Bondár / Alina Korneeva → replaced by (Georgia (country)) Ekaterine Gorgodze / (Kazakhstan) Yulia Putintseva
- (Chinese Taipei) Hsieh Su-wei / (Latvia) Jeļena Ostapenko → replaced by (China) Ye Qiuyu / (China) Zhang Ying
