= 2026 Toray Pan Pacific Open – Doubles =

Doubles
- 2026 Toray Pan Pacific Open

Final
- Champions: (Italy) Sara Errani (Italy) Jasmine Paolini
- Runners-up: (Canada) Gabriela Dabrowski (Brazil) Luisa Stefani
- Score: 6–2, 6–2
- Date: 1 November 2026

Details
- Draw: 32
- Seeds: 4

Events
Singles	Doubles
- Pan Pacific Open

Sara Errani and Jasmine Paolini defeated defending champion Luisa Stefani and her partner Gabriela Dabrowski in the final, 6–2, 6–2 to win the doubles tennis title at the 2026 Toray Pan Pacific Open.

Tímea Babos and Stefani were the reigning champions, but Babos took an extended break from tennis following the 2026 Australian Open.

== Seeds ==
1. (Canada) Gabriela Dabrowski / (Brazil) Luisa Stefani (final)
2. (Kazakhstan) Anna Danilina / (China) Jiang Xinyu (first round)
3. (New Zealand) Erin Routliffe / (Indonesia) Aldila Sutjiadi (first round)
4. (Australia) Ellen Perez / (Netherlands) Demi Schuurs (quarterfinals)

== Draw ==
Key

- Q = Qualifier
- WC = Wild card
- LL = Lucky loser
- Alt = Alternate
- ITF = ITF entry
- PR = Protected ranking
- SR = Special ranking
- SE = Special exempt
- JE = Junior exempt
- JR = Junior Accelerator Programme entrant
- CO = College Accelerator Programme entrant
- NG = Next Gen Accelerator Program entrant
- w/o = Walkover
- r = Retired
- d = Defaulted

First round
1	(Canada) G Dabrowski (Brazil) L Stefani	6	6
Alt	(Japan) M Ayukawa (United Kingdom) E Webley-Smith	1	4
Alt	(Kazakhstan) Y Putintseva; L Samsonova	3	1
(Chinese Taipei) H-c Chan (Japan) M Kato	6	6
4	(Australia) E Perez (Netherlands) D Schuurs	6	3	[11]
(China) Q Tang (China) Y Xu	4	6	[9]
(Australia) S Hunter (Australia) M Joint	6	6
WC	(Japan) M Kobori (Japan) A Shimizu	0	3
(Japan) S Aoyama (Chinese Taipei) E-s Liang	6	4	[8]
(Estonia) I Neel (Mexico) G Olmos	4	6	[10]
(Slovakia) T Mihalíková (United Kingdom) O Nicholls	6	6
3	(New Zealand) E Routliffe (Indonesia) A Sutjiadi	2	3
(Norway) U Eikeri (United States) Q Gleason	2	4
(United States) A Muhammad (China) S Zhang	6	6
(Italy) S Errani (Italy) J Paolini	7^{9}	6
2	(Kazakhstan) A Danilina (China) X Jiang	6^{7}	2

Quarterfinals
1	(Canada) G Dabrowski (Brazil) L Stefani	6	4	[10]
(Chinese Taipei) H-c Chan (Japan) M Kato	2	6	[7]
4	(Australia) E Perez (Netherlands) D Schuurs	1	6	[7]
(Australia) S Hunter (Australia) M Joint	6	3	[10]
(Estonia) I Neel (Mexico) G Olmos	2	4
(Slovakia) T Mihalíková (United Kingdom) O Nicholls	6	6
(United States) A Muhammad (China) S Zhang	3	4
(Italy) S Errani (Italy) J Paolini	6	6

Semifinals
1	(Canada) G Dabrowski (Brazil) L Stefani	5	6	[10]
(Australia) S Hunter (Australia) M Joint	7	4	[3]
(Slovakia) T Mihalíková (United Kingdom) O Nicholls	4	0
(Italy) S Errani (Italy) J Paolini	6	6

Final
1	(Canada) G Dabrowski (Brazil) L Stefani	2	2
(Italy) S Errani (Italy) J Paolini	6	6
