= 2026 Ningbo Open – Doubles =

Doubles
- 2026 Ningbo Open

Final
- Champions: (United States) Desirae Krawczyk (Hungary) Fanny Stollár
- Runners-up: (Spain) Cristina Bucșa (United States) Nicole Melichar-Martinez
- Score: 7–6^{(7–5)}, 5–7, [10–6]
- Date: 25 October 2026

Details
- Draw: 16
- Seeds: 4

Events
Singles	Doubles
- Ningbo Open

Desirae Krawczyk and Fanny Stollár defeated defending champion Nicole Melichar-Martinez and her partner Cristina Bucșa in the final, 7–6^{(7–5)}, 5–7, [10–6] to win the doubles tennis title at the 2026 Ningbo Open.

Melichar-Martinez and Liudmila Samsonova were the reigning champions, but Samsonova did not participate this year.

== Seeds ==
1. (Spain) Cristina Bucșa / (United States) Nicole Melichar-Martinez (final)
2. (Chinese Taipei) Hsieh Su-wei / (Latvia) Jeļena Ostapenko (withdrew)
3. (China) Guo Hanyu / (France) Kristina Mladenovic (semifinals, withdrew)
4. (Kazakhstan) Anna Danilina / (China) Jiang Xinyu (first round)

== Draw ==
Key

- Q = Qualifier
- WC = Wild card
- LL = Lucky loser
- Alt = Alternate
- ITF = ITF entry
- PR = Protected ranking
- SR = Special ranking
- SE = Special exempt
- JE = Junior exempt
- JR = Junior Accelerator Programme entrant
- CO = College Accelerator Programme entrant
- NG = Next Gen Accelerator Program entrant
- w/o = Walkover
- r = Retired
- d = Defaulted

=== Draw ===
First round
1	(Spain) C Bucșa (United States) N Melichar-Martinez	7	6
(Italy) S Errani (Italy) J Paolini	5	3
(Canada) L Fernandez (Ukraine) M Kostyuk	6	6
Alt	(Georgia (country)) E Gorgodze (Kazakhstan) Y Putintseva	1	2
3	(China) H Guo (France) K Mladenovic	6	6
(Japan) S Aoyama (Chinese Taipei) E-s Liang	1	1
WC	(China) Y Qu (China) Y Shao	1	1
(Australia) E Perez (Netherlands) D Schuurs	6	6
(Slovakia) T Mihalíková (United Kingdom) O Nicholls	4	5
M Kozyreva (United Kingdom) M Lumsden	6	7
(United States) D Krawczyk (Hungary) F Stollár	6	6
4	(Kazakhstan) A Danilina (China) X Jiang	3	4
(China) Q Tang (China) Y Xu	6^{5}	3
(New Zealand) E Routliffe (Indonesia) A Sutjiadi	7^{7}	6
(Norway) U Eikeri (United States) Q Gleason	6	6
Alt	(China) Q Ye (China) Y Zhang	1	1

Quarterfinals
1	(Spain) C Bucșa (United States) N Melichar-Martinez	w/o
(Canada) L Fernandez (Ukraine) M Kostyuk
3	(China) H Guo (France) K Mladenovic	2	7	[10]
(Australia) E Perez (Netherlands) D Schuurs	6	5	[4]
M Kozyreva (United Kingdom) M Lumsden	6	6^{5}	[4]
(United States) D Krawczyk (Hungary) F Stollár	3	7^{7}	[10]
(New Zealand) E Routliffe (Indonesia) A Sutjiadi	3	4
(Norway) U Eikeri (United States) Q Gleason	6	6

Semifinals
1	(Spain) C Bucșa (United States) N Melichar-Martinez	w/o
3	(China) H Guo (France) K Mladenovic
(United States) D Krawczyk (Hungary) F Stollár	7^{10}	7^{7}
(Norway) U Eikeri (United States) Q Gleason	6^{8}	6^{5}

Final
1	(Spain) C Bucșa (United States) N Melichar-Martinez	6^{5}	7	[6]
(United States) D Krawczyk (Hungary) F Stollár	7^{7}	5	[10]
