= 2026 Toray Pan Pacific Open – Singles =

Singles
- 2026 Toray Pan Pacific Open

Final
- Champion: Diana Shnaider
- Runner-up: (Canada) Leylah Fernandez
- Score: 6–4, 5–7, 6–2
- Date: 1 November 2026

Details
- Draw: 28 (6Q / 4WC)
- Seeds: 8

Events
Singles	Doubles
- Pan Pacific Open

At the 2026 Toray Pan Pacific Open, Diana Shnaider defeated Leylah Fernandez in the final, 6–4, 5–7, 6–2 to win the women's singles tennis title. The tournament took place on outdoor hard courts in Tokyo, Japan and was a WTA 500-level event.

Belinda Bencic was the reigning champion, but withdrew from the tournament due to a foot injury. Elena Rybakina secured the year end No. 1 ranking in singles for the first time in her career by reaching the quarterfinals, becoming the first woman representing an Asian country to achieve a year end No. 1 ranking, and the 17th player overall to do so.

== Seeds ==
The top four seeds received a bye into the second round.

1. (Kazakhstan) Elena Rybakina (quarterfinals, withdrew)
2. (Poland) Maja Chwalińska (withdrew)
3. Diana Shnaider (champion)
4. (Switzerland) Belinda Bencic (withdrew)
5. (Belgium) Elise Mertens (second round)
6. (Romania) Sorana Cîrstea (first round)
7. (Japan) Naomi Osaka (second round)
8. (Philippines) Alexandra Eala (quarterfinals)

== Draw ==
Key

- Q = Qualifier
- WC = Wild card
- LL = Lucky loser
- Alt = Alternate
- ITF = ITF entry
- PR = Protected ranking
- SR = Special ranking
- SE = Special exempt
- JE = Junior exempt
- JR = Junior Accelerator Programme entrant
- CO = College Accelerator Programme entrant
- NG = Next Gen Accelerator Program entrant
- w/o = Walkover
- r = Retired
- d = Defaulted

=== Finals ===
Semifinals
(Canada) Leylah Fernandez	7	6
LL	(Uzbekistan) Kamilla Rakhimova	5	3
3	Diana Shnaider	6	7^{9}
WC	(Slovakia) Mia Pohánková	4	6^{7}

Final
(Canada) Leylah Fernandez	4	7	2
3	Diana Shnaider	6	5	6

=== Top half ===
First round
Q	(Kazakhstan) Y Putintseva	6	3	6
(Greece) M Sakkari	4	6	1
(Canada) L Fernandez	6	6
WC	(Japan) H Sakatsume	2	4
WC	(Japan) M Uchijima	4	2
5	(Belgium) E Mertens	6	6
(United States) A Li	4	4
E Alexandrova	6	6
(France) D Parry	5	1
(Spain) C Bucșa	7	6
Q	(Australia) M Joint	6	7^{7}
6	(Romania) S Cîrstea	3	6^{4}

Second round
1	(Kazakhstan) E Rybakina	6	6
Q	(Kazakhstan) Y Putintseva	2	3
(Canada) L Fernandez	6	7^{10}
5	(Belgium) E Mertens	2	6^{8}
LL	(Uzbekistan) K Rakhimova	6	4	7^{7}
E Alexandrova	4	6	6^{5}
(Spain) C Bucșa	1	6	4
Q	(Australia) M Joint	6	2	6

Quarterfinals
1	(Kazakhstan) E Rybakina
(Canada) L Fernandez	w/o
LL	(Uzbekistan) K Rakhimova	7	5	6
Q	(Australia) M Joint	5	7	1

Semifinals
(Canada) L Fernandez	7	6
LL	(Uzbekistan) K Rakhimova	5	3

=== Bottom half ===
First round
8	(Philippines) A Eala	6	6
WC	(United Kingdom) M Stojsavljevic	1	2
Q	(Australia) D Kasatkina	0	5
(Australia) T Gibson	6	7
Q	A Sasnovich	6	6^{5}	6
(Czech Republic) N Bartůňková	4	7^{7}	3
7	(Japan) N Osaka	6	7^{7}
(Italy) J Paolini	3	6^{4}
Q	(Czech Republic) T Valentová	1	4
WC	(Slovakia) M Pohánková	6	6
(China) Xin Wang	1	6^{7}
Q	(United States) A Parks	6	7^{9}

Second round
8	(Philippines) A Eala	4	6	6
(Australia) T Gibson	6	2	0
Q	A Sasnovich	3	7	3
3	D Shnaider	6	5	6
7	(Japan) N Osaka	3	5
WC	(Slovakia) M Pohánková	6	7
Q	(United States) A Parks	6	6
LL	(Australia) K Birrell	3	1

Quarterfinals
8	(Philippines) A Eala	6	6^{5}	4
3	D Shnaider	2	7^{7}	6
WC	(Slovakia) M Pohánková	7^{7}	6
Q	(United States) A Parks	6^{3}	3

Semifinals
3	D Shnaider	6	7^{9}
WC	(Slovakia) M Pohánková	4	6^{7}

== Qualifying ==
=== Seeds ===
1. (China) Wang Xinyu (moved to main draw)
2. (Australia) Kimberly Birrell (qualifying competition, lucky loser)
3. Liudmila Samsonova (first round)
4. (Ukraine) Yuliia Starodubtseva (first round)
5. (United Kingdom) Katie Boulter (withdrew, still competing in Osaka)
6. (Ukraine) Oleksandra Oliynykova (first round)
7. (United States) Alycia Parks (qualified)
8. (Kazakhstan) Yulia Putintseva (qualified)
9. (Uzbekistan) Kamilla Rakhimova (qualifying competition, lucky loser)
10. (Australia) Daria Kasatkina (qualified)
11. (Switzerland) Viktorija Golubic (first round)
12. (China) Zhang Shuai (qualifying competition)

=== Qualifiers ===
1. (Czech Republic) Tereza Valentová
2. (Australia) Daria Kasatkina
3. (United States) Alycia Parks
4. Aliaksandra Sasnovich
5. (Kazakhstan) Yulia Putintseva
6. (Australia) Maya Joint

=== Lucky losers ===
1. (Australia) Kimberly Birrell
2. (Uzbekistan) Kamilla Rakhimova

=== Qualifying draw ===
==== First qualifier ====
First round
Alt	(Chinese Taipei) Liang En-shuo	2	6	2
(Czech Republic) Tereza Valentová	6	3	6
(United States) Kayla Day	3	6	5
12	(China) Zhang Shuai	6	3	7

Qualifying competition
(Czech Republic) Tereza Valentová	7	6
12	(China) Zhang Shuai	5	2

==== Second qualifier ====
First round
2	(Australia) Kimberly Birrell	6	6
WC	(Japan) Aoi Ito	4	2
(China) Ma Yexin	2	2
10	(Australia) Daria Kasatkina	6	6

Qualifying competition
2	(Australia) Kimberly Birrell	3	4
10	(Australia) Daria Kasatkina	6	6

==== Third qualifier ====
First round
3	Liudmila Samsonova	6	5	6^{3}
PR	(United Kingdom) Heather Watson	2	7	7^{7}
WC	(Japan) Ena Shibahara	6	6^{7}	6^{5}
7	(United States) Alycia Parks	2	7^{9}	7^{7}

Qualifying competition
PR	(United Kingdom) Heather Watson	1	2
7	(United States) Alycia Parks	6	6

==== Fourth qualifier ====
First round
4	(Ukraine) Yuliia Starodubtseva	4	5
Aliaksandra Sasnovich	6	7
WC	(Japan) Shiho Tsujioka	5	1
9	(Uzbekistan) Kamilla Rakhimova	7	6

Qualifying competition
Aliaksandra Sasnovich	6	6
9	(Uzbekistan) Kamilla Rakhimova	4	4

==== Fifth qualifier ====
First round
Alt	(Japan) Kyōka Okamura	4	3
WC	(Japan) Sayaka Ishii	6	6
Alt	(Japan) Hayu Kinoshita	5	2
8	(Kazakhstan) Yulia Putintseva	7	6

Qualifying competition
WC	(Japan) Sayaka Ishii	6	2	3
8	(Kazakhstan) Yulia Putintseva	4	6	6

==== Sixth qualifier ====
First round
6	(Ukraine) Oleksandra Oliynykova	3	1
(Japan) Mai Hontama	6	6
(Australia) Maya Joint	6^{4}	6	7
11	(Switzerland) Viktorija Golubic	7^{7}	4	5

Qualifying competition
(Japan) Mai Hontama	5	3
(Australia) Maya Joint	7	6
