= 2026 Ningbo Open – Singles =

Singles
- 2026 Ningbo Open

Final
- Champion: (Kazakhstan) Elena Rybakina
- Runner-up: (Canada) Leylah Fernandez
- Score: 6–2, 6–2
- Date: 25 October 2026

Details
- Draw: 28 (6Q / 4WC)
- Seeds: 8

Events
Singles	Doubles
- Ningbo Open

At the 2026 Ningbo Open, defending champion Elena Rybakina defeated Leylah Fernandez in the final, 6–2, 6–2 to win the women's singles tennis title. The event took place on outdoor hard courts in Ningbo, China, and was a WTA 500-level tournament. Rybakina became the first player to successfully defend the Ningbo Open title since the tournament began in 2010.

== Seeds ==
The top four seeds received a bye into the second round.

1. (Kazakhstan) Elena Rybakina (champion)
2. (Poland) Iga Świątek (withdrew)
3. (Ukraine) Marta Kostyuk (second round, retired)
4. (United States) Iva Jovic (quarterfinals)
5. (Switzerland) Belinda Bencic (second round)
6. Diana Shnaider (semifinals)
7. (Belgium) Elise Mertens (first round)
8. (Romania) Sorana Cîrstea (second round)

== Draw ==
Key

- Q = Qualifier
- WC = Wild card
- LL = Lucky loser
- Alt = Alternate
- ITF = ITF entry
- PR = Protected ranking
- SR = Special ranking
- SE = Special exempt
- JE = Junior exempt
- JR = Junior Accelerator Programme entrant
- CO = College Accelerator Programme entrant
- NG = Next Gen Accelerator Program entrant
- w/o = Walkover
- r = Retired
- d = Defaulted

=== Finals ===
Semifinals
1	(Kazakhstan) Elena Rybakina	6	7
6	Diana Shnaider	3	5
(Canada) Leylah Fernandez	6	7
(Czech Republic) Marie Bouzková	3	5

Final
1	(Kazakhstan) Elena Rybakina	6	6
(Canada) Leylah Fernandez	2	2

=== Top half ===
First round
WC	(Spain) C Bucșa	6^{5}	2
Q	(Uzbekistan) P Kudermetova	7^{7}	6
Q	(Poland) K Kawa	1	6	6
LL	(Ukraine) D Snigur	6	2	4
(Latvia) J Ostapenko	3	1^{r}
5	(Switzerland) B Bencic	6	1
(Italy) J Paolini	6	7
LL	(Ukraine) A Kalinina	2	5
(Philippines) A Eala	6	6
(France) D Parry	3	1
Q	(Kazakhstan) Y Putintseva	5	6^{4}
6	D Shnaider	7	7^{7}

Second round
1	(Kazakhstan) E Rybakina	5
Q	(Uzbekistan) P Kudermetova	0^{r}
Q	(Poland) K Kawa	7	6
5	(Switzerland) B Bencic	5	2
4	(United States) I Jovic	6	6
(Italy) J Paolini	4	3
(Philippines) A Eala	5	4
6	D Shnaider	7	6

Quarterfinals
1	(Kazakhstan) E Rybakina	6	3	6
Q	(Poland) K Kawa	1	6	1
4	(United States) I Jovic	3	6	1
6	D Shnaider	6	4	6

Semifinals
1	(Kazakhstan) E Rybakina	6	7
6	D Shnaider	3	5

=== Bottom half ===
First round
7	(Belgium) E Mertens	6	3	5
(Canada) L Fernandez	2	6	7
WC	(Australia) D Kasatkina	4	2
Q	A Sasnovich	6	6
WC	(China) H Guo	2	3
E Alexandrova	6	6
8	(Romania) S Cîrstea	6	6
Q	(China) H Shi	3	2
(Czech Republic) S Bejlek	4	6	6
LL	(United States) A Parks	6	3	3
Q	(Uzbekistan) K Rakhimova	4	4
(Czech Republic) M Bouzková	6	6

Second round
(Canada) L Fernandez	7	6^{3}	6
Q	A Sasnovich	5	7^{7}	3
E Alexandrova	6	0
3	(Ukraine) M Kostyuk	4	0^{r}
8	(Romania) S Cîrstea	6^{3}	4
(Czech Republic) S Bejlek	7^{7}	6
(Czech Republic) M Bouzková	7	6
LL	A Zakharova	5	2

Quarterfinals
(Canada) L Fernandez	4	6	6
E Alexandrova	6	2	1
(Czech Republic) S Bejlek	3	4
(Czech Republic) M Bouzková	6	6

Semifinals
(Canada) L Fernandez	6	7
(Czech Republic) M Bouzková	3	5

== Qualifying ==
=== Seeds ===
1. (Ukraine) Daria Snigur (qualifying competition, retired, lucky loser)
2. (Ukraine) Yuliia Starodubtseva (first round)
3. (Ukraine) Anhelina Kalinina (qualifying competition, retired, lucky loser)
4. (Egypt) Mayar Sherif (first round)
5. (Poland) Magdalena Fręch (first round, retired)
6. (United States) Alycia Parks (qualifying competition, lucky loser)
7. (Hungary) Anna Bondár (first round)
8. (Uzbekistan) Kamilla Rakhimova (qualified)
9. Alina Korneeva (qualifying competition)
10. (Kazakhstan) Yulia Putintseva (qualified)
11. (Thailand) Mananchaya Sawangkaew (first round)
12. (United States) Katie Volynets (first round, retired)

=== Qualifiers ===
1. (Poland) Katarzyna Kawa
2. (Uzbekistan) Polina Kudermetova
3. Aliaksandra Sasnovich
4. (Uzbekistan) Kamilla Rakhimova
5. (China) Shi Han
6. (Kazakhstan) Yulia Putintseva

=== Lucky losers ===
1. (Ukraine) Anhelina Kalinina
2. (Ukraine) Daria Snigur
3. (United States) Alycia Parks
4. Anastasia Zakharova

=== Qualifying draw ===
==== First qualifier ====
First round
1	(Ukraine) Daria Snigur	6	2	6
WC	(China) Lin Yujun	4	6	1
(Poland) Katarzyna Kawa	6	3
12	(United States) Katie Volynets	1	4^{r}

Qualifying competition
1	(Ukraine) Daria Snigur	1	0^{r}
(Poland) Katarzyna Kawa	6	2

==== Second qualifier ====
First round
2	(Ukraine) Yuliia Starodubtseva	1	5
Anastasia Zakharova	6	7
(Uzbekistan) Polina Kudermetova	6	6
11	(Thailand) Mananchaya Sawangkaew	3	4

Qualifying competition
Anastasia Zakharova	3	3
(Uzbekistan) Polina Kudermetova	6	6

==== Third qualifier ====
First round
3	(Ukraine) Anhelina Kalinina	6	3	6
(Switzerland) Simona Waltert	4	6	3
Aliaksandra Sasnovich	7	6
7	(Hungary) Anna Bondár	5	1

Qualifying competition
3	(Ukraine) Anhelina Kalinina	3^{r}
Aliaksandra Sasnovich	5

==== Fourth qualifier ====
First round
4	(Egypt) Mayar Sherif	6	1	1
Tatiana Prozorova	4	6	6
(Ukraine) Dayana Yastremska	2	4
8	(Uzbekistan) Kamilla Rakhimova	6	6

Qualifying competition
Tatiana Prozorova	6^{4}	6	4
8	(Uzbekistan) Kamilla Rakhimova	7^{7}	4	6

==== Fifth qualifier ====
First round
5	(Poland) Magdalena Fręch	4	1^{r}
WC	(China) Shi Han	6	0
WC	(China) Dong Jiali	0	2
9	Alina Korneeva	6	6

Qualifying competition
WC	(China) Shi Han	7^{7}	6
9	Alina Korneeva	6^{4}	0

==== Sixth qualifier ====
First round
6	(United States) Alycia Parks	4	4
(Belgium) Jeline Vandromme	6	4^{r}
WC	(China) Qu Yihan	1	6^{0}
10	(Kazakhstan) Yulia Putintseva	6	7^{7}

Qualifying competition
6	(United States) Alycia Parks	2	2
10	(Kazakhstan) Yulia Putintseva	6	6
