= 2026 BNP Paribas Open – Women's doubles =

Women's doubles
- 2026 BNP Paribas Open

Final
- Champions: (Czech Republic) Kateřina Siniaková (United States) Taylor Townsend
- Runners-up: (Kazakhstan) Anna Danilina (Serbia) Aleksandra Krunić
- Score: 7–6^{(7–4)}, 6–4

Details
- Draw: 32 (3 WC)
- Seeds: 8

Events
Singles	men	women
Doubles	men	women	mixed
- BNP Paribas Open

Kateřina Siniaková and Taylor Townsend defeated Anna Danilina and Aleksandra Krunić in the final, 7–6^{(7–4)}, 6–4 to win the women's doubles tennis title at the 2026 Indian Wells Open. It was the seventh WTA 1000 title for Siniaková and third for Townsend.

Asia Muhammad and Demi Schuurs were the defending champions, but chose to compete with different partners this year. Muhammad partnered Erin Routliffe, but lost in the first round to Alexandra Panova and Laura Siegemund. Schuurs partnered Ellen Perez, but lost in the quarterfinals to Siniaková and Townsend.

== Seeds ==
1. (Italy) Sara Errani / (Italy) Jasmine Paolini (semifinals)
2. (Canada) Gabriela Dabrowski / (Brazil) Luisa Stefani (quarterfinals)
3. (Czech Republic) Kateřina Siniaková / (United States) Taylor Townsend (champions)
4. (Belgium) Elise Mertens / (China) Zhang Shuai (first round)
5. (Kazakhstan) Anna Danilina / (Serbia) Aleksandra Krunić (final)
6. (United States) Asia Muhammad / (New Zealand) Erin Routliffe (first round)
7. (Spain) Cristina Bucșa / (United States) Nicole Melichar-Martinez (semifinals)
8. (Australia) Ellen Perez / (Netherlands) Demi Schuurs (quarterfinals)

== Draw ==
Key

- Q = Qualifier
- WC = Wild card
- LL = Lucky loser
- Alt = Alternate
- ITF = ITF entry
- PR = Protected ranking
- SR = Special ranking
- SE = Special exempt
- JE = Junior exempt
- JR = Junior Accelerator Programme entrant
- CO = College Accelerator Programme entrant
- NG = Next Gen Accelerator Program entrant
- w/o = Walkover
- r = Retired
- d = Defaulted

=== Finals ===
Semifinals
1	(Italy) Sara Errani (Italy) Jasmine Paolini	2	2
3	(Czech Republic) Kateřina Siniaková (United States) Taylor Townsend	6	6
5	(Kazakhstan) Anna Danilina (Serbia) Aleksandra Krunić	6	6
7	(Spain) Cristina Bucșa (United States) Nicole Melichar-Martinez	3	4

Final
3	(Czech Republic) Kateřina Siniaková (United States) Taylor Townsend	7^{7}	6
5	(Kazakhstan) Anna Danilina (Serbia) Aleksandra Krunić	6^{4}	4

=== Top half ===
First round
1	(Italy) S Errani (Italy) J Paolini	6	7^{8}
(Romania) J Cristian (Denmark) C Tauson	2	6^{6}
(Switzerland) B Bencic (Romania) S Cîrstea	3	0
(China) Y Xu (China) Z Yang	6	6
(China) H Guo (France) K Mladenovic	6	4	[10]
(Czech Republic) L Nosková; D Shnaider	4	6	[2]
A Panova (Germany) L Siegemund	6	6
6	(United States) A Muhammad (New Zealand) E Routliffe	2	3
3	(Czech Republic) K Siniaková (United States) T Townsend	6	7
WC	(United Kingdom) E Raducanu (Romania) E-G Ruse	2	5
(United States) C McNally; L Samsonova	3	2
E Alexandrova (United States) S Kenin	6	6
(United States) M Kessler (United States) J Pegula	5	6	[7]
(Japan) E Hozumi (Chinese Taipei) F-h Wu	7	1	[10]
Alt	(France) V Gracheva (Poland) M Linette	4	5
8	(Australia) E Perez (Netherlands) D Schuurs	6	7

Second round
1	(Italy) S Errani (Italy) J Paolini	6	7
(China) Y Xu (China) Z Yang	2	5
(China) H Guo (France) K Mladenovic	6	6
A Panova (Germany) L Siegemund	4	3
3	(Czech Republic) K Siniaková (United States) T Townsend	6	6
E Alexandrova (United States) S Kenin	1	2
(Japan) E Hozumi (Chinese Taipei) F-h Wu	1	2
8	(Australia) E Perez (Netherlands) D Schuurs	6	6

Quarterfinals
1	(Italy) S Errani (Italy) J Paolini	4	7	[10]
(China) H Guo (France) K Mladenovic	6	5	[6]
3	(Czech Republic) K Siniaková (United States) T Townsend	6	6
8	(Australia) E Perez (Netherlands) D Schuurs	4	4

Semifinals
1	(Italy) S Errani (Italy) J Paolini	2	2
3	(Czech Republic) K Siniaková (United States) T Townsend	6	6

=== Bottom half ===
First round
5	(Kazakhstan) A Danilina (Serbia) A Krunić	6	6
WC	(United States) S Stephens (Croatia) D Vekić	3	3
(Ukraine) L Kichenok (United States) D Krawczyk	7	6^{5}	[12]
(Slovakia) T Mihalíková (United Kingdom) O Nicholls	5	7^{7}	[10]
(Philippines) A Eala (United States) I Jovic	2	2
WC	(United States) H Baptiste (Latvia) J Ostapenko	6	6
M Andreeva (Canada) V Mboko	6	4	[10]
4	(Belgium) E Mertens (China) S Zhang	4	6	[8]
7	(Spain) C Bucșa (United States) N Melichar-Martinez	6	6
PR	(Croatia) D Jurak Schreiber (Mexico) G Olmos	2	3
(Chinese Taipei) H-c Chan (Indonesia) J Tjen	6	6
PR	(Slovenia) A Klepač (Poland) K Piter	4	2
PR	(Estonia) I Neel (United States) P Stearns	6	3
(Japan) M Kato (Hungary) F Stollár	1	0^{r}
(Norway) U Eikeri (China) X Jiang	7	3	[5]
2	(Canada) G Dabrowski (Brazil) L Stefani	5	6	[10]

Second round
5	(Kazakhstan) A Danilina (Serbia) A Krunić	6	6
(Ukraine) L Kichenok (United States) D Krawczyk	4	1
WC	(United States) H Baptiste (Latvia) J Ostapenko	6^{7}	6	[9]
M Andreeva (Canada) V Mboko	7^{9}	3	[11]
7	(Spain) C Bucșa (United States) N Melichar-Martinez	6^{10}	6	[10]
(Chinese Taipei) H-c Chan (Indonesia) J Tjen	7^{12}	4	[5]
PR	(Estonia) I Neel (United States) P Stearns	4	2
2	(Canada) G Dabrowski (Brazil) L Stefani	6	6

Quarterfinals
5	(Kazakhstan) A Danilina (Serbia) A Krunić	7^{7}	6
M Andreeva (Canada) V Mboko	6^{5}	2
7	(Spain) C Bucșa (United States) N Melichar-Martinez	7^{7}	3	[10]
2	(Canada) G Dabrowski (Brazil) L Stefani	6^{3}	6	[8]

Semifinals
5	(Kazakhstan) A Danilina (Serbia) A Krunić	6	6
7	(Spain) C Bucșa (United States) N Melichar-Martinez	3	4

== Seeded teams ==
The following are the seeded teams. Seedings are based on WTA rankings as of February 23, 2026.

^{‡}	Champion
^{†}	Runner-up

Country	Player	Country	Player	Rank	Seed
ITA	Sara Errani	ITA	Jasmine Paolini	8	1
CAN	Gabriela Dabrowski	BRA	Luisa Stefani	12	2
CZE	Kateřina Siniaková ^{‡}	USA	Taylor Townsend ^{‡}	12	3
BEL	Elise Mertens	CHN	Zhang Shuai	13	4
KAZ	Anna Danilina ^{†}	SRB	Aleksandra Krunić ^{†}	14	5
USA	Asia Muhammad	NZL	Erin Routliffe	30	6
ESP	Cristina Bucșa	USA	Nicole Melichar-Martinez	37	7
AUS	Ellen Perez	NED	Demi Schuurs	42	8

== Other entry information ==
=== Wildcards ===
- (United States) Hailey Baptiste / (Latvia) Jeļena Ostapenko
- (United Kingdom) Emma Raducanu / (Romania) Elena-Gabriela Ruse
- (United States) Sloane Stephens / (Croatia) Donna Vekić

=== Protected ranking ===
- (Croatia) Darija Jurak Schreiber / (Mexico) Giuliana Olmos
- (Slovenia) Andreja Klepač / (Poland) Katarzyna Piter
- (Estonia) Ingrid Neel / (United States) Peyton Stearns

=== Alternates ===
- (France) Varvara Gracheva / (Poland) Magda Linette

=== Withdrawals ===
- (Australia) Storm Hunter / (Australia) Maya Joint → replaced by (France) Varvara Gracheva / (Poland) Magda Linette
- (Czech Republic) Barbora Krejčíková / (United States) Caty McNally → replaced by (United States) Caty McNally / Liudmila Samsonova
