= WTA rankings =

Women's Tennis Association rankings of players

The WTA rankings (known as the PIF WTA Rankings for sponsorship reasons) are the ratings defined by the Women's Tennis Association (WTA), introduced in November 1975. The computer that calculates the ranking is nicknamed "Medusa".

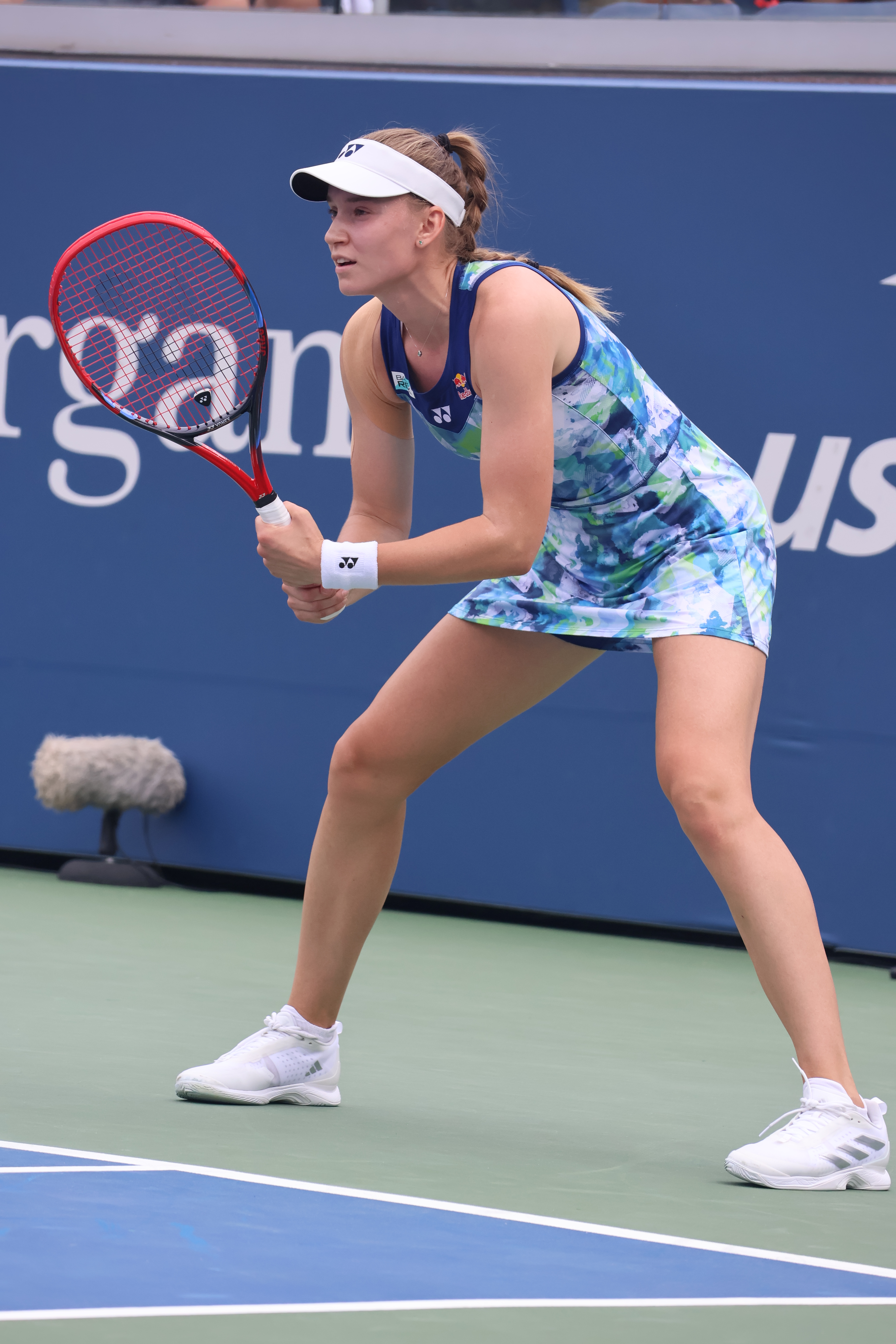
Elena Rybakina, women's singles No. 1

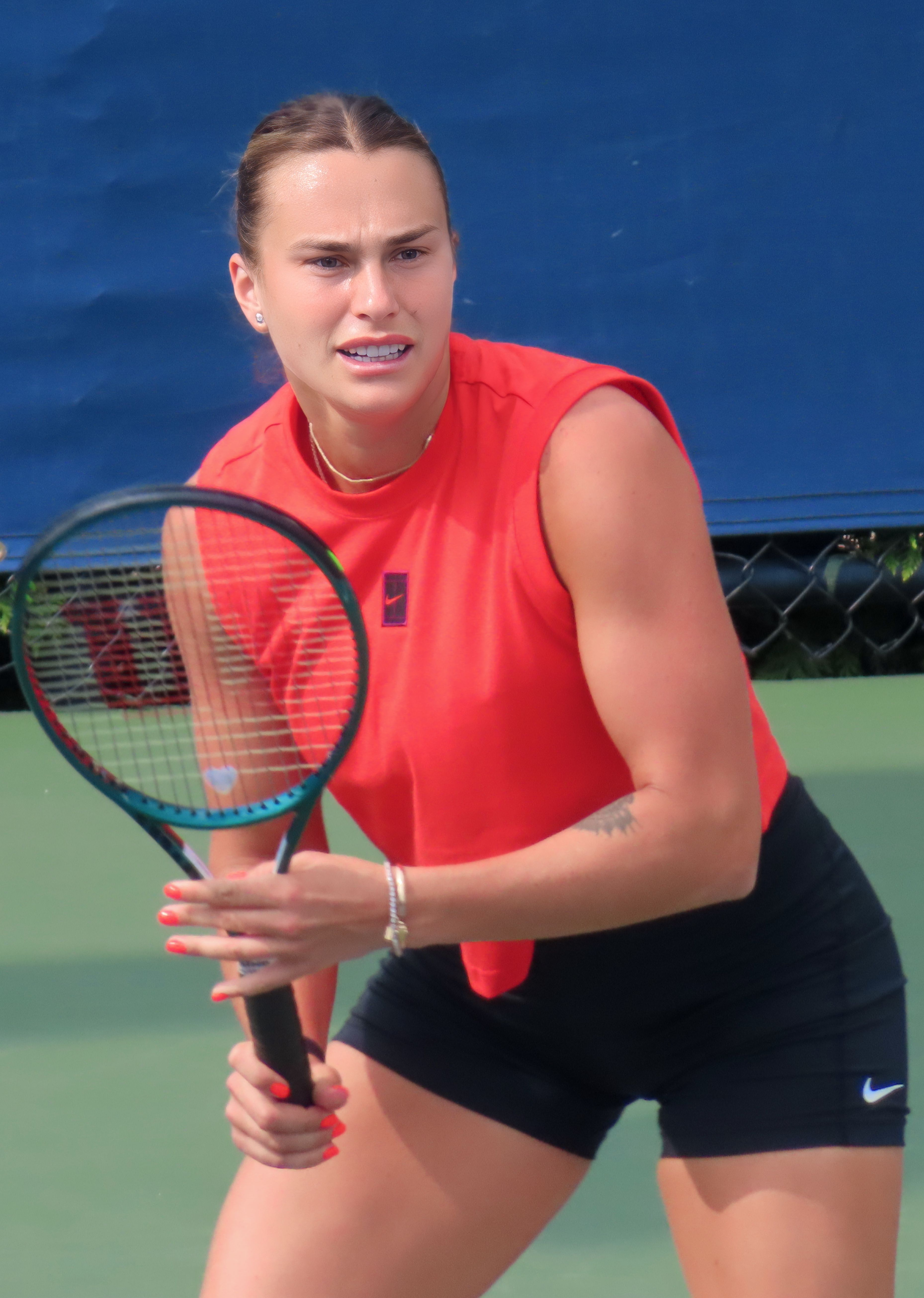
Aryna Sabalenka, women's singles No. 2

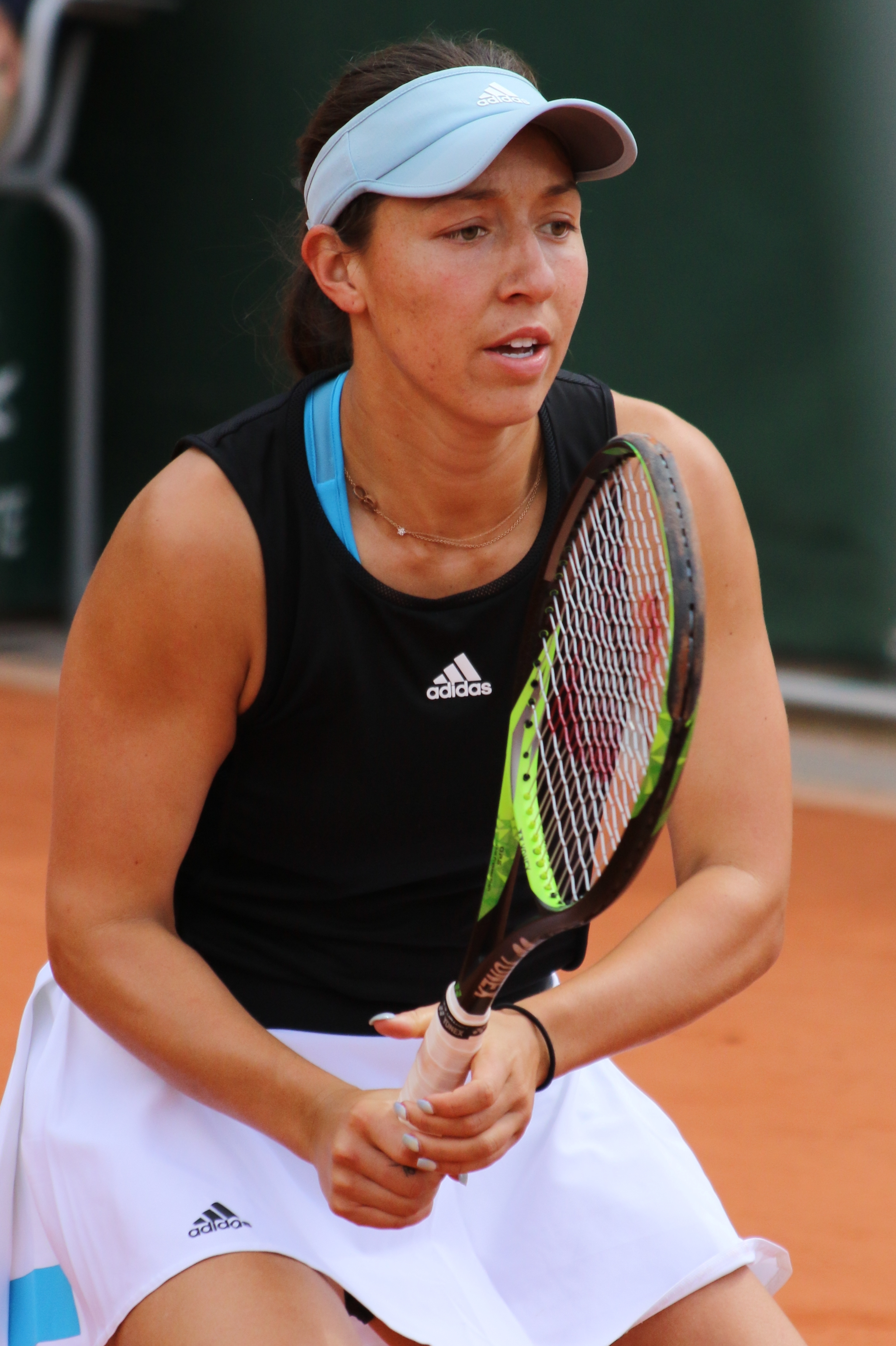
Jessica Pegula, women's singles No. 4

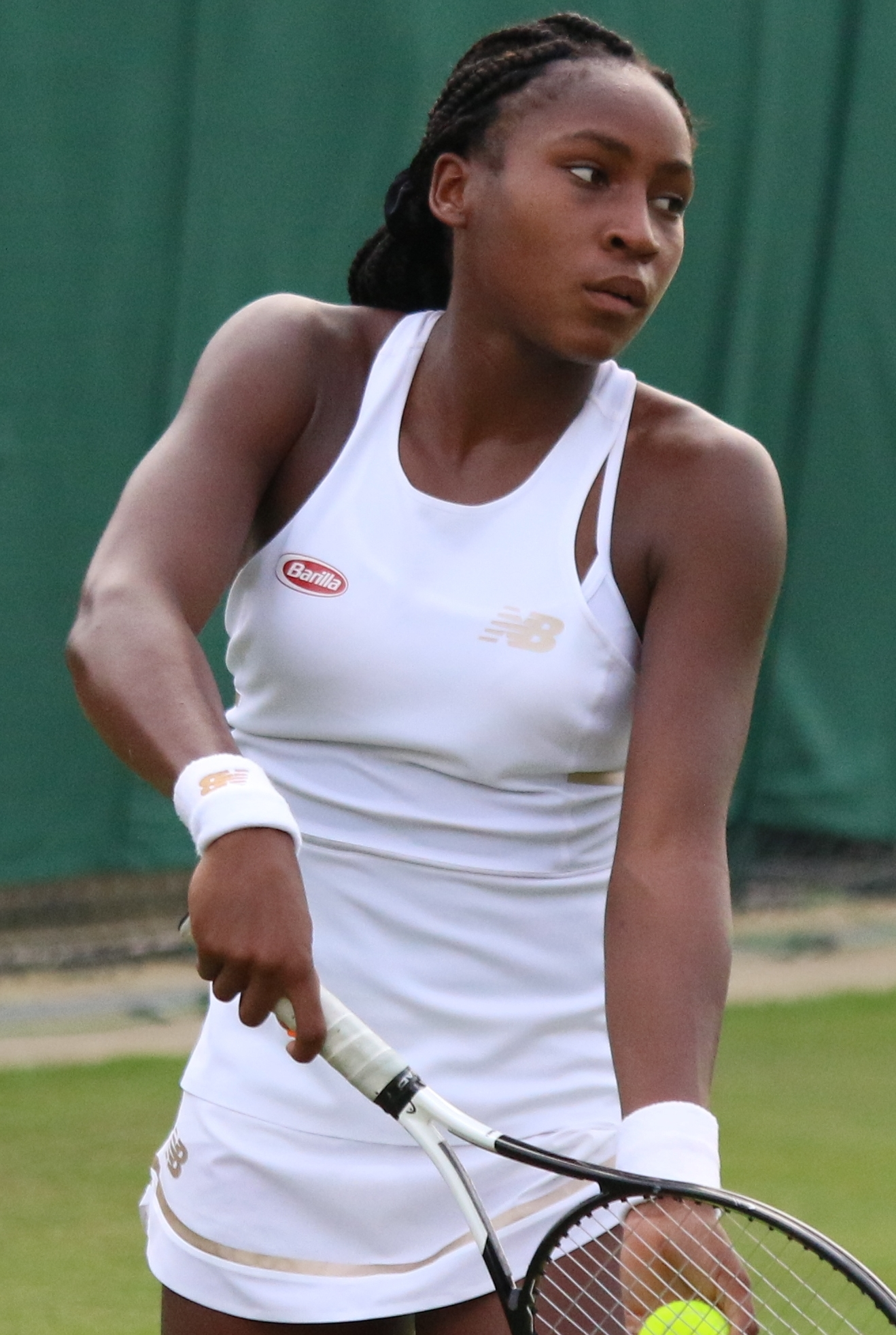
Coco Gauff, women's singles No. 5

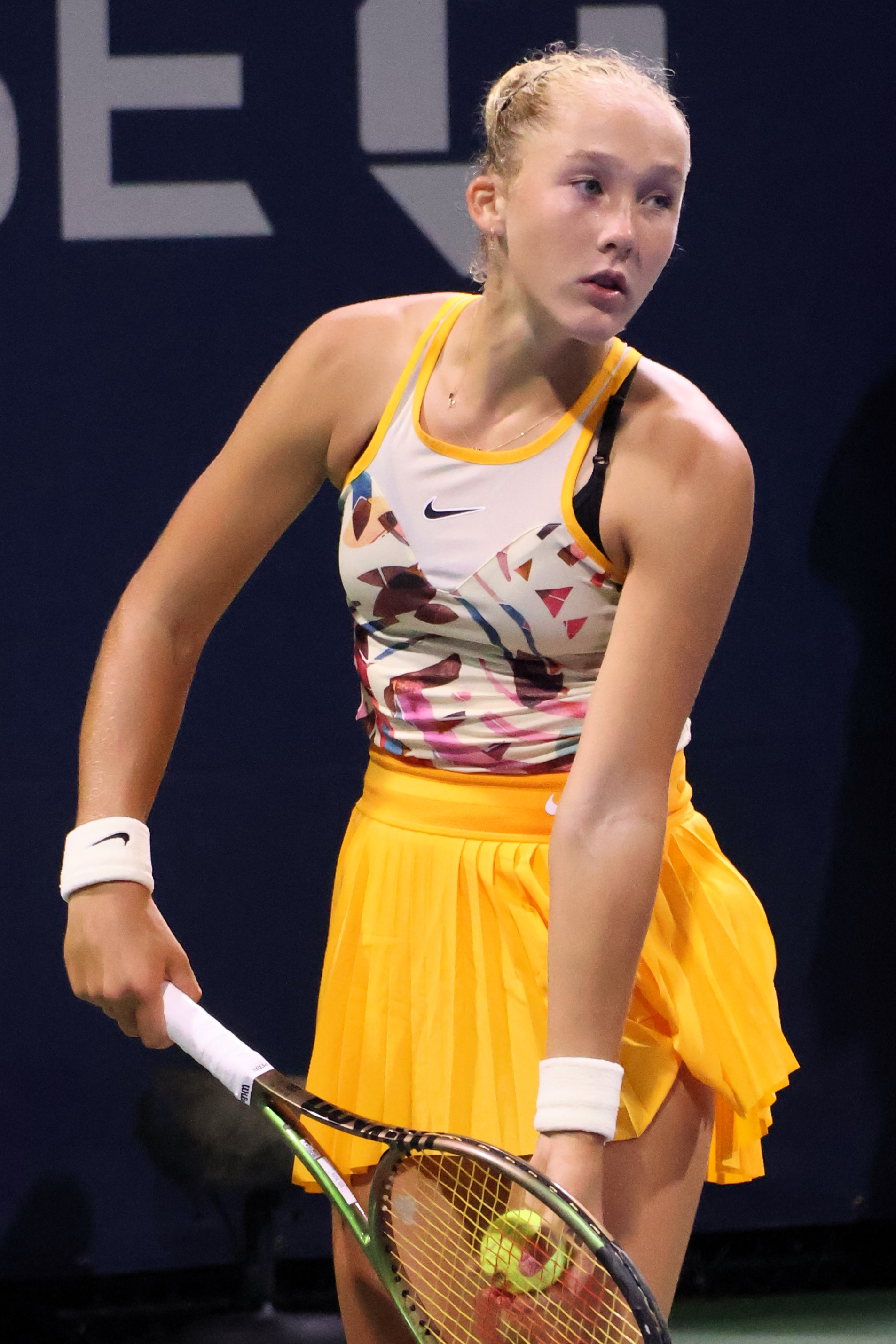
Mirra Andreeva, women's singles No. 3

== Ranking method ==
Points are awarded based on how far a player advances in a tournament. There are two ranking lists that are calculated based on the points: the WTA rankings, and the Race to the Finals, which determines qualification for the WTA Finals. The WTA rankings are a rolling 52-week ranking, in which points earned at a tournament count for 52 weeks before dropping off. The Race to the Finals accumulates points earned within the Race Year, which the WTA rulebook defines as "tournaments beginning the week before the previous year's WTA Finals through and including tournaments beginning two weeks before the current year's WTA Finals, but excluding results from the WTA Finals".

=== Singles Rankings ===
The rankings are based on a rolling 52-week system. A player’s ranking is based on her best results at up to 18 tournaments (19 if she played the WTA Finals), which must include:

- the four Grand Slams
- six WTA 1000 Mandatory combined/virtually combined tournaments
- one WTA 1000 Mandatory tournament (WTA only)
- the best seven results from all WTA 1000 Mandatory, WTA 500, WTA 250, and WTA 125 tournaments and ITF W15+ events
- the WTA Finals as a bonus tournament if the player attended

If a player lacks the required number of Grand Slam or WTA 1000 Mandatory results, additional results from other tournaments will be counted.

If a player has more results in a category than required, only her best ones count. For example, in the 2026 WTA Tour, there are seven WTA 1000 Mandatory combined/virtually combined tournaments. If the player participated in all of them, only the best six results count. Furthermore, there are three WTA 1000 Mandatory (WTA only) tournaments, but only the best result counts if a player participated in all three.

Players accepted directly into a WTA 1000 Mandatory tournament must play it. Players ranked in the top 50 at a tournament’s entry deadline who are directly accepted into WTA 500 tournaments must play them. If they are accepted into more than six, they are only required to play six. A player not participating in a required event will be given a zero ranking point result. A zero ranking point result counts towards the "best" results, even if it displaces a better one.

=== Race Singles ===
The points for this ranking are calculated by accumulating the ranking points earned within the Race Year. The results must include:

- the four Grand Slam tournaments
- six WTA 1000 Mandatory combined/virtually combined tournaments
- one WTA 1000 Mandatory (WTA only) tournament
- the best seven results from all WTA 1000 Mandatory, WTA 500, and WTA 250 tournaments.

The top seven players qualify, followed by the highest-ranked current-year Grand Slam winner ranked 8–20 who has not already qualified. If there is none, the next-highest-ranked player qualifies.

Like the singles rankings, only the best results in each category count, and absence from a required tournament is recorded as a zero-point result.

=== Doubles Rankings ===
For doubles, the best twelve tournament results across all tournament levels during the rolling 52-week period are used.

=== Race Doubles ===
Ranking for doubles in the Race to the Finals is based on a team's best 12 ranking point results from Grand Slams, WTA 1000 Mandatory, WTA 500, or WTA 250 tournaments from the current Race Year.

Up until 2016, the WTA also distributed ranking points, for singles players only, who competed at the Summer Olympics. However, this has since been discontinued.

In order to appear on the WTA rankings, players must earn ranking points in at least three tournaments, or a minimum of 10 singles ranking points or 10 doubles ranking points in one or more tournaments.

The points distribution for tournaments in 2024 is shown below. Points earned in 2023 and before were different and retained their values until they expired after 52 weeks except for 2013 points.

=== Points table ===
Category	W	F	SF	QF	R16	R32	R64	R128	Q	Q3	Q2	Q1
Grand Slam (128S, 128Q)	2000	1300	780	430	240	130	70	10	40	30	20	2
Grand Slam (64D)	2000	1300	780	430	240	130	10		40			
WTA Finals (S)	1500*	1000*	600*	(+200 per round robin win)								
WTA Finals (D)	1500*	1000*	600*	(+200 per round robin win)								
WTA 1000 (96S, 48Q)	1000	650	390	215	120	65	35	10	30		20	2
WTA 1000 (56S, 32Q)	1000	650	390	215	120	65	10		30		20	2
WTA 1000 (32/28D)	1000	650	390	215	120	10						
WTA 500 (48S, 24Q)	500	325	195	108	60	32	1		25		13	1
WTA 500 (30/28S, 24/16Q)	500	325	195	108	60	1			25	18	13	1
WTA 500 (24D)	500	325	195	108	60	1						
WTA 500 (16D)	500	325	195	108	1							
WTA 250 (32S, 24/16Q)	250	163	98	54	30	1			18		12	1
WTA 250 (16D)	250	163	98	54	1							
WTA 125 (32S, 16Q)	125	81	49	27	15	1			6		4	1
WTA 125 (32S, 8Q)	125	81	49	27	15	1			6			1
WTA 125 (16D)	125	81	49	27	1							
WTA 125 (8D)	125	81	49	1								
W100 (48S, 32/24Q)	100	65	39	21	12	7	1		5		3	
W100 (32S, 32Q)	100	65	39	21	12	1			5		3	
W100 (16D)	100	65	39	21	1							
W75 (48S, 32/24Q)	75	49	29	16	9	5	1		3		2	
W75 (32S, 32Q)	75	49	29	16	9	1			3		2	
W75 (16D)	75	49	29	16	1							
W50 (48S, 32/24Q)	50	33	20	11	6	3	1		2		1	
W50 (32S, 32Q)	50	33	20	11	6	1			2		1	
W50 (16D)	50	33	20	11	1							
W35 (48S, 32/24Q)	35	23	14	8	4	2	1		1			
W35 (32S, 64/48/32/24Q)	35	23	14	8	4	1			1			
W35 (16D)	35	23	14	8	1							
W15 (32S, 64/48/32/24Q)	15	10	6	3	1							
W15 (16D)	15	10	6	3								

S = singles players, D = doubles teams, Q = qualification players.
* Assumes undefeated round robin match record.

Note that if a player or team receives one or more byes and then loses their first match of the tournament, they will only receive points for the first round of that tournament. For example, if a player receives a bye in R64 and then loses her match in R32, she will only receive points for R64 despite having advanced (via bye) to R32. Similarly, if a player or team withdraws from their first match after receiving a bye, they will not be awarded any points for that tournament.

In ITF tournaments, the main draw is normally 32 for singles and 16 for doubles. Losers in the first round of doubles will receive points equal to that shown in the R32 column above. For subsequent rounds (quarter-finals onwards) the points are the same as for singles.

== Current rankings ==
=== Singles ===
Singles race rankings as of 16 November 2026
No.	Player	Points	Tourn
1	Elena Rybakina (KAZ) No	8,099	20
2	Aryna Sabalenka ✓	6,485	20
3	Mirra Andreeva ✓	6,306	20
4	Coco Gauff (USA) ✓	5,763	20
5	Jessica Pegula (USA) ✓	5,760	20
6	Elina Svitolina (UKR) ✓	5,121	20
7	Karolína Muchová (CZE) ✓	4,665	20
8	Linda Nosková (CZE) ✓	4,343	20
9	Iga Świątek (POL)	4,188	19
10	Marta Kostyuk (UKR) ✓	3,910	20
11	Diana Shnaider ✓	3,238	23
12	Iva Jovic (USA)	2,941	22
13	Maja Chwalińska (POL)	2,755	13
14	Elise Mertens (BEL)	2,540	23
15	Sorana Cîrstea (ROU)	2,386	22
16	Naomi Osaka (JPN)	2,315	20
17	Alexandra Eala (PHL)	2,204	26
18	Leylah Fernandez (CAN)	2,201	27
19	Belinda Bencic (SUI)	2,168	18
20	Victoria Mboko (CAN)	2,143	14

✓ Qualified for the 2026 WTA Finals.
No Qualifiers who withdrew indicated in italics.

[ · ]

WTA rankings (singles) as of 16 November 2026
No.	Player	Points	Move
1	Elena Rybakina (KAZ)	8,099	Steady
2	Mirra Andreeva	7,806	▲1
3	Aryna Sabalenka	6,685	▼1
4	Coco Gauff (USA)	6,163	Steady
5	Jessica Pegula (USA)	6,160	Steady
6	Elina Svitolina (UKR)	5,921	Steady
7	Linda Nosková (CZE)	4,743	▲1
8	Karolína Muchová (CZE)	4,665	▼1
9	Iga Świątek (POL)	4,188	Steady
10	Marta Kostyuk (UKR)	3,910	Steady
11	Diana Shnaider	3,238	Steady
12	Maja Chwalińska (POL)	3,016	Steady
13	Iva Jovic (USA)	2,941	Steady
14	Elise Mertens (BEL)	2,540	Steady
15	Alexandra Eala (PHL)	2,392	Steady
16	Sorana Cîrstea (ROU)	2,386	Steady
17	Naomi Osaka (JPN)	2,315	Steady
18	Leylah Fernandez (CAN)	2,201	Steady
19	Madison Keys (USA)	2,175	Steady
20	Belinda Bencic (SUI)	2,168	Steady

=== Doubles ===
Doubles race rankings as of 16 November 2026
No.	Player	Points	Tourn
1	Gabriela Dabrowski (CAN) ✓ Luisa Stefani (BRA)✓	8,495	16
2	Taylor Townsend (USA) ✓ Kateřina Siniaková (CZE) ✓	8,370	9
3	Aleksandra Krunic (SRB) No; Anna Danilina (KAZ) No	5,638	14
4	Kristina Mladenovic (FRA) ✓ Guo Hanyu (CHN) ✓	3,976	12
5	Nicole Melichar-Martinez (USA) ✓ Cristina Bucsa (ESP) ✓	3,740	16
6	Hsieh Su-wei (TPE) ✓ Jelena Ostapenko (LAT) ✓	3,328	9
7	Demi Schuurs (NED) ✓ Ellen Perez (AUS) ✓	3,130	22
8	Zhang Shuai (CHN) ✓ Elise Mertens (BEL) ✓	3,018	9
9	Sara Errani (ITA) ✓ Jasmine Paolini (ITA) ✓	2,917	12
10	Olivia Nicholls (GBR); Tereza Mihalíková (SVK)	2,560	24

✓ Qualified for the 2026 WTA Finals.
No Qualifiers who withdrew indicated in italics.

[ · ]

WTA rankings (doubles) as of 16 November 2026
No.	Player	Points	Move
1	Kateřina Siniaková (CZE)	11,960	Steady
2	Taylor Townsend (USA)	9,920	Steady
3	Gabriela Dabrowski (CAN)	8,845	Steady
=	Luisa Stefani (BRA)	8,845	Steady
5	Zhang Shuai (CHN)	6,575	Steady
6	Aleksandra Krunić (SRB)	6,030	Steady
7	Anna Danilina (KAZ)	5,930	Steady
8	Kristina Mladenovic (FRA)	4,960	▲1
9	Sara Errani (ITA)	4,900	▲3
10	Nicole Melichar-Martinez (USA)	4,855	▼2
11	Cristina Bucșa (ESP)	4,405	Steady
12	Elise Mertens (BEL)	4,403	▼2
13	Guo Hanyu (CHN)	4,375	▲1
14	Hsieh Su-wei (TPE)	4,070	▼1
15	Jeļena Ostapenko (LAT)	3,925	Steady
16	Jasmine Paolini (ITA)	3,916	▲9
17	Vera Zvonareva	3,707	▼1
18	Diana Shnaider	3,423	▼1
19	Aldila Sutjiadi (INA)	3,413	▼1
20	Storm Hunter (AUS)	3,335	▼1

=== Points breakdown ===
- as of 14 September 2026
- Points from WTA 125 and ITF tournaments are not shown.
- Points from WTA 500 and WTA 250 tournaments in which the player received 0 points, are not shown.
- Points in brackets () don't count to total points by reason of tournament limit.

Rank	Player	Grand Slam				WTA 1000										Best other					WTA Finals	Tourn	Total points
Rank	Player	AUS	FRA	WIM	USO	DO	DU	IW	MI	MA	IT	CA	CI	BE	WU	1	2	3	4	5	WTA Finals	Tourn	Total points
1	(Kazakhstan) Elena Rybakina	W 2000	R64; 70	R32; 130	W 2000	QF; 215	R16; 120	F 650	SF; 390	R16; 120	QF; 215	F 650	QF; 215	R64 (10)	A 0	W 500	W 500	QF; 108	SF; 195	QF; 108	W 1500	21	9,901
2	Aryna Sabalenka	F 1300	QF; 430	R16; 240	F 1300	A 0	A 0	W 1000	W 1000	QF; 215	R32; 65	R16; 120	R16; 120	R32; 65	R32; 10	W 500	SF; 195				F 1000	14	7,875
3	(United States) Jessica Pegula	SF; 780	R128; 10	QF; 430	SF; 780	A 0	W 1000	QF; 215	QF; 215	R32; 65	QF; 215	R16; 120	F 650	A 0	R32; 10	W 500	F 325	SF; 195	F 325		SF; 400	18	7,265
4	(United States) Coco Gauff	QF; 430	R32; 130	SF; 780	SF; 780	R32; 10	SF; 390	R32; 65	F 650	R16; 120	F 650	SF; 390	W 1000	R16; 120	A 0	SF; 150	QF; 108	R32; 1			RR; 200	18	7,244
5	Mirra Andreeva	R16; 240	W 2000	R64; 70	QF; 430	R16; 120	QF; 215	R32; 65	R16; 120	F 650	QF; 215	R32; 65	R16; 120	F 650	A 0	W 500	W 500	SF; 195	QF; 108	R16 (1)	DNQ	20	5,743
6	(Czech Republic) Linda Noskova	R32; 130	R128; 10	W 2000	QF; 430	R32; 65	R32; 65	SF; 390	R64; 10	QF; 215	R16; 120	R64; 10	R16; 120	R16; 120	A 0	R32 (1)	W 500	QF; 108	R16; 60	F 325	DNQ	17	5,328
7	(Ukraine) Elina Svitolina	SF; 780	QF; 430	R128; 10	R32; 130	R16; 120	F 650	SF; 390	R32; 65	R64; 10	W 1000	SF; 390	R32; 65	QF; 215	QF; 215	W 250	SF; 195	QF; 108	QF; 108	QF; 108	DNQ	17	4,809
8	(Czech Republic) Karolina Muchova	R16; 240	R32; 130	F 1300	R32; 130	W 1000	A 0	R16; 120	SF; 390	A 0	R64; 10	A 0	A 0	QF; 215	R16; 120	W 500	R16; 60	F 325	QF; 108	SF; 195	DNQ	16	4683
9	(Poland) Iga Świątek	QF; 430	R16; 240	R32; 130	R16; 240	QF; 215	A 0	QF; 215	R64; 10	R32; 65	SF; 390	W 1000	SF; 390	QF; 215	SF; 390	W 500	W 150	QF; 108	R16; 1		RR; 200	18	4619
10	(Ukraine) Marta Kostyuk	R128; 10	SF; 780	SF; 780	R16; 240	A 0	A 0	R32; 65	R32; 65	W 1000	A 0	R16; 120	QF; 215	A 0	R32; 10	F 325	W 250				DNQ	13	3,980

- Players have the option to replace 1000 and Grand Slam event points with points from other tournaments.

== Number one ranked players ==
The following is a chronological list of players who have achieved the number one position in singles since the WTA began producing computerized rankings on November 3, 1975:

Current world No. 1 as of 14 September 2026.
Active players in green

No.	Player	Date reached	Total weeks
1	(United States) Chris Evert	Nov 3, 1975	260
2	(Australia) Evonne Goolagong Cawley	Apr 26, 1976	2
3	(Czechoslovakia) / (United States) Martina Navratilova	Jul 10, 1978	332
4	(United States) Tracy Austin	Apr 7, 1980	21
5	(Germany) Steffi Graf	Aug 17, 1987	377
6	(Socialist Federal Republic of Yugoslavia) / (Federal Republic of Yugoslavia) / (United States) Monica Seles	Mar 11, 1991	178
7	(Spain) Arantxa Sánchez Vicario	Feb 6, 1995	12
8	(Switzerland) Martina Hingis	Mar 31, 1997	209
9	(United States) Lindsay Davenport	Oct 12, 1998	98
10	(United States) Jennifer Capriati	Oct 15, 2001	17
11	(United States) Venus Williams	Feb 25, 2002	11
12	(United States) Serena Williams	Jul 8, 2002	319
13	(Belgium) Kim Clijsters	Aug 11, 2003	20
14	(Belgium) Justine Henin	Oct 20, 2003	117
15	(France) Amélie Mauresmo	Sep 13, 2004	39
16	(Russia) Maria Sharapova	Aug 22, 2005	21
17	(Serbia) Ana Ivanovic	Jun 9, 2008	12
18	(Serbia) Jelena Janković	Aug 11, 2008	18
19	(Russia) Dinara Safina	Apr 20, 2009	26
20	(Denmark) Caroline Wozniacki	Oct 11, 2010	71
21	(Belarus) Victoria Azarenka	Jan 30, 2012	51
22	(Germany) Angelique Kerber	Sep 12, 2016	34
23	(Czech Republic) Karolína Plíšková	July 17, 2017	8
24	(Spain) Garbiñe Muguruza	Sep 11, 2017	4
25	(Romania) Simona Halep	Oct 9, 2017	64
26	(Japan) Naomi Osaka	Jan 28, 2019	25
27	(Australia) Ashleigh Barty	Jun 24, 2019	121
28	(Poland) Iga Świątek	Apr 4, 2022	125
29	Aryna Sabalenka	Sep 11, 2023	107
30	(Kazakhstan) Elena Rybakina	Sep 14, 2026	10

== Year-end number one players ==
The year-end number one player is the player at the head of the WTA rankings following the completion of the final tournament of the calendar year.

=== Singles ===
Year	Player
1975	(United States) Chris Evert (1)
1976	(United States) Chris Evert
1977	(United States) Chris Evert
1978	(United States) Martina Navratilova (2)
1979	(United States) Martina Navratilova
1980	(United States) Chris Evert
1981	(United States) Chris Evert
1982	(United States) Martina Navratilova
1983	(United States) Martina Navratilova
1984	(United States) Martina Navratilova
1985	(United States) Martina Navratilova
1986	(United States) Martina Navratilova
1987	(West Germany) Steffi Graf (3)
1988	(West Germany) Steffi Graf
1989	(West Germany) Steffi Graf
1990	(Germany) Steffi Graf
1991	(Socialist Federal Republic of Yugoslavia) Monica Seles (4)
1992	(Socialist Federal Republic of Yugoslavia) Monica Seles
1993	(Germany) Steffi Graf
1994	(Germany) Steffi Graf
1995	(Germany) Steffi Graf (United States) Monica Seles
1996	(Germany) Steffi Graf
1997	(Switzerland) Martina Hingis (5)
1998	(United States) Lindsay Davenport (6)
1999	(Switzerland) Martina Hingis

Year	Player
2000	(Switzerland) Martina Hingis
2001	(United States) Lindsay Davenport
2002	(United States) Serena Williams (7)
2003	(Belgium) Justine Henin (8)
2004	(United States) Lindsay Davenport
2005	(United States) Lindsay Davenport
2006	(Belgium) Justine Henin
2007	(Belgium) Justine Henin
2008	(Serbia) Jelena Janković (9)
2009	(United States) Serena Williams
2010	(Denmark) Caroline Wozniacki (10)
2011	(Denmark) Caroline Wozniacki
2012	(Belarus) Victoria Azarenka (11)
2013	(United States) Serena Williams
2014	(United States) Serena Williams
2015	(United States) Serena Williams
2016	(Germany) Angelique Kerber (12)
2017	(Romania) Simona Halep (13)
2018	(Romania) Simona Halep
2019	(Australia) Ashleigh Barty (14)
2020	(Australia) Ashleigh Barty
2021	(Australia) Ashleigh Barty
2022	(Poland) Iga Świątek (15)
2023	(Poland) Iga Świątek
2024	Aryna Sabalenka (16)
2025	Aryna Sabalenka
2026	(Kazakhstan) Elena Rybakina

No. 1 all weeks of the year

=== Doubles ===
Year	Country	Player	Team
1984	(United States) USA	Martina Navratilova (1)	(United States) Martina Navratilova / (United States) Pam Shriver
1985	(United States) USA	Pam Shriver (2)	(United States) Martina Navratilova / (United States) Pam Shriver
1986	(United States) USA	Martina Navratilova	(United States) Martina Navratilova / (United States) Pam Shriver
1987	(United States) USA	Martina Navratilova	(United States) Martina Navratilova / (United States) Pam Shriver
1988	(United States) USA	Martina Navratilova	(United States) Martina Navratilova / (United States) Pam Shriver
1989	(United States) USA	Martina Navratilova	(Czechoslovakia) Helena Suková / (Czechoslovakia) Jana Novotná
1990	(Czechoslovakia) TCH	Helena Suková (3)	(Czechoslovakia) Helena Suková / (Czechoslovakia) Jana Novotná
1991	(Czechoslovakia) TCH	Jana Novotná (4)	(United States) Gigi Fernández / (Czechoslovakia) Jana Novotná
1992	(Czechoslovakia) TCH	Helena Suková	(Latvia) Larisa Neiland / (Belarus) Natasha Zvereva
1993	(United States) USA	Gigi Fernández (5)	(United States) Gigi Fernández / (Belarus) Natasha Zvereva
1994	(Belarus) BLR	Natasha Zvereva (6)	(United States) Gigi Fernández / (Belarus) Natasha Zvereva
1995	(Spain) ESP	Arantxa Sánchez Vicario (7)	(United States) Gigi Fernández / (Belarus) Natasha Zvereva
1996	(Spain) ESP	Arantxa Sánchez Vicario	(Czech Republic) Jana Novotná / (Spain) Arantxa Sánchez Vicario
1997	(Belarus) BLR	Natasha Zvereva	(United States) Gigi Fernández / (Belarus) Natasha Zvereva
1998	(Belarus) BLR	Natasha Zvereva	(Switzerland) Martina Hingis / (Czech Republic) Jana Novotná
1999	(Russia) RUS	Anna Kournikova (8)	(Switzerland) Martina Hingis / (Russia) Anna Kournikova
2000	(Japan) JPN	Ai Sugiyama (9)	(United States) Serena Williams / (United States) Venus Williams
2001	(United States) USA	Lisa Raymond (10)	(United States) Lisa Raymond / (Australia) Rennae Stubbs
2002	(Argentina) ARG	Paola Suárez (11)	(Spain) Virginia Ruano Pascual / (Argentina) Paola Suárez
2003	(Argentina) ARG	Paola Suárez	(Spain) Virginia Ruano Pascual / (Argentina) Paola Suárez
2004	(Spain) ESP	Virginia Ruano Pascual (12)	(Spain) Virginia Ruano Pascual / (Argentina) Paola Suárez
2005	(Zimbabwe) ZIM	Cara Black (13)	(United States) Lisa Raymond / (Australia) Samantha Stosur
2006	(United States) USA (Australia) AUS	Lisa Raymond; Samantha Stosur (14)	(United States) Lisa Raymond / (Australia) Samantha Stosur
2007	(Zimbabwe) ZIM (United States) USA	Cara Black; Liezel Huber (15)	(Zimbabwe) Cara Black / (United States) Liezel Huber
2008	(Zimbabwe) ZIM (United States) USA	Cara Black; Liezel Huber	(Zimbabwe) Cara Black / (United States) Liezel Huber
2009	(Zimbabwe) ZIM (United States) USA	Cara Black; Liezel Huber	(United States) Serena Williams / (United States) Venus Williams
2010	(Argentina) ARG	Gisela Dulko (16)	(Argentina) Gisela Dulko / (Italy) Flavia Pennetta
2011	(United States) USA	Liezel Huber	(Czech Republic) Květa Peschke / (Slovenia) Katarina Srebotnik
2012	(Italy) ITA	Roberta Vinci (17)	(Italy) Sara Errani / (Italy) Roberta Vinci
2013	(Italy) ITA	Roberta Vinci	(Italy) Sara Errani / (Italy) Roberta Vinci
2013	(Italy) ITA	Sara Errani (18)	(Italy) Sara Errani / (Italy) Roberta Vinci
2014	(Italy) ITA; ITA	Roberta Vinci; Sara Errani	(Italy) Sara Errani / (Italy) Roberta Vinci
2015	(India) IND	Sania Mirza (19)	(Switzerland) Martina Hingis / (India) Sania Mirza
2016	IND	Sania Mirza	(France) Caroline Garcia / (France) Kristina Mladenovic
2017	(Chinese Taipei) TPE (Switzerland) SUI	Latisha Chan (20); Martina Hingis (21)	(Chinese Taipei) Latisha Chan / (Switzerland) Martina Hingis
2018	CZE; CZE	Barbora Krejčíková (22); Kateřina Siniaková (23)	(Czech Republic) Barbora Krejčíková / (Czech Republic) Kateřina Siniaková
2019	CZE	Barbora Strýcová (24)	(Chinese Taipei) Hsieh Su-wei / (Czech Republic) Barbora Strýcová
2020	TPE	Hsieh Su-wei (25)	(Chinese Taipei) Hsieh Su-wei / (Czech Republic) Barbora Strýcová
2021	CZE	Kateřina Siniaková	(Czech Republic) Barbora Krejčíková / (Czech Republic) Kateřina Siniaková
2022	CZE	Kateřina Siniaková	(Czech Republic) Barbora Krejčíková / (Czech Republic) Kateřina Siniaková
2023	AUS	Storm Hunter (26)	(Australia) Storm Hunter / (Belgium) Elise Mertens
2024	CZE	Kateřina Siniaková	(Canada) Gabriela Dabrowski / (New Zealand) Erin Routliffe
2025	CZE	Kateřina Siniaková	(Italy) Sara Errani / (Italy) Jasmine Paolini

No. 1 all weeks of the year

== Year-end Top 10 ==
★ indicates player's highest year-end ranking

Year	No. 1	No. 2	No. 3	No. 4	No. 5	No. 6	No. 7	No. 8	No. 9	No. 10
1975	(United States) C. Evert^{★}	(United Kingdom) V. Wade^{★}	(Czechoslovakia) M. Navrátilová	(United States) B.J. King	(Australia) E. Goolagong Cawley	(Australia) M. Court^{★}	(Soviet Union) O. Morozova^{★}	(United States) N. Gunter (Richey)^{★}	(France) F. Dürr^{★}	(Australia) K. Melville Reid
1976	(United States) C. Evert	(Australia) E. Goolagong Cawley^{★}	(United Kingdom) V. Wade	(United States) M. Navratilova	(Australia) D. Fromholtz^{★}	(United States) R. Casals^{★}	(Netherlands) B. Stöve^{★}	(Australia) K. Melville Reid^{★}	(Soviet Union) O. Morozova	(United Kingdom) S. Barker
1977	(United States) C. Evert	(United States) B.J. King^{★}	(United States) M. Navratilova	(United Kingdom) V. Wade	(United Kingdom) S. Barker^{★}	(United States) R. Casals	(Netherlands) B. Stöve	(Australia) D. Fromholtz	(Australia) W. Turnbull	(Australia) K. Melville Reid
1978	(United States) M. Navratilova^{★}	(United States) C. Evert	(Australia) E. Goolagong Cawley	(United Kingdom) V. Wade	(United States) B.J. King	(United States) T. Austin	(Australia) W. Turnbull	(Australia) K. Melville Reid	(Netherlands) B. Stöve	(Australia) D. Fromholtz
1979	(United States) M. Navratilova	(United States) C. Evert-Lloyd	(United States) T. Austin	(Australia) E. Goolagong Cawley	(United States) B.J. King	(Australia) D. Fromholtz	(Australia) W. Turnbull	(United Kingdom) V. Wade	(Australia) K. Melville Reid	(United Kingdom) S. Barker
1980	(United States) C. Evert-Lloyd	(United States) T. Austin^{★}	(United States) M. Navratilova	(Czechoslovakia) H. Mandlíková	(Australia) E. Goolagong Cawley	(United States) B.J. King	(United States) A. Jaeger	(Australia) W. Turnbull	(United States) P. Shriver	(South Africa) G. Stevens^{★}
1981	(United States) C. Evert-Lloyd	(United States) T. Austin	(United States) M. Navratilova	(United States) A. Jaeger	(Czechoslovakia) H. Mandlíková	(West Germany) S. Hanika	(United States) P. Shriver	(Australia) W. Turnbull	(West Germany) B. Bunge	(United States) B. Potter
1982	(United States) M. Navratilova	(United States) C. Evert-Lloyd	(United States) A. Jaeger^{★}	(United States) T. Austin	(Australia) W. Turnbull^{★}	(United States) P. Shriver	(Czechoslovakia) H. Mandlíková	(United States) B. Potter^{★}	(West Germany) B. Bunge	(West Germany) S. Hanika
1983	(United States) M. Navratilova	(United States) C. Evert-Lloyd	(United States) A. Jaeger	(United States) P. Shriver^{★}	(West Germany) S. Hanika^{★}	(United Kingdom) J. Durie^{★}	(West Germany) B. Bunge^{★}	(Australia) W. Turnbull	(United States) T. Austin	(United States) Z. Garrison
1984	(United States) M. Navratilova	(United States) C. Evert-Lloyd	(Czechoslovakia) H. Mandlíková^{★}	(United States) P. Shriver	(Australia) W. Turnbull	(Bulgaria) Man Maleeva^{★}	(Czechoslovakia) H. Suková	(West Germany) C. Kohde-Kilsch	(United States) Z. Garrison	(United States) K. Jordan^{★}
1985	(United States) M. Navratilova	(United States) C. Evert-Lloyd	(Czechoslovakia) H. Mandlíková	(United States) P. Shriver	(West Germany) C. Kohde-Kilsch^{★}	(West Germany) S. Graf	(Bulgaria) Man Maleeva	(United States) Z. Garrison	(Czechoslovakia) H. Suková	(United States) B. Gadusek^{★}
1986	(United States) M. Navratilova	(United States) C. Evert-Lloyd	(West Germany) S. Graf	(Czechoslovakia) H. Mandlíková	(Czechoslovakia) H. Suková^{★}	(United States) P. Shriver	(West Germany) C. Kohde-Kilsch	(Bulgaria) Man Maleeva	(United States) K. Rinaldi^{★}	(Argentina) G. Sabatini
1987	(West Germany) S. Graf^{★}	(United States) M. Navratilova	(United States) C. Evert	(United States) P. Shriver	(Czechoslovakia) H. Mandlíková	(Argentina) G. Sabatini	(Czechoslovakia) H. Suková	(Bulgaria) Man Maleeva	(United States) Z. Garrison	(West Germany) C. Kohde-Kilsch
1988	(West Germany) S. Graf	(United States) M. Navratilova	(United States) C. Evert	(Argentina) G. Sabatini	(United States) P. Shriver	(Bulgaria) Man Maleeva-Fragnière	(Soviet Union) N. Zvereva^{★}	(Czechoslovakia) H. Suková	(United States) Z. Garrison	(United States) B. Potter
1989	(West Germany) S. Graf	(United States) M. Navratilova	(Argentina) G. Sabatini^{★}	(United States) Z. Garrison^{★}	(Spain) A. Sánchez Vicario	(Socialist Federal Republic of Yugoslavia) M. Seles	(Spain) C. Martínez	(Czechoslovakia) H. Suková	(Bulgaria) Man Maleeva-Fragnière	(United States) C. Evert
1990	(Germany) S. Graf	(Socialist Federal Republic of Yugoslavia) M. Seles	(United States) M. Navratilova	(United States) M.J. Fernández^{★}	(Argentina) G. Sabatini	(Bulgaria) K. Maleeva^{★}	(Spain) A. Sánchez Vicario	(United States) J. Capriati	(Switzerland) Man Maleeva-Fragnière	(United States) Z. Garrison
1991	(Socialist Federal Republic of Yugoslavia) M. Seles^{★}	(Germany) S. Graf	(Argentina) G. Sabatini	(United States) M. Navratilova	(Spain) A. Sánchez Vicario	(United States) J. Capriati	(Czechoslovakia) J. Novotná	(United States) M.J. Fernández	(Spain) C. Martínez	(Switzerland) Man Maleeva-Fragnière
1992	(Federal Republic of Yugoslavia) M. Seles	(Germany) S. Graf	(Argentina) G. Sabatini	(Spain) A. Sánchez Vicario	(United States) M. Navratilova	(United States) M.J. Fernández	(United States) J. Capriati	(Spain) C. Martínez	(Switzerland) Man Maleeva-Fragnière	(Czechoslovakia) J. Novotná
1993	(Germany) S. Graf	(Spain) A. Sánchez Vicario^{★}	(United States) M. Navratilova	(Spain) C. Martínez	(Argentina) G. Sabatini	(Czech Republic) J. Novotná	(United States) M.J. Fernández	(Federal Republic of Yugoslavia) M. Seles	(United States) J. Capriati	(Germany) A. Huber
1994	(Germany) S. Graf	(Spain) A. Sánchez Vicario	(Spain) C. Martínez	(Czech Republic) J. Novotná	(France) M. Pierce^{★}	(United States) L. Davenport	(Argentina) G. Sabatini	(United States) M. Navratilova	(Japan) K. Date	(Belarus) N. Zvereva
1995	(Germany) S. Graf (United States) M. Seles	(Spain) C. Martínez^{★}	(Spain) A. Sánchez Vicario	(Japan) K. Date^{★}	(France) M. Pierce	(Bulgaria) Mag Maleeva^{★}	(Argentina) G. Sabatini	(United States) M.J. Fernández	(Croatia) I. Majoli	(Germany) A. Huber
1996	(Germany) S. Graf	(United States) M. Seles (Spain) A. Sánchez Vicario	(Czech Republic) J. Novotná	(Switzerland) M. Hingis	(Spain) C. Martínez	(Germany) A. Huber^{★}	(Croatia) I. Majoli	(Japan) K. Date	(United States) L. Davenport	(Austria) B. Paulus^{★}
1997	(Switzerland) M. Hingis^{★}	(Czech Republic) J. Novotná^{★}	(United States) L. Davenport	(South Africa) A. Coetzer^{★}	(United States) M. Seles	(Croatia) I. Majoli^{★}	(France) M. Pierce	(Romania) I. Spîrlea^{★}	(Spain) A. Sánchez Vicario	(United States) M.J. Fernández
1998	(United States) L. Davenport^{★}	(Switzerland) M. Hingis	(Czech Republic) J. Novotná	(Spain) A. Sánchez Vicario	(United States) V. Williams	(United States) M. Seles	(France) M. Pierce	(Spain) C. Martínez	(Germany) S. Graf	(France) N. Tauziat
1999	(Switzerland) M. Hingis	(United States) L. Davenport	(United States) V. Williams	(United States) S. Williams	(France) M. Pierce	(United States) M. Seles	(France) N. Tauziat^{★}	(Austria) B. Schett^{★}	(France) J. Halard-Decugis^{★}	(France) A. Mauresmo
2000	(Switzerland) M. Hingis	(United States) L. Davenport	(United States) V. Williams	(United States) M. Seles	(Spain) C. Martínez	(United States) S. Williams	(France) M. Pierce	(Russia) A. Kournikova^{★}	(Spain) A. Sánchez Vicario	(France) N. Tauziat
2001	(United States) L. Davenport	(United States) J. Capriati^{★}	(United States) V. Williams	(Switzerland) M. Hingis	(Belgium) K. Clijsters	(United States) S. Williams	(Belgium) J. Henin	(Federal Republic of Yugoslavia) J. Dokić^{★}	(France) A. Mauresmo	(United States) M. Seles
2002	(United States) S. Williams^{★}	(United States) V. Williams^{★}	(United States) J. Capriati	(Belgium) K. Clijsters	(Belgium) J. Henin	(France) A. Mauresmo	(United States) M. Seles	(Slovakia) D. Hantuchová^{★}	(Federal Republic of Yugoslavia) J. Dokić	(Switzerland) M. Hingis
2003	(Belgium) J. Henin-Hardenne^{★}	(Belgium) K. Clijsters^{★}	(United States) S. Williams	(France) A. Mauresmo	(United States) L. Davenport	(United States) J. Capriati	(Russia) A. Myskina	(Russia) E. Dementieva	(United States) C. Rubin^{★}	(Japan) A. Sugiyama^{★}
2004	(United States) L. Davenport	(France) A. Mauresmo^{★}	(Russia) A. Myskina^{★}	(Russia) M. Sharapova	(Russia) S. Kuznetsova	(Russia) E. Dementieva	(United States) S. Williams	(Belgium) J. Henin-Hardenne	(United States) V. Williams	(United States) J. Capriati
2005	(United States) L. Davenport	(Belgium) K. Clijsters	(France) A. Mauresmo	(Russia) M. Sharapova	(France) M. Pierce	(Belgium) J. Henin-Hardenne	(Switzerland) P. Schnyder^{★}	(Russia) E. Dementieva	(Russia) N. Petrova	(United States) V. Williams
2006	(Belgium) J. Henin-Hardenne	(Russia) M. Sharapova^{★}	(France) A. Mauresmo	(Russia) S. Kuznetsova	(Belgium) K. Clijsters	(Russia) N. Petrova^{★}	(Switzerland) M. Hingis	(Russia) E. Dementieva	(Switzerland) P. Schnyder	(Czech Republic) N. Vaidišová^{★}
2007	(Belgium) J. Henin	(Russia) S. Kuznetsova^{★}	(Serbia) J. Janković	(Serbia) A. Ivanovic^{★}	(Russia) M. Sharapova	(Russia) A. Chakvetadze^{★}	(United States) S. Williams	(United States) V. Williams	(Slovakia) D. Hantuchová	(France) M. Bartoli
2008	(Serbia) J. Janković^{★}	(United States) S. Williams	(Russia) D. Safina	(Russia) E. Dementieva^{★}	(Serbia) A. Ivanovic	(United States) V. Williams	(Russia) V. Zvonareva	(Russia) S. Kuznetsova	(Russia) M. Sharapova	(Poland) A. Radwańska
2009	(United States) S. Williams	(Russia) D. Safina^{★}	(Russia) S. Kuznetsova	(Denmark) C. Wozniacki	(Russia) E. Dementieva	(United States) V. Williams	(Belarus) V. Azarenka	(Serbia) J. Janković	(Russia) V. Zvonareva	(Poland) A. Radwańska
2010	(Denmark) C. Wozniacki^{★}	(Russia) V. Zvonareva^{★}	(Belgium) K. Clijsters	(United States) S. Williams	(United States) V. Williams	(Australia) S. Stosur^{★}	(Italy) F. Schiavone^{★}	(Serbia) J. Janković	(Russia) E. Dementieva	(Belarus) V. Azarenka
2011	(Denmark) C. Wozniacki	(Czech Republic) P. Kvitová^{★}	(Belarus) V. Azarenka	(Russia) M. Sharapova	(China) N. Li	(Australia) S. Stosur	(Russia) V. Zvonareva	(Poland) A. Radwańska	(France) M. Bartoli^{★}	(Germany) A. Petkovic^{★}
2012	(Belarus) V. Azarenka^{★}	(Russia) M. Sharapova	(United States) S. Williams	(Poland) A. Radwańska	(Germany) A. Kerber	(Italy) S. Errani^{★}	(China) N. Li	(Czech Republic) P. Kvitová	(Australia) S. Stosur	(Denmark) C. Wozniacki
2013	(United States) S. Williams	(Belarus) V. Azarenka	(China) N. Li^{★}	(Russia) M. Sharapova	(Poland) A. Radwańska	(Czech Republic) P. Kvitová	(Italy) S. Errani	(Serbia) J. Janković	(Germany) A. Kerber	(Denmark) C. Wozniacki
2014	(United States) S. Williams	(Russia) M. Sharapova	(Romania) S. Halep	(Czech Republic) P. Kvitová	(Serbia) A. Ivanovic	(Poland) A. Radwańska	(Canada) E. Bouchard^{★}	(Denmark) C. Wozniacki	(China) N. Li	(Germany) A. Kerber
2015	(United States) S. Williams	(Romania) S. Halep	(Spain) G. Muguruza	(Russia) M. Sharapova	(Poland) A. Radwańska	(Czech Republic) P. Kvitová	(United States) V. Williams	(Italy) F. Pennetta^{★}	(Czech Republic) L. Šafářová^{★}	(Germany) A. Kerber
2016	(Germany) A. Kerber^{★}	(United States) S. Williams	(Poland) A. Radwańska^{★}	(Romania) S. Halep	(Slovakia) D. Cibulková^{★}	(Czech Republic) K. Plíšková	(Spain) G. Muguruza	(United States) M. Keys	(Russia) S. Kuznetsova	(United Kingdom) J. Konta
2017	(Romania) S. Halep^{★}	(Spain) G. Muguruza^{★}	(Denmark) C. Wozniacki	(Czech Republic) K. Plíšková	(United States) V. Williams	(Ukraine) E. Svitolina	(Latvia) J. Ostapenko^{★}	(France) C. Garcia	(United Kingdom) J. Konta^{★}	(United States) C. Vandeweghe^{★}
2018	(Romania) S. Halep	(Germany) A. Kerber	(Denmark) C. Wozniacki	(Ukraine) E. Svitolina^{★}	(Japan) N. Osaka	(United States) S. Stephens^{★}	(Czech Republic) P. Kvitová	(Czech Republic) K. Plíšková	(Netherlands) K. Bertens^{★}	(Russia) D. Kasatkina
2019	(Australia) A. Barty	(Czech Republic) K. Plíšková^{★}	(Japan) N. Osaka^{★}	(Romania) S. Halep	(Canada) B. Andreescu^{★}	(Ukraine) E. Svitolina	(Czech Republic) P. Kvitová	(Switzerland) B. Bencic^{★}	(Netherlands) K. Bertens	(United States) S. Williams
2020	(Australia) A. Barty	(Romania) S. Halep	(Japan) N. Osaka	(United States) S. Kenin^{★}	(Ukraine) E. Svitolina	(Czech Republic) K. Plíšková	(Canada) B. Andreescu	(Czech Republic) P. Kvitová	(Netherlands) K. Bertens	(Belarus) A. Sabalenka
2021	(Australia) A. Barty	(Belarus) A. Sabalenka	(Spain) G. Muguruza	(Czech Republic) K. Plíšková	(Czech Republic) B. Krejčíková^{★}	(Greece) M. Sakkari^{★}	(Estonia) A. Kontaveit^{★}	(Spain) P. Badosa^{★}	(Poland) I. Świątek	(Tunisia) O. Jabeur
2022	(Poland) I. Świątek^{★}	(Tunisia) O. Jabeur^{★}	(United States) J. Pegula^{★}	(France) C. Garcia^{★}	A. Sabalenka	(Greece) M. Sakkari	(United States) C. Gauff	D. Kasatkina^{★}	V. Kudermetova^{★}	(Romania) S. Halep
2023	(Poland) I. Świątek	A. Sabalenka	(United States) C. Gauff^{★}	(Kazakhstan) E. Rybakina	(United States) J. Pegula	(Tunisia) O. Jabeur	(Czech Republic) M. Vondroušová^{★}	(Czech Republic) K. Muchová^{★}	(Greece) M. Sakkari	(Czech Republic) B. Krejčíková
2024	A. Sabalenka^{★}	(Poland) I. Świątek	(United States) C. Gauff	(Italy) J. Paolini^{★}	(China) Q. Zheng^{★}	(Kazakhstan) E. Rybakina	(United States) J. Pegula	(United States) E. Navarro^{★}	D. Kasatkina	(Czech Republic) B. Krejčíková
2025	A. Sabalenka	(Poland) I. Świątek	(United States) C. Gauff	(United States) A. Anisimova^{★}	(Kazakhstan) E. Rybakina	(United States) J. Pegula	(United States) M. Keys^{★}	(Italy) J. Paolini	M. Andreeva	E. Alexandrova^{★}
2026	(Kazakhstan) E. Rybakina^{★}	M. Andreeva^{★}	A. Sabalenka	(United States) C. Gauff	(United States) J. Pegula	(Ukraine) E. Svitolina	(Czech Republic) L. Nosková^{★}	(Czech Republic) K. Muchová	(Poland) I. Świątek	(Ukraine) M. Kostyuk^{★}

== Players with highest career rank 2–5 ==
The following is a list of singles players who were ranked world No. 5 or higher but not No. 1 since November 3, 1975:

Active players in green

World No. 2
Player	Date reached
(United Kingdom) Virginia Wade	Nov 3, 1975
(United States) Billie Jean King	Dec 11, 1977
(United States) Andrea Jaeger	Aug 17, 1981
(Spain) Conchita Martínez	Oct 30, 1995
(Czech Republic) Jana Novotná	Jul 7, 1997
(Russia) Anastasia Myskina	Sep 13, 2004
(Russia) Svetlana Kuznetsova	Sep 10, 2007
(Russia) Vera Zvonareva	Oct 25, 2010
(Czech Republic) Petra Kvitová	Oct 31, 2011
(Poland) Agnieszka Radwańska	Jul 9, 2012
(China) Li Na	Feb 17, 2014
(Czech Republic) Barbora Krejčíková	Feb 28, 2022
(Spain) Paula Badosa	Apr 25, 2022
(Estonia) Anett Kontaveit	Jun 6, 2022
(Tunisia) Ons Jabeur	Jun 27, 2022
(United States) Coco Gauff	Jun 10, 2024
Mirra Andreeva	Nov 16, 2026

World No. 3
Player	Date reached
(United States) Pam Shriver	Mar 20, 1984
(Czechoslovakia) / (Australia) Hana Mandlíková	Apr 30, 1984
(Australia) Wendy Turnbull	Jan 7, 1985
(Bulgaria) / (Switzerland) Manuela Maleeva	Feb 4, 1985
(Argentina) Gabriela Sabatini	Feb 27, 1989
(France) Mary Pierce	Jan 30, 1995
(South Africa) Amanda Coetzer	Nov 3, 1997
(France) Nathalie Tauziat	May 8, 2000
(Russia) Nadia Petrova	May 15, 2006
(Russia) Elena Dementieva	Apr 6, 2009
(Ukraine) Elina Svitolina	Sep 11, 2017
(United States) Sloane Stephens	Jul 16, 2018
(Greece) Maria Sakkari	Mar 21, 2022
(United States) Jessica Pegula	Oct 24, 2022
(United States) Amanda Anisimova	Jan 5, 2026

World No. 4
Player	Date reached
(United Kingdom) Sue Barker	Mar 20, 1977
(Australia) Dianne Fromholtz	Mar 19, 1979
(Czechoslovakia) Helena Suková	Mar 18, 1985
(West Germany) Claudia Kohde-Kilsch	Sep 2, 1985
(United States) Zina Garrison	Nov 20, 1989
(United States) Mary Joe Fernández	Oct 22, 1990
(Japan) Kimiko Date	May 13, 1995
(Bulgaria) Magdalena Maleeva	Jan 29, 1996
(Croatia) Iva Majoli	Feb 5, 1996
(Germany) Anke Huber	Oct 14, 1996
(Serbia and Montenegro) / (Australia) Jelena Dokić	Aug 19, 2002
(Italy) Francesca Schiavone	Jan 31, 2011
(Australia) Samantha Stosur	Feb 21, 2011
(Slovakia) Dominika Cibulková	Mar 20, 2017
(United Kingdom) Johanna Konta	Jul 17, 2017
(France) Caroline Garcia	Sep 10, 2018
(Netherlands) Kiki Bertens	May 13, 2019
(Canada) Bianca Andreescu	Oct 21, 2019
(Switzerland) Belinda Bencic	Feb 17, 2020
(United States) Sofia Kenin	Mar 9, 2020
(Italy) Jasmine Paolini	Oct 28, 2024
(China) Zheng Qinwen	Jun 16, 2025

World No. 5
Player	Date reached
(United States) Rosemary Casals	Sep 13, 1976
(Australia) Margaret Court	Feb 21, 1977
(Netherlands) Betty Stöve	Jul 3, 1977
(West Germany) Sylvia Hanika	Sep 12, 1983
(United States) Kathy Jordan	Mar 19, 1984
(United Kingdom) Jo Durie	Apr 29, 1984
(Soviet Union) / (Belarus) Natasha Zvereva	May 22, 1989
(Slovakia) Daniela Hantuchová	Jan 27, 2003
(Russia) Anna Chakvetadze	Sep 10, 2007
(Italy) Sara Errani	May 20, 2013
(Canada) Eugenie Bouchard	Oct 20, 2014
(Czech Republic) Lucie Šafářová	Sep 14, 2015
(Latvia) Jeļena Ostapenko	Mar 19, 2018
(United States) Madison Keys	Feb 24, 2025

== Players with highest career rank 6–10 ==
The following is a list of players who were ranked world No. 6 to No. 10 in the period since the 1975 introduction of the WTA rankings.

Active players in green

World No. 6
Player	Date reached
(Socialist Federal Republic of Yugoslavia) Mima Jaušovec	Mar 22, 1982
(Germany) Bettina Bunge	Mar 28, 1983
(Bulgaria) Katerina Maleeva	Jul 9, 1990
(United States) Chanda Rubin	Apr 8, 1996
(Italy) Flavia Pennetta	Sep 28, 2015
(Spain) Carla Suárez Navarro	Feb 29, 2016
(Czech Republic) Markéta Vondroušová	Sep 11, 2023
(Czech Republic) Karolína Muchová	Jul 13, 2026
(Czech Republic) Linda Nosková	Aug 24, 2026

World No. 7
Player	Date reached
(Soviet Union) Olga Morozova	Nov 3, 1975
(Australia) Kerry Melville	Jul 4, 1976
(South Africa) Greer Stevens	Jul 7, 1980
(United States) Barbara Potter	Dec 6, 1982
(Hungary) Andrea Temesvári	Jan 23, 1984
(United States) Kathy Rinaldi	May 26, 1986
(Romania) Irina Spîrlea	Oct 13, 1997
(Austria) Barbara Schett	Sep 13, 1999
(France) Julie Halard-Decugis	Feb 14, 2000
(Switzerland) Patty Schnyder	Nov 14, 2005
(Czech Republic) Nicole Vaidišová	May 14, 2007
(France) Marion Bartoli	Jan 30, 2012
(Italy) Roberta Vinci	May 9, 2016
(United States) Danielle Collins	Jul 11, 2022

World No. 8
Player	Date reached
(United States) Nancy Richey	Nov 3, 1975
(Romania) Virginia Ruzici	May 21, 1979
(United States) Bonnie Gadusek	Jul 9, 1984
(Canada) Carling Bassett-Seguso	Mar 4, 1985
(Russia) Anna Kournikova	Nov 20, 2000
(Japan) Ai Sugiyama	Feb 9, 2004
(Australia) Alicia Molik	Feb 28, 2005
(Russia) Ekaterina Makarova	Apr 6, 2015
(Russia) / (Australia) Daria Kasatkina	Oct 24, 2022
(United States) Emma Navarro	Sep 9, 2024

World No. 9
Player	Date reached
(France) Françoise Dürr	Nov 3, 1975
(United States) Lisa Bonder	Aug 20, 1984
(United States) Lori McNeil	Jul 4, 1988
(Netherlands) Brenda Schultz-McCarthy	May 20, 1996
(Belgium) Dominique Monami	Oct 12, 1998
(France) Sandrine Testud	Feb 7, 2000
(Argentina) Paola Suárez	Jun 7, 2004
(Germany) Andrea Petkovic	Oct 10, 2011
(Switzerland) Timea Bacsinszky	May 16, 2016
(United States) CoCo Vandeweghe	Jan 15, 2018
(Germany) Julia Görges	Aug 20, 2018
Veronika Kudermetova	Oct 24, 2022
(Canada) Victoria Mboko	Mar 16, 2026

World No. 10
Player	Date reached
(United States) Kathy May	Jul 3, 1977
(United States) Kristien Shaw	Aug 21, 1977
(United States) Kathleen Horvath	Jun 11, 1984
(Sweden) Catarina Lindqvist	Apr 15, 1985
(United States) Stephanie Rehe	Mar 13, 1989
(Austria) Barbara Paulus	Nov 18, 1996
(Slovakia) Karina Habšudová	Feb 10, 1997
(Russia) Maria Kirilenko	Jun 10, 2013
(France) Kristina Mladenovic	Oct 23, 2017
(United Kingdom) Emma Raducanu	Jul 11, 2022
(Brazil) Beatriz Haddad Maia	Jun 12, 2023
Ekaterina Alexandrova	Oct 13, 2025
(Ukraine) Marta Kostyuk	Sep 14, 2026

== Consecutive weeks in the Top 10 ==
The below lists the singles players with the most consecutive weeks in the top 10 of the WTA rankings:

Active streaks in green

Player	#
(United States) Martina Navratilova	1000
(United States) Chris Evert	746
(Germany) Steffi Graf	625
(Argentina) Gabriela Sabatini	508
(Switzerland) Manuela Maleeva	477
(United States) Pam Shriver	458
(Spain) Arantxa Sánchez Vicario	429
(Czech Republic) Hana Mandlíková	421
(Romania) Simona Halep	373*
(United States) Lindsay Davenport	333
(Spain) Conchita Martínez	319

* The 20-week period between 23 March 2020 and 10 August 2020, when the WTA rankings were not published due to the COVID-19 pandemic, was not counted.
Last update: As of 27 May 2024

== Number 1 in singles and doubles ==
=== At the same time ===
The below lists the players who were ranked number 1 in both singles and doubles at the same time:

No.	Player	Start Date Singles No.1	End Date Singles No.1	Start Date Doubles No.1	End Date Doubles No.1	Overlapping Period	N. of Weeks Overlapping	N. of Weeks Overlapping – Total
1	(United States) Martina Navratilova	Jun 14, 1982	Jun 09, 1985	Sep 04, 1984	Mar 17, 1985	Sep 04, 1984 – Mar 17, 1985	28	**106**
1	(United States) Martina Navratilova	Nov 25, 1985	Aug 16, 1987	Jan 20, 1986	Jul 20, 1986	Jan 20, 1986 – Jul 20, 1986	26	**106**
1	(United States) Martina Navratilova	Nov 25, 1985	Aug 16, 1987	Aug 18, 1986	Feb 04, 1990	Aug 18, 1986 – Aug 16, 1987	52	**106**
2	(Spain) Arantxa Sánchez Vicario	Feb 06, 1995	Feb 19, 1995	Feb 13, 1995	Feb 26, 1995	Feb 13, 1995 – Feb 19, 1995	1	7
2	(Spain) Arantxa Sánchez Vicario	Feb 27, 1995	Apr 09, 1995	Mar 27, 1995	Nov 05, 1995	Mar 27, 1995 – Apr 09, 1995	2	7
2	(Spain) Arantxa Sánchez Vicario	May 15, 1995	Jun 11, 1995	Mar 27, 1995	Nov 05, 1995	May 15, 1995 – Jun 11, 1995	4	7
3	(Switzerland) Martina Hingis	Mar 31, 1997	Oct 11, 1998	Jun 08, 1998	Aug 08, 1998	Jun 08, 1998 – Aug 08, 1998	8	29
3	(Switzerland) Martina Hingis	Mar 31, 1997	Oct 11, 1998	Aug 17, 1998	Oct 25, 1998	Aug 17, 1998 – Oct 11, 1998	8	29
3	(Switzerland) Martina Hingis	Feb 08, 1999	Jul 04, 1999	Jun 07, 1999	Jul 04, 1999	Jun 07, 1999 – Jul 04, 1999	4	29
3	(Switzerland) Martina Hingis	Aug 09, 1999	Apr 02, 2000	Aug 02, 1999	Aug 22, 1999	Aug 09, 1999 – Aug 22, 1999	2	29
3	(Switzerland) Martina Hingis	Aug 09, 1999	Apr 02, 2000	Jan 31, 2000	Mar 19, 2000	Jan 31, 2000 – Mar 19, 2000	7	29
4	(United States) Lindsay Davenport	Apr 03, 2000	May 7, 2000	Apr 17, 2000	May 07, 2000	Apr 17, 2000 – May 7, 2000	3	3
5	(Belgium) Kim Clijsters	Aug 11, 2003	Oct 19, 2003	Aug 18, 2003	Sep 07, 2003	Aug 18, 2003 – Sep 07, 2003	3	3
6	(United States) Serena Williams	Nov 2, 2009	Oct 10, 2010	Jun 7, 2010	Aug 1, 2010	Jun 7, 2010 – Aug 1, 2010	8	8

=== At any time ===
The below lists the players who were ranked number 1 in both singles and doubles at any time in their career. Date in bold indicates date the feat was achieved.

No.	Player	First Date Singles No.1	Last Date Singles No.1	N. of Weeks Singles No.1	First Date Doubles No.1	Last Date Doubles No.1	N. of Weeks Doubles No.1
1	(United States) Martina Navratilova	Jul 10, 1978	Aug 16, 1987	332	**Sep 04, 1984**	May 13, 1990	237 (Open Era record)
2	(Spain) Arantxa Sánchez Vicario	**Feb 06, 1995**	Jun 11, 1995	12	Oct 19, 1992	Apr 06, 1997	111
3	(Switzerland) Martina Hingis	Mar 31, 1997	Oct 14, 2001	209	**Jun 08, 1998**	Mar 18, 2018	90
4	(United States) Lindsay Davenport	**Oct 12, 1998**	Jan 29, 2006	98	Oct 20, 1997	May 7, 2000	32
5	(Belgium) Kim Clijsters	**Aug 11, 2003**	Feb 20, 2011	20	Aug 04, 2003	Sep 07, 2003	4
6	(United States) Venus Williams	Feb 25, 2002	Jul 07, 2002	11	**Jun 07, 2010**	Aug 01, 2010	8
7	(United States) Serena Williams	Jul 08, 2002	May 14, 2017	319	**Jun 07, 2010**	Aug 01, 2010	8
8	Aryna Sabalenka	**Sep 11, 2023**	Sep 13, 2026	107	Feb 22, 2021	Apr 04, 2021	6

=== Year-end No. 1 ===
The below lists the players who finished the year ranked number 1 in both singles and doubles:

No.	Player	Year
1	(United States) Martina Navratilova	1984
1	(United States) Martina Navratilova (2)	1986

Navratilova also finished number 1 in either ranking list for 8 consecutive seasons: 1982–83 – Singles, 1984 – Singles & Doubles, 1985- Singles, 1986- Singles & Doubles, 1987–89 – Doubles.

No other player has managed to finish number 1 in singles and in doubles (same or different years).

== See also ==
- List of WTA number 1 ranked singles tennis players
- List of WTA number 1 ranked doubles tennis players
- World number 1 ranked female tennis players
- Top ten ranked female tennis players
- Top ten ranked female tennis players (1921–1974)
- WTA Tour records
- WTA Awards
- Lists of tennis records and statistics
- ATP rankings
- Current tennis rankings
