= 2024 Toray Pan Pacific Open – Singles =

Singles
- 2024 Toray Pan Pacific Open

Final
- Champion: (China) Zheng Qinwen
- Runner-up: (United States) Sofia Kenin
- Score: 7–6^{(7–5)}, 6–3

Details
- Draw: 28 (6 Q / 4 WC)
- Seeds: 8

Events
Singles	Doubles
← 2023 ·	Pan Pacific Open	· 2025 →

Zheng Qinwen defeated Sofia Kenin in the final, 7–6^{(7–5)}, 6–3 to win the singles title at the 2024 Toray Pan Pacific Open. It was her fifth WTA Tour singles title and second WTA 500 title.

Veronika Kudermetova was the defending champion, but lost in the first round to Viktoriya Tomova.

== Seeds ==
The top four seeds received a bye into the second round.

1. (China) Zheng Qinwen (champion)
2. (Brazil) Beatriz Haddad Maia (second round, retired)
3. Daria Kasatkina (quarterfinals)
4. Anna Kalinskaya (withdrew)
5. (Spain) Paula Badosa (withdrew)
6. Diana Shnaider (semifinals)
7. (Poland) Magdalena Fręch (first round)
8. (Canada) Leylah Fernandez (quarterfinals)
9. (United Kingdom) Katie Boulter (semifinals)
10. (China) Wang Xinyu (first round)

== Draw ==
=== Key ===
- Q = Qualifier
- WC = Wild card
- LL = Lucky loser
- Alt = Alternate
- ITF = ITF entry
- PR = Protected ranking
- SR = Special ranking
- SE = Special exempt
- JE = Junior exempt
- JR = Junior Accelerator Programme entrant
- CO = College Accelerator Programme entrant
- NG = Next Gen Accelerator Program entrant
- w/o = Walkover
- r = Retired
- d = Defaulted

=== Finals ===
Semifinals
1	(China) Zheng Qinwen	7^{7}	6
6	Diana Shnaider	6^{5}	3
WC	(United States) Sofia Kenin	6	6
9	(United Kingdom) Katie Boulter	4	4

Final
1	(China) Zheng Qinwen	7^{7}	6
WC	(United States) Sofia Kenin	6^{5}	3

=== Top half ===
First round
WC	(United Kingdom) M Stojsavljevic	4	7^{9}	6^{6}
(Japan) M Uchijima	6	6^{7}	7^{8}
(France) V Gracheva	6	7^{7}
Q	(Japan) M Hontama	1	6^{4}
LL	A Sasnovich	7	2	2^{r}
8	(Canada) L Fernandez	5	6	5
(Bulgaria) V Tomova	7^{7}	6
V Kudermetova	6^{3}	3
LL	(Japan) S Saito	1	1
Q	(Japan) S Ishii	6	6
Q	(Turkey) Z Sönmez	1	6	6
7	(Poland) M Fręch	6	4	3

Second round
1	(China) Q Zheng	7	6
(Japan) M Uchijima	5	0
(France) V Gracheva	0	6	5
8	(Canada) L Fernandez	6	3	7
6	D Shnaider	6	6
(Bulgaria) V Tomova	2	2
Q	(Japan) S Ishii	4	6	6
Q	(Turkey) Z Sönmez	6	2	3

Quarterfinals
1	(China) Q Zheng	6	1	6
8	(Canada) L Fernandez	0	6	3
6	D Shnaider	w/o
Q	(Japan) S Ishii

Semifinals
1	(China) Q Zheng	7^{7}	6
6	D Shnaider	6^{5}	3

=== Bottom half ===
First round
10	(China) Xin Wang	1	4
WC	(United States) S Kenin	6	6
WC	(Japan) N Hibino	2	3
LL	(Denmark) C Tauson	6	6
(Italy) E Cocciaretto	3	3
(United States) M Kessler	6	6
9	(United Kingdom) K Boulter	6	6
Q	(Australia) P Hon	1	4
LL	(Japan) K Okamura	7^{7}	6
Q	(United States) H Baptiste	6^{4}	3
WC	(Canada) B Andreescu	7	6
Q	(Japan) M Yamaguchi	5	3

Second round
WC	(United States) S Kenin	6^{8}	6	7^{8}
LL	(Denmark) C Tauson	7^{10}	4	6^{6}
(United States) M Kessler	6	3	1
3	D Kasatkina	3	6	6
9	(United Kingdom) K Boulter	6	6
LL	(Japan) K Okamura	1	2
WC	(Canada) B Andreescu	3
2	(Brazil) B Haddad Maia	0^{r}

Quarterfinals
WC	(United States) S Kenin	6	6
3	D Kasatkina	3	4
9	(United Kingdom) K Boulter	6	6
WC	(Canada) B Andreescu	2	1

Semifinals
WC	(United States) S Kenin	6	6
9	(United Kingdom) K Boulter	4	4

== Qualifying ==
=== Seeds ===
1. (Denmark) Clara Tauson (qualifying competition, lucky loser)
2. (United States) Hailey Baptiste (qualified)
3. (Japan) Mai Hontama (qualified)
4. Aliaksandra Sasnovich (qualifying competition, withdrew, lucky loser)
5. (Australia) Kimberly Birrell (withdrew, still playing in Osaka)
6. (Turkey) Zeynep Sönmez (qualified)
7. (Japan) Sara Saito (qualifying competition, lucky loser)
8. (Australia) Priscilla Hon (qualified)
9. (Japan) Kyōka Okamura (qualifying competition, lucky loser)
10. (Japan) Haruka Kaji (first round)
11. (Japan) Ayano Shimizu (qualifying competition)
12. (Japan) Sayaka Ishii (qualified)

=== Qualifiers ===
1. (Japan) Sayaka Ishii
2. (United States) Hailey Baptiste
3. (Japan) Mai Hontama
4. (Australia) Priscilla Hon
5. (Japan) Mei Yamaguchi
6. (Turkey) Zeynep Sönmez

=== Lucky losers ===
1. (Denmark) Clara Tauson
2. (Japan) Sara Saito
3. (Japan) Kyōka Okamura
4. Aliaksandra Sasnovich

=== Qualifying draw ===
==== First qualifier ====
First round
1	(Denmark) Clara Tauson	6	6
WC	(Japan) Honori Koyama	0	1
WC	(Japan) Sae Noguchi	2	2
12	(Japan) Sayaka Ishii	6	6

Qualifying competition
1	(Denmark) Clara Tauson	6	5	5
12	(Japan) Sayaka Ishii	1	7	7

==== Second qualifier ====
First round
2	(United States) Hailey Baptiste	6	6
(Japan) Ena Koike	4	2
WC	(Japan) Shiho Akita	4	0
9/WC	(Japan) Kyōka Okamura	6	6

Qualifying competition
2	(United States) Hailey Baptiste	6	7
9/WC	(Japan) Kyōka Okamura	3	5

==== Third qualifier ====
First round
3	(Japan) Mai Hontama	6	6
WC	(Japan) Miyu Kato	3	3
(Japan) Miho Kuramochi	7	6^{0}	0^{r}
11	(Japan) Ayano Shimizu	5	7^{7}	1

Qualifying competition
3	(Japan) Mai Hontama	3	6	6
11	(Japan) Ayano Shimizu	6	3	4

==== Fourth qualifier ====
First round
4	Aliaksandra Sasnovich	7^{7}	6
PR	(China) Wang Qiang	6^{4}	0
PR	(China) Zheng Saisai	1	5
8	(Australia) Priscilla Hon	6	7

Qualifying competition
4	Aliaksandra Sasnovich
8	(Australia) Priscilla Hon	w/o

==== Fifth qualifier ====
First round				Qualifying competition
				(Japan) Eri Shimizu	5	1
				(Japan) Mei Yamaguchi	7	6
	(Japan) Mei Yamaguchi	6	6	(Japan) Mei Yamaguchi	7	6
10	(Japan) Haruka Kaji	3	3

==== Sixth qualifier ====
First round
6	(Turkey) Zeynep Sönmez	3	6	6
WC	(Japan) Kanon Yamaguchi	6	0	3
(Japan) Eri Hozumi	3	3
7	(Japan) Sara Saito	6	6

Qualifying competition
6	(Turkey) Zeynep Sönmez	6	6
7	(Japan) Sara Saito	2	3
