= 2025 Toray Pan Pacific Open – Doubles =

Doubles
- 2025 Toray Pan Pacific Open

Final
- Champions: (Hungary) Tímea Babos (Brazil) Luisa Stefani
- Runners-up: (Kazakhstan) Anna Danilina (Serbia) Aleksandra Krunić
- Score: 6–1, 6–4

Details
- Draw: 16
- Seeds: 4

Events
Singles	Doubles
← 2024 ·	Pan Pacific Open	· 2026 →

Tímea Babos and Luisa Stefani defeated Anna Danilina and Aleksandra Krunić in the final, 6–1, 6–4 to win the doubles tennis title at the 2025 Pan Pacific Open.

Shuko Aoyama and Eri Hozumi were the reigning champions, but chose not to compete together this year. Aoyama partnered Cristina Bucșa but lost in the semifinals to Danilina and Krunić. Hozumi partnered Wu Fang-hsien, but lost in the first round to Nicole Melichar-Martinez and Xu Yifan.

== Seeds ==
1. (Australia) Ellen Perez / (United States) Taylor Townsend (semifinals)
2. (United States) Asia Muhammad / (Netherlands) Demi Schuurs (first round)
3. (Kazakhstan) Anna Danilina / (Serbia) Aleksandra Krunić (final)
4. (Hungary) Tímea Babos / (Brazil) Luisa Stefani (champions)

== Draw ==
=== Key ===
- Q = Qualifier
- WC = Wild card
- LL = Lucky loser
- Alt = Alternate
- ITF = ITF entry
- PR = Protected ranking
- SR = Special ranking
- SE = Special exempt
- JE = Junior exempt
- JR = Junior Accelerator Programme entrant
- CO = College Accelerator Programme entrant
- NG = Next Gen Accelerator Program entrant
- w/o = Walkover
- r = Retired
- d = Defaulted

=== Draw ===
First round
1	(Australia) E Perez (United States) T Townsend	6	6
(Australia) S Hunter (United States) D Krawczyk	3	4
WC	(Japan) W Sonobe (Japan) M Uchijima	2	4
(Chinese Taipei) H-c Chan (China) X Jiang	6	6
4	(Hungary) T Babos (Brazil) L Stefani	6	4	[10]
(Slovakia) T Mihalíková (United Kingdom) O Nicholls	3	6	[7]
(Japan) M Kato (Japan) M Ninomiya	3	3
(Canada) G Dabrowski (United States) S Kenin	6	6
(United States) N Melichar-Martinez (China) Y Xu	6	6
(Japan) E Hozumi (Chinese Taipei) F-h Wu	4	4
(Mexico) G Olmos (Indonesia) A Sutjiadi	1	3
3	(Kazakhstan) A Danilina (Serbia) A Krunić	6	6
WC	(Canada) B Andreescu (Canada) V Mboko	6^{4}	6	[10]
Alt	(Colombia) E Arango (Turkey) Z Sönmez	7^{7}	1	[7]
(Japan) S Aoyama (Spain) C Bucșa	6	6
2	(United States) A Muhammad (Netherlands) D Schuurs	2	3

Quarterfinals
1	(Australia) E Perez (United States) T Townsend	6	6
(Chinese Taipei) H-c Chan (China) X Jiang	4	4
4	(Hungary) T Babos (Brazil) L Stefani	7	2	[10]
(Canada) G Dabrowski (United States) S Kenin	5	6	[8]
(United States) N Melichar-Martinez (China) Y Xu	4	4
3	(Kazakhstan) A Danilina (Serbia) A Krunić	6	6
WC	(Canada) B Andreescu (Canada) V Mboko	4	7^{7}	[8]
(Japan) S Aoyama (Spain) C Bucșa	6	6^{3}	[10]

Semifinals
1	(Australia) E Perez (United States) T Townsend	7^{7}	3	[5]
4	(Hungary) T Babos (Brazil) L Stefani	6^{4}	6	[10]
3	(Kazakhstan) A Danilina (Serbia) A Krunić	6	6
(Japan) S Aoyama (Spain) C Bucșa	2	3

Final
4	(Hungary) T Babos (Brazil) L Stefani	6	6
3	(Kazakhstan) A Danilina (Serbia) A Krunić	1	4
