= 2025 Toray Pan Pacific Open =

- Date: 20–26 October
- Edition: 51st
- Category: WTA 500
- Draw: 28S / 16D
- Prize money: $1,064,510
- Surface: Hard / outdoor
- Location: Tokyo, Japan
- Venue: Ariake Coliseum

Champions

Singles
- (Switzerland) Belinda Bencic

Doubles
- (Hungary) Tímea Babos / (Brazil) Luisa Stefani
| ← 2024 · | Pan Pacific Open | · 2026 → |

The 2025 Toray Pan Pacific Open was a professional women's tennis tournament played on outdoor hard courts. It was the 51st edition of the Pan Pacific Open, and part of the WTA 500 tournaments of the 2025 WTA Tour. It took place at the Ariake Coliseum in Tokyo, Japan from 20 to 26 October 2025.

== Champions ==
=== Singles ===
- (Switzerland) Belinda Bencic def. (Czech Republic) Linda Nosková 6–2, 6–3

=== Doubles ===
- (Hungary) Tímea Babos / (Brazil) Luisa Stefani def. (Kazakhstan) Anna Danilina / (Serbia) Aleksandra Krunić 6–1, 6–4

== Singles main draw entrants ==
=== Seeds ===
| Country | Player | Rank | Seeds |
|---|---|---|---|
| ~~ITA~~ | ~~Jasmine Paolini~~ | ~~8~~ | ~~1~~ |
| KAZ | Elena Rybakina | 9 | 2 |
| | Ekaterina Alexandrova | 10 | 3 |
| ~~DEN~~ | ~~Clara Tauson~~ | ~~12~~ | ~~4~~ |
| SUI | Belinda Bencic | 14 | 5 |
| CZE | Linda Nosková | 17 | 6 |
| | Diana Shnaider | 19 | 7 |
| CZE | Karolína Muchová | 20 | 8 |
| CAN | Victoria Mboko | 24 | 9 |
| USA | Sofia Kenin | 26 | 10 |

- Rankings are as of 13 October 2025

=== Other entrants ===
The following players received wildcards into the singles draw:

- (Canada) Bianca Andreescu
- (Czech Republic) Nikola Bartůňková
- (Japan) Wakana Sonobe
- (Japan) Moyuka Uchijima

The following player received entry using a protected ranking:

- (Czech Republic) Markéta Vondroušová

The following players received entry from the qualifying draw:

- (United Kingdom) Katie Boulter
- (Spain) Cristina Bucșa
- Alina Charaeva
- (France) Varvara Gracheva
- (Germany) Eva Lys
- (Greece) Maria Sakkari

The following players received entry as lucky losers:

- (Switzerland) Viktorija Golubic
- (Netherlands) Suzan Lamens

=== Withdrawals ===
- (Australia) Daria Kasatkina → replaced by (Czech Republic) Linda Nosková
- (Belgium) Elise Mertens → replaced by (China) Wang Xinyu
- (United States) Emma Navarro → replaced by (Romania) Jaqueline Cristian
- (Italy) Jasmine Paolini → replaced by (Switzerland) Viktorija Golubic
- (United States) Jessica Pegula → replaced by (Australia) Maya Joint
- (Japan) Naomi Osaka → replaced by (United States) McCartney Kessler
- (Denmark) Clara Tauson → replaced by (Netherlands) Suzan Lamens
- (China) Zheng Qinwen → replaced by Anna Kalinskaya

== Doubles main draw entrants ==
=== Seeds ===
| Country | Player | Country | Player | Rank^{1} | Seed |
|---|---|---|---|---|---|
| AUS | Ellen Perez | USA | Taylor Townsend | 20 | 1 |
| USA | Asia Muhammad | NED | Demi Schuurs | 35 | 2 |
| KAZ | Anna Danilina | SRB | Aleksandra Krunić | 36 | 3 |
| HUN | Tímea Babos | BRA | Luisa Stefani | 38 | 4 |

- Rankings are as of 13 October 2025

=== Other entrants ===
The following pairs received wildcards into the doubles main draw:

- (Canada) Bianca Andreescu / (Canada) Victoria Mboko
- (Japan) Wakana Sonobe / (Japan) Moyuka Uchijima

The following pair received entry as alternates:

- (Colombia) Emiliana Arango / (Turkey) Zeynep Sönmez

=== Withdrawals ===
- (Czech Republic) Linda Nosková / (Slovakia) Rebecca Šramková → replaced by (Colombia) Emiliana Arango / (Turkey) Zeynep Sönmez
