= 2026 Porsche Tennis Grand Prix =

Women's tennis tournament

- Date: 13–19 April
- Edition: 48th
- Category: WTA 500
- Draw: 28S / 16D
- Prize money: €1,049,083
- Surface: Clay (indoor)
- Location: Stuttgart, Germany
- Venue: Porsche-Arena

Champions

Singles
- (Kazakhstan) Elena Rybakina

Doubles
- (United States) Nicole Melichar-Martinez / Liudmila Samsonova
- Porsche Tennis Grand Prix

The 2026 Porsche Tennis Grand Prix was a women's professional tennis tournament played on indoor clay courts at the Porsche Arena in Stuttgart, Germany, from 13 April until 19 April 2026. It was the 48th edition of the Porsche Tennis Grand Prix and a WTA 500 tournament on the 2026 WTA Tour.

== Champions ==
=== Singles ===
- (Kazakhstan) Elena Rybakina def. (Czech Republic) Karolína Muchová, 7–5, 6–1

=== Doubles ===
- (United States) Nicole Melichar-Martinez / Liudmila Samsonova def. (Latvia) Jeļena Ostapenko / (China) Zhang Shuai, 6–1, 6–1

== Point distribution ==
Event	W	F	SF	QF	R16	R32	Q	Q2	Q1
Singles	500	325	195	108	60	1	25	13	1
Doubles	500	325	195	108	1	—N/a	—N/a	—N/a	—N/a

== Singles main draw entrants ==
=== Seeds ===
Country	Player	Rank	Seed
KAZ	Elena Rybakina	2	1
USA	Coco Gauff	3	2
POL	Iga Świątek	4	3
UKR	Elina Svitolina	7	4
ITA	Jasmine Paolini	8	5
	Mirra Andreeva	10	6
CZE	Karolína Muchová	12	7
	Ekaterina Alexandrova	13	8

- Rankings are as of 6 April 2026.

=== Other entrants ===
The following players received wildcards into the main draw:

- (Spain) Paula Badosa
- (Germany) Tamara Korpatsch
- (Germany) Noma Noha Akugue
- (Germany) Ella Seidel

The following players received entry from the qualifying draw:

- (Czech Republic) Gabriela Knutson
- (United States) Alycia Parks
- Aliaksandra Sasnovich
- (Turkey) Zeynep Sönmez

The following player received entry as a lucky loser:

- (Bulgaria) Viktoriya Tomova

=== Withdrawals ===
- Anna Kalinskaya → replaced by (Croatia) Antonia Ružić
- (Czech Republic) Barbora Krejčiková → replaced by (China) Zhang Shuai
- Aryna Sabalenka → replaced by (Bulgaria) Viktoriya Tomova
- (Denmark) Clara Tauson → replaced by (Germany) Laura Siegemund
- (China) Zheng Qinwen → replaced by (Philippines) Alexandra Eala

== Doubles main draw entrants ==
Country	Player	Country	Player	Rank	Seed
LAT	Jeļena Ostapenko	CHN	Zhang Shuai	26	1
AUS	Ellen Perez	NED	Demi Schuurs	42	2
UKR	Lyudmyla Kichenok	USA	Desirae Krawczyk	51	3
USA	Nicole Melichar-Martinez		Liudmila Samsonova	54	4

- Rankings as of 6 April 2026.

=== Other entrants ===
The following pair received a wildcard into the doubles main draw:

- (Germany) Noma Noha Akugue / (Germany) Ella Seidel
