= 2024 Toray Pan Pacific Open – Doubles =

Doubles
- 2024 Toray Pan Pacific Open

Final
- Champions: (Japan) Shuko Aoyama (Japan) Eri Hozumi
- Runners-up: (Japan) Ena Shibahara (Germany) Laura Siegemund
- Score: 6–4, 7–6^{(7–3)}

Details
- Draw: 16
- Seeds: 4

Events
Singles	Doubles
← 2023 ·	Pan Pacific Open	· 2025 →

Shuko Aoyama and Eri Hozumi defeated Ena Shibahara and Laura Siegemund in the final, 6–4, 7–6^{(7–3)} to win the doubles tennis title at the 2024 Pan Pacific Open.

Ulrikke Eikeri and Ingrid Neel were the reigning champions, but Neel did not participate this year and Eikeri chose to compete in Guangzhou instead.

== Seeds ==
1. (Canada) Gabriela Dabrowski / (New Zealand) Erin Routliffe (semifinals)
2. (United States) Asia Muhammad / (Netherlands) Demi Schuurs (quarterfinals)
3. (United States) Sofia Kenin / (United States) Bethanie Mattek-Sands (semifinals, retired)
4. (Spain) Cristina Bucșa / (Romania) Monica Niculescu (quarterfinals)

== Draw ==
=== Key ===
- Q = Qualifier
- WC = Wild card
- LL = Lucky loser
- Alt = Alternate
- ITF = ITF entry
- PR = Protected ranking
- SR = Special ranking
- SE = Special exempt
- JE = Junior exempt
- JR = Junior Accelerator Programme entrant
- CO = College Accelerator Programme entrant
- NG = Next Gen Accelerator Program entrant
- w/o = Walkover
- r = Retired
- d = Defaulted

=== Draw ===
First round
1	(Canada) G Dabrowski (New Zealand) E Routliffe	6	6
(Japan) N Hibino (Japan) M Kato	3	3
WC	(Japan) A Shimizu (Japan) E Shimizu	5	6	[3]
(Thailand) P Plipuech (Chinese Taipei) C-y Tsao	7	2	[10]
4	(Spain) C Bucșa (Romania) M Niculescu	4	6	[10]
(Slovakia) T Mihalíková (United Kingdom) O Nicholls	6	4	[8]
(Japan) S Aoyama (Japan) E Hozumi	4	7^{7}	[10]
(Mexico) G Olmos; A Panova	6	6^{4}	[4]
(China) X Jiang (Chinese Taipei) F-h Wu	2	7^{8}	[4]
(United States) N Melichar-Martinez; D Shnaider	6	6^{6}	[10]
(China) Xin Wang (China) S Zheng	5	2
3	(United States) S Kenin (United States) B Mattek-Sands	7	6
(Italy) E Cocciaretto (Bulgaria) V Tomova	6	3	[4]
(Japan) E Shibahara (Germany) L Siegemund	1	6	[10]
(Japan) M Hontama (Japan) M Uchijima	5	3
2	(United States) A Muhammad (Netherlands) D Schuurs	7	6

Quarterfinals
1	(Canada) G Dabrowski (New Zealand) E Routliffe	6	7^{7}
(Thailand) P Plipuech (Chinese Taipei) C-y Tsao	1	6^{4}
4	(Spain) C Bucșa (Romania) M Niculescu	3	6	[4]
(Japan) S Aoyama (Japan) E Hozumi	6	3	[10]
(United States) N Melichar-Martinez; D Shnaider	6^{7}	6	[8]
3	(United States) S Kenin (United States) B Mattek-Sands	7^{9}	3	[10]
(Japan) E Shibahara (Germany) L Siegemund	6	6
2	(United States) A Muhammad (Netherlands) D Schuurs	4	2

Semifinals
1	(Canada) G Dabrowski (New Zealand) E Routliffe	4	6	[5]
(Japan) S Aoyama (Japan) E Hozumi	6	2	[10]
3	(United States) S Kenin (United States) B Mattek-Sands	2^{r}
(Japan) E Shibahara (Germany) L Siegemund	5

Final
(Japan) S Aoyama (Japan) E Hozumi	6	7^{7}
(Japan) E Shibahara (Germany) L Siegemund	4	6^{3}
