= 2026 Porsche Tennis Grand Prix – Doubles =

Doubles
- 2026 Porsche Tennis Grand Prix

Final
- Champions: (United States) Nicole Melichar-Martinez; Liudmila Samsonova
- Runners-up: (Latvia) Jeļena Ostapenko (China) Zhang Shuai
- Score: 6–1, 6–1

Details
- Draw: 16
- Seeds: 4

Events
Singles	Doubles
- Porsche Tennis Grand Prix

Nicole Melichar-Martinez and Liudmila Samsonova defeated Jeļena Ostapenko and Zhang Shuai in the final, 6–1, 6–1 to win the doubles tennis title at the 2026 Stuttgart Open.

Gabriela Dabrowski and Erin Routliffe were the reigning champions, but did not participate this year.

== Seeds ==
1. (Latvia) Jeļena Ostapenko / (China) Zhang Shuai (final)
2. (Australia) Ellen Perez / (Netherlands) Demi Schuurs (semifinals)
3. (Ukraine) Lyudmyla Kichenok / (United States) Desirae Krawczyk (first round)
4. (United States) Nicole Melichar-Martinez / Liudmila Samsonova (champions)

== Draw ==
Key

- Q = Qualifier
- WC = Wild card
- LL = Lucky loser
- Alt = Alternate
- ITF = ITF entry
- PR = Protected ranking
- SR = Special ranking
- SE = Special exempt
- JE = Junior exempt
- JR = Junior Accelerator Programme entrant
- CO = College Accelerator Programme entrant
- NG = Next Gen Accelerator Program entrant
- w/o = Walkover
- r = Retired
- d = Defaulted

=== Draw ===
First round
1	(Latvia) J Ostapenko (China) S Zhang	7	6
PR	(France) E Lechemia (Belgium) L Salden	5	1
(Germany) L Siegemund; V Zvonareva	6	6
(Spain) A Bolsova (Spain) Y Cavallé Reimers	3	1
3	(Ukraine) L Kichenok (United States) D Krawczyk	2	2
(Norway) U Eikeri (United States) Q Gleason	6	6
(Slovakia) T Mihalíková (Czech Republic) L Nosková	4	3
(United States) A Parks (United States) A Smith	6	6
(Canada) L Fernandez (Hungary) F Stollár	6	6
(China) X Jiang (China) Y Xu	3	2
WC	(Germany) N Noha Akugue (Germany) E Seidel	2	4
4	(United States) N Melichar-Martinez; L Samsonova	6	6
A Panova (China) Z Yang	6	7^{7}
(United Kingdom) M Brooks (United States) I Corley	1	6^{4}
(Japan) E Hozumi (Chinese Taipei) F-h Wu	6	5	[6]
2	(Australia) E Perez (Netherlands) D Schuurs	2	7	[10]

Quarterfinals
1	(Latvia) J Ostapenko (China) S Zhang	6	6
(Germany) L Siegemund; V Zvonareva	4	3
(Norway) U Eikeri (United States) Q Gleason	7^{7}	4	[10]
(United States) A Parks (United States) A Smith	6^{5}	6	[6]
(Canada) L Fernandez (Hungary) F Stollár	4	6	[6]
4	(United States) N Melichar-Martinez; L Samsonova	6	3	[10]
A Panova (China) Z Yang	6^{5}	4
2	(Australia) E Perez (Netherlands) D Schuurs	7^{7}	6

Semifinals
1	(Latvia) J Ostapenko (China) S Zhang	6	7
(Norway) U Eikeri (United States) Q Gleason	3	5
4	(United States) N Melichar-Martinez; L Samsonova	6	4	[10]
2	(Australia) E Perez (Netherlands) D Schuurs	2	6	[5]

Final
1	(Latvia) J Ostapenko (China) S Zhang	1	1
4	(United States) N Melichar-Martinez; L Samsonova	6	6
