= 2026 Porsche Tennis Grand Prix – Singles =

Singles
- 2026 Porsche Tennis Grand Prix

Final
- Champion: (Kazakhstan) Elena Rybakina
- Runner-up: (Czech Republic) Karolína Muchová
- Score: 7–5, 6–1

Details
- Draw: 28 (4 WC / 4 Q)
- Seeds: 8

Events
| Singles | Doubles |
- Porsche Tennis Grand Prix

Elena Rybakina defeated Karolína Muchová in the final, 7–5, 6–1 to win the singles tennis title at the 2026 Stuttgart Open. She saved two match points (in the quarterfinals against Leylah Fernandez) en route to her second title at the event (after 2024) and 13th WTA Tour title overall.

Jeļena Ostapenko was the defending champion, but lost in the first round to Mirra Andreeva.

== Seeds ==
The top four seeds received a bye into the second round.

1. (Kazakhstan) Elena Rybakina (champion)
2. (United States) Coco Gauff (quarterfinals)
3. (Poland) Iga Świątek (quarterfinals)
4. (Ukraine) Elina Svitolina (semifinals)
5. (Italy) Jasmine Paolini (first round)
6. Mirra Andreeva (semifinals)
7. (Czech Republic) Karolína Muchová (final)
8. Ekaterina Alexandrova (second round)

== Draw ==
Key

- Q = Qualifier
- WC = Wild card
- LL = Lucky loser
- Alt = Alternate
- ITF = ITF entry
- PR = Protected ranking
- SR = Special ranking
- SE = Special exempt
- JE = Junior exempt
- JR = Junior Accelerator Programme entrant
- CO = College Accelerator Programme entrant
- NG = Next Gen Accelerator Program entrant
- w/o = Walkover
- r = Retired
- d = Defaulted

=== Finals ===
Semifinals
1 | (Kazakhstan) Elena Rybakina | 7 | 6
6 | Mirra Andreeva | 5 | 1
4 | (Ukraine) Elina Svitolina | 4 | 6 | 4
7 | (Czech Republic) Karolína Muchová | 6 | 2 | 6

Final
1 | (Kazakhstan) Elena Rybakina | 7 | 6
7 | (Czech Republic) Karolína Muchová | 5 | 1

=== Top half ===
First round
WC | (Germany) T Korpatsch | 3 | 1
D Shnaider | 6 | 6
(Philippines) A Eala | 1 | 4
(Canada) L Fernandez | 6 | 6
Q | (Turkey) Z Sönmez | 6 | 6
5 | (Italy) J Paolini | 2 | 2
(Germany) L Siegemund | 4 | 7^{7} | 6
LL | (Bulgaria) V Tomova | 6 | 6^{4} | 1
Q | (United States) A Parks | 6 | 6
WC | (Germany) N Noha Akugue | 4 | 2
(Latvia) J Ostapenko | 7 | 2 | 4
6 | M Andreeva | 5 | 6 | 6

Second round
1 | (Kazakhstan) E Rybakina | 6 | 6
D Shnaider | 3 | 4
(Canada) L Fernandez | 6^{2} | 6 | 7^{7}
Q | (Turkey) Z Sönmez | 7^{7} | 1 | 6^{5}
3 | (Poland) I Świątek | 6 | 6
(Germany) L Siegemund | 2 | 3
Q | (United States) A Parks | 6^{3} | 3
6 | M Andreeva | 7^{7} | 6

Quarterfinals
1 | (Kazakhstan) E Rybakina | 6^{5} | 6 | 7^{8}
(Canada) L Fernandez | 7^{7} | 4 | 6^{6}
3 | (Poland) I Świątek | 6 | 4 | 3
6 | M Andreeva | 3 | 6 | 6

Semifinals
1 | (Kazakhstan) E Rybakina | 7 | 6
6 | M Andreeva | 5 | 1

=== Bottom half ===
First round
8 | E Alexandrova | 6 | 6
Q | (Czech Republic) G Knutson | 2 | 2
(China) S Zhang | 7 | 1 | 4
(Czech Republic) L Nosková | 5 | 6 | 6
(Germany) E Lys | 2 | 7 | 6
WC | (Spain) P Badosa | 6 | 5 | 4
7 | (Czech Republic) K Muchová | 6 | 6
Q | A Sasnovich | 2 | 4
(Belgium) E Mertens | 6 | 6
WC | (Germany) E Seidel | 3 | 4
(Croatia) A Ružić | 0 | 4
L Samsonova | 6 | 6

Second round
8 | E Alexandrova | 1 | 1
(Czech Republic) L Nosková | 6 | 6
(Germany) E Lys | 1 | 0
4 | (Ukraine) E Svitolina | 6 | 6
7 | (Czech Republic) K Muchová | 1 | 6 | 6
(Belgium) E Mertens | 6 | 3 | 0
L Samsonova | 5 | 1
2 | (United States) C Gauff | 7 | 6

Quarterfinals
(Czech Republic) L Nosková | 6^{2} | 5
4 | (Ukraine) E Svitolina | 7^{7} | 7
7 | (Czech Republic) K Muchová | 6 | 5 | 6
2 | (United States) C Gauff | 3 | 7 | 3

Semifinals
4 | (Ukraine) E Svitolina | 4 | 6 | 4
7 | (Czech Republic) K Muchová | 6 | 2 | 6

== Qualifying ==
=== Seeds ===
1. (Turkey) Zeynep Sönmez (qualified)
2. (United States) Alycia Parks (qualified)
3. (Andorra) Victoria Jiménez Kasintseva (first round)
4. Aliaksandra Sasnovich (qualified)
5. (Bulgaria) Viktoriya Tomova (qualifying competition, lucky loser)
6. (France) Carole Monnet (first round)
7. (Germany) Anna-Lena Friedsam (qualifying competition)
8. (Liechtenstein) Kathinka von Deichmann (first round)

=== Qualifiers ===
1. (Turkey) Zeynep Sönmez
2. (United States) Alycia Parks
3. (Czech Republic) Gabriela Knutson
4. Aliaksandra Sasnovich

=== Lucky loser ===
1. (Bulgaria) Viktoriya Tomova

=== Qualifying draw ===
==== First qualifier ====
First round
1 | (Turkey) Zeynep Sönmez | 6 | 6
WC | (Germany) Victoria Pohle | 3 | 4
(Germany) Jule Niemeier | 5 | 1
7 | (Germany) Anna-Lena Friedsam | 7 | 6

Qualifying competition
1 | (Turkey) Zeynep Sönmez | 6 | 6
7 | (Germany) Anna-Lena Friedsam | 4 | 0

==== Second qualifier ====
First round
2 | (United States) Alycia Parks | 7^{7} | 6
(Germany) Eva Bennemann | 6^{1} | 3
(France) Amandine Hesse | 1 | 4
5 | (Bulgaria) Viktoriya Tomova | 6 | 6

Qualifying competition
2 | (United States) Alycia Parks | 6 | 6
5 | (Bulgaria) Viktoriya Tomova | 4 | 2

==== Third qualifier ====
First round
3 | (Andorra) Victoria Jiménez Kasintseva | 3 | 3
Vera Zvonareva | 6 | 6
(Czech Republic) Gabriela Knutson | 6 | 3 | 7^{8}
6 | (France) Carole Monnet | 1 | 6 | 6^{6}

Qualifying competition
Vera Zvonareva | 3 | 3
(Czech Republic) Gabriela Knutson | 6 | 6

==== Fourth qualifier ====
First round
4 | Aliaksandra Sasnovich | 6 | 6
WC | (Germany) Julia Stusek | 1 | 4
PR | (France) Océane Dodin | 6^{2} | 6 | 6
8 | (Liechtenstein) Kathinka von Deichmann | 7^{7} | 4 | 3

Qualifying competition
4 | Aliaksandra Sasnovich | 6 | 6
PR | (France) Océane Dodin | 1 | 1
