= 2024 Toray Pan Pacific Open =

- Date: 21–27 October
- Edition: 50th
- Category: WTA 500
- Draw: 28S / 16D
- Surface: Hard / outdoor
- Location: Tokyo, Japan
- Venue: Ariake Coliseum

Champions

Singles
- (China) Zheng Qinwen

Doubles
- (Japan) Shuko Aoyama / (Japan) Eri Hozumi
- Pan Pacific Open

The 2024 Toray Pan Pacific Open is a professional women's tennis tournament played on outdoor hard courts. It was the 50th edition of the Pan Pacific Open, and part of the WTA 500 tournaments of the 2024 WTA Tour. It took place at the Ariake Coliseum in Tokyo, Japan from 21 to 27 October 2024. First-seeded Zheng Qinwen won the singles title.

== Finals ==
=== Singles ===
- (China) Zheng Qinwen defeated (United States) Sofia Kenin 7–6^{(7–5)}, 6–3

=== Doubles ===
- (Japan) Shuko Aoyama / (Japan) Eri Hozumi defeated (Japan) Ena Shibahara / (Germany) Laura Siegemund 6–4, 7–6^{(7–3)}

== Point distribution ==
Event	W	F	SF	QF	Round of 16	Round of 32	Q	Q2	Q1
Singles	500	325	195	108	60	1	25	13	1
Doubles	500	325	195	108	1	—N/a	—N/a	—N/a	—N/a

== Singles main draw entrants ==
=== Seeds ===
Country	Player	Rank	Seeds
CHN	Zheng Qinwen	7	1
BRA	Beatriz Haddad Maia	10	2
	Daria Kasatkina	11	3
	~~Anna Kalinskaya~~	~~12~~	~~4~~
~~ESP~~	~~Paula Badosa~~	~~15~~	~~5~~
	Diana Shnaider	16	6
POL	Magdalena Fręch	24	7
CAN	Leylah Fernandez	34	8
GBR	Katie Boulter	35	9
CHN	Wang Xinyu	39	10

- Rankings are as of 14 October 2024

=== Other entrants ===
The following players received wildcards into the singles draw:

- (Canada) Bianca Andreescu
- (Japan) Nao Hibino
- (United States) Sofia Kenin
- (United Kingdom) Mika Stojsavljevic

The following player received entry using a protected ranking:

- ~~(Australia) Ajla Tomljanović~~

The following players received entry from the singles qualifying draw:

- (United States) Hailey Baptiste
- (Australia) Priscilla Hon
- (Japan) Mai Hontama
- (Japan) Sayaka Ishii
- (Turkey) Zeynep Sönmez
- (Japan) Mei Yamaguchi

The following player received entry as lucky losers:

- (Japan) Kyōka Okamura
- (Japan) Sara Saito
- Aliaksandra Sasnovich
- (Denmark) Clara Tauson

=== Withdrawals ===
- Mirra Andreeva → replaced by (Italy) Elisabetta Cocciaretto
- (Spain) Paula Badosa → replaced by (Japan) Sara Saito
- (United States) Danielle Collins → replaced by (Poland) Magdalena Fręch
- Anna Kalinskaya → replaced by (Japan) Kyōka Okamura
- (Ukraine) Marta Kostyuk → replaced by (United Kingdom) Katie Boulter
- (Czech Republic) Barbora Krejčiková → replaced by Veronika Kudermetova
- (Belgium) Elise Mertens → replaced by (Denmark) Clara Tauson
- (United States) Emma Navarro → replaced by (Japan) Moyuka Uchijima
- (United States) Jessica Pegula → replaced by (China) Wang Xinyu
- Liudmila Samsonova → replaced by (Bulgaria) Viktoriya Tomova
- (Greece) Maria Sakkari → replaced by (France) Varvara Gracheva
- (Australia) Ajla Tomljanović → replaced by Aliaksandra Sasnovich
- (Croatia) Donna Vekić → replaced by (United States) McCartney Kessler

== Doubles main draw entrants ==
=== Seeds ===
Country	Player	Country	Player	Rank^{1}	Seed
CAN	Gabriela Dabrowski	NZL	Erin Routliffe	7	1
USA	Asia Muhammad	NED	Demi Schuurs	42	2
USA	Sofia Kenin	USA	Bethanie Mattek-Sands	48	3
ESP	Cristina Bucșa	ROU	Monica Niculescu	58	4

- Rankings are as of 14 October 2024

=== Other entrants ===
The following pair received a wildcard into the doubles main draw:

- (Japan) Ayano Shimizu / (Japan) Eri Shimizu
