= 2025 Toray Pan Pacific Open – Singles =

Singles
- 2025 Toray Pan Pacific Open

Final
- Champion: (Switzerland) Belinda Bencic
- Runner-up: (Czech Republic) Linda Nosková
- Score: 6–2, 6–3

Details
- Draw: 28 (6 Q / 4 WC)
- Seeds: 8

Events
Singles	Doubles
- Pan Pacific Open

Belinda Bencic defeated Linda Nosková in the final, 6–2, 6–3 to win the singles tennis title at the 2025 Pan Pacific Open. It was her 10th WTA Tour title, and she saved a match point en route, in the quarterfinals against Karolína Muchová.

Zheng Qinwen was the reigning champion, but withdrew before the tournament began due to an elbow injury.

== Seeds ==
The top four seeds received a bye into the second round.

1. (Italy) Jasmine Paolini (withdrew)
2. (Kazakhstan) Elena Rybakina (semifinals, withdrew)
3. Ekaterina Alexandrova (quarterfinals)
4. (Denmark) Clara Tauson (withdrew)
5. (Switzerland) Belinda Bencic (champion)
6. (Czech Republic) Linda Nosková (final)
7. Diana Shnaider (second round)
8. (Czech Republic) Karolína Muchová (quarterfinals)
9. (Canada) Victoria Mboko (quarterfinals)
10. (United States) Sofia Kenin (semifinals)

== Draw ==
Key

- Q = Qualifier
- WC = Wild card
- LL = Lucky loser
- Alt = Alternate
- ITF = ITF entry
- PR = Protected ranking
- SR = Special ranking
- SE = Special exempt
- JE = Junior exempt
- JR = Junior Accelerator Programme entrant
- CO = College Accelerator Programme entrant
- NG = Next Gen Accelerator Program entrant
- w/o = Walkover
- r = Retired
- d = Defaulted

=== Finals ===
Semifinals
5	(Switzerland) Belinda Bencic	7^{7}	3	6
10	(United States) Sofia Kenin	6^{5}	6	2
6	(Czech Republic) Linda Nosková	w/o
2	(Kazakhstan) Elena Rybakina

Final
5	(Switzerland) Belinda Bencic	6	6
6	(Czech Republic) Linda Nosková	2	3

=== Top half ===
First round
(China) Xin Wang	6	3	4
Q	(France) V Gracheva	4	6	6
LL	(Switzerland) V Golubic	6	6^{5}	2
(Australia) M Joint	1	7^{7}	6
PR	(Czech Republic) M Vondroušová	2	0^{r}
8	(Czech Republic) K Muchová	6	1
Q	A Charaeva	2	3
(Romania) J Cristian	6	6
WC	(Japan) W Sonobe	6	6
WC	(Czech Republic) N Bartůňková	4	3
WC	(Japan) M Uchijima	1	3
10	(United States) S Kenin	6	6

Second round
5	(Switzerland) B Bencic	6	6
Q	(France) V Gracheva	4	3
(Australia) M Joint	3	5
8	(Czech Republic) K Muchová	6	7
3	E Alexandrova	6	6
(Romania) J Cristian	1	2
WC	(Japan) W Sonobe	6	1	6^{2}
10	(United States) S Kenin	3	6	7^{7}

Quarterfinals
5	(Switzerland) B Bencic	3	7	7
8	(Czech Republic) K Muchová	6	5	5
3	E Alexandrova	0	6	6^{3}
10	(United States) S Kenin	6	2	7^{7}

Semifinals
5	(Switzerland) B Bencic	7^{7}	3	6
10	(United States) S Kenin	6^{5}	6	2

=== Bottom half ===
First round
7	D Shnaider	6	6
(Ukraine) D Yastremska	3	1
LL	(Netherlands) S Lamens	3	1
A Kalinskaya	6	6
Q	(Spain) C Bucșa	6	5	3
(United States) M Kessler	3	7	6
9	(Canada) V Mboko	6	6
WC	(Canada) B Andreescu	3	3
Q	(United Kingdom) K Boulter	2	1
Q	(Germany) E Lys	6	6
(Canada) L Fernandez	7^{7}	6
Q	(Greece) M Sakkari	6^{5}	4

Second round
7	D Shnaider	6^{4}	6	6^{5}
A Kalinskaya	7^{7}	2	7^{7}
(United States) M Kessler	7	3	4
6	(Czech Republic) L Nosková	5	6	6
9	(Canada) V Mboko	6	6
Q	(Germany) E Lys	1	1
(Canada) L Fernandez	4	3
2	(Kazakhstan) E Rybakina	6	6

Quarterfinals
A Kalinskaya	0	0^{r}
6	(Czech Republic) L Nosková	6	1
9	(Canada) V Mboko	3	6^{4}
2	(Kazakhstan) E Rybakina	6	7^{7}

Semifinals
6	(Czech Republic) L Nosková	w/o
2	(Kazakhstan) E Rybakina

== Qualifying ==
=== Seeds ===
1. (Czech Republic) Marie Bouzková (first round)
2. (Germany) Eva Lys (qualified)
3. (Colombia) Emiliana Arango (first round)
4. (United States) Ashlyn Krueger (first round)
5. (Serbia) Olga Danilović (withdrew)
6. (Greece) Maria Sakkari (qualified)
7. (Netherlands) Suzan Lamens (qualifying competition, lucky loser)
8. (United Kingdom) Katie Boulter (qualified)
9. (Switzerland) Viktorija Golubic (qualifying competition, lucky loser)
10. (United States) Hailey Baptiste (first round, retired)
11. (Slovakia) Rebecca Šramková (qualifying competition, retired)
12. (Spain) Cristina Bucșa (qualified)

=== Qualifiers ===
1. (United Kingdom) Katie Boulter
2. (Germany) Eva Lys
3. (France) Varvara Gracheva
4. (Spain) Cristina Bucșa
5. Alina Charaeva
6. (Greece) Maria Sakkari

=== Lucky losers ===
1. (Switzerland) Viktorija Golubic
2. (Netherlands) Suzan Lamens

=== Qualifying draw ===
==== First qualifier ====
First round
1	(Czech Republic) Marie Bouzková	6	6^{3}	2
(Australia) Kimberly Birrell	2	7^{7}	6
Anna Blinkova	1	6	2
8	(United Kingdom) Katie Boulter	6	0	6

Qualifying competition
(Australia) Kimberly Birrell	6	3	6^{2}
8	(United Kingdom) Katie Boulter	3	6	7^{7}

==== Second qualifier ====
First round
2	(Germany) Eva Lys	6	6
(Ukraine) Yuliia Starodubtseva	3	2
WC	(Japan) Sae Noguchi	2	1
9	(Switzerland) Viktorija Golubic	6	6

Qualifying competition
2	(Germany) Eva Lys	6	7^{7}
9	(Switzerland) Viktorija Golubic	3	6^{4}

==== Third qualifier ====
First round
3	(Colombia) Emiliana Arango	2	6	5
(France) Varvara Gracheva	6	2	7
Alt	(Australia) Maddison Inglis	2	6	1
10	(United States) Hailey Baptiste	6	4	0^{r}

Qualifying competition
(France) Varvara Gracheva	6	6
Alt	(Australia) Maddison Inglis	3	1

==== Fourth qualifier ====
First round
4	(United States) Ashlyn Krueger	4	2
(Hungary) Dalma Gálfi	6	6
WC	(Japan) Nao Hibino	3	1
12	(Spain) Cristina Bucșa	6	6

Qualifying competition
(Hungary) Dalma Gálfi	3	6^{4}
12	(Spain) Cristina Bucșa	6	7^{7}

==== Fifth qualifier ====
First round
Alt	Alina Charaeva	6	1	6
WC	(Japan) Himeno Sakatsume	4	6	2
WC	(Japan) Ena Shibahara	4	6	5
11	(Slovakia) Rebecca Šramková	6	4	7

Qualifying competition
Alt	Alina Charaeva	6	3
11	(Slovakia) Rebecca Šramková	1	0^{r}

==== Sixth qualifier ====
First round
6	(Greece) Maria Sakkari	7	6
(Turkey) Zeynep Sönmez	5	3
Aliaksandra Sasnovich	4	6	4
7	(Netherlands) Suzan Lamens	6	0	6

Qualifying competition
6	(Greece) Maria Sakkari	6	6
7	(Netherlands) Suzan Lamens	3	3
