= 2025 ITF Women's World Tennis Tour (October–December) =

The 2025 ITF Women's World Tennis Tour is the 2025 edition of the second-tier tour for women's professional tennis. It is organised by the International Tennis Federation and is a tier below the WTA Tour. The ITF Women's World Tennis Tour includes tournaments in five categories with prize money ranging from $15,000 up to $100,000.

== Key ==
Category
W100 tournaments ($100,000)
W75 tournaments ($60,000)
W50 tournaments ($40,000)
W35 tournaments ($30,000)
W15 tournaments ($15,000)

=== October ===
Week of	Tournament	Winner	Runners-up	Semifinalists	Quarterfinalists
October 6	Edmond Open; Edmond, United States; Hard; W100; Singles – Doubles	(United States) Elizabeth Mandlik; 6–3, 7–5	(Canada) Marina Stakusic	Iryna Shymanovich (Canada) Cadence Brace	(Mexico) Renata Zarazúa (United States) Madison Brengle (Canada) Katherine Sebov (Australia) Olivia Gadecki
October 6	Edmond Open; Edmond, United States; Hard; W100; Singles – Doubles	(Ukraine) Valeriya Strakhova; Anastasia Tikhonova; 6–3, 6–7^{(2–7)}, [10–8]	(Australia) Olivia Gadecki (Poland) Olivia Lincer	Iryna Shymanovich (Canada) Cadence Brace	(Mexico) Renata Zarazúa (United States) Madison Brengle (Canada) Katherine Sebov (Australia) Olivia Gadecki
October 6	Heraklion, Greece; Clay; W50; Singles and doubles draws	(Czech Republic) Laura Samson; 5–7, 6–2, 6–1	(France) Séléna Janicijevic	(Italy) Lisa Pigato (Cyprus) Raluca Șerban	(Greece) Marianne Argyrokastriti (Germany) Eva Marie Voracek (Italy) Laura Mair (Bulgaria) Denislava Glushkova
October 6	Heraklion, Greece; Clay; W50; Singles and doubles draws	(Greece) Martha Matoula; Ksenia Zaytseva; 7–6^{(7–5)}, 6–0	Elina Nepliy (United States) Hibah Shaikh	(Italy) Lisa Pigato (Cyprus) Raluca Șerban	(Greece) Marianne Argyrokastriti (Germany) Eva Marie Voracek (Italy) Laura Mair (Bulgaria) Denislava Glushkova
October 6	Darwin, Australia; Hard; W35; Singles and doubles draws	(South Korea) Jeong Bo-young; 6–2, 7–5	(Australia) Elena Micic	(Japan) Reina Goto (Australia) Taylah Preston	(South Korea) Jang Su-jeong (United Kingdom) Brooke Black (Australia) Jizelle Sibai (Japan) Shiho Akita
October 6	Darwin, Australia; Hard; W35; Singles and doubles draws	(United Kingdom) Brooke Black (Japan) Reina Goto; 6–3, 6–2	(Australia) Elicia Kim (Australia) Jizelle Sibai	(Japan) Reina Goto (Australia) Taylah Preston	(South Korea) Jang Su-jeong (United Kingdom) Brooke Black (Australia) Jizelle Sibai (Japan) Shiho Akita
October 6	Kunshan, China; Hard; W35; Singles and doubles draws	(United States) Carol Young Suh Lee; 6–4, 7–5	(China) You Xiaodi	(China) Liu Fangzhou (South Korea) Back Da-yeon	Tatiana Prozorova; Daria Khomutsianskaya; Ekaterina Reyngold (Japan) Haruka Kaji
October 6	Kunshan, China; Hard; W35; Singles and doubles draws	(China) Li Zongyu (China) Zheng Wushuang; 6–2, 6–2	(India) Rutuja Bhosale (India) Ankita Raina	(China) Liu Fangzhou (South Korea) Back Da-yeon	Tatiana Prozorova; Daria Khomutsianskaya; Ekaterina Reyngold (Japan) Haruka Kaji
October 6	Seville, Spain; Clay; W35; Singles and doubles draws	(Spain) Ane Mintegi del Olmo; 6–2, 6–1	(Spain) Lucía Cortez Llorca	(Spain) Sara Dols (Italy) Federica Urgesi	(Bulgaria) Gergana Topalova (France) Alizé Lim (Spain) Neus Torner Sensano (Italy) Anastasia Abbagnato
October 6	Seville, Spain; Clay; W35; Singles and doubles draws	(Italy) Anastasia Abbagnato (Italy) Federica Urgesi; 6–4, 6–4	(Spain) María Martínez Vaquero (Spain) Alba Rey García	(Spain) Sara Dols (Italy) Federica Urgesi	(Bulgaria) Gergana Topalova (France) Alizé Lim (Spain) Neus Torner Sensano (Italy) Anastasia Abbagnato
October 6	Santa Margherita di Pula, Italy; Clay; W35; Singles and doubles draws	(Czech Republic) Julie Paštiková; 6–2, 4–6, 6–2	(Croatia) Tena Lukas	(Germany) Katharina Hobgarski (Sweden) Lisa Zaar	(France) Emma Léné (Czech Republic) Julie Štruplová (Italy) Federica Bilardo (Italy) Nicole Fossa Huergo
October 6	Santa Margherita di Pula, Italy; Clay; W35; Singles and doubles draws	(Germany) Katharina Hobgarski (Sweden) Lisa Zaar; 6–3, 6–4	(Morocco) Yasmine Kabbaj (France) Mathilde Lollia	(Germany) Katharina Hobgarski (Sweden) Lisa Zaar	(France) Emma Léné (Czech Republic) Julie Štruplová (Italy) Federica Bilardo (Italy) Nicole Fossa Huergo
October 6	Redding, United States; Hard; W35; Singles and doubles draws	(Italy) Francesca Pace; 1–6, 6–2, 6–4	(United States) Lea Ma	(India) Krisha Mahendran (United States) Akasha Urhobo	(United States) Madison Sieg (United States) Jaeda Daniel (United States) Vivian Wolff (Serbia) Katarina Jokić
October 6	Redding, United States; Hard; W35; Singles and doubles draws	(Australia) Elysia Bolton (United States) Jaeda Daniel; 7–5, 7–5	(United States) Kolie Allen (United States) Rasheeda McAdoo	(India) Krisha Mahendran (United States) Akasha Urhobo	(United States) Madison Sieg (United States) Jaeda Daniel (United States) Vivian Wolff (Serbia) Katarina Jokić
October 6	Sharm El Sheikh, Egypt; Hard; W15; Singles and doubles draws	Kristina Kroitor; 6–2, 7–6^{(7–3)}	(Czech Republic) Jana Kovačková	(Georgia (country)) Zoziya Kardava (Egypt) Lamis Alhussein Abdel Aziz	(United States) Carolyn Ansari; Anna Snigireva (Latvia) Kamilla Bartone (Czech Republic) Alena Kovačková
October 6	Sharm El Sheikh, Egypt; Hard; W15; Singles and doubles draws	(Egypt) Aya El Sayed (Egypt) Nada Fouad; 6–1, 6–4	(Latvia) Kamilla Bartone (Uzbekistan) Sevil Yuldasheva	(Georgia (country)) Zoziya Kardava (Egypt) Lamis Alhussein Abdel Aziz	(United States) Carolyn Ansari; Anna Snigireva (Latvia) Kamilla Bartone (Czech Republic) Alena Kovačková
October 6	Monastir, Tunisia; Hard; W15; Singles and doubles draws	(France) Manon Léonard; 6–4, 6–3	(Poland) Amelia Paszun	(Denmark) Rebecca Munk Mortensen (Spain) Claudia Ferrer Pérez	(France) Eleejah Inisan (United States) Victoria Mulville (Japan) Kayo Nishimura (Spain) Ruth Roura Llaverias
October 6	Monastir, Tunisia; Hard; W15; Singles and doubles draws	Maria Golovina (Poland) Monika Stankiewicz; 6–4, 3–6, [10–7]	(Morocco) Diae El Jardi (United Kingdom) Lauryn John-Baptiste	(Denmark) Rebecca Munk Mortensen (Spain) Claudia Ferrer Pérez	(France) Eleejah Inisan (United States) Victoria Mulville (Japan) Kayo Nishimura (Spain) Ruth Roura Llaverias
October 6	Santa Tecla, El Salvador; Hard; W15; Singles and doubles draws	(France) Sophia Biolay; 7–6^{(7–4)}, 6–3	(Ecuador) Mell Reasco González	(United States) Dasha Ivanova (Netherlands) Merel Hoedt	(Mexico) Jéssica Hinojosa Gómez (Colombia) María Torres Murcia (Brazil) Carolina Bohrer Martins (Mexico) María Fernanda Navarro Oliva
October 6	Santa Tecla, El Salvador; Hard; W15; Singles and doubles draws	(Mexico) Jéssica Hinojosa Gómez (Mexico) María Fernanda Navarro Oliva; 7–5, 2–6, [10–7]	(Colombia) María Herazo González (Netherlands) Merel Hoedt	(United States) Dasha Ivanova (Netherlands) Merel Hoedt	(Mexico) Jéssica Hinojosa Gómez (Colombia) María Torres Murcia (Brazil) Carolina Bohrer Martins (Mexico) María Fernanda Navarro Oliva
October 6	São João da Boa Vista, Brazil; Clay; W15; Singles and doubles draws	(Brazil) Nauhany Vitória Leme da Silva; 6–4, 6–3	(Chile) Antonia Vergara Rivera	(Argentina) Justina María González Daniele (Chile) Jimar Gerald González	(Argentina) Jazmín Ortenzi (Argentina) Berta Bonardi (Brazil) Luiza Fullana (Brazil) Sofia Mendonça
October 6	São João da Boa Vista, Brazil; Clay; W15; Singles and doubles draws	(Argentina) Jazmín Ortenzi (Colombia) María Paulina Pérez; 6–3, 6–7^{(3–7)}, [10–7]	(Brazil) Júlia Konishi Camargo Silva (Brazil) Rebeca Pereira	(Argentina) Justina María González Daniele (Chile) Jimar Gerald González	(Argentina) Jazmín Ortenzi (Argentina) Berta Bonardi (Brazil) Luiza Fullana (Brazil) Sofia Mendonça
October 13	Torneig Internacional Els Gorchs; Les Franqueses del Vallès, Spain; Hard; W100; Singles – Doubles	(Latvia) Darja Semeņistaja; 7–5, 7–6^{(7–4)}	(Poland) Linda Klimovičová	(Ukraine) Daria Snigur (Serbia) Lola Radivojević	(Switzerland) Susan Bandecchi (Spain) Kaitlin Quevedo (Italy) Lucrezia Stefanini (Netherlands) Arantxa Rus
October 13	Torneig Internacional Els Gorchs; Les Franqueses del Vallès, Spain; Hard; W100; Singles – Doubles	(Slovenia) Dalila Jakupović (Slovenia) Nika Radišić; 6–4, 2–6, [10–6]	(Switzerland) Susan Bandecchi (United Kingdom) Freya Christie	(Ukraine) Daria Snigur (Serbia) Lola Radivojević	(Switzerland) Susan Bandecchi (Spain) Kaitlin Quevedo (Italy) Lucrezia Stefanini (Netherlands) Arantxa Rus
October 13	Tennis Classic of Macon; Macon, United States; Hard; W100; Singles – Doubles	(Mexico) Renata Zarazúa; 6–2, 6–1	(United States) Anna Rogers	(Australia) Emerson Jones (Czech Republic) Darja Vidmanová	(Australia) Olivia Gadecki; Anastasia Gasanova (United States) Ayana Akli; Ekaterina Khayrutdinova
October 13	Tennis Classic of Macon; Macon, United States; Hard; W100; Singles – Doubles	(United States) Ayana Akli (United States) Eryn Cayetano; 6–7^{(4–7)}, 6–2, [16–14]	(United States) Rasheeda McAdoo (Kenya) Angella Okutoyi	(Australia) Emerson Jones (Czech Republic) Darja Vidmanová	(Australia) Olivia Gadecki; Anastasia Gasanova (United States) Ayana Akli; Ekaterina Khayrutdinova
October 13	The Campus Open; Quinta do Lago, Portugal; Hard; W75; Singles – Doubles	Maria Timofeeva; 7–6^{(9–7)}, 7–6^{(7–3)}	(United States) Alexis Blokhina	(Portugal) Francisca Jorge; Kira Pavlova	(Croatia) Jana Fett (Italy) Silvia Ambrosio (Portugal) Matilde Jorge (Italy) Nuria Brancaccio
October 13	The Campus Open; Quinta do Lago, Portugal; Hard; W75; Singles – Doubles	(Portugal) Francisca Jorge (Portugal) Matilde Jorge; 4–6, 7–5, [10–7]	(Czech Republic) Anna Sisková; Maria Timofeeva	(Portugal) Francisca Jorge; Kira Pavlova	(Croatia) Jana Fett (Italy) Silvia Ambrosio (Portugal) Matilde Jorge (Italy) Nuria Brancaccio
October 13	Cherbourg-en-Cotentin, France; Hard (i); W50; Singles and doubles draws	(France) Manon Léonard; 3–6, 6–1, 7–5	(France) Tiphanie Lemaître	Alexandra Shubladze (United Kingdom) Lily Miyazaki	(France) Océane Dodin (France) Amandine Monnot (France) Diana Martynov (Ukraine) Veronika Podrez
October 13	Cherbourg-en-Cotentin, France; Hard (i); W50; Singles and doubles draws	(Spain) Lucía Cortez Llorca (France) Lucie Nguyen Tan; 6–4, 6–2	(France) Manon Léonard (France) Amandine Monnot	Alexandra Shubladze (United Kingdom) Lily Miyazaki	(France) Océane Dodin (France) Amandine Monnot (France) Diana Martynov (Ukraine) Veronika Podrez
October 13	Huzhou, China; Hard; W35; Singles and doubles draws	Daria Khomutsianskaya; 7–5, 6–2	(China) Wang Jiaqi	(United States) Hina Inoue (China) Zhang Ying	(China) Guo Meiqi (Slovakia) Viktória Morvayová; Anna Kubareva (United States) Kristina Penickova
October 13	Huzhou, China; Hard; W35; Singles and doubles draws	(China) Huang Yujia (China) Zhang Ying; 6–2, 6–4	(United States) Kristina Penickova; Rada Zolotareva	(United States) Hina Inoue (China) Zhang Ying	(China) Guo Meiqi (Slovakia) Viktória Morvayová; Anna Kubareva (United States) Kristina Penickova
October 13	Birmingham, United Kingdom; Hard (i); W35; Singles and doubles draws	(United Kingdom) Mika Stojsavljevic; 6–4, 6–0	(Slovakia) Katarína Kužmová	(Netherlands) Anouck Vrancken Peeters (United Kingdom) Amarni Banks	(Germany) Mara Guth (Sweden) Kajsa Rinaldo Persson (United Kingdom) Mimi Xu (United Kingdom) Alicia Dudeney
October 13	Birmingham, United Kingdom; Hard (i); W35; Singles and doubles draws	(Czech Republic) Vendula Valdmannová (United Kingdom) Mimi Xu; 6–3, 7–6^{(7–5)}	(United Kingdom) Alicia Dudeney (Slovakia) Katarína Kužmová	(Netherlands) Anouck Vrancken Peeters (United Kingdom) Amarni Banks	(Germany) Mara Guth (Sweden) Kajsa Rinaldo Persson (United Kingdom) Mimi Xu (United Kingdom) Alicia Dudeney
October 13	Santa Margherita di Pula, Italy; Clay; W35; Singles and doubles draws	(Czech Republic) Julie Štruplová; 2–6, 6–2, 6–4	(Italy) Jennifer Ruggeri	(Italy) Federica Urgesi (Spain) Cristina Díaz Adrover	(Hungary) Amarissa Tóth (Italy) Angelica Raggi (Bulgaria) Rositsa Dencheva (Sweden) Lisa Zaar
October 13	Santa Margherita di Pula, Italy; Clay; W35; Singles and doubles draws	(Serbia) Anja Stanković (Bulgaria) Elizara Yaneva; 7–5, 6–4	(Italy) Eleonora Alvisi (Italy) Gaia Maduzzi	(Italy) Federica Urgesi (Spain) Cristina Díaz Adrover	(Hungary) Amarissa Tóth (Italy) Angelica Raggi (Bulgaria) Rositsa Dencheva (Sweden) Lisa Zaar
October 13	Heraklion, Greece; Clay; W35; Singles and doubles draws	(Serbia) Natalija Senić; 6–3, 6–2	Daria Lodikova	(Bulgaria) Denislava Glushkova; Ksenia Zaytseva	(Netherlands) Antonia Stoyanov (Greece) Martha Matoula (Belgium) Romane Longueville (Italy) Jessica Bertoldo
October 13	Heraklion, Greece; Clay; W35; Singles and doubles draws	(Serbia) Natalija Senić (Netherlands) Antonia Stoyanov; 6–4, 6–2	(Greece) Elena Korokozidi (Greece) Martha Matoula	(Bulgaria) Denislava Glushkova; Ksenia Zaytseva	(Netherlands) Antonia Stoyanov (Greece) Martha Matoula (Belgium) Romane Longueville (Italy) Jessica Bertoldo
October 13	Quebec City, Canada; Hard (i); W35; Singles and doubles draws	(United Kingdom) Victoria Allen; 7–6^{(7–3)}, 6–2	(Netherlands) Jasmijn Gimbrère	(Canada) Raphaëlle Lacasse (United Kingdom) Esther Adeshina	(Slovakia) Irina Balus (Canada) Teah Chavez (Canada) Ariana Arseneault (Switzerland) Jenny Dürst
October 13	Quebec City, Canada; Hard (i); W35; Singles and doubles draws	(Canada) Raphaëlle Lacasse (Canada) Alexandra Vagramov; 6–3, 6–2	(Japan) Haruna Arakawa (Japan) Natsuho Arakawa	(Canada) Raphaëlle Lacasse (United Kingdom) Esther Adeshina	(Slovakia) Irina Balus (Canada) Teah Chavez (Canada) Ariana Arseneault (Switzerland) Jenny Dürst
October 13	Bakersfield, United States; Hard; W35; Singles and doubles draws	(United States) Vivian Wolff; 6–4, 6–1	(Luxembourg) Marie Weckerle	Kristina Liutova (Kazakhstan) Sonja Zhiyenbayeva	(Japan) Mio Mushika (United Kingdom) Ella McDonald (Bosnia and Herzegovina) Ema Burgić (United States) Kate Fakih
October 13	Bakersfield, United States; Hard; W35; Singles and doubles draws	(Bosnia and Herzegovina) Ema Burgić (Ukraine) Anita Sahdiieva; 5–7, 6–1, [10–7]	(Italy) Francesca Pace (Poland) Zuzanna Pawlikowska	Kristina Liutova (Kazakhstan) Sonja Zhiyenbayeva	(Japan) Mio Mushika (United Kingdom) Ella McDonald (Bosnia and Herzegovina) Ema Burgić (United States) Kate Fakih
October 13	Essen, Germany; Hard (i); W15; Singles and doubles draws	(Germany) Eva Bennemann; 1–6, 6–3, 6–1	(Germany) Tessa Brockmann	(Netherlands) Klara Veldman (Germany) Josy Daems	(Ukraine) Anastasia Firman (Germany) Victoria Pohle (Germany) Karla Bartel (Netherlands) Danique Havermans
October 13	Essen, Germany; Hard (i); W15; Singles and doubles draws	(Germany) Laura Böhner (Germany) Tessa Brockmann; 7–5, 6–4	(Germany) Josy Daems (Ukraine) Anastasia Firman	(Netherlands) Klara Veldman (Germany) Josy Daems	(Ukraine) Anastasia Firman (Germany) Victoria Pohle (Germany) Karla Bartel (Netherlands) Danique Havermans
October 13	Sharm El Sheikh, Egypt; Hard; W15; Singles and doubles draws	(Egypt) Lamis Alhussein Abdel Aziz; 6–2, 6–4	Victoria Milovanova	(Egypt) Nada Fouad; Polina Kuharenko	Valeriia Shvetsova (China) Hu Feier (Canada) Ellie Daniels; Kristina Kroitor
October 13	Sharm El Sheikh, Egypt; Hard; W15; Singles and doubles draws	Polina Kuharenko; Victoria Milovanova; 4–6, 6–2, [10–3]	(Egypt) Mariam Atia (Japan) Yuzuha Negishi	(Egypt) Nada Fouad; Polina Kuharenko	Valeriia Shvetsova (China) Hu Feier (Canada) Ellie Daniels; Kristina Kroitor
October 13	Monastir, Tunisia; Hard; W15; Singles and doubles draws	(France) Eleejah Inisan; 6–1, 6–2	(Japan) Kayo Nishimura	(Ukraine) Masha Lazarenko; Maria Golovina	(Poland) Inka Wawrzkiewicz (Italy) Lavinia Luciano (China) Mi Lan (France) Dune Vaissaud
October 13	Monastir, Tunisia; Hard; W15; Singles and doubles draws	(Poland) Amelia Paszun (Poland) Inka Wawrzkiewicz; 6–2, 6–3	(Australia) Amy Stevens (France) Dune Vaissaud	(Ukraine) Masha Lazarenko; Maria Golovina	(Poland) Inka Wawrzkiewicz (Italy) Lavinia Luciano (China) Mi Lan (France) Dune Vaissaud
October 20	Wrexham, United Kingdom; Hard (i); W100; Singles and doubles draws	(United Kingdom) Mimi Xu; 6–3, 7–5	(United Kingdom) Mika Stojsavljevic	(United Kingdom) Lily Miyazaki (Estonia) Elena Malõgina	(Belgium) Jana Otzipka (France) Harmony Tan (Czech Republic) Lucie Havlíčková (United Kingdom) Ella McDonald
October 20	Wrexham, United Kingdom; Hard (i); W100; Singles and doubles draws	(United Kingdom) Ella McDonald (United Kingdom) Mimi Xu; 6–2, 6–4	(United Kingdom) Amarni Banks (Switzerland) Valentina Ryser	(United Kingdom) Lily Miyazaki (Estonia) Elena Malõgina	(Belgium) Jana Otzipka (France) Harmony Tan (Czech Republic) Lucie Havlíčková (United Kingdom) Ella McDonald
October 20	Tyler Pro Challenge; Tyler, United States; Hard; W100; Singles – Doubles	(Croatia) Petra Marčinko; 6–3, 6–0	(United States) Mary Stoiana	(Mexico) Renata Zarazúa (Australia) Olivia Gadecki	Iryna Shymanovich (United States) Eryn Cayetano; Anastasia Gasanova (United States) Kayla Day
October 20	Tyler Pro Challenge; Tyler, United States; Hard; W100; Singles – Doubles	(Poland) Weronika Falkowska (United States) Dalayna Hewitt; 6–2, 6–3	(United States) Eryn Cayetano (United States) Victoria Hu	(Mexico) Renata Zarazúa (Australia) Olivia Gadecki	Iryna Shymanovich (United States) Eryn Cayetano; Anastasia Gasanova (United States) Kayla Day
October 20	Internationaux Féminins de la Vienne; Poitiers, France; Hard (i); W75; Singles – Doubles	(Ukraine) Veronika Podrez; 7–5, 2–6, 6–4	(Portugal) Francisca Jorge	(United States) Clervie Ngounoue (Turkey) Çağla Büyükakçay	(Czech Republic) Anna Sisková (Czech Republic) Vendula Valdmannová (France) Amandine Hesse (France) Diana Martynov
October 20	Internationaux Féminins de la Vienne; Poitiers, France; Hard (i); W75; Singles – Doubles	(Czech Republic) Anna Sisková (Czech Republic) Vendula Valdmannová; 6–1, 6–4	(Poland) Anna Hertel (France) Tiphanie Lemaître	(United States) Clervie Ngounoue (Turkey) Çağla Büyükakçay	(Czech Republic) Anna Sisková (Czech Republic) Vendula Valdmannová (France) Amandine Hesse (France) Diana Martynov
October 20	Hamburg Ladies Cup; Hamburg, Germany; Hard (i); W75; Singles – Doubles	Erika Andreeva; 6–4, 6–2	(Spain) Kaitlin Quevedo	(Netherlands) Anouck Vrancken Peeters (Turkey) Berfu Cengiz	(Croatia) Lea Bošković (Poland) Martyna Kubka (Germany) Tessa Brockmann (Germany) Mona Barthel
October 20	Hamburg Ladies Cup; Hamburg, Germany; Hard (i); W75; Singles – Doubles	(Poland) Martyna Kubka (Greece) Sapfo Sakellaridi; 6–3, 6–2	(Germany) Tessa Brockmann (Germany) Phillippa Preugschat	(Netherlands) Anouck Vrancken Peeters (Turkey) Berfu Cengiz	(Croatia) Lea Bošković (Poland) Martyna Kubka (Germany) Tessa Brockmann (Germany) Mona Barthel
October 20	Challenger de Saguenay; Saguenay, Canada; Hard (i); W75; Singles – Doubles	Anastasia Tikhonova; 6–3, 6–2	(Slovakia) Viktória Hrunčáková	(Japan) Yuno Kitahara (United States) Anna Rogers	(Slovakia) Irina Balus (United States) Ava Markham (Japan) Ayumi Koshiishi (Germany) Carolina Kuhl
October 20	Challenger de Saguenay; Saguenay, Canada; Hard (i); W75; Singles – Doubles	(Canada) Ariana Arseneault (Canada) Raphaëlle Lacasse; 5–7, 6–3, [10–5]	(Netherlands) Jasmijn Gimbrère (United States) Anna Rogers	(Japan) Yuno Kitahara (United States) Anna Rogers	(Slovakia) Irina Balus (United States) Ava Markham (Japan) Ayumi Koshiishi (Germany) Carolina Kuhl
October 20	Ibagué, Colombia; Clay; W50; Singles and doubles draws	(Argentina) Jazmín Ortenzi; 7–5, 2–6, 6–3	(Greece) Despina Papamichail	(Argentina) Carla Markus (Chile) Antonia Vergara Rivera	(Chile) Jimar Gerald González (Colombia) Yuliana Lizarazo (Colombia) Valentina Mediorreal (Ecuador) Mell Reasco González
October 20	Ibagué, Colombia; Clay; W50; Singles and doubles draws	(Chile) Jimar Gerald González (Ecuador) Mell Reasco González; Walkover	(Argentina) Carla Markus (Chile) Antonia Vergara Rivera	(Argentina) Carla Markus (Chile) Antonia Vergara Rivera	(Chile) Jimar Gerald González (Colombia) Yuliana Lizarazo (Colombia) Valentina Mediorreal (Ecuador) Mell Reasco González
October 20	Brisbane QTC Tennis International; Brisbane, Australia; Hard; W35; Singles and doubles draws	(China) Tian Fangran; 2–6, 7–6^{(7–5)}, 6–1	(United Kingdom) Katie Swan	(Chinese Taipei) Yang Ya-yi (Australia) Taylah Preston	(Japan) Reina Goto (Australia) Tahlia Kokkinis (Japan) Natsumi Kawaguchi (United Kingdom) Brooke Black
October 20	Brisbane QTC Tennis International; Brisbane, Australia; Hard; W35; Singles and doubles draws	(Chinese Taipei) Lee Ya-hsuan (Chinese Taipei) Lin Fang-an; 6–7^{(6–8)}, 6–4, [10–8]	(Australia) Tenika McGiffin (Japan) Naho Sato	(Chinese Taipei) Yang Ya-yi (Australia) Taylah Preston	(Japan) Reina Goto (Australia) Tahlia Kokkinis (Japan) Natsumi Kawaguchi (United Kingdom) Brooke Black
October 20	Qiandaohu, China; Hard; W35; Singles and doubles draws	(Ukraine) Katarina Zavatska; 7–5, 3–6, 6–2	Ekaterina Reyngold	(China) Ye Shiyu (Japan) Misaki Matsuda	(China) Shao Yushan (China) Li Zongyu; Darya Astakhova (Japan) Rina Saigo
October 20	Qiandaohu, China; Hard; W35; Singles and doubles draws	(China) Wang Meiling (China) Ye Qiuyu; 6–1, 6–2	(China) Hou Yanan (China) Yuan Chengyiyi	(China) Ye Shiyu (Japan) Misaki Matsuda	(China) Shao Yushan (China) Li Zongyu; Darya Astakhova (Japan) Rina Saigo
October 20	Lagos, Portugal; Hard; W35; Singles and doubles draws	(South Korea) Ku Yeon-woo; 6–2, 4–6, 7–6^{(7–5)}	(United States) Carolyn Ansari	(Italy) Vittoria Paganetti (China) Tian Jialin	(Italy) Camilla Zanolini (Germany) Josy Daems (France) Alice Tubello (United States) Sara Daavettila
October 20	Lagos, Portugal; Hard; W35; Singles and doubles draws	(Italy) Vittoria Paganetti (France) Alice Tubello; 7–5, 3–6, [10–4]	(France) Yasmine Mansouri (Serbia) Elena Milovanović	(Italy) Vittoria Paganetti (China) Tian Jialin	(Italy) Camilla Zanolini (Germany) Josy Daems (France) Alice Tubello (United States) Sara Daavettila
October 20	Santa Margherita di Pula, Italy; Clay; W35; Singles and doubles draws	(Italy) Lisa Pigato; 6–1, 6–4	(Italy) Giorgia Pedone	(Morocco) Yasmine Kabbaj (Italy) Jennifer Ruggeri	(Italy) Gaia Maduzzi (Czech Republic) Julie Štruplová (Sweden) Lisa Zaar (Greece) Martha Matoula
October 20	Santa Margherita di Pula, Italy; Clay; W35; Singles and doubles draws	(Greece) Martha Matoula (Sweden) Lisa Zaar; 6–1, 4–6, [13–11]	(Serbia) Anja Stanković (Switzerland) Katerina Tsygourova	(Morocco) Yasmine Kabbaj (Italy) Jennifer Ruggeri	(Italy) Gaia Maduzzi (Czech Republic) Julie Štruplová (Sweden) Lisa Zaar (Greece) Martha Matoula
October 20	Norman, United States; Hard; W35; Singles and doubles draws	(Italy) Francesca Pace; 6–3, 7–6^{(7–5)}	Ekaterina Khayrutdinova	(United States) Elvina Kalieva (United States) Jaeda Daniel	(Peru) Dana Guzmán (Egypt) Merna Refaat (United States) Victoria Osuigwe (United States) Savannah Broadus
October 20	Norman, United States; Hard; W35; Singles and doubles draws	(United States) Savannah Broadus (Netherlands) Rose Marie Nijkamp; 6–2, 6–3	(Spain) Maria Berlanga Bandera (Mexico) Julia García Ruiz	(United States) Elvina Kalieva (United States) Jaeda Daniel	(Peru) Dana Guzmán (Egypt) Merna Refaat (United States) Victoria Osuigwe (United States) Savannah Broadus
October 20	Tashkent, Uzbekistan; Hard; W15; Singles and doubles draws	Daria Khomutsianskaya; 6–2, 6–2	Daria Egorova	(Lithuania) Laima Vladson (China) Luo Xi	(India) Vaidehi Chaudhari; Ekaterina Tupitsyna (Belgium) Polina Bakhmutkina; Ekaterina Maklakova
October 20	Tashkent, Uzbekistan; Hard; W15; Singles and doubles draws	Daria Khomutsianskaya; Kseniya Yersh; 6–3, 2–6, [10–8]	(Kazakhstan) Asylzhan Arystanbekova (Kazakhstan) Ingkar Dyussebay	(Lithuania) Laima Vladson (China) Luo Xi	(India) Vaidehi Chaudhari; Ekaterina Tupitsyna (Belgium) Polina Bakhmutkina; Ekaterina Maklakova
October 20	Villena, Spain; Hard; W15; Singles and doubles draws	(Spain) Carmen López Martínez; 6–4, 6–2	(United States) Shannon Lam	(Italy) Enola Chiesa (Spain) Claudia Ferrer Pérez	(Spain) María García Cid (Spain) Lorena Solar Donoso (Turkey) Defne Çırpanlı (Italy) Federica Sacco
October 20	Villena, Spain; Hard; W15; Singles and doubles draws	(Germany) Elena Giovanna Giessler (Spain) Maria Oliver Sanchez; 6–4, 6–3	(Spain) Celia Cerviño Ruiz (Italy) Enola Chiesa	(Italy) Enola Chiesa (Spain) Claudia Ferrer Pérez	(Spain) María García Cid (Spain) Lorena Solar Donoso (Turkey) Defne Çırpanlı (Italy) Federica Sacco
October 20	Bol, Croatia; Clay; W15; Singles and doubles draws	(Slovenia) Pia Lovrič; 7–6^{(7–2)}, 6–2	(Serbia) Anastasija Cvetković	(Romania) Ilinca Sagmar (United States) Mia Horvit	(Slovakia) Laura Svatíková (Slovenia) Manca Pislak (Germany) Julia Rennert (Spain) Neus Torner Sensano
October 20	Bol, Croatia; Clay; W15; Singles and doubles draws	(Romania) Patricia Georgiana Goina (Austria) Mavie Österreicher; 6–3, 6–2	(Czech Republic) Nikola Břečková (France) Cindy Langlais	(Romania) Ilinca Sagmar (United States) Mia Horvit	(Slovakia) Laura Svatíková (Slovenia) Manca Pislak (Germany) Julia Rennert (Spain) Neus Torner Sensano
October 20	Sharm El Sheikh, Egypt; Hard; W15; Singles and doubles draws	(China) Sun Xinran; 6–1, 6–0	Valeriia Artemeva	(Egypt) Sandra Samir (Egypt) Lamis Alhussein Abdel Aziz	(Egypt) Yasmin Ezzat (Austria) Ekaterina Perelygina (Germany) Anja Wildgruber; Karine Sarkisova
October 20	Sharm El Sheikh, Egypt; Hard; W15; Singles and doubles draws	(Estonia) Andrea Roots (Moldova) Eva Zabolotnaia; 6–2, 1–6, [10–6]	(China) Sun Xinran (China) Xiao Lexue	(Egypt) Sandra Samir (Egypt) Lamis Alhussein Abdel Aziz	(Egypt) Yasmin Ezzat (Austria) Ekaterina Perelygina (Germany) Anja Wildgruber; Karine Sarkisova
October 20	Monastir, Tunisia; Hard; W15; Singles and doubles draws	(France) Ksenia Efremova; 6–3, 3–6, 6–2	(Ukraine) Masha Lazarenko	(France) Eleejah Inisan (France) Dune Vaissaud	(Italy) Francesca Dell'Edera (Italy) Beatrice Stagno (Japan) Riko Kikawada (Japan) Kayo Nishimura
October 20	Monastir, Tunisia; Hard; W15; Singles and doubles draws	(France) Ksenia Efremova (Italy) Beatrice Stagno; 6–4, 6–3	(Japan) Riko Kikawada (Poland) Dominika Podhajecka	(France) Eleejah Inisan (France) Dune Vaissaud	(Italy) Francesca Dell'Edera (Italy) Beatrice Stagno (Japan) Riko Kikawada (Japan) Kayo Nishimura
October 20	Hilton Head Island, United States; Clay; W15; Singles and doubles draws	(United States) Kennedy Drenser-Hagmann; 6–1, 2–6, 6–4	(United States) Annika Penickova	(United States) Janae Preston (Brazil) Carolina Bohrer Martins	(United Kingdom) Sofia Johnson (United States) Mia Slama (United States) Carson Tanguilig (United States) Jensen Diianni
October 20	Hilton Head Island, United States; Clay; W15; Singles and doubles draws	(Romania) Elena-Teodora Cadar (Bulgaria) Dia Evtimova; 6–1, 2–6, [10–4]	(United States) Bella Payne (United States) Sara Shumate	(United States) Janae Preston (Brazil) Carolina Bohrer Martins	(United Kingdom) Sofia Johnson (United States) Mia Slama (United States) Carson Tanguilig (United States) Jensen Diianni
October 27	Guanajuato Open; Irapuato, Mexico; Hard; W100; Singles – Doubles	(Canada) Marina Stakusic; 6–2, 6–2	(United States) Elvina Kalieva	(United States) Elizabeth Mandlik (Belgium) Hanne Vandewinkel	(Netherlands) Arantxa Rus (Italy) Diletta Cherubini (Bulgaria) Lia Karatancheva (United States) Usue Maitane Arconada
October 27	Guanajuato Open; Irapuato, Mexico; Hard; W100; Singles – Doubles	(United States) Dalayna Hewitt (United States) Victoria Hu; 6–4, 6–4	(Mexico) Victoria Rodríguez (Mexico) Ana Sofía Sánchez	(United States) Elizabeth Mandlik (Belgium) Hanne Vandewinkel	(Netherlands) Arantxa Rus (Italy) Diletta Cherubini (Bulgaria) Lia Karatancheva (United States) Usue Maitane Arconada
October 27	GB Pro-Series Glasgow; Glasgow, United Kingdom; Hard (i); W75; Singles and doubles draws	(Ukraine) Daria Snigur; 6–4, 6–3	(Switzerland) Susan Bandecchi	(Germany) Mona Barthel (Sweden) Kajsa Rinaldo Persson	(Spain) Kaitlin Quevedo (Estonia) Elena Malõgina (United Kingdom) Mimi Xu (Belgium) Sofia Costoulas
October 27	GB Pro-Series Glasgow; Glasgow, United Kingdom; Hard (i); W75; Singles and doubles draws	(Switzerland) Céline Naef (United States) Clervie Ngounoue; 6–0, 6–4	(United Kingdom) Freya Christie (United Kingdom) Lily Miyazaki	(Germany) Mona Barthel (Sweden) Kajsa Rinaldo Persson	(Spain) Kaitlin Quevedo (Estonia) Elena Malõgina (United Kingdom) Mimi Xu (Belgium) Sofia Costoulas
October 27	Tevlin Women's Challenger; Toronto, Canada; Hard (i); W75; Singles – Doubles	(United Kingdom) Harriet Dart; 6–2, 6–2	(United States) Fiona Crawley	(Canada) Kayla Cross (Canada) Katherine Sebov	(United States) Louisa Chirico (United Kingdom) Victoria Allen (Slovakia) Viktória Hrunčáková (United States) Ava Markham
October 27	Tevlin Women's Challenger; Toronto, Canada; Hard (i); W75; Singles – Doubles	(Slovakia) Viktória Hrunčáková; Anastasia Tikhonova; 6–4, 6–2	(United States) Fiona Crawley (United States) Jaeda Daniel	(Canada) Kayla Cross (Canada) Katherine Sebov	(United States) Louisa Chirico (United Kingdom) Victoria Allen (Slovakia) Viktória Hrunčáková (United States) Ava Markham
October 27	Brisbane QTC Tennis International; Brisbane, Australia; Hard; W35; Singles and doubles draws	(Australia) Taylah Preston; 6–2, 6–4	(Japan) Natsumi Kawaguchi	(China) Tian Fangran (Japan) Erika Sema	Arina Bulatova (United Kingdom) Naiktha Bains (Australia) Elena Micic (Japan) Reina Goto
October 27	Brisbane QTC Tennis International; Brisbane, Australia; Hard; W35; Singles and doubles draws	(New Zealand) Monique Barry (Japan) Natsumi Kawaguchi; 7–5, 6–3	(Australia) Tenika McGiffin (Japan) Naho Sato	(China) Tian Fangran (Japan) Erika Sema	Arina Bulatova (United Kingdom) Naiktha Bains (Australia) Elena Micic (Japan) Reina Goto
October 27	Makinohara, Japan; Carpet; W35; Singles and doubles draws	(Japan) Sara Saito; 6–1, 6–2	(South Korea) Back Da-yeon	(South Korea) Park So-hyun (Japan) Ayano Shimizu	(Japan) Eri Shimizu (Japan) Hiromi Abe (South Korea) Lee Eun-hye (Japan) Sakura Hosogi
October 27	Makinohara, Japan; Carpet; W35; Singles and doubles draws	(Japan) Sara Saito (Japan) Ayano Shimizu; 6–2, 6–4	(China) Chen Mengyi (Sweden) Tiana Tian Deng	(South Korea) Park So-hyun (Japan) Ayano Shimizu	(Japan) Eri Shimizu (Japan) Hiromi Abe (South Korea) Lee Eun-hye (Japan) Sakura Hosogi
October 27	Loulé, Portugal; Hard; W35; Singles and doubles draws	(South Korea) Ku Yeon-woo; 7–6^{(8–6)}, 6–3	(United States) Hibah Shaikh	(France) Alice Tubello (Portugal) Angelina Voloshchuk	(Netherlands) Stéphanie Visscher (Netherlands) Sarah van Emst (Portugal) Francisca Jorge (Lithuania) Justina Mikulskytė
October 27	Loulé, Portugal; Hard; W35; Singles and doubles draws	(Netherlands) Britt du Pree (Netherlands) Sarah van Emst; 6–3, 6–0	(Romania) Briana Szabó (Ukraine) Daria Yesypchuk	(France) Alice Tubello (Portugal) Angelina Voloshchuk	(Netherlands) Stéphanie Visscher (Netherlands) Sarah van Emst (Portugal) Francisca Jorge (Lithuania) Justina Mikulskytė
October 27	Villeneuve-d'Ascq, France; Hard (i); W35; Singles and doubles draws	(Netherlands) Anouck Vrancken Peeters; 4–6, 7–5, 6–4	(France) Amandine Monnot	(Ukraine) Veronika Podrez (France) Sara Cakarevic	(France) Harmony Tan (France) Yara Bartashevich (Poland) Martyna Kubka; Valeriia Iushchenko
October 27	Villeneuve-d'Ascq, France; Hard (i); W35; Singles and doubles draws	(Poland) Martyna Kubka (Greece) Sapfo Sakellaridi; 7–5, 6–1	(France) Diana Martynov (France) Marie Villet	(Ukraine) Veronika Podrez (France) Sara Cakarevic	(France) Harmony Tan (France) Yara Bartashevich (Poland) Martyna Kubka; Valeriia Iushchenko
October 27	Istanbul, Turkey; Hard (i); W35; Singles and doubles draws	Alexandra Shubladze; 6–2, 6–2	(Croatia) Lea Bošković	Alevtina Ibragimova; Ekaterina Reyngold	(Germany) Noma Noha Akugue (Netherlands) Coco Bosman (Poland) Urszula Radwańska (Croatia) Lucija Ćirić Bagarić
October 27	Istanbul, Turkey; Hard (i); W35; Singles and doubles draws	(Romania) Elena Ruxandra Bertea; Alevtina Ibragimova; 6–3, 6–2	Varvara Panshina; Daria Zelinskaya	Alevtina Ibragimova; Ekaterina Reyngold	(Germany) Noma Noha Akugue (Netherlands) Coco Bosman (Poland) Urszula Radwańska (Croatia) Lucija Ćirić Bagarić
October 27	Neuquén, Argentina; Clay; W35; Singles and doubles draws	(Argentina) Martina Capurro Taborda; 6–1, 6–0	(Chile) Fernanda Labraña	(Argentina) Berta Bonardi (Argentina) Victoria Bosio	(Argentina) Justina María González Daniele (Argentina) Maria Florencia Urrutia (Ecuador) Mell Reasco González (United States) Isabella Barrera Aguirre
October 27	Neuquén, Argentina; Clay; W35; Singles and doubles draws	(Chile) Jimar Gerald González (Ecuador) Mell Reasco González; 6–4, 2–6, [10–8]	(Italy) Miriana Tona (Argentina) Maria Florencia Urrutia	(Argentina) Berta Bonardi (Argentina) Victoria Bosio	(Argentina) Justina María González Daniele (Argentina) Maria Florencia Urrutia (Ecuador) Mell Reasco González (United States) Isabella Barrera Aguirre
October 27	Tashkent, Uzbekistan; Hard; W15; Singles and doubles draws	Daria Khomutsianskaya; 3–6, 6–2, 6–2	Daria Egorova	(India) Vaidehi Chaudhari (Hong Kong) Shek Cheuk-ying	Maria Kalyakina (Lithuania) Laima Vladson (India) Akanksha Nitture (Israel) Maayan Laron
October 27	Tashkent, Uzbekistan; Hard; W15; Singles and doubles draws	Daria Khomutsianskaya; Kseniya Yersh; 7–5, 7–5	(Kazakhstan) Asylzhan Arystanbekova (Kazakhstan) Ingkar Dyussebay	(India) Vaidehi Chaudhari (Hong Kong) Shek Cheuk-ying	Maria Kalyakina (Lithuania) Laima Vladson (India) Akanksha Nitture (Israel) Maayan Laron
October 27	Marsa, Malta; Hard; W15; Singles and doubles draws	(United Kingdom) Alice Gillan; 6–3, 6–3	(Croatia) Karla Popović	(Germany) Ann Akasha Ceuca (Italy) Enola Chiesa	(Serbia) Anja Stanković (Italy) Benedetta Ortenzi (Italy) Sofia Ferraris (Malta) Emma Montebello
October 27	Marsa, Malta; Hard; W15; Singles and doubles draws	(Serbia) Anja Stanković (Germany) Sonja Zhenikhova; 7–6^{(7–4)}, 6–4	(Czech Republic) Julie Jiráková (Malta) Emma Montebello	(Germany) Ann Akasha Ceuca (Italy) Enola Chiesa	(Serbia) Anja Stanković (Italy) Benedetta Ortenzi (Italy) Sofia Ferraris (Malta) Emma Montebello
October 27	Solarino, Italy; Carpet; W15; Singles and doubles draws	(Italy) Federica di Sarra; 6–2, 1–6, 6–1	(Italy) Deborah Chiesa	(Italy) Noemi Maines (Romania) Maria Toma	(Switzerland) Nicole Gadient (Italy) Marta Lombardini; Kseniia Ruchkina (Italy) Francesca Gandolfi
October 27	Solarino, Italy; Carpet; W15; Singles and doubles draws	(Italy) Carolina Gasparini; Kseniia Ruchkina; 6–3, 6–4	(Iran) Meshkatolzahra Safi (Germany) Vivien Sandberg	(Italy) Noemi Maines (Romania) Maria Toma	(Switzerland) Nicole Gadient (Italy) Marta Lombardini; Kseniia Ruchkina (Italy) Francesca Gandolfi
October 27	Täby, Sweden; Hard (i); W15; Singles and doubles draws	(Sweden) Caijsa Hennemann; 6–4, 7–6^{(7–3)}	(Sweden) Nellie Taraba Wallberg	(Lithuania) Andrė Lukošiūtė (Latvia) Beatrise Zeltiņa	(Finland) Ella Haavisto (Sweden) Lea Nilsson (Germany) Isabella Angelina Abendroth (Ukraine) Kateryna Lazarenko
October 27	Täby, Sweden; Hard (i); W15; Singles and doubles draws	(Ukraine) Kateryna Lazarenko (Latvia) Beatrise Zeltiņa; 6–2, 6–2	(Sweden) Linea Bajraliu (Sweden) Nellie Taraba Wallberg	(Lithuania) Andrė Lukošiūtė (Latvia) Beatrise Zeltiņa	(Finland) Ella Haavisto (Sweden) Lea Nilsson (Germany) Isabella Angelina Abendroth (Ukraine) Kateryna Lazarenko
October 27	Bol, Croatia; Clay; W15; Singles and doubles draws	(Serbia) Dunja Marić; 7–6^{(7–5)}, 7–6^{(7–4)}	(Czech Republic) Eliška Ticháčková	(Germany) Franziska Sziedat (United States) Mia Horvit	(Slovenia) Pia Lovrič (Romania) Patricia Georgiana Goina (Serbia) Anastasija Cvetković (Croatia) Ana Konjuh
October 27	Bol, Croatia; Clay; W15; Singles and doubles draws	(Czech Republic) Nikola Břečková (Czech Republic) Eliška Ticháčková; 7–5, 7–5	(United States) Mia Horvit (Switzerland) Marie Mettraux	(Germany) Franziska Sziedat (United States) Mia Horvit	(Slovenia) Pia Lovrič (Romania) Patricia Georgiana Goina (Serbia) Anastasija Cvetković (Croatia) Ana Konjuh
October 27	Sharm El Sheikh, Egypt; Hard; W15; Singles and doubles draws	(China) Sun Xinran; 6–1, 2–6, 6–2	Anna Pushkareva	(Egypt) Sandra Samir; Victoria Milovanova	(Serbia) Darja Suvirdjonkova (Egypt) Aya El Sayed; Karine Sarkisova (Poland) Daria Gorska
October 27	Sharm El Sheikh, Egypt; Hard; W15; Singles and doubles draws	(Egypt) Aya El Sayed (Egypt) Sandra Samir; 2–6, 6–4, [10–7]	Daria Belyaeva; Darya Kharlanova	(Egypt) Sandra Samir; Victoria Milovanova	(Serbia) Darja Suvirdjonkova (Egypt) Aya El Sayed; Karine Sarkisova (Poland) Daria Gorska
October 27	Monastir, Tunisia; Hard; W15; Singles and doubles draws	(Slovakia) Radka Zelníčková; 6–1, 6–3	(Germany) Marie Vogt	(Germany) Johanna Silva (Japan) Kayo Nishimura	(France) Louna Zoppas (Morocco) Diae El Jardi (Poland) Dominika Podhajecka (France) Margaux Komano
October 27	Monastir, Tunisia; Hard; W15; Singles and doubles draws	(Germany) Marie Vogt (Slovakia) Radka Zelníčková; 6–2, 6–0	(Japan) Riko Kikawada (Poland) Dominika Podhajecka	(Germany) Johanna Silva (Japan) Kayo Nishimura	(France) Louna Zoppas (Morocco) Diae El Jardi (Poland) Dominika Podhajecka (France) Margaux Komano
October 27	Sumter, United States; Clay; W15; Singles and doubles draws	(Netherlands) Rose Marie Nijkamp; 6–2, 7–5	(United States) Carson Tanguilig	(United States) Janae Preston (United States) Thea Frodin	(Netherlands) Jade Groen (United States) Capucine Jauffret (Sweden) Bella Bergqvist Larsson (Mexico) María Fernanda Navarro Oliva
October 27	Sumter, United States; Clay; W15; Singles and doubles draws	(United States) Jaedan Brown (United States) Carson Tanguilig; 6–2, 4–6, [10–6]	(United States) Bella Payne (United States) Sara Shumate	(United States) Janae Preston (United States) Thea Frodin	(Netherlands) Jade Groen (United States) Capucine Jauffret (Sweden) Bella Bergqvist Larsson (Mexico) María Fernanda Navarro Oliva

=== November ===
Week of	Tournament	Winner	Runners-up	Semifinalists	Quarterfinalists
November 3	Hamamatsu, Japan; Carpet; W35; Singles and doubles draws	(Japan) Momoko Kobori; 6–2, 6–4	(Japan) Eri Shimizu	(Japan) Sara Saito (South Korea) Lee Eun-hye	(Japan) Kisa Yoshioka (Japan) Misaki Matsuda (Japan) Hiromi Abe (Japan) Rinko Matsuda
November 3	Hamamatsu, Japan; Carpet; W35; Singles and doubles draws	(Japan) Hikaru Sato (Japan) Eri Shimizu; 6–3, 6–2	(Japan) Mana Ayukawa (Japan) Kanako Morisaki	(Japan) Sara Saito (South Korea) Lee Eun-hye	(Japan) Kisa Yoshioka (Japan) Misaki Matsuda (Japan) Hiromi Abe (Japan) Rinko Matsuda
November 3	Faro, Portugal; Hard; W35; Singles and doubles draws	(Spain) Marina Bassols Ribera; 1–6, 6–2, 6–1	(Netherlands) Britt du Pree	(Spain) Ángela Fita Boluda; Erika Andreeva	(Italy) Samira De Stefano (United States) Carolyn Ansari (Australia) Melisa Ercan (Germany) Eva Bennemann
November 3	Faro, Portugal; Hard; W35; Singles and doubles draws	(Germany) Josy Daems (Germany) Mina Hodzic; 6–3, 6–7^{(5–7)}, [11–9]	(India) Vasanti Shinde (Latvia) Elza Tomase	(Spain) Ángela Fita Boluda; Erika Andreeva	(Italy) Samira De Stefano (United States) Carolyn Ansari (Australia) Melisa Ercan (Germany) Eva Bennemann
November 3	Liberec, Czech Republic; Hard (i); W35; Singles and doubles draws	(France) Harmony Tan; 6–2, 6–1	(Japan) Mayuka Aikawa	(Czech Republic) Amy Suchá (Ukraine) Veronika Podrez	(Czech Republic) Julie Paštiková (Turkey) Çağla Büyükakçay (Czech Republic) Sarah Melany Fajmonová (Romania) Elena Ruxandra Bertea
November 3	Liberec, Czech Republic; Hard (i); W35; Singles and doubles draws	(Croatia) Lucija Ćirić Bagarić (Czech Republic) Lucie Havlíčková; 6–1, 6–1	(Czech Republic) Denisa Hindová (Czech Republic) Alena Kovačková	(Czech Republic) Amy Suchá (Ukraine) Veronika Podrez	(Czech Republic) Julie Paštiková (Turkey) Çağla Büyükakçay (Czech Republic) Sarah Melany Fajmonová (Romania) Elena Ruxandra Bertea
November 3	Orlando, United States; Clay; W35; Singles and doubles draws	(Netherlands) Eva Vedder; 6–3, 7–6^{(8–6)}	(Slovakia) Viktória Hrunčáková	(Serbia) Katarina Jokić (United States) Akasha Urhobo	(United States) Welles Newman (United States) Thea Frodin; Anastasiia Gureva (United States) Madison Sieg
November 3	Orlando, United States; Clay; W35; Singles and doubles draws	(United States) Samantha Alicea (United States) Malkia Ngounoue; 6–1, 6–7^{(5–7)}, [11–9]	(United States) Thea Frodin (United States) Welles Newman	(Serbia) Katarina Jokić (United States) Akasha Urhobo	(United States) Welles Newman (United States) Thea Frodin; Anastasiia Gureva (United States) Madison Sieg
November 3	Castellón, Spain; Clay; W15; Singles and doubles draws	(Germany) Joëlle Steur; 6–4, 6–2	(Spain) María García Cid	(Spain) Cristina Díaz Adrover (United States) Shannon Lam	(Spain) Celia Cerviño Ruiz (Spain) Lucía Cortez Llorca (Spain) Charo Esquiva Bañuls (Spain) Neus Torner Sensano
November 3	Castellón, Spain; Clay; W15; Singles and doubles draws	(Spain) Noelia Bouzó Zanotti (Germany) Joëlle Steur; 6–3, 6–2	(Spain) Celia Cerviño Ruiz (Switzerland) Marie Mettraux	(Spain) Cristina Díaz Adrover (United States) Shannon Lam	(Spain) Celia Cerviño Ruiz (Spain) Lucía Cortez Llorca (Spain) Charo Esquiva Bañuls (Spain) Neus Torner Sensano
November 3	Solarino, Italy; Carpet; W15; Singles and doubles draws	(Switzerland) Alina Granwehr; 6–4, 6–2	(Italy) Deborah Chiesa	(Italy) Verena Meliss (Germany) Julia Stusek	(Germany) Victoria Pohle (Italy) Noemi Maines; Kseniia Ruchkina (Italy) Camilla Zanolini
November 3	Solarino, Italy; Carpet; W15; Singles and doubles draws	(Germany) Victoria Pohle (Germany) Julia Stusek; 7–5, 6–2	(Iran) Meshkatolzahra Safi (Germany) Vivien Sandberg	(Italy) Verena Meliss (Germany) Julia Stusek	(Germany) Victoria Pohle (Italy) Noemi Maines; Kseniia Ruchkina (Italy) Camilla Zanolini
November 3	Szabolcsveresmart, Hungary; Hard (i); W15; Singles and doubles draws	(Czech Republic) Ivana Šebestová; 7–5, 6–4	Sofya Lansere	(Hungary) Adrienn Nagy (Ukraine) Kateryna Lazarenko	(Romania) Patricia Georgiana Goina (Czech Republic) Denisa Žoldáková (Hungary) Anna Mihálka (Poland) Maja Pawelska
November 3	Szabolcsveresmart, Hungary; Hard (i); W15; Singles and doubles draws	(Poland) Maja Pawelska (Czech Republic) Denisa Žoldáková; 6–3, 6–4	(Romania) Patricia Georgiana Goina (Ukraine) Anastasiya Zaparyniuk	(Hungary) Adrienn Nagy (Ukraine) Kateryna Lazarenko	(Romania) Patricia Georgiana Goina (Czech Republic) Denisa Žoldáková (Hungary) Anna Mihálka (Poland) Maja Pawelska
November 3	Heraklion, Greece; Clay; W15; Singles and doubles draws	(Greece) Elena Korokozidi; 7–5, 6–3	Daria Lodikova	(Greece) Sapfo Sakellaridi (Italy) Sofia Rocchetti	(France) Maëlys Bougrat (Germany) Ann Akasha Ceuca (Germany) Pia Praefke (Belgium) Tilwith Di Girolami
November 3	Heraklion, Greece; Clay; W15; Singles and doubles draws	(Greece) Elena Korokozidi; Vlada Svarkovskaia; 6–3, 1–6, [10–8]	(Greece) Marianne Argyrokastriti (Greece) Sapfo Sakellaridi	(Greece) Sapfo Sakellaridi (Italy) Sofia Rocchetti	(France) Maëlys Bougrat (Germany) Ann Akasha Ceuca (Germany) Pia Praefke (Belgium) Tilwith Di Girolami
November 3	Antalya, Turkey; Clay; W15; Singles and doubles draws	(Romania) Anamaria Oana; 6–3, 6–3	(Romania) Diana-Ioana Simionescu	(Armenia) Ani Amiraghyan (Sweden) Fanny Norin	(Switzerland) Anais Gabriel; Valeriia Iushchenko (Poland) Marcelina Podlińska (Latvia) Marija Lauva
November 3	Antalya, Turkey; Clay; W15; Singles and doubles draws	(Armenia) Ani Amiraghyan (Turkey) Ada Kumru; 6–3, 6–2	(Romania) Alexandra Irina Anghel; Mariia Masiianskaia	(Armenia) Ani Amiraghyan (Sweden) Fanny Norin	(Switzerland) Anais Gabriel; Valeriia Iushchenko (Poland) Marcelina Podlińska (Latvia) Marija Lauva
November 3	Sharm El Sheikh, Egypt; Hard; W15; Singles and doubles draws	(Egypt) Sandra Samir; 4–6, 6–3, 7–5	(Egypt) Lamis Alhussein Abdel Aziz	(United Kingdom) Lauryn John-Baptiste; Varvara Panshina	(Kazakhstan) Aruzhan Sagandykova; Anna Pushkareva; Evgeniya Burdina (Egypt) Hania Abouelsaad
November 3	Sharm El Sheikh, Egypt; Hard; W15; Singles and doubles draws	Varvara Panshina; Daria Zelinskaya; 6–4, 5–7, [13–11]	(Egypt) Aya El Sayed (Egypt) Nada Fouad	(United Kingdom) Lauryn John-Baptiste; Varvara Panshina	(Kazakhstan) Aruzhan Sagandykova; Anna Pushkareva; Evgeniya Burdina (Egypt) Hania Abouelsaad
November 3	Monastir, Tunisia; Hard; W15; Singles and doubles draws	(Germany) Mara Guth; 6–3, 4–6, 7–6^{(7–2)}	(Latvia) Beatrise Zeltiņa	(Cameroon) Karine Marion Job (Belgium) Tamila Gadamauri	(Slovakia) Radka Zelníčková (United States) Raveena Kingsley (Germany) Johanna Silva (Poland) Inka Wawrzkiewicz
November 3	Monastir, Tunisia; Hard; W15; Singles and doubles draws	(Morocco) Diae El Jardi (Poland) Dominika Podhajecka; 5–7, 6–3, [10–7]	(Belgium) Tamila Gadamauri (Belgium) Romane Longueville	(Cameroon) Karine Marion Job (Belgium) Tamila Gadamauri	(Slovakia) Radka Zelníčková (United States) Raveena Kingsley (Germany) Johanna Silva (Poland) Inka Wawrzkiewicz
November 3	Lincoln, United States; Hard (i); W15; Singles and doubles draws	Edda Mamedova; 6–0, 6–2	(Slovakia) Irina Balus	(United States) Anna Frey (Argentina) Lucía Peyre	(Kazakhstan) Sonja Zhiyenbayeva (Slovenia) Kristina Novak (Denmark) Emma Kamper (United States) Aspen Schuman
November 3	Lincoln, United States; Hard (i); W15; Singles and doubles draws	(United States) Kolie Allen (United States) Megan Heuser; 6–3, 6–3	(Israel) Mika Buchnik; Edda Mamedova	(United States) Anna Frey (Argentina) Lucía Peyre	(Kazakhstan) Sonja Zhiyenbayeva (Slovenia) Kristina Novak (Denmark) Emma Kamper (United States) Aspen Schuman
November 3	Neuquén, Argentina; Clay; W15; Singles and doubles draws	(Argentina) Victoria Bosio; 7–5, 6–1	(Argentina) Justina María González Daniele	(United States) Isabella Barrera Aguirre (Ecuador) Mell Reasco González	(Argentina) Luciana Moyano (Brazil) Júlia Konishi Camargo Silva (Argentina) Marina Bulbarella (Argentina) Emily Zornada
November 3	Neuquén, Argentina; Clay; W15; Singles and doubles draws	(United States) Isabella Barrera Aguirre (Brazil) Júlia Konishi Camargo Silva; 6–3, 6–2	(Argentina) Justina María González Daniele (Argentina) Luciana Moyano	(United States) Isabella Barrera Aguirre (Ecuador) Mell Reasco González	(Argentina) Luciana Moyano (Brazil) Júlia Konishi Camargo Silva (Argentina) Marina Bulbarella (Argentina) Emily Zornada
November 10	Brisbane QTC Tennis International; Brisbane, Australia; Hard; W50; Singles and doubles draws	(United Kingdom) Katie Swan; 3–6, 6–3, 6–3	(China) Wei Sijia	(Australia) Taylah Preston (Australia) Emerson Jones	(Japan) Miho Kuramochi (Japan) Ayumi Koshiishi (Australia) Destanee Aiava (Japan) Mei Yamaguchi
November 10	Brisbane QTC Tennis International; Brisbane, Australia; Hard; W50; Singles and doubles draws	(Australia) Destanee Aiava (Australia) Maddison Inglis; 7–6^{(7–3)}, 7–6^{(9–7)}	(Australia) Gabriella Da Silva-Fick (Australia) Tenika McGiffin	(Australia) Taylah Preston (Australia) Emerson Jones	(Japan) Miho Kuramochi (Japan) Ayumi Koshiishi (Australia) Destanee Aiava (Japan) Mei Yamaguchi
November 10	Funchal, Portugal; Hard; W50; Singles and doubles draws	(Germany) Tamara Korpatsch; 5–7, 7–5, 6–1	(Sweden) Lea Nilsson	(Italy) Samira De Stefano (Spain) Eva Guerrero Álvarez	(Ukraine) Anastasiia Sobolieva; Erika Andreeva (France) Margaux Rouvroy (Germany) Mina Hodzic
November 10	Funchal, Portugal; Hard; W50; Singles and doubles draws	(United Kingdom) Holly Hutchinson (United Kingdom) Ella McDonald; 6–2, 4–6, [10–8]	(Belgium) Polina Bakhmutkina (Germany) Mina Hodzic	(Italy) Samira De Stefano (Spain) Eva Guerrero Álvarez	(Ukraine) Anastasiia Sobolieva; Erika Andreeva (France) Margaux Rouvroy (Germany) Mina Hodzic
November 10	Heraklion, Greece; Clay; W50; Singles and doubles draws	(Spain) Guiomar Maristany; 2–6, 6–2, 6–2	(Italy) Lisa Pigato	(Spain) Sara Dols (Czech Republic) Julie Štruplová	(Spain) Andrea Lázaro García (Italy) Sofia Rocchetti (France) Séléna Janicijevic (Italy) Jennifer Ruggeri
November 10	Heraklion, Greece; Clay; W50; Singles and doubles draws	(Spain) Andrea Lázaro García (Spain) Guiomar Maristany; Walkover	(Greece) Marianne Argyrokastriti (Ukraine) Kateryna Diatlova	(Spain) Sara Dols (Czech Republic) Julie Štruplová	(Spain) Andrea Lázaro García (Italy) Sofia Rocchetti (France) Séléna Janicijevic (Italy) Jennifer Ruggeri
November 10	Austin, United States; Hard; W50; Singles and doubles draws	(United States) Mary Stoiana; 2–6, 6–3, 6–4	(Japan) Mai Hontama	Anastasia Gasanova; Ekaterina Khayrutdinova	(Egypt) Merna Refaat (Venezuela) Sofia Elena Cabezas Domínguez (United States) Fiona Crawley (United States) Kayla Day
November 10	Austin, United States; Hard; W50; Singles and doubles draws	(United States) Savannah Broadus (Kazakhstan) Sonja Zhiyenbayeva; 6–3, 6–3	(United States) Victoria Osuigwe (United States) Alana Smith	Anastasia Gasanova; Ekaterina Khayrutdinova	(Egypt) Merna Refaat (Venezuela) Sofia Elena Cabezas Domínguez (United States) Fiona Crawley (United States) Kayla Day
November 10	Chihuahua, Mexico; Hard; W50; Singles and doubles draws	Anastasia Tikhonova; 6–4, 7–5	(United States) Hina Inoue	(United States) Anna Rogers (Canada) Kayla Cross	(Poland) Zuzanna Pawlikowska (Slovenia) Kristina Novak (Canada) Ariana Arseneault (France) Julie Belgraver
November 10	Chihuahua, Mexico; Hard; W50; Singles and doubles draws	(Canada) Ariana Arseneault (Canada) Raphaëlle Lacasse; 2–6, 7–6^{(7–4)}, [10–6]	(Mexico) María Fernanda Navarro Oliva (Canada) Alexandra Vagramov	(United States) Anna Rogers (Canada) Kayla Cross	(Poland) Zuzanna Pawlikowska (Slovenia) Kristina Novak (Canada) Ariana Arseneault (France) Julie Belgraver
November 10	Orlando, United States; Clay; W35; Singles and doubles draws	(Hungary) Luca Udvardy; 6–3, 6–3	(Greece) Martha Matoula	(United States) Victoria Hu (Kenya) Angella Okutoyi	(Netherlands) Eva Vedder (United States) Akasha Urhobo (Bulgaria) Gergana Topalova (Italy) Francesca Pace
November 10	Orlando, United States; Clay; W35; Singles and doubles draws	(Kenya) Angella Okutoyi (Italy) Francesca Pace; 3–6, 6–4, [14–12]	(United States) Allura Zamarripa (United States) Maribella Zamarripa	(United States) Victoria Hu (Kenya) Angella Okutoyi	(Netherlands) Eva Vedder (United States) Akasha Urhobo (Bulgaria) Gergana Topalova (Italy) Francesca Pace
November 10	Hua Hin, Thailand; Hard; W15; Singles and doubles draws	(China) Li Zongyu; 6–3, 6–3	(Thailand) Anchisa Chanta	(Thailand) Patcharin Cheapchandej (China) Wang Yuhan	(China) Wang Jiayi (Thailand) Peangtarn Plipuech (Thailand) Thasaporn Naklo; Ulyana Hrabavets
November 10	Hua Hin, Thailand; Hard; W15; Singles and doubles draws	(Thailand) Patcharin Cheapchandej (Thailand) Kamonwan Yodpetch; 6–2, 6–3	(Thailand) Thasaporn Naklo (Thailand) Lidia Podgorichani	(Thailand) Patcharin Cheapchandej (China) Wang Yuhan	(China) Wang Jiayi (Thailand) Peangtarn Plipuech (Thailand) Thasaporn Naklo; Ulyana Hrabavets
November 10	Phan Thiết, Vietnam; Hard; W15; Singles and doubles draws	(China) Wang Jiaqi; 6–0, 6–4	(France) Eleejah Inisan	(Slovakia) Viktória Morvayová (United States) Amy Zhu	(Japan) Reina Goto (Japan) Rinko Matsuda (Japan) Anri Nagata; Kristiana Sidorova
November 10	Phan Thiết, Vietnam; Hard; W15; Singles and doubles draws	(South Korea) Im Hee-rae (South Korea) Kim Eun-chae; 6–3, 7–6^{(7–1)}	(Japan) Reina Goto (Japan) Rinko Matsuda	(Slovakia) Viktória Morvayová (United States) Amy Zhu	(Japan) Reina Goto (Japan) Rinko Matsuda (Japan) Anri Nagata; Kristiana Sidorova
November 10	Nules, Spain; Clay; W15; Singles and doubles draws	(Spain) Aran Teixidó García; 7–6^{(7–4)}, 6–1	(France) Océane Babel	(Turkey) Defne Çırpanlı (Spain) Neus Torner Sensano	(Spain) Cristina Díaz Adrover (Italy) Laura Mair (Spain) María García Cid (Serbia) Mila Mašić
November 10	Nules, Spain; Clay; W15; Singles and doubles draws	(Spain) Noelia Bouzó Zanotti (Germany) Joëlle Steur; 6–0, 6–2	(Italy) Enola Chiesa (Italy) Laura Mair	(Turkey) Defne Çırpanlı (Spain) Neus Torner Sensano	(Spain) Cristina Díaz Adrover (Italy) Laura Mair (Spain) María García Cid (Serbia) Mila Mašić
November 10	Solarino, Italy; Carpet; W15; Singles and doubles draws	(Italy) Deborah Chiesa; 6–4, 6–4	(Switzerland) Fiona Ganz	(Germany) Julia Stusek (Italy) Camilla Zanolini	(Romania) Maria Toma; Vlada Mincheva (Italy) Federica di Sarra (Ukraine) Yeva Galiievska
November 10	Solarino, Italy; Carpet; W15; Singles and doubles draws	(Germany) Victoria Pohle (Germany) Julia Stusek; 6–0, 6–1	(Switzerland) Nicole Gadient (Germany) Anja Wildgruber	(Germany) Julia Stusek (Italy) Camilla Zanolini	(Romania) Maria Toma; Vlada Mincheva (Italy) Federica di Sarra (Ukraine) Yeva Galiievska
November 10	Antalya, Turkey; Clay; W15; Singles and doubles draws	Valeriia Iushchenko; 3–6, 6–4, 6–4	(Brazil) Victoria Luiza Barros	(Georgia (country)) Sofia Shapatava; Felitsata Dorofeeva-Rybas	Anna Kartseva (Romania) Eva Maria Ionescu (Turkey) Ada Kumru (Romania) Diana-Ioana Simionescu
November 10	Antalya, Turkey; Clay; W15; Singles and doubles draws	(Brazil) Victoria Luiza Barros (Turkey) Ada Kumru; 6–4, 5–7, [10–7]	(Georgia (country)) Sofia Shapatava (Germany) Angelina Wirges	(Georgia (country)) Sofia Shapatava; Felitsata Dorofeeva-Rybas	Anna Kartseva (Romania) Eva Maria Ionescu (Turkey) Ada Kumru (Romania) Diana-Ioana Simionescu
November 10	Sharm El Sheikh, Egypt; Hard; W15; Singles and doubles draws	(Egypt) Sandra Samir; 2–6, 7–6^{(7–3)}, 7–6^{(7–3)}	(Egypt) Lamis Alhussein Abdel Aziz	Anna Kubareva; Anastasia Lizunova	(Czech Republic) Amelie Justine Hejtmanek (Switzerland) Kristyna Paul; Maria Golovina (Belgium) Lisa Claeys
November 10	Sharm El Sheikh, Egypt; Hard; W15; Singles and doubles draws	(Germany) Karla Bartel (Czech Republic) Amelie Justine Hejtmanek; 6–3, 6–2	Daria Belyaeva; Polina Starkova	Anna Kubareva; Anastasia Lizunova	(Czech Republic) Amelie Justine Hejtmanek (Switzerland) Kristyna Paul; Maria Golovina (Belgium) Lisa Claeys
November 10	Monastir, Tunisia; Hard; W15; Singles and doubles draws	(Serbia) Luna Vujović; 7–6^{(7–3)}, 7–6^{(8–6)}	(Belgium) Tamila Gadamauri	(Italy) Arianna Zucchini (France) Laïa Petretic	(Poland) Amelia Paszun (United States) Kate Mansfield (France) Helena Stevic (Poland) Inka Wawrzkiewicz
November 10	Monastir, Tunisia; Hard; W15; Singles and doubles draws	(Belgium) Tamila Gadamauri (France) Marie Villet; 6–2, 6–1	(Poland) Amelia Paszun (Poland) Inka Wawrzkiewicz	(Italy) Arianna Zucchini (France) Laïa Petretic	(Poland) Amelia Paszun (United States) Kate Mansfield (France) Helena Stevic (Poland) Inka Wawrzkiewicz
November 10	Clemson, United States; Hard; W15; Singles and doubles draws	(United States) DJ Bennett; 6–3, 7–6^{(7–4)}	(United States) Bella Payne	(Czech Republic) Amélie Šmejkalová (Netherlands) Rose Marie Nijkamp	(United States) Emma Charney (Canada) Annabelle Xu (United States) Kylie McKenzie (United States) Aspen Schuman
November 10	Clemson, United States; Hard; W15; Singles and doubles draws	(United States) Bella Payne (United States) Carson Tanguilig; 6–2, 6–2	(Slovakia) Romana Čisovská (Spain) Candela Yecora	(Czech Republic) Amélie Šmejkalová (Netherlands) Rose Marie Nijkamp	(United States) Emma Charney (Canada) Annabelle Xu (United States) Kylie McKenzie (United States) Aspen Schuman
November 10	Criciúma, Brazil; Clay; W15; Singles and doubles draws	(Brazil) Luiza Fullana; 7–5, 3–6, 6–2	(Argentina) Berta Bonardi	(Argentina) Justina María González Daniele (Slovakia) Karolína Krajmer	(Brazil) Maria Eduarda Carbone dos Santos (Argentina) Luciana Moyano (France) Cindy Langlais (Czech Republic) Sofie Hettlerová
November 10	Criciúma, Brazil; Clay; W15; Singles and doubles draws	(Argentina) Justina María González Daniele (Argentina) Luciana Moyano; 7–6^{(7–5)}, 4–6, [10–4]	(Brazil) Luiza Fullana (Brazil) Júlia Konishi Camargo Silva	(Argentina) Justina María González Daniele (Slovakia) Karolína Krajmer	(Brazil) Maria Eduarda Carbone dos Santos (Argentina) Luciana Moyano (France) Cindy Langlais (Czech Republic) Sofie Hettlerová
November 17	Takasaki Open; Takasaki, Japan; Hard; W100; Singles – Doubles	(Japan) Himeno Sakatsume; 6–3, 1–6, 6–4	(South Korea) Ku Yeon-woo	(China) Zhang Shuai (Thailand) Lanlana Tararudee	Darya Astakhova (Japan) Nao Hibino (Kazakhstan) Zarina Diyas (Japan) Rina Saigo
November 17	Takasaki Open; Takasaki, Japan; Hard; W100; Singles – Doubles	(Japan) Momoko Kobori (Japan) Ayano Shimizu; 3–6, 7–5, [12–10]	(Chinese Taipei) Lee Ya-hsin (China) Ye Qiuyu	(China) Zhang Shuai (Thailand) Lanlana Tararudee	Darya Astakhova (Japan) Nao Hibino (Kazakhstan) Zarina Diyas (Japan) Rina Saigo
November 17	NSW Open; Sydney, Australia; Hard; W75; Singles – Doubles	(Australia) Talia Gibson; 6–2, 6–4	(Australia) Emerson Jones	(Australia) Kimberly Birrell (Australia) Storm Hunter	(Chinese Taipei) Yang Ya-yi (Japan) Mei Yamaguchi (China) Tian Fangran (Australia) Elena Micic
November 17	NSW Open; Sydney, Australia; Hard; W75; Singles – Doubles	(Japan) Hiromi Abe (Japan) Ikumi Yamazaki; 6–4, 6–4	(Australia) Petra Hule (Australia) Elena Micic	(Australia) Kimberly Birrell (Australia) Storm Hunter	(Chinese Taipei) Yang Ya-yi (Japan) Mei Yamaguchi (China) Tian Fangran (Australia) Elena Micic
November 17	Kyotec Open; Pétange, Luxembourg; Hard (i); W75; Singles – Doubles	(Germany) Eva Bennemann; 6–3, 6–2	(Belgium) Jeline Vandromme	(Uzbekistan) Maria Timofeeva (Czech Republic) Barbora Palicová	Oksana Selekhmeteva (Germany) Mona Barthel (Spain) Marina Bassols Ribera (Cyprus) Raluca Șerban
November 17	Kyotec Open; Pétange, Luxembourg; Hard (i); W75; Singles – Doubles	(United Kingdom) Emily Appleton (Belgium) Magali Kempen; 6–3, 3–6, [10–6]	(Spain) Yvonne Cavallé Reimers (Italy) Angelica Moratelli	(Uzbekistan) Maria Timofeeva (Czech Republic) Barbora Palicová	Oksana Selekhmeteva (Germany) Mona Barthel (Spain) Marina Bassols Ribera (Cyprus) Raluca Șerban
November 17	Empire Women's Indoor; Trnava, Slovakia; Hard (i); W50; Singles and doubles draws	(Czech Republic) Lucie Havlíčková; 6–4, 3–6, 7–6^{(7–3)}	(Bulgaria) Elizara Yaneva	(France) Jessika Ponchet (United Kingdom) Lily Miyazaki	(Romania) Elena Ruxandra Bertea; Kira Pavlova (United Kingdom) Amarni Banks (Germany) Tamara Korpatsch
November 17	Empire Women's Indoor; Trnava, Slovakia; Hard (i); W50; Singles and doubles draws	(United Kingdom) Alicia Dudeney (Estonia) Elena Malõgina; 3–6, 6–3, [10–6]	Sofya Lansere (Czech Republic) Ivana Šebestová	(France) Jessika Ponchet (United Kingdom) Lily Miyazaki	(Romania) Elena Ruxandra Bertea; Kira Pavlova (United Kingdom) Amarni Banks (Germany) Tamara Korpatsch
November 17	Chihuahua, Mexico; Hard; W50; Singles and doubles draws	(United States) Mary Stoiana; 7–6^{(7–2)}, 6–7^{(6–8)}, 6–2	(Canada) Kayla Cross	(Mexico) María Fernanda Navarro Oliva (United States) Hina Inoue	(United States) Dalayna Hewitt (United States) Anna Rogers (Mexico) Sabastiani León; Anastasia Tikhonova
November 17	Chihuahua, Mexico; Hard; W50; Singles and doubles draws	(United States) Dalayna Hewitt (United States) Anna Rogers; 6–3, 6–0	(Canada) Ariana Arseneault (Canada) Raphaëlle Lacasse	(Mexico) María Fernanda Navarro Oliva (United States) Hina Inoue	(United States) Dalayna Hewitt (United States) Anna Rogers (Mexico) Sabastiani León; Anastasia Tikhonova
November 17	Heraklion, Greece; Clay; W35; Singles and doubles draws	(Serbia) Natalija Senić; 1–6, 7–5, 6–3	(Czech Republic) Eliška Ticháčková	(Greece) Elena Korokozidi (Italy) Isabella Maria Șerban	(Spain) Guiomar Maristany (Italy) Anastasia Abbagnato (Serbia) Draginja Vuković (France) Séléna Janicijevic
November 17	Heraklion, Greece; Clay; W35; Singles and doubles draws	(Romania) Bianca Bărbulescu (Bulgaria) Rositsa Dencheva; Walkover	(Slovakia) Laura Svatíková (Serbia) Draginja Vuković	(Greece) Elena Korokozidi (Italy) Isabella Maria Șerban	(Spain) Guiomar Maristany (Italy) Anastasia Abbagnato (Serbia) Draginja Vuković (France) Séléna Janicijevic
November 17	Antalya, Turkey; Clay; W35; Singles and doubles draws	(Sweden) Caijsa Hennemann; 4–6, 7–6^{(7–2)}, 6–4	(Czech Republic) Julie Štruplová	(Germany) Antonia Schmidt (Spain) Ángela Fita Boluda	(Hungary) Amarissa Tóth (Romania) Eva Maria Ionescu (Switzerland) Fiona Ganz; Valeriia Iushchenko
November 17	Antalya, Turkey; Clay; W35; Singles and doubles draws	Amina Anshba (Hungary) Amarissa Tóth; 7–5, 7–5	(Romania) Ilinca Amariei (Croatia) Lucija Ćirić Bagarić	(Germany) Antonia Schmidt (Spain) Ángela Fita Boluda	(Hungary) Amarissa Tóth (Romania) Eva Maria Ionescu (Switzerland) Fiona Ganz; Valeriia Iushchenko
November 17	Boca Raton, United States; Clay; W35; Singles and doubles draws	(Italy) Francesca Pace; 4–6, 6–4, 6–4	(United States) Akasha Urhobo	(Bulgaria) Gergana Topalova (United States) Victoria Hu	(United States) Bella Payne (Venezuela) Sofía Elena Cabezas Domínguez (United States) Rasheeda McAdoo (United States) Kylie Collins
November 17	Boca Raton, United States; Clay; W35; Singles and doubles draws	(Bosnia and Herzegovina) Ema Burgić (Ukraine) Anita Sahdiieva; 1–6, 7–6^{(7–5)}, [11–9]	(United States) Rasheeda McAdoo (United States) Akasha Urhobo	(Bulgaria) Gergana Topalova (United States) Victoria Hu	(United States) Bella Payne (Venezuela) Sofía Elena Cabezas Domínguez (United States) Rasheeda McAdoo (United States) Kylie Collins
November 17	Hua Hin, Thailand; Hard; W15; Singles and doubles draws	(Thailand) Anchisa Chanta; 6–1, 1–6, 6–3	(Thailand) Thasaporn Naklo	(Thailand) Patcharin Cheapchandej (Thailand) Kamonwan Yodpetch	(South Korea) Jang Soo-ha (Japan) Miyu Nakashima (China) Wang Yuhan; Ulyana Hrabavets
November 17	Hua Hin, Thailand; Hard; W15; Singles and doubles draws	(Thailand) Patcharin Cheapchandej (Thailand) Kamonwan Yodpetch; 6–4, 3–6, [11–9]	Ulyana Hrabavets (Thailand) Lidia Podgorichani	(Thailand) Patcharin Cheapchandej (Thailand) Kamonwan Yodpetch	(South Korea) Jang Soo-ha (Japan) Miyu Nakashima (China) Wang Yuhan; Ulyana Hrabavets
November 17	Phan Thiết, Vietnam; Hard; W15; Singles and doubles draws	(Japan) Reina Goto; 4–6, 6–4, 6–3	(Hong Kong) Shek Cheuk-ying	(France) Eleejah Inisan (Japan) Rinko Matsuda	(China) Wang Jiaqi (India) Zeel Desai (Japan) Suzuna Oigawa (Japan) Anri Nagata
November 17	Phan Thiết, Vietnam; Hard; W15; Singles and doubles draws	(South Korea) Im Hee-rae (South Korea) Kim Eun-chae; 7–6^{(7–3)}, 6–1	(Japan) Reina Goto (Japan) Rinko Matsuda	(France) Eleejah Inisan (Japan) Rinko Matsuda	(China) Wang Jiaqi (India) Zeel Desai (Japan) Suzuna Oigawa (Japan) Anri Nagata
November 17	Alcalá de Henares, Spain; Hard; W15; Singles and doubles draws	(Spain) Didi Bredberg Canizares; 6–7^{(6–8)}, 6–4, 6–1	(Germany) Ann Akasha Ceuca	(United States) Kate Mansfield (Hong Kong) Adithya Karunaratne	(France) Jade Bornay (Latvia) Diāna Marcinkēviča; Aleksandra Pozarenko (Spain) Claudia Ferrer Pérez
November 17	Alcalá de Henares, Spain; Hard; W15; Singles and doubles draws	(France) Jade Bornay (France) Jenny Lim; 6–4, 2–6, [10–5]	(Switzerland) Paula Cembranos (Serbia) Mila Mašić	(United States) Kate Mansfield (Hong Kong) Adithya Karunaratne	(France) Jade Bornay (Latvia) Diāna Marcinkēviča; Aleksandra Pozarenko (Spain) Claudia Ferrer Pérez
November 17	Lousada, Portugal; Hard (i); W35; Singles and doubles draws	(Sweden) Linea Bajraliu; 7–6^{(7–1)}, 6–4	(Italy) Enola Chiesa	(Latvia) Sabīne Rutlauka (United Kingdom) Ella McDonald	(Netherlands) Klara Veldman (Spain) Lorena Solar Donoso (Germany) Valentina Steiner (Germany) Mariella Thamm
November 17	Lousada, Portugal; Hard (i); W35; Singles and doubles draws	(Spain) Celia Cerviño Ruiz (Italy) Valentina Losciale; 6–3, 6–3	(United States) Baylen Brown (United States) Jamilah Snells	(Latvia) Sabīne Rutlauka (United Kingdom) Ella McDonald	(Netherlands) Klara Veldman (Spain) Lorena Solar Donoso (Germany) Valentina Steiner (Germany) Mariella Thamm
November 17	Sharm El Sheikh, Egypt; Hard; W15; Singles and doubles draws	Daria Khomutsianskaya; 6–3, 6–3	Polina Kuharenko	(Greece) Valentini Grammatikopoulou (United States) Brandelyn Fulgenzi	Ekaterina Tupitsyna (Kazakhstan) Aruzhan Sagandykova; Anna Kubareva (Sweden) Jacqueline Cabaj Awad
November 17	Sharm El Sheikh, Egypt; Hard; W15; Singles and doubles draws	Daria Khomutsianskaya; Anna Kubareva; 7–6^{(7–2)}, 7–5	(Greece) Valentini Grammatikopoulou (Czech Republic) Amelie Justine Hejtmanek	(Greece) Valentini Grammatikopoulou (United States) Brandelyn Fulgenzi	Ekaterina Tupitsyna (Kazakhstan) Aruzhan Sagandykova; Anna Kubareva (Sweden) Jacqueline Cabaj Awad
November 17	Monastir, Tunisia; Hard; W15; Singles and doubles draws	(Sweden) Nellie Taraba Wallberg; 6–0, 6–4	(United Kingdom) Esther Adeshina	(Italy) Arianna Zucchini (France) Marie Villet	(France) Lucie Pawlak (Serbia) Luna Vujović (France) Laïa Petretic (France) Maëlle Leclercq
November 17	Monastir, Tunisia; Hard; W15; Singles and doubles draws	(France) Lucie Pawlak (Sweden) Isabella Svahn; 6–4, 4–6, [10–8]	(Czech Republic) Emma Slavíková (Serbia) Luna Vujović	(Italy) Arianna Zucchini (France) Marie Villet	(France) Lucie Pawlak (Serbia) Luna Vujović (France) Laïa Petretic (France) Maëlle Leclercq
November 17	Mogi das Cruzes, Brazil; Clay; W15; Singles and doubles draws	(Brazil) Luiza Fullana; 6–3, 6–3	(Argentina) Carla Markus	(Brazil) Thaísa Grana Pedretti (Argentina) Justina María González Daniele	(Brazil) Júlia Konishi Camargo Silva (Switzerland) Marie Mettraux (Argentina) Berta Bonardi (Argentina) Candela Vázquez
November 17	Mogi das Cruzes, Brazil; Clay; W15; Singles and doubles draws	(Brazil) Luiza Fullana (Brazil) Thaísa Grana Pedretti; 6–2, 6–0	(Jamaica) Najah Dawson (Brazil) Marjorie Souza	(Brazil) Thaísa Grana Pedretti (Argentina) Justina María González Daniele	(Brazil) Júlia Konishi Camargo Silva (Switzerland) Marie Mettraux (Argentina) Berta Bonardi (Argentina) Candela Vázquez
November 24	City of Playford Tennis International; Playford, Australia; Hard; W75; Singles – Doubles	(Australia) Emerson Jones; 6–4, 6–4	(Australia) Maddison Inglis	(Australia) Taylah Preston (Australia) Talia Gibson	(Ukraine) Yuliia Starodubtseva (China) Wei Sijia (China) Tian Fangran (Australia) Elena Micic
November 24	City of Playford Tennis International; Playford, Australia; Hard; W75; Singles – Doubles	(Australia) Talia Gibson (Australia) Maddison Inglis; 6–2, 6–0	(South Korea) Back Da-yeon (South Korea) Lee Eun-hye	(Australia) Taylah Preston (Australia) Talia Gibson	(Ukraine) Yuliia Starodubtseva (China) Wei Sijia (China) Tian Fangran (Australia) Elena Micic
November 24	Fujairah Championships; Fujairah, United Arab Emirates; Hard; W75; Singles – Doubles	(Croatia) Petra Marčinko; 6–4, 6–4	Alevtina Ibragimova	(Germany) Caroline Werner (Ukraine) Daria Snigur	Anastasia Zakharova (Czech Republic) Vendula Valdmannová; Elena Pridankina (Slovakia) Viktória Hrunčáková
November 24	Fujairah Championships; Fujairah, United Arab Emirates; Hard; W75; Singles – Doubles	(Slovakia) Viktória Hrunčáková (Czech Republic) Vendula Valdmannová; 6–4, 6–3	(Australia) Olivia Gadecki (United Kingdom) Mika Stojsavljevic	(Germany) Caroline Werner (Ukraine) Daria Snigur	Anastasia Zakharova (Czech Republic) Vendula Valdmannová; Elena Pridankina (Slovakia) Viktória Hrunčáková
November 24	Empire Women's Indoor II; Trnava, Slovakia; Hard (i); W75; Singles and doubles draws	(Romania) Elena-Gabriela Ruse; 5–7, 6–4, 6–0	(Czech Republic) Lucie Havlíčková	(Belgium) Jeline Vandromme; Aliona Falei	(Estonia) Elena Malõgina (Germany) Tamara Korpatsch (Latvia) Anastasija Sevastova (Ukraine) Anastasiia Sobolieva
November 24	Empire Women's Indoor II; Trnava, Slovakia; Hard (i); W75; Singles and doubles draws	(Czech Republic) Aneta Kučmová (Slovenia) Nika Radišić; 6–4, 6–3	(Slovakia) Katarína Kužmová (Slovakia) Nina Vargová	(Belgium) Jeline Vandromme; Aliona Falei	(Estonia) Elena Malõgina (Germany) Tamara Korpatsch (Latvia) Anastasija Sevastova (Ukraine) Anastasiia Sobolieva
November 24	Keio Challenger; Yokohama, Japan; Hard; W50; Singles and doubles draws	(China) Zhang Shuai; 6–3, 6–2	(South Korea) Ku Yeon-woo	Jana Kolodynska (Slovakia) Viktória Morvayová	(South Korea) Park So-hyun (United States) Hanna Chang (China) Ma Yexin; Darya Astakhova
November 24	Keio Challenger; Yokohama, Japan; Hard; W50; Singles and doubles draws	(China) Dang Yiming (China) You Xiaodi; 2–6, 6–3, [10–4]	(Japan) Natsumi Kawaguchi (Japan) Hayu Kinoshita	Jana Kolodynska (Slovakia) Viktória Morvayová	(South Korea) Park So-hyun (United States) Hanna Chang (China) Ma Yexin; Darya Astakhova
November 24	Internazionali Tennis Val Gardena Südtirol; Ortisei, Italy; Hard (i); W50; Singles and doubles draws	(Spain) Eva Guerrero Álvarez; 6–4, 6–4	(Canada) Kayla Cross	(United Kingdom) Mimi Xu (Portugal) Francisca Jorge	(Switzerland) Susan Bandecchi (Poland) Urszula Radwańska (Sweden) Lisa Zaar (Spain) María Martínez Vaquero
November 24	Internazionali Tennis Val Gardena Südtirol; Ortisei, Italy; Hard (i); W50; Singles and doubles draws	(Canada) Kayla Cross (United States) Anna Rogers; 7–6^{(7–4)}, 7–6^{(9–7)}	(Italy) Samira De Stefano (Italy) Gaia Maduzzi	(United Kingdom) Mimi Xu (Portugal) Francisca Jorge	(Switzerland) Susan Bandecchi (Poland) Urszula Radwańska (Sweden) Lisa Zaar (Spain) María Martínez Vaquero
November 24	Antalya, Turkey; Clay; W35; Singles and doubles draws	(Georgia (country)) Sofia Shapatava; 2–6, 7–5, 6–3	(Czech Republic) Julie Štruplová	(France) Séléna Janicijevic (Latvia) Adelina Lachinova	(Germany) Antonia Schmidt (Bulgaria) Lia Karatancheva (Sweden) Caijsa Hennemann (Australia) Melisa Ercan
November 24	Antalya, Turkey; Clay; W35; Singles and doubles draws	(United States) Elizabeth Coleman (Germany) Gina Marie Dittmann; 6–1, 6–3	(United States) Mia Horvit (Germany) Angelina Wirges	(France) Séléna Janicijevic (Latvia) Adelina Lachinova	(Germany) Antonia Schmidt (Bulgaria) Lia Karatancheva (Sweden) Caijsa Hennemann (Australia) Melisa Ercan
November 24	Monastir, Tunisia; Hard; W35; Singles and doubles draws	(United States) Carolyn Ansari; 7–6^{(7–5)}, 6–2	(United States) Kailey Evans	(Lithuania) Justina Mikulskytė (United Kingdom) Alicia Dudeney	(United Kingdom) Ranah Stoiber (Ukraine) Masha Lazarenko (Serbia) Luna Vujović; Mariia Tkacheva
November 24	Monastir, Tunisia; Hard; W35; Singles and doubles draws	(United States) Kailey Evans (United States) Jordyn McBride; 6–3, 6–2	(Italy) Anastasia Abbagnato (Bulgaria) Isabella Shinikova	(Lithuania) Justina Mikulskytė (United Kingdom) Alicia Dudeney	(United Kingdom) Ranah Stoiber (Ukraine) Masha Lazarenko (Serbia) Luna Vujović; Mariia Tkacheva
November 24	Torelló, Spain; Hard; W15; Singles and doubles draws	(Italy) Alessandra Mazzola; 6–2, 6–4	(France) Nahia Berecoechea	(Latvia) Diāna Marcinkēviča (Spain) Carmen Gallardo Guevara	(Germany) Joëlle Steur (France) Lucie Pawlak (United Kingdom) Mia Wainwright (Spain) Marta Soriano Santiago
November 24	Torelló, Spain; Hard; W15; Singles and doubles draws	(China) Liu Min (Netherlands) Demi Tran; 4–6, 6–2, [10–6]	(Spain) Paula Ortega Redondo (France) Lucie Pawlak	(Latvia) Diāna Marcinkēviča (Spain) Carmen Gallardo Guevara	(Germany) Joëlle Steur (France) Lucie Pawlak (United Kingdom) Mia Wainwright (Spain) Marta Soriano Santiago
November 24	Lousada, Portugal; Hard (i); W15; Singles and doubles draws	(Hungary) Adrienn Nagy; 6–3, 6–2	(Switzerland) Stefaniya Pushkar	(Portugal) Angelina Voloshchuk (United States) Jamilah Snells	(Netherlands) Coco Bosman (Sweden) Linea Bajraliu (Spain) Lorena Solar Donoso (Spain) Alba Rey García
November 24	Lousada, Portugal; Hard (i); W15; Singles and doubles draws	(Portugal) Ana Filipa Santos (Portugal) Angelina Voloshchuk; 6–4, 6–4	(Spain) Celia Cerviño Ruiz (Italy) Valentina Losciale	(Portugal) Angelina Voloshchuk (United States) Jamilah Snells	(Netherlands) Coco Bosman (Sweden) Linea Bajraliu (Spain) Lorena Solar Donoso (Spain) Alba Rey García
November 24	Heraklion, Greece; Clay; W15; Singles and doubles draws	(Greece) Sapfo Sakellaridi; 1–6, 6–4, 6–3	(Greece) Elena Korokozidi	(Germany) Eva Marie Voracek (Spain) Lucía Cortez Llorca	(Romania) Bianca Bărbulescu (Greece) Marianne Argyrokastriti (Spain) Sara Dols; Daria Lodikova
November 24	Heraklion, Greece; Clay; W15; Singles and doubles draws	(Greece) Sapfo Sakellaridi (Germany) Eva Marie Voracek; Walkover	(Latvia) Margarita Ignatjeva (Greece) Elena Korokozidi	(Germany) Eva Marie Voracek (Spain) Lucía Cortez Llorca	(Romania) Bianca Bărbulescu (Greece) Marianne Argyrokastriti (Spain) Sara Dols; Daria Lodikova
November 24	Sharm El Sheikh, Egypt; Hard; W15; Singles and doubles draws	Daria Khomutsianskaya; 4–6, 6–0, 6–4	(Lithuania) Andrė Lukošiūtė	Anna Pushkareva (France) Alyssa Réguer	Daria Egorova; Nina Sozaonova (China) Mi Lan (Egypt) Lamis Alhussein Abdel Aziz
November 24	Sharm El Sheikh, Egypt; Hard; W15; Singles and doubles draws	Daria Khomutsianskaya; Anna Kubareva; 6–2, 6–4	(Austria) Liel Marlies Rothensteiner (Germany) Yasmine Wagner	Anna Pushkareva (France) Alyssa Réguer	Daria Egorova; Nina Sozaonova (China) Mi Lan (Egypt) Lamis Alhussein Abdel Aziz
November 24	Ribeirão Preto, Brazil; Clay; W15; Singles and doubles draws	(Brazil) Luiza Fullana; 6–1, 6–4	(Brazil) Nauhany Vitória Leme da Silva	(Argentina) Justina María González Daniele (Switzerland) Marie Mettraux	(Brazil) Giovana Schincariol Delatorre Barbosa (Brazil) Pietra Rivoli (Argentina) Carla Markus (Brazil) Ana Candiotto
November 24	Ribeirão Preto, Brazil; Clay; W15; Singles and doubles draws	(Jamaica) Najah Dawson (Brazil) Marjorie Souza; 6–1, 6–2	(Brazil) Maria Carolina Ferreira Turchetto (United Kingdom) Vlada Kozak	(Argentina) Justina María González Daniele (Switzerland) Marie Mettraux	(Brazil) Giovana Schincariol Delatorre Barbosa (Brazil) Pietra Rivoli (Argentina) Carla Markus (Brazil) Ana Candiotto

=== December ===
Week of	Tournament	Winner	Runners-up	Semifinalists	Quarterfinalists
December 1	Al Habtoor Tennis Challenge; Dubai, United Arab Emirates; Hard; W100; Singles – Doubles	(Croatia) Petra Marčinko; 6–3, 6–3	Vera Zvonareva	(United Kingdom) Mika Stojsavljevic (China) Gao Xinyu	Sofya Lansere; Polina Iatcenko (Netherlands) Arantxa Rus; Alevtina Ibragimova
December 1	Al Habtoor Tennis Challenge; Dubai, United Arab Emirates; Hard; W100; Singles – Doubles	(China) Gao Xinyu (Thailand) Mananchaya Sawangkaew; 4–6, 7–5, [10–7]	Rada Zolotareva; Vera Zvonareva	(United Kingdom) Mika Stojsavljevic (China) Gao Xinyu	Sofya Lansere; Polina Iatcenko (Netherlands) Arantxa Rus; Alevtina Ibragimova
December 1	Sëlva Gardena, Italy; Hard (i); W50; Singles and doubles draws	(Poland) Martyna Kubka; 7–5, 6–3	(Germany) Noma Noha Akugue	(United Kingdom) Mimi Xu (Switzerland) Céline Naef	(Croatia) Jana Fett (Italy) Samira De Stefano (Netherlands) Anouck Vrancken Peeters (Italy) Lisa Pigato
December 1	Sëlva Gardena, Italy; Hard (i); W50; Singles and doubles draws	(Poland) Weronika Falkowska (Switzerland) Céline Naef; 6–4, 6–4	(Italy) Laura Mair (Italy) Lisa Peer	(United Kingdom) Mimi Xu (Switzerland) Céline Naef	(Croatia) Jana Fett (Italy) Samira De Stefano (Netherlands) Anouck Vrancken Peeters (Italy) Lisa Pigato
December 1	Sharm El Sheikh, Egypt; Hard; W35; Singles and doubles draws	(France) Julie Belgraver; 5–7, 7–6^{(7–2)}, 6–4	(Poland) Weronika Ewald	Aliona Falei (Slovakia) Viktória Morvayová	Daria Khomutsianskaya; Alexandra Shubladze (Netherlands) Stéphanie Visscher (Egypt) Sandra Samir
December 1	Sharm El Sheikh, Egypt; Hard; W35; Singles and doubles draws	Daria Egorova; Daria Khomutsianskaya; 6–4, 6–2	(France) Yara Bartashevich; Kristiana Sidorova	Aliona Falei (Slovakia) Viktória Morvayová	Daria Khomutsianskaya; Alexandra Shubladze (Netherlands) Stéphanie Visscher (Egypt) Sandra Samir
December 1	Monastir, Tunisia; Hard; W35; Singles and doubles draws	(Canada) Katherine Sebov; 6–4, 6–1	(France) Nahia Berecoechea	(Hong Kong) Adithya Karunaratne; Mariia Tkacheva	(United States) Carolyn Ansari (United States) Kailey Evans (United Kingdom) Alicia Dudeney (Switzerland) Alina Granwehr
December 1	Monastir, Tunisia; Hard; W35; Singles and doubles draws	(Canada) Ariana Arseneault (United Kingdom) Alicia Dudeney; 6–4, 6–2	(United States) Kailey Evans (United States) Jordyn McBride	(Hong Kong) Adithya Karunaratne; Mariia Tkacheva	(United States) Carolyn Ansari (United States) Kailey Evans (United Kingdom) Alicia Dudeney (Switzerland) Alina Granwehr
December 1	Daytona Beach, United States; Clay; W35; Singles and doubles draws	(United States) Vivian Wolff; 7–6^{(8–6)}, 6–3	(United States) Akasha Urhobo	(China) Xu Shilin (China) Zhang Ruien	(Bosnia and Herzegovina) Ema Burgić (Italy) Francesca Pace; Kira Matushkina (United States) Haley Giavara
December 1	Daytona Beach, United States; Clay; W35; Singles and doubles draws	(Estonia) Ingrid Neel (United States) Abigail Rencheli; 6–3, 6–2	(United States) Anastasia Goncharova (United States) Madison Tattini	(China) Xu Shilin (China) Zhang Ruien	(Bosnia and Herzegovina) Ema Burgić (Italy) Francesca Pace; Kira Matushkina (United States) Haley Giavara
December 1	Melilla, Spain; Clay; W15; Singles and doubles draws	(Spain) Aran Teixidó García; 6–4, 7–6^{(8–6)}	(Spain) Sara Dols	(Germany) Franziska Sziedat (Spain) Lucía Cortez Llorca	(Serbia) Mila Mašić (Spain) Lucía Natal (Netherlands) Demi Tran (Spain) Meritxell Teixidó García
December 1	Melilla, Spain; Clay; W15; Singles and doubles draws	(Germany) Laura Boehner (Netherlands) Demi Tran; Walkover	(Spain) Lucía Cortez Llorca (Spain) Olga Parres Azcoitia	(Germany) Franziska Sziedat (Spain) Lucía Cortez Llorca	(Serbia) Mila Mašić (Spain) Lucía Natal (Netherlands) Demi Tran (Spain) Meritxell Teixidó García
December 1	Antalya, Turkey; Clay; W15; Singles and doubles draws	(France) Océane Babel; 6–2, 6–2	(Romania) Alesia Breaz	(Bulgaria) Julia Stamatova; Felitsata Dorofeeva-Rybas	(Ukraine) Anastasiya Zaparyniuk; Anna Kartseva (Germany) Gina Marie Dittmann (Bulgaria) Alexa Karatancheva
December 1	Antalya, Turkey; Clay; W15; Singles and doubles draws	(Romania) Alesia Breaz (Romania) Cristiana Nicoleta Todoni; 6–4, 3–6, [10–7]	(Romania) Ștefania Bojică (Ukraine) Anastasiya Zaparyniuk	(Bulgaria) Julia Stamatova; Felitsata Dorofeeva-Rybas	(Ukraine) Anastasiya Zaparyniuk; Anna Kartseva (Germany) Gina Marie Dittmann (Bulgaria) Alexa Karatancheva
December 1	Lima, Peru; Clay; W15; Singles and doubles draws	(Argentina) Victoria Bosio; 7–6^{(7–5)}, 7–6^{(7–4)}	(Germany) Marie Vogt	(Switzerland) Marie Mettraux (Argentina) Luciana Moyano	(Mexico) Natalia Sousa Salazar (United States) Isabella Barrera Aguirre (United States) Maia Sung (Brazil) Ana Candiotto
December 1	Lima, Peru; Clay; W15; Singles and doubles draws	(Brazil) Ana Candiotto (Argentina) Luciana Moyano; 6–4, 6–1	(Jamaica) Najah Dawson (Brazil) Júlia Konishi Camargo Silva	(Switzerland) Marie Mettraux (Argentina) Luciana Moyano	(Mexico) Natalia Sousa Salazar (United States) Isabella Barrera Aguirre (United States) Maia Sung (Brazil) Ana Candiotto
December 8	Sharm El Sheikh, Egypt; Hard; W35; Singles and doubles draws	(United States) Hibah Shaikh; 7–5, 6–0	(United Kingdom) Katy Dunne	Daria Khomutsianskaya (France) Yara Bartashevich	(Croatia) Tara Würth (Latvia) Kamilla Bartone (Bulgaria) Rositsa Dencheva (Germany) Caroline Werner
December 8	Sharm El Sheikh, Egypt; Hard; W35; Singles and doubles draws	(United States) Savannah Broadus (United States) Hibah Shaikh; 6–4, 6–4	(France) Yara Bartashevich (Latvia) Kamilla Bartone	Daria Khomutsianskaya (France) Yara Bartashevich	(Croatia) Tara Würth (Latvia) Kamilla Bartone (Bulgaria) Rositsa Dencheva (Germany) Caroline Werner
December 8	Hamilton, New Zealand; Hard; W15; Singles and doubles draws	(Japan) Kayo Nishimura; 6–4, 6–3	(United States) India Houghton	(Australia) Stefani Webb (Australia) Sarah Rokusek	(Japan) Yuno Kitahara (China) Yuan Chengyiyi (Japan) Reina Goto (Italy) Chiara di Tommaso
December 8	Hamilton, New Zealand; Hard; W15; Singles and doubles draws	(Japan) Ayumi Miyamoto (Japan) Kisa Yoshioka; 6–1, 6–3	(Japan) Yuka Hosoki (Australia) Sarah Rokusek	(Australia) Stefani Webb (Australia) Sarah Rokusek	(Japan) Yuno Kitahara (China) Yuan Chengyiyi (Japan) Reina Goto (Italy) Chiara di Tommaso
December 8	Antalya, Turkey; Clay; W15; Singles and doubles draws	(Spain) Aran Teixidó García; 6–3, 4–6, 6–2	(Italy) Alessandra Mazzola	(France) Océane Babel (Italy) Sofia Rocchetti	(Romania) Ilinca Amariei (Turkey) İlay Yörük (Japan) Nanari Katsumi (Romania) Cristiana Nicoleta Todoni
December 8	Antalya, Turkey; Clay; W15; Singles and doubles draws	(Netherlands) Rikke de Koning (Netherlands) Madelief Hageman; 4–6, 6–4, [11–9]	(Romania) Alesia Breaz (Romania) Cristiana Nicoleta Todoni	(France) Océane Babel (Italy) Sofia Rocchetti	(Romania) Ilinca Amariei (Turkey) İlay Yörük (Japan) Nanari Katsumi (Romania) Cristiana Nicoleta Todoni
December 8	Monastir, Tunisia; Hard; W15; Singles and doubles draws	(Malta) Francesca Curmi; 7–5, 6–4	(Lithuania) Justina Mikulskytė	Anastasia Efremova (France) Nahia Berecoechea	(Canada) Ariana Arseneault (France) Yasmine Mansouri (Greece) Sapfo Sakellaridi (France) Dune Vaissaud
December 8	Monastir, Tunisia; Hard; W15; Singles and doubles draws	(China) Mi Lan (Greece) Sapfo Sakellaridi; 6–3, 6–4	(Italy) Carolina Gasparini (Italy) Lavinia Luciano	Anastasia Efremova (France) Nahia Berecoechea	(Canada) Ariana Arseneault (France) Yasmine Mansouri (Greece) Sapfo Sakellaridi (France) Dune Vaissaud
December 8	Lima, Peru; Clay; W15; Singles and doubles draws	(Peru) Lucciana Pérez Alarcón; 6–1, 3–0 ret.	(Germany) Marie Vogt	(Chile) Fernanda Labraña (Italy) Martina Colmegna	(Canada) Isabella Marton (Brazil) Luiza Fullana (United States) Aoife Kuo (Jamaica) Najah Dawson
December 8	Lima, Peru; Clay; W15; Singles and doubles draws	(Argentina) Luciana Moyano (Ecuador) Camila Romero; 4–6, 6–4, [10–6]	(Switzerland) Marie Mettraux (Germany) Marie Vogt	(Chile) Fernanda Labraña (Italy) Martina Colmegna	(Canada) Isabella Marton (Brazil) Luiza Fullana (United States) Aoife Kuo (Jamaica) Najah Dawson
December 15	Tauranga, New Zealand; Hard; W35; Singles and doubles draws	(Australia) Tahlia Kokkinis; 6–3, 1–0 ret.	(Japan) Mio Mushika	(Hong Kong) Shek Cheuk-ying (Japan) Reina Goto	(Australia) Catherine Aulia (Japan) Kayo Nishimura (China) Shao Yushan (Japan) Yuno Kitahara
December 15	Tauranga, New Zealand; Hard; W35; Singles and doubles draws	(Japan) Ayumi Miyamoto (Japan) Kisa Yoshioka; 6–4, 6–2	(United States) India Houghton (New Zealand) Elyse Tse	(Hong Kong) Shek Cheuk-ying (Japan) Reina Goto	(Australia) Catherine Aulia (Japan) Kayo Nishimura (China) Shao Yushan (Japan) Yuno Kitahara
December 15	New Delhi, India; Hard; W35; Singles and doubles draws	(South Korea) Park So-hyun; 6–3, 6–3	(France) Ksenia Efremova	Mariia Tkacheva (India) Shruti Ahlawat	Maria Golovina (India) Vaidehi Chaudhari (Kazakhstan) Aruzhan Sagandykova (Slovakia) Viktória Morvayová
December 15	New Delhi, India; Hard; W35; Singles and doubles draws	(Japan) Hiroko Kuwata; Ekaterina Yashina; 6–2, 6–3	(India) Vaidehi Chaudhari (India) Zeel Desai	Mariia Tkacheva (India) Shruti Ahlawat	Maria Golovina (India) Vaidehi Chaudhari (Kazakhstan) Aruzhan Sagandykova (Slovakia) Viktória Morvayová
December 15	Antalya, Turkey; Clay; W15; Singles and doubles draws	(Spain) Sara Dols; 6–2, 6–3	Anna Snigireva	(Netherlands) Rikke de Koning (Spain) Aran Teixidó García	(Japan) Nanari Katsumi (United Kingdom) Melissa Boyden (Romania) Maria Sara Popa (Japan) Rinko Matsuda
December 15	Antalya, Turkey; Clay; W15; Singles and doubles draws	(Kazakhstan) Asylzhan Arystanbekova (Kazakhstan) Ingkar Dyussebay; 5–7, 6–4, [11–9]	(Armenia) Ani Amiraghyan (Turkey) Ada Kumru	(Netherlands) Rikke de Koning (Spain) Aran Teixidó García	(Japan) Nanari Katsumi (United Kingdom) Melissa Boyden (Romania) Maria Sara Popa (Japan) Rinko Matsuda
December 15	Monastir, Tunisia; Hard; W15; Singles and doubles draws	(Greece) Sapfo Sakellaridi; 7–5, 6–2	(France) Yasmine Mansouri	(Romania) Maia Ilinca Burcescu (Kosovo) Arlinda Rushiti	(Egypt) Yasmin Ezzat (Netherlands) Charlotte Pikkaart (Serbia) Petra Konjikušić (Spain) Victoria Gómez O'Hayon
December 15	Monastir, Tunisia; Hard; W15; Singles and doubles draws	(China) Mi Lan (Greece) Sapfo Sakellaridi; 6–2, 6–2	Arina Arifullina (Egypt) Yasmin Ezzat	(Romania) Maia Ilinca Burcescu (Kosovo) Arlinda Rushiti	(Egypt) Yasmin Ezzat (Netherlands) Charlotte Pikkaart (Serbia) Petra Konjikušić (Spain) Victoria Gómez O'Hayon
December 15	Lima, Peru; Clay; W15; Singles and doubles draws	(Germany) Marie Vogt; 3–6, 6–2, 6–3	(Switzerland) Marie Mettraux	(Argentina) Victoria Bosio (Brazil) Ana Candiotto	(Colombia) Yuliana Lizarazo (United States) Misa Malkin (Argentina) Luciana Moyano (Peru) Yleymi Muelle Valdez
December 15	Lima, Peru; Clay; W15; Singles and doubles draws	(Argentina) Luciana Moyano (Ecuador) Camila Romero; 6–2, 6–7^{(6–8)}, [11–9]	(Brazil) Júlia Konishi Camargo Silva (Chile) Fernanda Labraña	(Argentina) Victoria Bosio (Brazil) Ana Candiotto	(Colombia) Yuliana Lizarazo (United States) Misa Malkin (Argentina) Luciana Moyano (Peru) Yleymi Muelle Valdez
December 22	Solapur, India; Hard; W35; Singles and doubles draws	(India) Vaidehi Chaudhari; 3–6, 6–3, 6–4	(Japan) Michika Ozeki	(India) Vaishnavi Adkar (India) Shrivalli Bhamidipaty	Maria Golovina (France) Ksenia Efremova (Japan) Honoka Kobayashi (India) Maaya Rajeshwaran
December 22	Solapur, India; Hard; W35; Singles and doubles draws	(India) Vaishnavi Adkar (India) Ankita Raina; 4–6, 7–5, [10–6]	(India) Zeel Desai; Elina Nepliy	(India) Vaishnavi Adkar (India) Shrivalli Bhamidipaty	Maria Golovina (France) Ksenia Efremova (Japan) Honoka Kobayashi (India) Maaya Rajeshwaran
December 22	Antalya, Turkey; Clay; W15; Singles and doubles draws	(Romania) Maria Sara Popa; 1–0 ret.	(Romania) Sara Victoria Bălan	(Kazakhstan) Asylzhan Arystanbekova (Spain) Sara Dols	(Morocco) Diae El Jardi (China) Xu Jiayu (Spain) Meritxell Teixidó García (Germany) Emily Victoria Eigelsbach
December 22	Antalya, Turkey; Clay; W15; Singles and doubles draws	(Morocco) Diae El Jardi (Romania) Maria Sara Popa; 6–4, 3–6, [13–11]	(Iran) Meshkatolzahra Safi (China) Xu Jiayu	(Kazakhstan) Asylzhan Arystanbekova (Spain) Sara Dols	(Morocco) Diae El Jardi (China) Xu Jiayu (Spain) Meritxell Teixidó García (Germany) Emily Victoria Eigelsbach
December 22	Monastir, Tunisia; Hard; W15; Singles and doubles draws	(Greece) Sapfo Sakellaridi; 4–6, 6–4, 6–3	(Switzerland) Chelsea Fontenel	(China) Mi Lan (Serbia) Petra Konjikušić	(Egypt) Yasmin Ezzat (Japan) Ran Wakana; Arina Arifullina (Germany) Anna Petkovic
December 22	Monastir, Tunisia; Hard; W15; Singles and doubles draws	(China) Mi Lan (Greece) Sapfo Sakellaridi; 6–1, 6–0	(Turkey) İrem Kurt (Romania) Maria Toma	(China) Mi Lan (Serbia) Petra Konjikušić	(Egypt) Yasmin Ezzat (Japan) Ran Wakana; Arina Arifullina (Germany) Anna Petkovic
December 29	Nairobi, Kenya; Clay; W35; Singles and doubles draws	(Kenya) Angella Okutoyi; 6–3, 3–6, 6–3	(Italy) Martina Colmegna	(Poland) Zuzanna Pawlikowska (France) Alyssa Réguer	(Serbia) Natalija Senić (Germany) Anastasiya Kuparev (Egypt) Lamis Alhussein Abdel Aziz (China) Ren Yufei
December 29	Nairobi, Kenya; Clay; W35; Singles and doubles draws	(Kenya) Angella Okutoyi (Poland) Zuzanna Pawlikowska; 6–2, 7–5	(France) Alyssa Réguer (China) Ren Yufei	(Poland) Zuzanna Pawlikowska (France) Alyssa Réguer	(Serbia) Natalija Senić (Germany) Anastasiya Kuparev (Egypt) Lamis Alhussein Abdel Aziz (China) Ren Yufei
December 29	Ahmedabad, India; Hard; W15; Singles and doubles draws	Maria Golovina; 6–2, 6–2	(India) Vaidehi Chaudhari	Ekaterina Yashina (Japan) Mana Kawamura	(India) Parthsarthi Arun Mundhe; Maria Kalyakina (Thailand) Tanuchaporn Yongmod (Japan) Honoka Kobayashi
December 29	Ahmedabad, India; Hard; W15; Singles and doubles draws	Maria Golovina (Kazakhstan) Aruzhan Sagandykova; 6–3, 6–2	(Japan) Mana Kawamura (Japan) Honoka Kobayashi	Ekaterina Yashina (Japan) Mana Kawamura	(India) Parthsarthi Arun Mundhe; Maria Kalyakina (Thailand) Tanuchaporn Yongmod (Japan) Honoka Kobayashi
December 29	Monastir, Tunisia; Hard; W15; Singles and doubles draws	(China) Mi Lan; 6–3, 6–0	(Germany) Johanna Silva	(Romania) Maria Toma (Egypt) Yasmin Ezzat	(Switzerland) Chelsea Fontenel (China) Chen Yiru (China) Tian Jialin (France) Marie Villet
December 29	Monastir, Tunisia; Hard; W15; Singles and doubles draws	(Japan) Yuno Kitahara (Japan) Erika Sema; 6–1, 6–3	(Romania) Maria Toma (France) Marie Villet	(Romania) Maria Toma (Egypt) Yasmin Ezzat	(Switzerland) Chelsea Fontenel (China) Chen Yiru (China) Tian Jialin (France) Marie Villet
