= 2025 Internationaux Féminins de la Vienne – Doubles =

Doubles
- 2025 Internationaux Féminins de la Vienne

Final
- Champions: (Czech Republic) Anna Sisková (Czech Republic) Vendula Valdmannová
- Runners-up: (Poland) Anna Hertel (France) Tiphanie Lemaître
- Score: 6–1, 6–4

Events
Singles	Doubles
← 2024 ·	Internationaux Féminins de la Vienne	· 2026 →

Anna-Lena Friedsam and Céline Naef were the defending champions but both chose to participate in Rovereto instead.

Anna Sisková and Vendula Valdmannová won the title, after defeating Anna Hertel and Tiphanie Lemaître in the final; 6–1, 6–4.

== Seeds ==
1. (Czech Republic) Anna Sisková / (Czech Republic) Vendula Valdmannová (champions)
2. (Poland) Anna Hertel / (France) Tiphanie Lemaître (final)
3. (France) Astrid Cirotte / (France) Marie Mattel (quarterfinals)
4. (Poland) Weronika Ewald / (Ukraine) Veronika Podrez (semifinals)

== Draw ==
=== Key ===
- Q = Qualifier
- WC = Wild card
- LL = Lucky loser
- Alt = Alternate
- ITF = ITF entry
- PR = Protected ranking
- SR = Special ranking
- SE = Special exempt
- JE = Junior exempt
- JR = Junior Accelerator Programme entrant
- CO = College Accelerator Programme entrant
- NG = Next Gen Accelerator Program entrant
- w/o = Walkover
- r = Retired
- d = Defaulted

=== Draw ===
First round
1	(Czech Republic) A Sisková (Czech Republic) V Valdmannová	6	4	[10]
(France) M Lollia (France) A Robbe	0	6	[6]
WC	(France) O Boullay (South Africa) J van Zyl	7^{7}	7^{7}
(France) Y Bartashevich (France) M Partaud	6^{4}	6^{0}
4	(Poland) W Ewald (Ukraine) V Podrez	6	7
(France) A Monnot (France) L Nguyen Tan	3	5
WC	(France) S Figasso; O Stoianova	0	0
(Ukraine) A Firman (Italy) M Giordano	6	6
(France) H Bougouffa (France) G Kalamaris	3	3
(France) D Martynov (France) M Villet	6	6
(Netherlands) C Bosman (Netherlands) K Veldman	6	0	[8]
3	(France) A Cirotte (France) M Mattel	3	6	[10]
(Belgium) F Fedeli (France) M Keita	5	3
(Czech Republic) L Petruzelová (Netherlands) E van Poppel	7	6
WC	(France) V De Samucewicz (France) L Tremellat	2	5
2	(Poland) A Hertel (France) T Lemaître	6	7

Quarterfinals
1	(Czech Republic) A Sisková (Czech Republic) V Valdmannová	6	6
WC	(France) O Boullay (South Africa) J van Zyl	3	3
4	(Poland) W Ewald (Ukraine) V Podrez	6	6
(Ukraine) A Firman (Italy) M Giordano	4	3
(France) D Martynov (France) M Villet	6	6^{1}	[11]
3	(France) A Cirotte (France) M Mattel	4	7^{7}	[9]
(Czech Republic) L Petruzelová (Netherlands) E van Poppel
2	(Poland) A Hertel (France) T Lemaître	w/o

Semifinals
1	(Czech Republic) A Sisková (Czech Republic) V Valdmannová	6	6
4	(Poland) W Ewald (Ukraine) V Podrez	2	3
(France) D Martynov (France) M Villet	6^{5}	6	[5]
2	(Poland) A Hertel (France) T Lemaître	7^{7}	3	[10]

Final
1	(Czech Republic) A Sisková (Czech Republic) V Valdmannová	6	6
2	(Poland) A Hertel (France) T Lemaître	1	4
