= 2025 Internationaux Féminins de la Vienne – Singles =

Singles
- 2025 Internationaux Féminins de la Vienne

Final
- Champion: (Ukraine) Veronika Podrez
- Runner-up: (Portugal) Francisca Jorge
- Score: 7–5, 2–6, 6–4

Events
Singles	Doubles
← 2024 ·	Internationaux Féminins de la Vienne	· 2026 →

Léolia Jeanjean was the defending champion, but chose to compete in Guangzhou instead.

Veronika Podrez won the title, after defeating Francisca Jorge in the final, 7–5, 2–6, 6–4.

== Seeds ==
1. (United States) Clervie Ngounoue (semifinals)
2. (Portugal) Matilde Jorge (first round)
3. (Portugal) Francisca Jorge (final)
4. (Serbia) Mia Ristić (second round)
5. (Czech Republic) Anna Sisková (quarterfinals)
6. (France) Amandine Hesse (quarterfinals, withdrew)
7. (Turkey) Çağla Büyükakçay (semifinals)
8. (France) Margaux Rouvroy (second round)

== Draw ==
Key

- Q = Qualifier
- WC = Wild card
- LL = Lucky loser
- Alt = Alternate
- ITF = ITF entry
- PR = Protected ranking
- SR = Special ranking
- SE = Special exempt
- JE = Junior exempt
- JR = Junior Accelerator Programme entrant
- CO = College Accelerator Programme entrant
- NG = Next Gen Accelerator Program entrant
- w/o = Walkover
- r = Retired
- d = Defaulted

=== Finals ===
Semifinals
1	(United States) Clervie Ngounoue	7^{7}	5	3
(Ukraine) Veronika Podrez	6^{2}	7	6
3	(Portugal) Francisca Jorge	6	6
7	(Turkey) Çağla Büyükakçay	1	2

Final
(Ukraine) Veronika Podrez	7	2	6
3	(Portugal) Francisca Jorge	5	6	4

=== Top half ===
First round
1	(United States) C Ngounoue	6	6
WC	(France) M Partaud	1	4
(France) S Cakarevic	6	6
WC	(France) O Boullay	3	3
(France) M Lollia	6	6
Q	(Netherlands) C Bosman	3	1
Q	(France) L Nguyen Tan	3	0
5	(Czech Republic) A Sisková	6	6
4	(Serbia) M Ristić	6	5	6
Q	(France) H Stevic	3	7	3
(Ukraine) V Podrez	6	6
WC	(France) S Baslilar	1	2
(Czech Republic) V Valdmannová	6	6
Q	(France) P Dore	1	2
(France) J Lim	1	6	2
8	(France) M Rouvroy	6	3	6

Second round
1	(United States) C Ngounoue	6	6
(France) S Cakarevic	3	2
(France) M Lollia	2	3
5	(Czech Republic) A Sisková	6	6
4	(Serbia) M Ristić	4	6	5
(Ukraine) V Podrez	6	3	7
(Czech Republic) V Valdmannová	1	6	6
8	(France) M Rouvroy	6	4	4

Quarterfinals
1	(United States) C Ngounoue	6^{4}	7^{8}	6
5	(Czech Republic) A Sisková	7^{7}	6^{6}	2
(Ukraine) V Podrez	6	6
(Czech Republic) V Valdmannová	4	4

Semifinals
1	(United States) C Ngounoue	7^{7}	5	3
(Ukraine) V Podrez	6^{6}	7	6

=== Bottom half ===
First round
6	(France) A Hesse	6	3	6
Q	(France) A Robbe	3	6	2
(France) A Monnot	6	6
(Poland) W Ewald	3	4
(France) O Dodin	4	4
WC	(France) N Berecoechea	6	6
(Poland) A Hertel	3	5
3	(Portugal) F Jorge	6	7
7	(Turkey) Ç Büyükakçay	6	2
(France) T Lemaître	2	0^{r}
(France) Y Bartashevich	7	6
Q	(Netherlands) K Veldman	5	1
Q	(France) M Szostak	6	3	6^{2}
(France) D Martynov	2	6	7^{7}
Q	(Ukraine) A Firman	6	7^{7}
2	(Portugal) M Jorge	2	6^{4}

Second round
6	(France) A Hesse	6	6
(France) A Monnot	4	3
WC	(France) N Berecoechea	3	7	5
3	(Portugal) F Jorge	6	5	7
7	(Turkey) Ç Büyükakçay	6	4	6
(France) Y Bartashevich	4	6	3
(France) D Martynov	6	6
Q	(Ukraine) A Firman	4	1

Quarterfinals
6	(France) A Hesse
3	(Portugal) F Jorge	w/o
7	(Turkey) Ç Büyükakçay	6	6
(France) D Martynov	4	2

Semifinals
3	(Portugal) F Jorge	6	6
7	(Turkey) Ç Büyükakçay	1	2
