= Eleejah Inisan =

French tennis player (born 2008)

- Country (sports): France
- Born: 6 July 2008 (age 18) Brittany, France
- Prize money: $82,355

Singles
- Career record: 61–48
- Career titles: 1 ITF
- Highest ranking: No. 591 (6 April 2026)
- Current ranking: No. 713 (22 July 2026)

Grand Slam singles results
- Australian Open Junior: 1R (2025)
- French Open Junior: 2R (2026)

Doubles
- Career record: 11–16
- Career titles: 0
- Highest ranking: No. 953 (22 July 2024)
- Current ranking: No. 1,013 (27 July 2026)

Grand Slam doubles results
- French Open: 1R (2026)
- Last updated on: 30 July 2026.

Eleejah Inisan (born 6 July 2008) is a French tennis player. She has a career-high singles ranking by the WTA of No. 591, achieved on 6 April 2026, and a best doubles ranking of No. 953, reached on 22 July 2024.

Eleejah was born in Brittany, France in 2008. She trains at the National Training Center at Roland Garros. She won 2022 in the 13/14 age group and 2023 in the 15/16 age group the French national championships.

In May 2026, she received a wildcard into the 2026 French Open doubles tournament with her partner Ksenia Efremova.

== ITF Circuit finals ==
=== Singles: 2 (1 title, 1 runner-up) ===
Legend W15 tournaments (1–1)	Finals by surface Hard (1–1)

Result	W–L	Date	Tournament	Tier	Surface	Opponent	Score
Win	1–0	Oct 2025	ITF Monastir, Tunisia	W15	Hard	(Japan) Kayo Nishimura	6–1, 6–2
Loss	1–1	Nov 2025	ITF Phan Thiết, Vietnam	W15	Hard	(China) Wang Jiaqi	0–6, 4–6

=== Doubles: 1 (runner-up) ===
Legend W15 tournaments (0–1)	Finals by surface Clay (0–1)

Result	W–L	Date	Tournament	Tier	Surface	Partner	Opponents	Score
Loss	0–1	Jul 2026	ITF Krško, Slovenia	W15	Clay	(Netherlands) Rose Marie Nijkamp	(Czech Republic) Veronika Kulhavá (Italy) Federica Trevisan	3–6, 1–6
