= 2025 Internationaux Féminins de la Vienne =

Tennis tournament

- Date: 20–26 October 2025
- Edition: 31st
- Category: ITF Women's World Tennis Tour
- Prize money: $60,000
- Surface: Hard / Indoor
- Location: Poitiers, France

Champions

Singles
- (Ukraine) Veronika Podrez

Doubles
- (Czech Republic) Anna Sisková / (Czech Republic) Vendula Valdmannová
| ← 2024 · | Internationaux Féminins de la Vienne | · 2026 → |

The 2025 Internationaux Féminins de la Vienne is a professional tennis tournament played on indoor hard courts. It was the thirty-first edition of the tournament which was part of the 2025 ITF Women's World Tennis Tour. It took place in Poitiers, France between 20 and 26 October 2025.

== Champions ==
=== Singles ===
- (Ukraine) Veronika Podrez def. (Portugal) Francisca Jorge, 7–5, 2–6, 6–4

=== Doubles ===
- (Czech Republic) Anna Sisková / (Czech Republic) Vendula Valdmannová def. (Poland) Anna Hertel / (France) Tiphanie Lemaître, 6–1, 6–4

== Singles main draw entrants ==
=== Seeds ===
| Country | Player | Rank^{1} | Seed |
|---|---|---|---|
| USA | Clervie Ngounoue | 179 | 1 |
| POR | Matilde Jorge | 250 | 2 |
| POR | Francisca Jorge | 255 | 3 |
| SRB | Mia Ristić | 270 | 4 |
| CZE | Anna Sisková | 300 | 5 |
| FRA | Amandine Hesse | 309 | 6 |
| TUR | Çağla Büyükakçay | 318 | 7 |
| FRA | Margaux Rouvroy | 334 | 8 |

- ^{1} Rankings are as of 13 October 2025.

=== Other entrants ===
The following players received wildcards into the singles main draw:

- (France) Seda Baslilar
- (France) Nahia Berecoechea
- (France) Ophélie Boullay
- (France) Marine Partaud

The following players received entry from the qualifying draw:

- (Netherlands) Coco Bosman
- (France) Pauline Dore
- (Ukraine) Anastasiia Firman
- (France) Lucie Nguyen Tan
- (France) Alice Robbe
- (France) Helena Stevic
- (France) Marine Szostak
- (Netherlands) Klara Veldman
