= ITF Fujairah Championships =

ITF Women's Tour
- Event name: ITF Fujairah Championships
- Location: Fujairah, United Arab Emirates
- Venue: Fujairah Tennis & Country Club
- Category: ITF Women's Circuit
- Surface: Hard
- Draw: 32S/32Q/16D
- Prize money: $100,000

The ITF Fujairah Championships is a tournament for professional female tennis players played on outdoor Hard courts. The event is classified as a $60,000 ITF Women's Circuit tournament and has been held in Fujairah, United Arab Emirates, since 2025. Since 2026 the tournament prize money increased to $100,000 and the tournament date changed to end of January.

== Past finals ==
=== Singles ===
Year	Champion	Runner-up	Score
2026	(Austria) Lilli Tagger	(United Kingdom) Harriet Dart	6–4, 6–2
2025	(Croatia) Petra Marčinko	Alevtina Ibragimova	6–4, 6–4

=== Doubles ===
Year	Champions	Runners-up	Score
2026	(United Kingdom) Harriet Dart (United Kingdom) Maia Lumsden	(Netherlands) Isabelle Haverlag; Elena Pridankina	6–1, 6–0
2025	(Slovakia) Viktória Hrunčáková (Czech Republic) Vendula Valdmannová	(Australia) Olivia Gadecki (United Kingdom) Mika Stojsavljevic	6–4, 6–3
