= Veronika Podrez =

Ukrainian tennis player (born 2007)

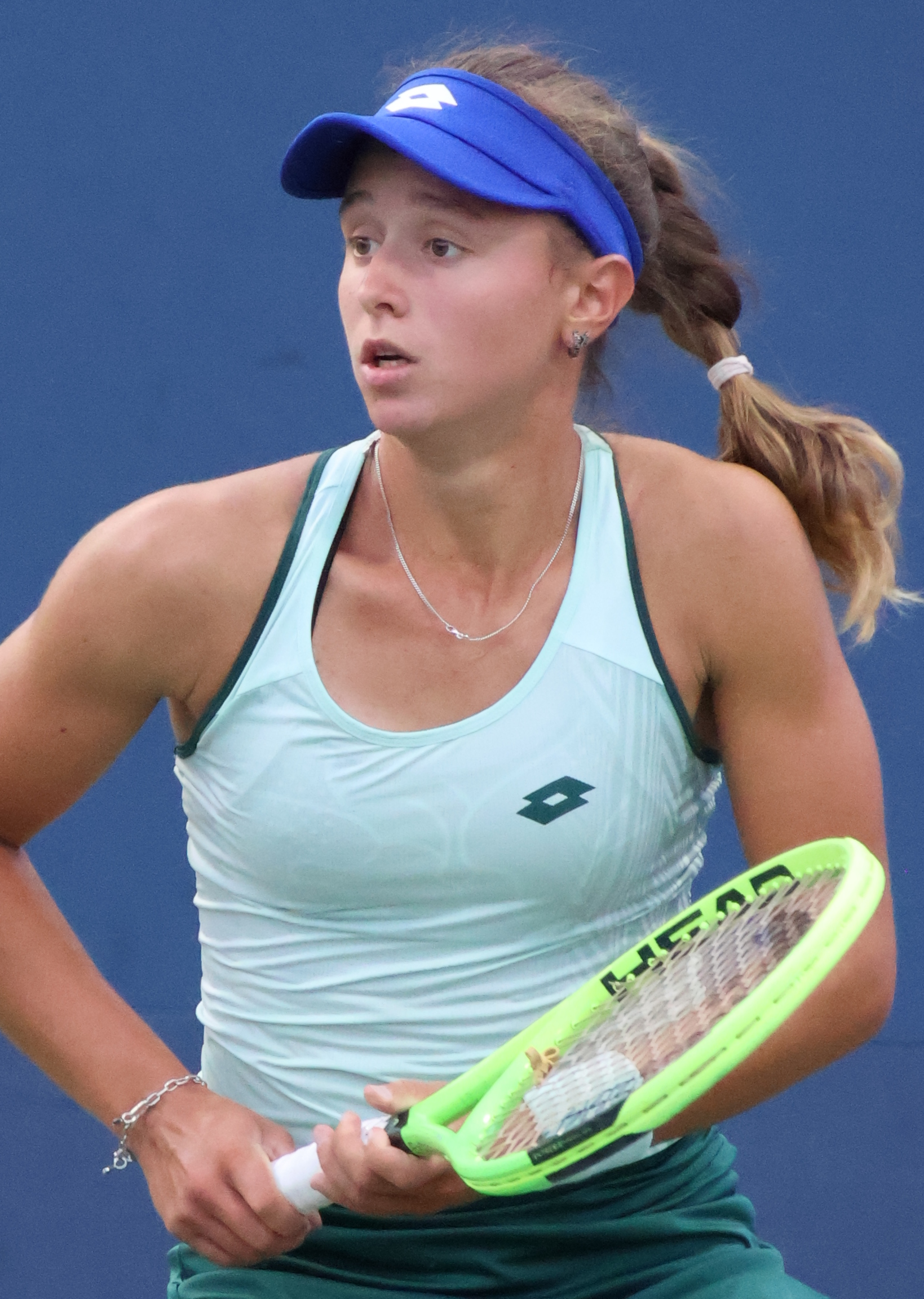
- Podrez at the 2026 US Open
- Country (sports): Ukraine
- Residence: France
- Born: 11 January 2007 (age 19) Nova Kakhovka, Ukraine
- Plays: Right-handed
- Prize money: $235,897

Singles
- Career record: 179–82
- Career titles: 10 ITF
- Highest ranking: No. 120 (16 November 2026)

Grand Slam singles results
- French Open: Q1 (2026)
- Wimbledon: Q2 (2026)
- US Open: Q2 (2026)

Doubles
- Career record: 26–33
- Career titles: 1 ITF
- Highest ranking: No. 347 (21 September 2026)
- Current ranking: No. 390 (16 November 2026)
- Last updated on: 10 October 2026.

Veronika Podrez (Ukrainian: Вероніка Василівна Подрез; born 11 January 2007) is a Ukrainian tennis player. She has a career-high singles ranking of world No. 120 by the WTA, achieved on 16 November 2026, and a best doubles ranking of No. 347, achieved 21 September 2026.

== Career ==
Podrez won her first W75 title at Poitiers in the singles draw.

Ranked at world No. 209, she qualified to make her WTA Tour main-draw debut at the 2026 Open de Rouen and defeated wildcard entrant Sloane Stephens in the first round. Podrez then overcame seventh seed Elisabetta Cocciaretto in three sets for her first win against a top-50 ranked player and to reach the quarterfinals. Next she defeated Katie Boulter in straight sets to make it into the semifinals. Podrez then advanced to the final via walkover when her scheduled last four opponent, second seed Sorana Cirstea, withdrew before their match due to a leg injury. She lost the championship match to top seed Marta Kostyuk in straight sets, in what was the first WTA Tour final contested by two Ukrainian players. As a result of her performance at the tournament, Podrez broke into the top-150 in the WTA rankings for the first time on 20 April 2026, reaching world No. 147.

== Personal life ==
Podrez was born in Nova Kakhovka, Kherson Oblast, but has lived with her parents in France since 2012.

== WTA Tour finals ==
=== Singles: 1 (runner-up) ===
Legend WTA 250 (0–1)	Finals by surface Clay (0–1)	Finals by setting Indoor (0–1)

Result	W–L	Date	Tournament	Tier	Surface	Opponent	Score
Loss	0–1	Apr 2026	Open de Rouen, France	WTA 250	Clay (i)	(Ukraine) Marta Kostyuk	3–6, 4–6

== ITF Circuit finals ==
=== Singles: 14 (10 titles, 4 runner-ups) ===
Legend W75 tournaments (3–1) W25/35 tournaments (2–1) W15 tournaments (5–2)	Finals by surface Clay (3–2) Hard (7–2)

Result	W–L	Date	Tournament	Tier	Surface	Opponent	Score
Win	1–0	Aug 2023	ITF Wanfercée-Baulet, Belgium	W15	Clay	(Netherlands) Judith Visscher	4–6, 6–4, 6–4
Win	2–0	Oct 2023	ITF Cherbourg-en-Cotentin, France	W25	Hard (i)	(France) Alice Robbe	6–4, 2–6, 6–4
Win	3–0	Jan 2024	ITF Esch-sur-Alzette, Luxembourg	W15	Hard (i)	(Germany) Carolina Kuhl	6–4, 6–3
Loss	3–1	May 2024	ITF Nova Gorica, Slovenia	W15	Clay	(Brazil) Gabriela Cé	6–7^{(4–7)}, 5–7
Win	4–1	Sep 2024	ITF Dinard, France	W15	Clay	(France) Mathilde Lollia	6–1, 6–1
Loss	4–2	Sep 2024	ITF Dijon, France	W15	Clay	(Germany) Fabienne Gettwart	4–6, 1–6
Win	5–2	Mar 2025	ITF Hagetmau, France	W15	Hard (i)	(France) Alice Robbe	6–4, 6–2
Win	6–2	Mar 2025	ITF Le Havre, France	W15	Clay (i)	(France) Mathilde Lollia	6–1, 6–1
Loss	6–3	Sep 2025	ITF Reims, France	W35	Hard (i)	Alexandra Shubladze	4–6, 4–6
Win	7–3	Oct 2025	ITF Poitiers, France	W75	Hard (i)	(Portugal) Francisca Jorge	7–5, 2–6, 6–4
Loss	7–4	Feb 2026	ITF Andrézieux-Bouthéon, France	W75	Hard (i)	Julia Avdeeva	3–6, 5–7
Win	8–4	Feb 2026	ITF The Hague, Netherlands	W35	Hard (i)	(Belgium) Clara Vlasselaer	6–3, 6–3
Win	9–4	Oct 2026	ITF Poitiers, France	W75	Hard (i)	(France) Océane Dodin	6–3, 7–5
Win	10–4	Nov 2026	ITF Pétange, Luxembourg	W75	Hard (i)	(Czech Republic) Anna Sisková	6–2, 7–5

=== Doubles: 3 (1 title, 2 runner-ups) ===
Legend W50 tournaments (1–1) W35 tournaments (0–1)	Finals by surface Hard (1–2)

Result	W–L	Date	Location	Tier	Surface	Partner	Opponents	Score
Loss	0–1	Jan 2025	ITF Esch-sur-Alzette, Luxembourg	W35	Hard (i)	(France) Marine Szostak	(Czech Republic) Aneta Kučmová (Czech Republic) Aneta Laboutková	3–6, 2–6
Win	1–1	Feb 2026	Grenoble Open, France	W50	Hard (i)	(France) Tiphanie Lemaître	(Netherlands) Demi Tran (Netherlands) Lian Tran	6–3, 6–2
Loss	1–2	Mar 2026	Open Nantes Atlantique, France	W50	Hard (i)	(France) Tiphanie Lemaître	Elena Pridankina; Kira Pavlova	4–6, 3–6
