= 2025 ITF Fujairah Championships =

Tennis tournament

- Date: 24–30 November 2025
- Edition: 1st
- Category: ITF Women's World Tennis Tour
- Prize money: $60,000
- Surface: Hard / Outdoor
- Location: Fujairah, United Arab Emirates

Champions

Singles
- (Croatia) Petra Marčinko

Doubles
- (Slovakia) Viktória Hrunčáková / (Czech Republic) Vendula Valdmannová
- ITF Fujairah Championships

The 2025 ITF Fujairah Championships is a professional tennis tournament played on outdoor hard courts. It is the first edition of the tournament which is part of the 2025 ITF Women's World Tennis Tour. It took place in Fujairah, United Arab Emirates between 24 and 30 November 2025.

== Champions ==
=== Singles ===
- (Croatia) Petra Marčinko def. Alevtina Ibragimova, 6–4, 6–4.

=== Doubles ===
- (Slovakia) Viktória Hrunčáková / (Czech Republic) Vendula Valdmannová def. (Australia) Olivia Gadecki / (United Kingdom) Mika Stojsavljevic, 6–4, 6–3.

== Singles main draw entrants ==
=== Seeds ===
Country	Player	Rank^{1}	Seed
	Anastasia Zakharova	101	1
AUT	Sinja Kraus	105	2
CRO	Petra Marčinko	116	3
NED	Arantxa Rus	139	4
UKR	Daria Snigur	159	5
	Polina Iatcenko	166	6
	Elena Pridankina	201	7
AUS	Arina Rodionova	208	8

- ^{1} Rankings are as of 17 November 2025.

=== Other entrants ===
The following players received wildcards into the singles main draw:

- (Romania) Ștefania Bojică
- Alina Yuneva

The following players received entry from the qualifying draw:

- (Poland) Gina Feistel
- (Israel) Lina Glushko
- Alevtina Ibragimova
- (Turkey) İpek Öz
- (Poland) Marcelina Podlińska
- (Romania) Briana Szabó
- Daria Zelinskaya
- Rada Zolotareva

The following player received entry as a lucky loser:

- Ksenia Zaytseva

== Doubles draw ==
Viktória Hrunčáková and Vendula Valdmannová won the doubles title, defeating Olivia Gadecki and Mika Stojsavljevic in the final; 6–4, 6–3.

=== Seeds ===
1. (United Kingdom) Emily Appleton / (India) Prarthana Thombare (semifinals)
2. (India) Rutuja Bhosale / (United Kingdom) Freya Christie (first round)
3. Ekaterina Ovcharenko / (United Kingdom) Emily Webley-Smith (semifinals)
4. Elena Pridankina / Ekaterina Yashina (first round)

=== Draw ===
Key

- Q = Qualifier
- WC = Wild card
- LL = Lucky loser
- Alt = Alternate
- ITF = ITF entry
- PR = Protected ranking
- SR = Special ranking
- SE = Special exempt
- JE = Junior exempt
- JR = Junior Accelerator Programme entrant
- CO = College Accelerator Programme entrant
- NG = Next Gen Accelerator Program entrant
- w/o = Walkover
- r = Retired
- d = Defaulted

==== Draw ====
First round
1	(United Kingdom) E Appleton (India) P Thombare	7	6
WC	(Poland) G Feistel (Poland) M Podlińska	5	1
WC	A Shubladze; R Zolotareva	6	6
(Romania) Ș Bojică (Romania) B Szabó	2	1
4	E Pridankina; E Yashina	5	5
(Slovenia) D Jakupović (Turkey) İ Öz	7	7
(Australia) O Gadecki (United Kingdom) M Stojsavljevic	6	6
WC	(India) S Bhamidipaty; A Yuneva	3	1
V Panshina; D Zelinskaya	4	6	[10]
(Spain) G García Pérez (Switzerland) V Ryser	6	2	[2]
(India) A Raina (Germany) C Werner	2	4
3	E Ovcharenko (United Kingdom) E Webley-Smith	6	6
A Ibragimova; K Zaytseva	2	2
(Germany) A Fomina-Klotz (Serbia) A Krunić	6	6
(Slovakia) V Hrunčáková (Czech Republic) V Valdmannová	7	7
2	(India) R Bhosale (United Kingdom) F Christie	5	5

Quarterfinals
1	(United Kingdom) E Appleton (India) P Thombare	6	6
WC	A Shubladze; R Zolotareva	2	1
(Slovenia) D Jakupović (Turkey) İ Öz	5	0
(Australia) O Gadecki (United Kingdom) M Stojsavljevic	7	6
V Panshina; D Zelinskaya	6	5	[9]
3	E Ovcharenko (United Kingdom) E Webley-Smith	1	7	[11]
(Germany) A Fomina-Klotz (Serbia) A Krunić	3	7^{8}	[6]
(Slovakia) V Hrunčáková (Czech Republic) V Valdmannová	6	6^{6}	[10]

Semifinals
1	(United Kingdom) E Appleton (India) P Thombare	0	3
(Australia) O Gadecki (United Kingdom) M Stojsavljevic	6	6
3	E Ovcharenko (United Kingdom) E Webley-Smith	2	4
(Slovakia) V Hrunčáková (Czech Republic) V Valdmannová	6	6

Final
(Australia) O Gadecki (United Kingdom) M Stojsavljevic	4	3
(Slovakia) V Hrunčáková (Czech Republic) V Valdmannová	6	6
