= 2025 ITF Fujairah Championships – Singles =

Singles
- 2025 ITF Fujairah Championships

Final
- Champion: (Croatia) Petra Marčinko
- Runner-up: Alevtina Ibragimova
- Score: 6–4, 6–4

Events
Singles	Doubles
- ITF Fujairah Championships

This was the first edition of the tournament.

Petra Marčinko won the title, defeating Alevtina Ibragimova in the final; 6–4, 6–4.

== Seeds ==
1. Anastasia Zakharova (quarterfinals)
2. (Austria) Sinja Kraus (first round)
3. (Croatia) Petra Marčinko (champion)
4. (Netherlands) Arantxa Rus (first round)
5. (Ukraine) Daria Snigur (semifinals)
6. Polina Iatcenko (first round, retired)
7. Elena Pridankina (quarterfinals)
8. (Australia) Arina Rodionova (first round)

== Draw ==
Key

- Q = Qualifier
- WC = Wild card
- LL = Lucky loser
- Alt = Alternate
- ITF = ITF entry
- PR = Protected ranking
- SR = Special ranking
- SE = Special exempt
- JE = Junior exempt
- JR = Junior Accelerator Programme entrant
- CO = College Accelerator Programme entrant
- NG = Next Gen Accelerator Program entrant
- w/o = Walkover
- r = Retired
- d = Defaulted

=== Finals ===
Semifinals
Q	Alevtina Ibragimova	4	6	6
(Germany) Caroline Werner	6	3	3
3	(Croatia) Petra Marčinko	4	6	6
5	(Ukraine) Daria Snigur	6	4	1

Final
Q	Alevtina Ibragimova	4	4
3	(Croatia) Petra Marčinko	6	6

=== Top half ===
First round
1	A Zakharova	6	6
(Switzerland) V Ryser	1	2
(Sweden) K Rinaldo Persson	4	6	6
LL	K Zaytseva	6	0	4
(Spain) G García Pérez	5	0
Q	A Ibragimova	7	6
(Croatia) T Würth	4
6	P Iatcenko	3^{r}
4	(Netherlands) A Rus	3	1
(Czech Republic) V Valdmannová	6	6
Q	R Zolotareva	6	6
Q	D Zelinskaya	3	3
Q	(Romania) B Szabó	6	7
WC	(Romania) Ș Bojică	2	5
(Germany) C Werner	6	6
8	(Australia) Ar Rodionova	4	4

Second round
1	A Zakharova	6	2	6
(Sweden) K Rinaldo Persson	1	6	3
Q	A Ibragimova	6	6
(Croatia) T Würth	1	1
(Czech Republic) V Valdmannová	6	4	6
Q	R Zolotareva	4	6	1
Q	(Romania) B Szabó	4	3
(Germany) C Werner	6	6

Quarterfinals
1	A Zakharova	6	6^{10}	5
Q	A Ibragimova	2	7^{12}	7
(Czech Republic) V Valdmannová	4	0
(Germany) C Werner	6	6

Semifinals
Q	A Ibragimova	4	6	6
(Germany) C Werner	6	3	3

=== Bottom half ===
First round
7	E Pridankina	7	7
A Shubladze	5	5
(Slovenia) D Jakupović	7	6
(Netherlands) A Hartono	5	0
Q	(Poland) M Podlińska	5	0
(Italy) TC Grant	7	6
Q	(Israel) L Glushko	2	1
3	(Croatia) P Marčinko	6	6
5	(Ukraine) D Snigur	6	6
E Andreeva	1	1
(Australia) O Gadecki	6	6
WC	A Yuneva	2	4
Q	(Turkey) İ Öz	4	7^{7}	7
Q	(Poland) G Feistel	6	6^{2}	5
(Slovakia) V Hrunčáková	2	6	6
2	(Austria) S Kraus	6	3	3

Second round
7	E Pridankina	6	6
(Slovenia) D Jakupović	4	3
(Italy) TC Grant	3	1
3	(Croatia) P Marčinko	6	6
5	(Ukraine) D Snigur	6	2	6
(Australia) O Gadecki	2	6	2
Q	(Turkey) İ Öz	3	2
(Slovakia) V Hrunčáková	6	6

Quarterfinals
7	E Pridankina	7	2	1
3	(Croatia) P Marčinko	5	6	6
5	(Ukraine) D Snigur	6	6
(Slovakia) V Hrunčáková	4	2

Semifinals
3	(Croatia) P Marčinko	4	6	6
5	(Ukraine) D Snigur	6	4	1
