= Tiphanie Lemaître =

French tennis player (born 2000)

- Country (sports): France
- Born: 17 May 2000 (age 26)
- Plays: Right-handed
- Prize money: $145,586

Singles
- Career record: 235–224
- Career titles: 3 ITF
- Highest ranking: No. 317 (2 February 2026)
- Current ranking: No. 402 (18 May 2026)

Doubles
- Career record: 165–120
- Career titles: 15 ITF
- Highest ranking: No. 199 (20 April 2026)
- Current ranking: No. 205 (18 May 2026)

Grand Slam doubles results
- French Open: 1R (2026)
- Last updated on: 10 September 2026.

Tiphanie Lemaître (born 17 May 2000) is a French tennis player. She reached a career-high WTA singles ranking of No. 317 on 2 February 2026 and her best doubles ranking of No. 199 on 20 April 2026.

== Career ==
From Rouen, Lemaître competed in the United States for Texas Christian University in 2023. That May, she earned her second title victory on the ITF Circuit in Huntsville. Later that year, she recorded a win as a qualifier over Margaux Rouvroy in the first round of the 2023 Open de Rouen.

In 2025, Lemaître was runner-up at Cherbourg-en-Cotentin, losing in the final in three sets to compatriot Manon Léonard. She received a main-draw wildcard from the 2025 Open de Limoges where she defeated Océane Dodin, before losing in the round of 16 to top-seeded Cristina Bucșa.

In May 2026, she received a wildcard from the 2026 French Open into the doubles main draw with her partner Alice Ramé.
