= 2023 Open de Rouen =

- Date: 9–15 October
- Edition: 2nd
- Category: WTA 125
- Draw: 32S / 16D
- Prize money: $115,000
- Surface: Hard (indoor)
- Location: Rouen, France
- Venue: Kindarena

Champions

Singles
- (Switzerland) Viktorija Golubic

Doubles
- (United Kingdom) Maia Lumsden / (France) Jessika Ponchet
← 2022 ·	Open de Rouen	· 2024 →

The 2023 Open de Rouen (also known as the Open Capfinances Rouen Métropole for sponsorship reasons) was a professional women's tennis tournament played on indoor hard courts. It was the second edition of the tournament and part of the 2023 WTA 125 tournaments, offering a total of $115,000 in prize money. It took place at the Kindarena Sports Complex in Rouen, France between 9 and 15 October 2023.

== Singles entrants ==
=== Seeds ===
Country	Player	Rank^{1}	Seed
BEL	Greet Minnen	61	1
FRA	Clara Burel	72	2
~~UKR~~	~~Kateryna Baindl~~	~~89~~	~~3~~
GBR	Jodie Burrage	84	4
FRA	Alizé Cornet	96	5
BUL	Viktoriya Tomova	97	6
ROU	Jaqueline Cristian	102	7
HUN	Anna Bondár	106	8
SUI	Viktorija Golubic	107	9

- ^{1} Rankings are as of 18 September 2023.

=== Other entrants ===
The following players received a wildcard into the singles main draw:

- (France) Fiona Ferro
- (France) Elsa Jacquemot
- (France) Chloe Paquet
- (France) Alice Robbe

The following players received entry into the main draw through qualification:

- Erika Andreeva
- (France) Tiphanie Lemaître
- (France) Margaux Rouvroy
- (Australia) Astra Sharma

The following player received entry as a lucky loser:

- Iryna Shymanovich

=== Withdrawals ===
- (Ukraine) Kateryna Baindl → replaced by Iryna Shymanovich
- (United States) Lauren Davis → replaced by (France) Jessika Ponchet
- (Spain) Rebeka Masarova → replaced by (France) Léolia Jeanjean
- (Germany) Jule Niemeier → replaced by (Hungary) Dalma Gálfi
- (Denmark) Clara Tauson → replaced by (Ukraine) Daria Snigur

== Doubles entrants ==
=== Seeds ===
Country	Player	Country	Player	Rank^{1}	Seed
HUN	Anna Bondár	BEL	Kimberley Zimmermann	111	1
	Alena Fomina-Klotz		Iryna Shymanovich	191	2
GBR	Alicia Barnett	GBR	Olivia Nicholls	197	3
ESP	Aliona Bolsova	GEO	Natela Dzalamidze	205	4

- ^{1} Rankings as of 2 October 2023.

=== Other entrants ===
The following pair received a wildcard into the doubles main draw:

- (France) Léolia Jeanjean / (France) Tiphanie Lemaître

== Champions ==
=== Singles ===
- (Switzerland) Viktorija Golubic def. Erika Andreeva, 6–4, 6–1

=== Doubles ===
- (United Kingdom) Maia Lumsden / (France) Jessika Ponchet def. (Hungary) Anna Bondár / (Belgium) Kimberley Zimmermann 6–3, 7–6^{(7–4)}
