= 2026 Athens Open =

- Date: 13 – 19 July
- Edition: 1st
- Category: WTA 250
- Draw: 32S / 16D
- Prize money: €246,388
- Surface: Hard
- Location: Athens, Greece
- Venue: Athens Olympic Tennis Centre, Stadion Sports Center

Champions

Singles
- (Czech Republic) Barbora Krejčíková

Doubles
- (Chinese Taipei) Chan Hao-ching / (Japan) Miyu Kato
- Athens Open

The 2026 Athens Open, also known as the Vanda Pharmaceuticals Athens Open for sponsorship reasons, was a WTA tournament played on outdoor hardcourts as part of the 2026 WTA Tour. It was the inaugural edition of the tournament and took place at the Athens Olympic Tennis Centre in Athens, Greece from 13 July through 19 July 2026. The tournament replaced the Jiangxi Open on the WTA schedule and marked a return of the WTA Tour to Athens after an absence of 35 years. Third-seeded Barbora Krejčíková won the singles title.

== Finals ==
=== Singles ===
- (Czech Republic) Barbora Krejčíková defeated (Greece) Maria Sakkari, 7–6^{(7–5)}, 6–3

=== Doubles ===
- (Chinese Taipei) Chan Hao-ching / (Japan) Miyu Kato defeated (United Kingdom) Maia Lumsden / (China) Tang Qianhui, 7–6^{(7–3)}, 4–6, [10–7]

== Singles main draw entrants ==
=== Seeds ===
Country	Player	Rank^{1}	Seed
DEN	Clara Tauson	25	1
USA	Ann Li	29	2
CZE	Barbora Krejčíková	38	3
GRE	Maria Sakkari	43	4
CZE	Sára Bejlek	45	5
ESP	Jéssica Bouzas Maneiro	52	6
CZE	Tereza Valentová	54	7
POL	Magda Linette	59	8

- Rankings are as of 29 June 2026.

=== Other entrants ===
The following players received wildcards into the singles main draw:

- (Greece) Marianne Argyrokastriti
- (Greece) Valentini Grammatikopoulou
- (Greece) Martha Matoula
- (Greece) Sapfo Sakellaridi

The following players received entry from the qualifying draw:

- (Japan) Nao Hibino
- (Germany) Mina Hodzic
- (Japan) Aoi Ito
- (Australia) Elena Micic
- (Slovakia) Viktória Morvayová
- (Austria) Lilli Tagger

The following player received entry as a lucky loser:

- (Italy) Miriana Tona

=== Withdrawals ===
- (Australia) Maya Joint → replaced by (Uzbekistan) Polina Kudermetova
- (Germany) Eva Lys → replaced by (France) Carole Monnet
- (Colombia) Camila Osorio → replaced by (China) Zheng Qinwen
- (France) Diane Parry → replaced by (United Kingdom) Harriet Dart
- (Germany) Ella Seidel → replaced by (Switzerland) Rebeka Masarova
- (New Zealand) Lulu Sun → replaced by (Belgium) Sofia Costoulas
- (Australia) Ajla Tomljanović → replaced by (Italy) Miriana Tona
- (Ukraine) Dayana Yastremska → replaced by (Bulgaria) Viktoriya Tomova
- (Mexico) Renata Zarazúa → replaced by Aliaksandra Sasnovich

== Doubles main draw entrants ==
=== Seeds ===
Country	Player	Country	Player	Rank^{†}	Seed
TPE	Chan Hao-ching	JPN	Miyu Kato	95	1
CHN	Jiang Xinyu	TPE	Wu Fang-hsien	96	2
HKG	Eudice Chong	POL	Katarzyna Piter	118	3
UKR	Nadiia Kichenok	JPN	Makoto Ninomiya	126	4

† Rankings are as of 29 June 2026

=== Other entrants ===
The following pairs received wildcards into the main draw:

- (Greece) Marianne Argyrokastriti / Elina Nepliy
- (Greece) Valentini Grammatikopoulou / (Greece) Martha Matoula
