= 2025 Open de Rouen =

- Date: 14–20 April
- Edition: 4th
- Category: WTA 250
- Draw: 32S / 16D
- Surface: Clay (indoor)
- Location: Rouen, France
- Venue: Kindarena

Champions

Singles
- (Ukraine) Elina Svitolina

Doubles
- (Serbia) Aleksandra Krunić / (United States) Sabrina Santamaria
← 2024 ·	Open de Rouen	· 2026 →

The 2025 Open de Rouen (also known as the Open Capfinances Rouen Métropole for sponsorship reasons) was a professional women's tennis tournament played on indoor clay courts. It was the fourth edition of the tournament and part of the WTA 250 tournaments on the 2025 WTA Tour. It took place at the Kindarena Sports Complex in Rouen, France between 14 and 20 April 2025.

== Champions ==
=== Singles ===
- (Ukraine) Elina Svitolina def. (Serbia) Olga Danilović, 6–4, 7–6^{(10–8)}

=== Doubles ===
- (Serbia) Aleksandra Krunić / (United States) Sabrina Santamaria def. Irina Khromacheva / (Czech Republic) Linda Nosková, 6–0, 6–4

== Singles main draw entrants ==
=== Seeds ===
Country	Player	Rank^{1}	Seed
UKR	Elina Svitolina	18	1
CZE	Linda Nosková	33	2
SRB	Olga Danilović	39	3
USA	McCartney Kessler	43	4
JPN	Moyuka Uchijima	51	5
USA	Alycia Parks	54	6
ITA	Lucia Bronzetti	59	7
GBR	Sonay Kartal	60	8

- ^{1} Rankings are as of 7 April 2025.

=== Other entrants ===
The following players received a wildcard into the singles main draw:

- (Canada) Bianca Andreescu
- (France) Loïs Boisson
- (France) Elsa Jacquemot
- (France) Diane Parry

The following players received entry from the qualifying draw:

- (France) Fiona Ferro
- (Japan) Nao Hibino
- (Serbia) Aleksandra Krunić
- (France) Tiantsoa Rakotomanga Rajaonah
- (Italy) Camilla Rosatello
- (France) Margaux Rouvroy

The following players received entry as lucky losers:

- (Italy) Nuria Brancaccio
- (Czech Republic) Linda Fruhvirtová
- (France) Jessika Ponchet

=== Withdrawals ===
- (Armenia) Elina Avanesyan → replaced by Anna Blinkova
- (Romania) Irina-Camelia Begu → replaced by (United Kingdom) Harriet Dart
- (Czech Republic) Marie Bouzková → replaced by (Netherlands) Suzan Lamens
- (United States) Sofia Kenin → replaced by (United States) Bernarda Pera
- (United States) Ann Li → replaced by (France) Jessika Ponchet
- (Poland) Magda Linette → replaced by (Italy) Nuria Brancaccio
- (United Kingdom) Emma Raducanu → replaced by (Romania) Jaqueline Cristian
- (Czech Republic) Kateřina Siniaková → replaced by (Romania) Elena-Gabriela Ruse
- (Bulgaria) Viktoriya Tomova → replaced by (Czech Republic) Linda Fruhvirtová
- (China) Wang Xinyu → replaced by (Switzerland) Jil Teichmann

== Doubles main draw entrants ==
=== Seeds ===
Country	Player	Country	Player	Rank^{1}	Seed
	Irina Khromacheva	CZE	Linda Nosková	98	1
JPN	Makoto Ninomiya	POL	Katarzyna Piter	110	2
GBR	Emily Appleton	CHN	Tang Qianhui	148	3
JPN	Nao Hibino	GBR	Maia Lumsden	163	4

- ^{1} Rankings as of 7 April 2025.

=== Other entrants ===
The following pairs received wildcards into the doubles main draw:

- (France) Elsa Jacquemot / (France) Jessika Ponchet
- (France) Tiphanie Lemaître / (France) Margaux Rouvroy
