= 2024 Open de Rouen =

- Date: 15–21 April
- Edition: 3rd
- Category: WTA 250
- Draw: 32S / 16D
- Prize money: $267,082
- Surface: Clay (indoor)
- Location: Rouen, France
- Venue: Kindarena

Champions

Singles
- (United States) Sloane Stephens

Doubles
- (Hungary) Tímea Babos / Irina Khromacheva
← 2023 ·	Open de Rouen	· 2025 →

The 2024 Open de Rouen (also known as the Open Capfinances Rouen Métropole for sponsorship reasons) was a professional women's tennis tournament played on indoor clay courts. It was the third edition of the tournament and part of the WTA 250 tournaments on the 2024 WTA Tour (an upgrade from the WTA 125 tournament status for the two previous editions). It took place at the Kindarena Sports Complex in Rouen, France between 15 and 21 April 2024.

== Champions ==
=== Singles ===
- (United States) Sloane Stephens def. (Poland) Magda Linette, 6–1, 2–6, 6–2

=== Doubles ===
- (Hungary) Tímea Babos / Irina Khromacheva def. (United Kingdom) Naiktha Bains / (United Kingdom) Maia Lumsden, 6–3, 6–4

== Singles main draw entrants ==
=== Seeds ===
Country	Player	Rank^{1}	Seed
	Anastasia Pavlyuchenkova	22	1
FRA	Caroline Garcia	23	2
UKR	Anhelina Kalinina	32	3
CHN	Yuan Yue	38	4
	Mirra Andreeva	39	5
USA	Sloane Stephens	40	6
FRA	Clara Burel	44	7
	Anna Blinkova	45	8

- ^{1} Rankings are as of 8 April 2024.

=== Other entrants ===
The following players received a wildcard into the singles main draw:

- (France) Elsa Jacquemot
- (Japan) Naomi Osaka
- (France) Alice Robbe

The following players received entry from the qualifying draw:

- (France) Fiona Ferro
- Polina Kudermetova
- (United States) Robin Montgomery
- (Romania) Elena-Gabriela Ruse
- (Serbia) Natalija Stevanović
- (Ukraine) Katarina Zavatska

=== Withdrawals ===
- (Czech Republic) Marie Bouzková → replaced by (Slovakia) Anna Karolína Schmiedlová
- (Italy) Lucia Bronzetti → replaced by (Japan) Nao Hibino
- (United States) Sofia Kenin → replaced by (Egypt) Mayar Sherif
- (Croatia) Petra Martić → replaced by (Argentina) Nadia Podoroska
- (Spain) Sara Sorribes Tormo → replaced by (France) Varvara Gracheva
- (China) Zhu Lin → replaced by (Bulgaria) Viktoriya Tomova

== Doubles main draw entrants ==
=== Seeds ===
Country	Player	Country	Player	Rank^{1}	Seed
JPN	Miyu Kato	ROU	Monica Niculescu	76	1
HUN	Tímea Babos		Irina Khromacheva	125	2
ITA	Angelica Moratelli	ITA	Camilla Rosatello	149	3
	Lidziya Marozava	BEL	Kimberley Zimmermann	154	4

- ^{1} Rankings as of 8 April 2024.

=== Other entrants ===
The following pair received a wildcard into the doubles main draw:

- (France) Alizé Cornet / (France) Fiona Ferro
