= 2026 Open de Rouen – Doubles =

Doubles
- 2026 Open de Rouen

Final
- Champions: (Czech Republic) Jesika Malečková (Czech Republic) Miriam Škoch
- Runners-up: (Chinese Taipei) Liang En-shuo (China) Tang Qianhui
- Score: 6–2, 7–5

Details
- Draw: 16
- Seeds: 4

Events
Singles	Doubles
- Open de Rouen

Jesika Malečková and Miriam Škoch defeated Liang En-Shuo and Tang Qianhui in the final, 6–2, 7–5 to win the doubles tennis title at the 2026 Open de Rouen.

Aleksandra Krunić and Sabrina Santamaria were the reigning champions, but did not participate this year.

== Seeds ==
1. Irina Khromacheva / (Mexico) Giuliana Olmos (quarterfinals)
2. Maria Kozyreva / Iryna Shymanovich (semifinals)
3. (Ukraine) Nadiia Kichenok / (Japan) Makoto Ninomiya (first round)
4. (Czech Republic) Jesika Malečková / (Czech Republic) Miriam Škoch (champions)

== Draw ==
Key

- Q = Qualifier
- WC = Wild card
- LL = Lucky loser
- Alt = Alternate
- ITF = ITF entry
- PR = Protected ranking
- SR = Special ranking
- SE = Special exempt
- JE = Junior exempt
- JR = Junior Accelerator Programme entrant
- CO = College Accelerator Programme entrant
- NG = Next Gen Accelerator Program entrant
- w/o = Walkover
- r = Retired
- d = Defaulted

=== Draw ===
First round
1	I Khromacheva (Mexico) G Olmos	6	6
(China) Xin Wang (China) S Zheng	2	3
(Czech Republic) A Dețiuc (Czech Republic) D Šalková	6	3	[7]
WC	(France) E Jacquemot (France) T Rakotomanga Rajaonah	1	6	[10]
3	(Ukraine) N Kichenok (Japan) M Ninomiya	3	4
(Chinese Taipei) E-s Liang (China) Q Tang	6	6
(China) S Feng (Slovenia) N Radišić	6^{3}	6	[10]
(Japan) M Kobori (Thailand) P Plipuech	7^{7}	2	[4]
(France) E Cascino (Argentina) N Fossa Huergo	7^{7}	6
(Belgium) M Kempen (Poland) K Piter	6^{3}	4
(Netherlands) I Haverlag (United Kingdom) M Lumsden	6	4	[9]
4	(Czech Republic) J Malečková (Czech Republic) M Škoch	4	6	[11]
WC	(France) Y Bartashevich (France) M Mattel	4	4
(France) T Lemaître (France) J Ponchet	6	6
(United States) S Stephens (United States) K Volynets	4	3
2	M Kozyreva; I Shymanovich	6	6

Quarterfinals
1	I Khromacheva (Mexico) G Olmos	0	6	[7]
WC	(France) E Jacquemot (France) T Rakotomanga Rajaonah	6	2	[10]
(Chinese Taipei) E-s Liang (China) Q Tang	6	6
(China) S Feng (Slovenia) N Radišić	2	4
(France) E Cascino (Argentina) N Fossa Huergo	1	3
4	(Czech Republic) J Malečková (Czech Republic) M Škoch	6	6
(France) T Lemaître (France) J Ponchet
2	M Kozyreva; I Shymanovich	w/o

Semifinals
WC	(France) E Jacquemot (France) T Rakotomanga Rajaonah	6	4	[9]
(Chinese Taipei) E-s Liang (China) Q Tang	3	6	[11]
4	(Czech Republic) J Malečková (Czech Republic) M Škoch	6	2	[14]
2	M Kozyreva; I Shymanovich	2	6	[12]

Final
(Chinese Taipei) E-s Liang (China) Q Tang	2	5
4	(Czech Republic) J Malečková (Czech Republic) M Škoch	6	7
