= 2026 Prague Open =

Women's tennis tournament

- Date: 20–26 July
- Edition: 17th
- Category: WTA 250
- Draw: 32S / 15D
- Surface: Hard / outdoor
- Location: Prague, Czech Republic
- Venue: I. ČLTK Prague

Champions

Singles
- (Austria) Lilli Tagger

Doubles
- (United Kingdom) Harriet Dart / (United Kingdom) Maia Lumsden
- WTA Prague Open

The 2026 Prague Open (branded as the Livesport Prague Open for sponsorship reasons) was a professional women's tennis tournament played on outdoor hard courts at the I. ČLTK Prague at Štvanice. It was the 17th edition of the tournament, and a WTA 250 tournament on the 2026 WTA Tour. It took place in Prague, Czech Republic from 20 to 26 July 2026.

== Champions ==
=== Singles ===
- (Austria) Lilli Tagger def. (Ukraine) Daria Snigur 7–6^{(7–3)}, 6–2

=== Doubles ===
- (United Kingdom) Harriet Dart / (United Kingdom) Maia Lumsden def. (Czech Republic) Lucie Havlíčková / (Czech Republic) Laura Samson 6–4, 6–4

== Singles main draw entrants ==
=== Seeds ===
Country	Player	Rank^{†}	Seed
CZE	Marie Bouzková	21	1
CZE	Barbora Krejčíková	32	2
CZE	Sára Bejlek	42	3
CZE	Nikola Bartůňková	43	4
CZE	Tereza Valentová	49	5
CRO	Antonia Ružić	50	6
FRA	Diane Parry	55	7
UKR	Daria Snigur	56	8

^{†} Rankings are as of 13 July 2026.

=== Other entrants ===
The following players received wildcards into the singles main draw:

- (Czech Republic) Lucie Havlíčková
- (Czech Republic) Jana Kovačková
- (Czech Republic) Alisa Oktiabreva
- (Czech Republic) Laura Samson

The following player received entry using a protected ranking:

- (France) Océane Dodin

The following players received entry from the qualifying draw:

- (Belgium) Sofia Costoulas
- (China) Gao Xinyu
- (Japan) Mai Hontama
- (United States) Carol Young Suh Lee
- (Ukraine) Veronika Podrez
- (Czech Republic) Dominika Šalková

The following players received entry as lucky losers:

- (Turkey) Ayla Aksu
- (Czech Republic) Linda Fruhvirtová
- (Australia) Priscilla Hon

=== Withdrawals ===
- Alina Korneeva → replaced by (Czech Republic) Linda Fruhvirtová
- (Poland) Magda Linette → replaced by (China) Yuan Yue
- (Germany) Eva Lys → replaced by (Australia) Priscilla Hon
- (Belgium) Elise Mertens → replaced by Anna Blinkova
- (Greece) Maria Sakkari → replaced by (Turkey) Ayla Aksu
- (Australia) Ajla Tomljanović → replaced by Aliaksandra Sasnovich

== Doubles main draw entrants ==
=== Seeds ===
Country	Player	Country	Player	Rank^{†}	Seed
~~CHN~~	~~Jiang Xinyu~~	~~TPE~~	~~Wu Fang-hsien~~	~~90~~	~~1~~
JPN	Ena Shibahara		Vera Zvonareva	97	2
TPE	Chan Hao-ching	JPN	Miyu Kato	102	3
GBR	Harriet Dart	GBR	Maia Lumsden	151	4
BRA	Ingrid Martins	JPN	Makoto Ninomiya	170	5

^{†} Rankings are as of 13 July 2026.

=== Other entrants ===
The following pairs received wildcards into the doubles main draw:

- (Czech Republic) Alena Kovačková / (Czech Republic) Jana Kovačková
- (Czech Republic) Tereza Krejčová / (Czech Republic) Denisa Žoldáková

=== Withdrawals ===
- (China) Jiang Xinyu / (Chinese Taipei) Wu Fang-hsien → not replaced
