= 2024 Open de Rouen – Singles =

Singles
- 2024 Open de Rouen

Final
- Champion: (United States) Sloane Stephens
- Runner-up: (Poland) Magda Linette
- Score: 6–1, 2–6, 6–2

Details
- Draw: 32 (4 WC)
- Seeds: 8

Events
Singles	Doubles
← 2023 ·	Open de Rouen	· 2025 →

Sloane Stephens defeated Magda Linette in the final, 6–1, 2–6, 6–2 to win the singles tennis title at the 2024 Open de Rouen. It was her eighth career WTA Tour singles title, and her first on red clay.

Viktorija Golubic was the reigning champion, but did not participate this year.

== Seeds ==
1. Anastasia Pavlyuchenkova (second round)
2. (France) Caroline Garcia (semifinals)
3. (Ukraine) Anhelina Kalinina (semifinals)
4. (China) Yuan Yue (quarterfinals)
5. Mirra Andreeva (quarterfinals)
6. (United States) Sloane Stephens (champion)
7. (France) Clara Burel (second round)
8. Anna Blinkova (first round)

== Draw ==
=== Key ===
- Q = Qualifier
- WC = Wild card
- LL = Lucky loser
- Alt = Alternate
- ITF = ITF entry
- PR = Protected ranking
- SR = Special ranking
- SE = Special exempt
- JE = Junior exempt
- JR = Junior Accelerator Programme entrant
- CO = College Accelerator Programme entrant
- NG = Next Gen Accelerator Program entrant
- w/o = Walkover
- r = Retired
- d = Defaulted

=== Finals ===
Semifinals
(Poland) Magda Linette	6	4	6
3	(Ukraine) Anhelina Kalinina	1	6	2
6	(United States) Sloane Stephens	6	6
2	(France) Caroline Garcia	3	2

Final
(Poland) Magda Linette	1	6	2
6	(United States) Sloane Stephens	6	2	6

=== Top half ===
First round
1	A Pavlyuchenkova	6	6
WC	(France) A Robbe	2	2
Q	(United States) R Montgomery	3	1
(Netherlands) A Rus	6	6
(Poland) M Linette	7	6
WC	(France) E Jacquemot	5	1
Q	(Serbia) N Stevanović	7^{7}	3	7^{7}
8	A Blinkova	6^{2}	6	6^{2}
3	(Ukraine) A Kalinina	6	7
(France) A Cornet	4	5
(Italy) M Trevisan	6	6
WC	(Japan) N Osaka	4	2
Q	(France) F Ferro	2	6	5
E Avanesyan	6	1	7
(Argentina) N Podoroska	1	3
5	M Andreeva	6	6

Second round
1	A Pavlyuchenkova	3	6	3
(Netherlands) A Rus	6	1	6
(Poland) M Linette	6	6
Q	(Serbia) N Stevanović	2	1
3	(Ukraine) A Kalinina	6	6
(Italy) M Trevisan	2	3
E Avanesyan	5	4
5	M Andreeva	7	6

Quarterfinals
(Netherlands) A Rus	6^{9}	1
(Poland) M Linette	7^{11}	6
3	(Ukraine) A Kalinina	6	7
5	M Andreeva	4	5

Semifinals
(Poland) M Linette	6	4	6
3	(Ukraine) A Kalinina	1	6	2

=== Bottom half ===
First round
6	(United States) S Stephens	1	6	6
(United States) P Stearns	6	1	3
(Czech Republic) Ka Plíšková	7	1	7
Q	P Kudermetova	5	6	5
(France) V Gracheva	6	3	7
(Bulgaria) V Tomova	2	6	5
(Egypt) M Sherif	3	6^{7}
4	(China) Y Yuan	6	7^{9}
7	(France) C Burel	3	6	6
Q	(Ukraine) K Zavatska	6	3	2
(Japan) N Hibino	2	1
Q	(Romania) E-G Ruse	6	6
(Slovakia) AK Schmiedlová	3	3
(France) D Parry	6	1^{r}
(Italy) E Cocciaretto	1	6	5
2	(France) C Garcia	6	3	7

Second round
6	(United States) S Stephens	6	6
(Czech Republic) Ka Plíšková	3	2
(France) V Gracheva	4	6	6^{6}
4	(China) Y Yuan	6	4	7^{8}
7	(France) C Burel	0	6	3
Q	(Romania) E-G Ruse	6	2	6
(Slovakia) AK Schmiedlová	1	0
2	(France) C Garcia	6	6

Quarterfinals
6	(United States) S Stephens	6	6
4	(China) Y Yuan	2	2
Q	(Romania) E-G Ruse	3	4
2	(France) C Garcia	6	6

Semifinals
6	(United States) S Stephens	6	6
2	(France) C Garcia	3	2

== Qualifying ==
=== Seeds ===
1. (United States) Elizabeth Mandlik (qualifying competition)
2. (France) Fiona Ferro (qualified)
3. (France) Jessika Ponchet (qualifying competition)
4. (Romania) Irina Bara (qualifying competition)
5. (Romania) Elena-Gabriela Ruse (qualified)
6. Ekaterina Makarova (first round)
7. (Hungary) Tímea Babos (qualifying competition)
8. (Czech Republic) Tereza Martincová (first round)
9. Polina Kudermetova (qualified)
10. (United States) Robin Montgomery (qualified)
11. (Ukraine) Katarina Zavatska (qualified)
12. (Serbia) Natalija Stevanović (qualified)

=== Qualifiers ===
1. (Ukraine) Katarina Zavatska
2. (France) Fiona Ferro
3. (United States) Robin Montgomery
4. Polina Kudermetova
5. (Romania) Elena-Gabriela Ruse
6. (Serbia) Natalija Stevanović

=== Qualifying draw ===
==== First qualifier ====
First round
1	(United States) Elizabeth Mandlik	3	6	6
WC	(France) Émeline Dartron	6	0	4
(France) Séléna Janicijevic	6	0	3
11	(Ukraine) Katarina Zavatska	2	6	6

Qualifying competition
1	(United States) Elizabeth Mandlik	2	6^{5}
11	(Ukraine) Katarina Zavatska	6	7^{7}

==== Second qualifier ====
First round
2	(France) Fiona Ferro	6	6
WC	(France) Manon Léonard	4	0
WC	(France) Margaux Rouvroy	4	5
7	(Hungary) Tímea Babos	6	7

Qualifying competition
2	(France) Fiona Ferro	6	6
7	(Hungary) Tímea Babos	4	1

==== Third qualifier ====
First round
3	(France) Jessika Ponchet	6	6
(France) Harmony Tan	1	4
(Ukraine) Valeriya Strakhova	1	1
10	(United States) Robin Montgomery	6	6

Qualifying competition
3	(France) Jessika Ponchet	4	5
10	(United States) Robin Montgomery	6	7

==== Fourth qualifier ====
First round
4	(Romania) Irina Bara	6	7
Jana Kolodynska	3	5
(Slovenia) Dalila Jakupović	6^{3}	6	0
9	Polina Kudermetova	7^{7}	2	6

Qualifying competition
4	(Romania) Irina Bara	3	4
9	Polina Kudermetova	6	6

==== Fifth qualifier ====
First round
5	(Romania) Elena-Gabriela Ruse	7^{7}	6
(Italy) Nuria Brancaccio	6^{5}	4
(Poland) Martyna Kubka	7^{8}	6^{4}	6
8	(Czech Republic) Tereza Martincová	6^{6}	7^{7}	1

Qualifying competition
5	(Romania) Elena-Gabriela Ruse	6	6
(Poland) Martyna Kubka	4	0

==== Sixth qualifier ====
First round
6	Ekaterina Makarova	6	0	1
WC	(France) Tiphanie Lemaître	1	6	6
(Romania) Irina Fetecău	1	2
12	(Serbia) Natalija Stevanović	6	6

Qualifying competition
WC	(France) Tiphanie Lemaître	3	3
12	(Serbia) Natalija Stevanović	6	6
