= 2024 Open de Rouen – Doubles =

Doubles
- 2024 Open de Rouen

Final
- Champions: (Hungary) Tímea Babos; Irina Khromacheva
- Runners-up: (United Kingdom) Naiktha Bains (United Kingdom) Maia Lumsden
- Score: 6–3, 6–4

Events
Singles	Doubles
← 2023 ·	Open de Rouen	· 2025 →

Tímea Babos and Irina Khromacheva defeated Naiktha Bains and Maia Lumsden in the final, 6–3, 6–4 to win the doubles tennis title at the 2024 Open de Rouen.

Lumsden and Jessika Ponchet were the reigning champions, but chose not to compete together. Ponchet partnered Elixane Lechemia but lost in the first round to Arantxa Rus and Mayar Sherif.

== Seeds ==
1. (Japan) Miyu Kato / (Romania) Monica Niculescu (first round)
2. (Hungary) Tímea Babos / Irina Khromacheva (champions)
3. (Italy) Angelica Moratelli / (Italy) Camilla Rosatello (first round)
4. Lidziya Marozava / (Belgium) Kimberley Zimmermann (quarterfinals)

== Draw ==
=== Key ===
- Q = Qualifier
- WC = Wild card
- LL = Lucky loser
- Alt = Alternate
- SE = Special exempt
- PR = Protected ranking
- ITF = ITF entry
- JE = Junior exempt
- w/o = Walkover
- r = Retired
- d = Defaulted
- SR = Special ranking

=== Draw ===
First round
1	(Japan) M Kato (Romania) M Niculescu	6	5	[8]
(Japan) N Hibino (Georgia (country)) O Kalashnikova	3	7	[10]
(Netherlands) A Rus (Egypt) M Sherif	7^{8}	6
(France) E Lechemia (France) J Ponchet	6^{6}	3
4	L Marozava (Belgium) K Zimmermann	6	7
(United States) S Stephens (China) Y Yuan	4	5
(United Kingdom) N Bains (United Kingdom) M Lumsden	3	6	[10]
A Anshba (Ukraine) V Strakhova	6	4	[4]
(United Kingdom) S Murray Sharan (Poland) K Piter	6	7
(Poland) K Kawa (Netherlands) B Schoofs	4	5
(United States) Q Gleason (Slovenia) D Jakupović	4	7^{7}	[10]
3	(Italy) A Moratelli (Italy) C Rosatello	6	6^{3}	[6]
A Blinkova (United Kingdom) O Nicholls	2	6^{4}
WC	(France) A Cornet (France) F Ferro	6	7^{7}
(Romania) E-G Ruse (United States) S Santamaria	3	5
2	(Hungary) T Babos; I Khromacheva	6	7

Quarterfinals
(Japan) N Hibino (Georgia (country)) O Kalashnikova	w/o
(Netherlands) A Rus (Egypt) M Sherif
4	L Marozava (Belgium) K Zimmermann	5	1
(United Kingdom) N Bains (United Kingdom) M Lumsden	7	6
(United Kingdom) S Murray Sharan (Poland) K Piter	7	6
(United States) Q Gleason (Slovenia) D Jakupović	5	0
WC	(France) A Cornet (France) F Ferro	4	6	[5]
2	(Hungary) T Babos; I Khromacheva	6	4	[10]

Semifinals
(Japan) N Hibino (Georgia (country)) O Kalashnikova	6	2	[6]
(United Kingdom) N Bains (United Kingdom) M Lumsden	4	6	[10]
(United Kingdom) S Murray Sharan (Poland) K Piter	2	2
2	(Hungary) T Babos; I Khromacheva	6	6

Final
(United Kingdom) N Bains (United Kingdom) M Lumsden	3	4
2	(Hungary) T Babos; I Khromacheva	6	6
