= 2025 Open de Rouen – Doubles =

Doubles
- 2025 Open de Rouen

Final
- Champions: (Serbia) Aleksandra Krunić (United States) Sabrina Santamaria
- Runners-up: Irina Khromacheva (Czech Republic) Linda Nosková
- Score: 6–0, 6–4

Details
- Draw: 16
- Seeds: 4

Events
Singles	Doubles
- Open de Rouen

Aleksandra Krunić and Sabrina Santamaria defeated defending champion Irina Khromacheva and her partner Linda Nosková in the final, 6–0, 6–4 to win the doubles tennis title at the 2025 Open de Rouen. It was the seventh WTA Tour doubles title for Krunić and third for Santamaria.

Tímea Babos and Khromacheva were the reigning champions, but Babos chose to compete in Stuttgart instead.

== Seeds ==
1. Irina Khromacheva / (Czech Republic) Linda Nosková (final)
2. (Japan) Makoto Ninomiya / (Poland) Katarzyna Piter (first round)
3. (United Kingdom) Emily Appleton / (China) Tang Qianhui (first round)
4. (Japan) Nao Hibino / (United Kingdom) Maia Lumsden (first round)

== Draw ==
Key

- Q = Qualifier
- WC = Wild card
- LL = Lucky loser
- Alt = Alternate
- ITF = ITF entry
- PR = Protected ranking
- SR = Special ranking
- SE = Special exempt
- JE = Junior exempt
- JR = Junior Accelerator Programme entrant
- CO = College Accelerator Programme entrant
- NG = Next Gen Accelerator Program entrant
- w/o = Walkover
- r = Retired
- d = Defaulted

=== Draw ===
First round
1	I Khromacheva (Czech Republic) L Nosková	6	6
A Blinkova (France) V Gracheva	3	2
(United Kingdom) E Silva (Belgium) K Zimmermann	2	4
(United States) B Pera (Romania) E-G Ruse	6	6
3	(United Kingdom) E Appleton (China) Q Tang	7	1	[7]
(United States) Q Gleason (Belgium) M Kempen	5	6	[10]
(Romania) J Cristian (Italy) A Moratelli	6	7^{8}
WC	(France) T Lemaître (France) M Rouvroy	4	6^{6}
(Netherlands) I Haverlag (Poland) A Rosolska	6	5	[5]
(Georgia (country)) O Kalashnikova (Belgium) L Salden	3	7	[10]
(Italy) N Brancaccio (Italy) C Rosatello	6	2	[15]
4	(Japan) N Hibino (United Kingdom) M Lumsden	3	6	[13]
(Japan) S Aoyama (Japan) M Uchijima	4	1
(Serbia) A Krunić (United States) S Santamaria	6	6
WC	(France) E Jacquemot (France) J Ponchet	6	6
2	(Japan) M Ninomiya (Poland) K Piter	2	2

Quarterfinals
1	I Khromacheva (Czech Republic) L Nosková	7^{7}	3	[10]
(United States) B Pera (Romania) E-G Ruse	6^{5}	6	[7]
(United States) Q Gleason (Belgium) M Kempen	6	6^{8}	[10]
(Romania) J Cristian (Italy) A Moratelli	4	7^{10}	[7]
(Georgia (country)) O Kalashnikova (Belgium) L Salden	6^{1}	4
(Italy) N Brancaccio (Italy) C Rosatello	7^{7}	6
(Serbia) A Krunić (United States) S Santamaria	6	3	[10]
WC	(France) E Jacquemot (France) J Ponchet	4	6	[3]

Semifinals
1	I Khromacheva (Czech Republic) L Nosková	6	3	[13]
(United States) Q Gleason (Belgium) M Kempen	2	6	[11]
(Italy) N Brancaccio (Italy) C Rosatello	6	2	[5]
(Serbia) A Krunić (United States) S Santamaria	2	6	[10]

Final
1	I Khromacheva (Czech Republic) L Nosková	0	4
(Serbia) A Krunić (United States) S Santamaria	6	6
