= 2022 Open de Rouen – Doubles =

Doubles
- 2022 Open de Rouen

Final
- Champions: (Georgia (country)) Natela Dzalamidze; Kamilla Rakhimova
- Runners-up: (Japan) Misaki Doi (Georgia (country)) Oksana Kalashnikova
- Score: 6–2, 7–5

Events
Singles	Doubles
Open de Rouen	· 2023 →

This was the first edition of the tournament.

Natela Dzalamidze and Kamilla Rakhimova won the title, defeating Misaki Doi and Oksana Kalashnikova in the final, 6–2, 7–5.

== Seeds ==
1. (Georgia (country)) Natela Dzalamidze / Kamilla Rakhimova (champions)
2. (Japan) Misaki Doi / (Georgia (country)) Oksana Kalashnikova (final)
3. (Switzerland) Viktorija Golubic / (China) Han Xinyun (quarterfinals)
4. (United Kingdom) Harriet Dart / (Hungary) Dalma Gálfi (first round, withdrew)

== Draw ==
=== Key ===
- Q = Qualifier
- WC = Wild card
- LL = Lucky loser
- Alt = Alternate
- ITF = ITF entry
- PR = Protected ranking
- SR = Special ranking
- SE = Special exempt
- JE = Junior exempt
- JR = Junior Accelerator Programme entrant
- CO = College Accelerator Programme entrant
- NG = Next Gen Accelerator Program entrant
- w/o = Walkover
- r = Retired
- d = Defaulted

=== Draw ===
First round
(India) A Raina (Netherlands) R van der Hoek	6	7
(France) E Cascino (Bulgaria) V Tomova	2	5
4	(United Kingdom) H Dart (Hungary) D Gálfi
(France) E Lechemia (United Kingdom) E Webley-Smith	w/o
WC	(France) A Albié (France) A Robbe	2	3
(France) J Ponchet (Czech Republic) R Voráčová	6	6
(France) E Jacquemot (France) L Jeanjean	6	4	[4]
(Romania) J Cristian (Romania) M Niculescu	3	6	[10]
A Gasanova; A Komardina
(Ukraine) D Yastremska (Ukraine) I Yastremska	w/o

Quarterfinals
1	(Georgia (country)) N Dzalamidze; K Rakhimova	3	6	[10]
(India) A Raina (Netherlands) R van der Hoek	6	3	[7]
(France) E Lechemia (United Kingdom) E Webley-Smith	5	1
(France) J Ponchet (Czech Republic) R Voráčová	7	6
(Romania) J Cristian (Romania) M Niculescu	6	7^{7}
3	(Switzerland) V Golubic (China) X Han	2	6^{5}
(Ukraine) D Yastremska (Ukraine) I Yastremska	3	6^{8}
2	(Japan) M Doi (Georgia (country)) O Kalashnikova	6	7^{10}

Semifinals
1	(Georgia (country)) N Dzalamidze; K Rakhimova	6	1	[10]
(France) J Ponchet (Czech Republic) R Voráčová	3	6	[6]
(Romania) J Cristian (Romania) M Niculescu	5	4
2	(Japan) M Doi (Georgia (country)) O Kalashnikova	7	6

Final
1	(Georgia (country)) N Dzalamidze; K Rakhimova	6	7
2	(Japan) M Doi (Georgia (country)) O Kalashnikova	2	5
