= 2026 Prague Open – Doubles =

Doubles
- 2026 Prague Open

Final
- Champions: (United Kingdom) Harriet Dart (United Kingdom) Maia Lumsden
- Runners-up: (Czech Republic) Lucie Havlíčková (Czech Republic) Laura Samson
- Score: 6–4, 6–4
- Date: 26 July 2026

Details
- Draw: 15 (2 WC)
- Seeds: 4

Events
Singles	Doubles
- WTA Prague Open

Harriet Dart and Maia Lumsden defeated Lucie Havlíčková and Laura Samson in the final, 6–4, 6–4 to win the doubles tennis title at the 2026 Prague Open. It was both Dart and Lumsden's second WTA Tour career doubles title, just five weeks after their first at the Nottingham Open.

Nadiia Kichenok and Makoto Ninomiya were the defending champions, but chose not to compete together this year. Kichenok partnered Martyna Kubka, but lost in the first round to Ninomiya and Ingrid Martins. Martins and Ninomiya lost in the quarterfinals to Alena and Jana Kovačková.

== Seeds ==
1. (China) Jiang Xinyu / (Chinese Taipei) Wu Fang-hsien (withdrew)
2. (Japan) Ena Shibahara / Vera Zvonareva (first round)
3. (Chinese Taipei) Chan Hao-ching / (Japan) Miyu Kato (semifinals)
4. (United Kingdom) Harriet Dart / (United Kingdom) Maia Lumsden (champions)
5. (Brazil) Ingrid Martins / (Japan) Makoto Ninomiya (quarterfinals)

== Draw ==
Key

- Q = Qualifier
- WC = Wild card
- LL = Lucky loser
- Alt = Alternate
- ITF = ITF entry
- PR = Protected ranking
- SR = Special ranking
- SE = Special exempt
- JE = Junior exempt
- JR = Junior Accelerator Programme entrant
- CO = College Accelerator Programme entrant
- NG = Next Gen Accelerator Program entrant
- w/o = Walkover
- r = Retired
- d = Defaulted

First round
5	(Brazil) I Martins (Japan) M Ninomiya	3	6	[10]
(Ukraine) N Kichenok (Poland) M Kubka	6	4	[7]
WC	(Czech Republic) A Kovačková (Czech Republic) J Kovačková	3	6	[10]
(United States) C Corley (United States) C Harrison	6	3	[6]
4	(United Kingdom) H Dart (United Kingdom) M Lumsden	6	6
(Argentina) N Fossa Huergo (Australia) P Hon	2	2
PR	(United Kingdom) A Barnett (United Kingdom) S Murray Sharan	3	5
(Czech Republic) N Bartůňková (Czech Republic) D Šalková	6	7
(Poland) W Falkowska (United States) A Smith	6	6
(Thailand) P Plipuech (India) P Thombare	1	2
WC	(Czech Republic) T Krejčová (Czech Republic) D Žoldáková	6	3	[7]
3	(Chinese Taipei) H-c Chan (Japan) M Kato	3	6	[10]
(Chinese Taipei) Y-h Lee (China) Q Ye	1	6	[10]
2	(Japan) E Shibahara; V Zvonareva	6	2	[6]

Quarterfinals
5	(Brazil) I Martins (Japan) M Ninomiya	6	3	[9]
WC	(Czech Republic) A Kovačková (Czech Republic) J Kovačková	3	6	[11]
4	(United Kingdom) H Dart (United Kingdom) M Lumsden	w/o
(Czech Republic) N Bartůňková (Czech Republic) D Šalková
(Poland) W Falkowska (United States) A Smith	6	5	[7]
3	(Chinese Taipei) H-c Chan (Japan) M Kato	1	7	[10]
(Czech Republic) L Havlíčková (Czech Republic) L Samson	7	6
(Chinese Taipei) Y-h Lee (China) Q Ye	5	3

Semifinals
WC	(Czech Republic) A Kovačková (Czech Republic) J Kovačková	6	3	[3]
4	(United Kingdom) H Dart (United Kingdom) M Lumsden	3	6	[10]
3	(Chinese Taipei) H-c Chan (Japan) M Kato	7	3	[9]
(Czech Republic) L Havlíčková (Czech Republic) L Samson	5	6	[11]

Finals
4	(United Kingdom) H Dart (United Kingdom) M Lumsden	6	6
(Czech Republic) L Havlíčková (Czech Republic) L Samson	4	4
