= 2026 Prague Open – Singles =

Singles
- 2026 Prague Open

Final
- Champion: (Austria) Lilli Tagger
- Runner-up: (Ukraine) Daria Snigur
- Score: 7–6^{(7–3)}, 6–2
- Date: 26 July 2026

Details
- Draw: 32 (6Q / 4WC)
- Seeds: 8

Events
Singles	Doubles
- WTA Prague Open

Lilli Tagger defeated Daria Snigur in the final, 7–6^{(7–3)}, 6–2 to win the singles tennis title at the 2026 Prague Open. It was her first WTA Tour singles title and she became the first player born in 2008 to win a tour-level singles title.

Marie Bouzková was the defending champion, but lost in the quarterfinals to Tereza Valentová.

== Seeds ==
1. (Czech Republic) Marie Bouzková (quarterfinals)
2. (Czech Republic) Barbora Krejčíková (semifinals)
3. (Czech Republic) Sára Bejlek (quarterfinals)
4. (Czech Republic) Nikola Bartůňková (second round)
5. (Czech Republic) Tereza Valentová (semifinals)
6. (Croatia) Antonia Ružić (first round)
7. (France) Diane Parry (first round)
8. (Ukraine) Daria Snigur (final)

== Draw ==
Key

- Q = Qualifier
- WC = Wild card
- LL = Lucky loser
- Alt = Alternate
- ITF = ITF entry
- PR = Protected ranking
- SR = Special ranking
- SE = Special exempt
- JE = Junior exempt
- JR = Junior Accelerator Programme entrant
- CO = College Accelerator Programme entrant
- NG = Next Gen Accelerator Program entrant
- w/o = Walkover
- r = Retired
- d = Defaulted

=== Finals ===
Semifinals
5	(Czech Republic) Tereza Valentová	6^{4}	3
8	(Ukraine) Daria Snigur	7^{7}	6
(Austria) Lilli Tagger	6^{5}	6	7^{7}
2	(Czech Republic) Barbora Krejčíková	7^{7}	3	6^{4}

Final
8	(Ukraine) Daria Snigur	6^{3}	2
(Austria) Lilli Tagger	7^{7}	6

=== Top half ===
First round
1	(Czech Republic) M Bouzková	7	7
(Spain) J Bouzas Maneiro	5	5
Q	(Ukraine) V Podrez	1	7	2
Q	(United States) CYS Lee	6	5	6
WC	(Czech Republic) L Samson	4	6	2
(Australia) M Joint	6	3	6
LL	(Australia) P Hon	3	1
5	(Czech Republic) T Valentová	6	6
4	(Czech Republic) N Bartůňková	3	6	6
(China) Y Yuan	6	4	1
WC	(Czech Republic) J Kovačková	3	7	2
(Thailand) L Tararudee	6	5	6
LL	(Turkey) A Aksu	2	6	6
Q	(Belgium) S Costoulas	6	3	4
(Germany) E Seidel	5	6	3
8	(Ukraine) D Snigur	7	3	6

Second round
1	(Czech Republic) M Bouzková	7	6
Q	(United States) CYS Lee	5	4
(Australia) M Joint	6	0	3
5	(Czech Republic) T Valentová	1	6	6
4	(Czech Republic) N Bartůňková	6^{4}	6	6^{6}
(Thailand) L Tararudee	7^{7}	3	7^{8}
LL	(Turkey) A Aksu	3	2
8	(Ukraine) D Snigur	6	6

Quarterfinals
1	(Czech Republic) M Bouzková	6	4	6^{6}
5	(Czech Republic) T Valentová	2	6	7^{8}
(Thailand) L Tararudee	0	3
8	(Ukraine) D Snigur	6	6

Semifinals
5	(Czech Republic) T Valentová	6^{4}	3
8	(Ukraine) D Snigur	7^{7}	6

=== Bottom half ===
First round
7	(France) D Parry	4	0
Q	(Japan) M Hontama	6	6
Q	(China) X Gao	2	4
(Austria) L Tagger	6	6
(Uzbekistan) M Timofeeva	6	6
A Sasnovich	3	4
A Blinkova	6^{9}	6	1
3	(Czech Republic) S Bejlek	7^{11}	3	6
6	(Croatia) A Ružić	6^{2}	4
Q	(Czech Republic) D Šalková	7^{7}	6
WC	(Czech Republic) A Oktiabreva	3	3
PR	(France) O Dodin	6	6
(United States) A Parks	2	4
WC	(Czech Republic) L Havlíčková	6	6
LL	(Czech Republic) L Fruhvirtová	2	4
2	(Czech Republic) B Krejčíková	6	6

Second round
Q	(Japan) M Hontama	4	4
(Austria) L Tagger	6	6
(Uzbekistan) M Timofeeva	1	1
3	(Czech Republic) S Bejlek	6	6
Q	(Czech Republic) D Šalková	6	6
PR	(France) O Dodin	1	1
WC	(Czech Republic) L Havlíčková	4	2
2	(Czech Republic) B Krejčíková	6	6

Quarterfinals
(Austria) L Tagger	6	6
3	(Czech Republic) S Bejlek	3	4
Q	(Czech Republic) D Šalková	3	3
2	(Czech Republic) B Krejčíková	6	6

Semifinals
(Austria) L Tagger	6^{5}	6	7^{7}
2	(Czech Republic) B Krejčíková	7^{7}	3	6^{4}

== Qualifying ==
=== Seeds ===
1. (Czech Republic) Dominika Šalková (qualified)
2. (Ukraine) Veronika Podrez (qualified)
3. (Belgium) Sofia Costoulas (qualified)
4. (Australia) Priscilla Hon (qualifying competition, lucky loser)
5. (Switzerland) Susan Bandecchi (first round)
6. (Switzerland) Rebeka Masarova (first round, retired)
7. (United States) Carol Young Suh Lee (qualified)
8. (Czech Republic) Linda Fruhvirtová (qualifying competition, lucky loser)
9. (France) Harmony Tan (withdrew)
10. (Japan) Mai Hontama (qualified)
11. (Turkey) Ayla Aksu (qualifying competition, lucky loser)
12. (Czech Republic) Gabriela Knutson (qualifying competition)

=== Qualifiers ===
1. (Czech Republic) Dominika Šalková
2. (Ukraine) Veronika Podrez
3. (Belgium) Sofia Costoulas
4. (United States) Carol Young Suh Lee
5. (China) Gao Xinyu
6. (Japan) Mai Hontama

=== Lucky losers ===
1. (Czech Republic) Linda Fruhvirtová
2. (Turkey) Ayla Aksu
3. (Australia) Priscilla Hon

=== Qualifying draw ===
==== First qualifier ====
First round
1	(Czech Republic) Dominika Šalková	6	6
WC	(Czech Republic) Denisa Žoldáková	4	4
(Japan) Aoi Ito	4	4
12	(Czech Republic) Gabriela Knutson	6	6

Qualifying competition
1	(Czech Republic) Dominika Šalková	6	6
12	(Czech Republic) Gabriela Knutson	2	3

==== Second qualifier ====
First round
2	(Ukraine) Veronika Podrez	3	6	6
WC	(Czech Republic) Tereza Krejčová	6	2	1
WC	(Czech Republic) Victoria Bervid	1	2
Alt	(Japan) Rina Saigo	6	6

Qualifying competition
2	(Ukraine) Veronika Podrez	6	6
Alt	(Japan) Rina Saigo	4	1

==== Third qualifier ====
First round
3	(Belgium) Sofia Costoulas	6^{4}	7	6
(Japan) Nao Hibino	7^{7}	5	4
(Slovakia) Viktória Morvayová	3	3
11	(Turkey) Ayla Aksu	6	6

Qualifying competition
3	(Belgium) Sofia Costoulas	7	6
11	(Turkey) Ayla Aksu	5	2

==== Fourth qualifier ====
First round
4	(Australia) Priscilla Hon	6	0
PR	(India) Karman Thandi	3	0^{r}
(Japan) Kyōka Okamura	5	1
7	(United States) Carol Young Suh Lee	7	6

Qualifying competition
4	(Australia) Priscilla Hon	5	3
7	(United States) Carol Young Suh Lee	7	6

==== Fifth qualifier ====
First round
5	(Switzerland) Susan Bandecchi	5	3
(China) Gao Xinyu	7	6
(Australia) Elena Micic	3	5
8	(Czech Republic) Linda Fruhvirtová	6	7

Qualifying competition
(China) Gao Xinyu	6	0	6
8	(Czech Republic) Linda Fruhvirtová	2	6	3

==== Sixth qualifier ====
First round
6	(Switzerland) Rebeka Masarova	6	3^{r}
(Switzerland) Valentina Ryser	4	4
(Czech Republic) Barbora Palicová	3	3
10	(Japan) Mai Hontama	6	6

Qualifying competition
(Switzerland) Valentina Ryser	2	2
10	(Japan) Mai Hontama	6	6
