= 2026 Athens Open – Singles =

Singles
- 2026 Athens Open

Final
- Champion: (Czech Republic) Barbora Krejčíková
- Runner-up: (Greece) Maria Sakkari
- Score: 7–6^{(7–5)}, 6–3

Details
- Draw: 32 (6 Q / 4 WC)
- Seeds: 8

Events
Singles	Doubles
- Athens Open

Barbora Krejčíková defeated Maria Sakkari in the final, 7–6^{(7–5)}, 6–3 to win the inaugural singles tennis title at the 2026 Athens Open. It was her ninth WTA Tour singles title, and first in over two years.

== Seeds ==
1. (Denmark) Clara Tauson (semifinals)
2. (United States) Ann Li (second round)
3. (Czech Republic) Barbora Krejčíková (champion)
4. (Greece) Maria Sakkari (final)
5. (Czech Republic) Sára Bejlek (quarterfinals)
6. (Spain) Jéssica Bouzas Maneiro (first round)
7. (Czech Republic) Tereza Valentová (quarterfinals)
8. (Poland) Magda Linette (first round)

== Draw ==
Key

- Q = Qualifier
- WC = Wild card
- LL = Lucky loser
- Alt = Alternate
- ITF = ITF entry
- PR = Protected ranking
- SR = Special ranking
- SE = Special exempt
- JE = Junior exempt
- JR = Junior Accelerator Programme entrant
- CO = College Accelerator Programme entrant
- NG = Next Gen Accelerator Program entrant
- w/o = Walkover
- r = Retired
- d = Defaulted

=== Finals ===
Semifinals
1	(Denmark) Clara Tauson	1	6	3
3	(Czech Republic) Barbora Krejčíková	6	4	6
4	(Greece) Maria Sakkari	6	7
Alina Korneeva	1	5

Final
3	(Czech Republic) Barbora Krejčíková	7^{7}	6
4	(Greece) Maria Sakkari	6^{5}	3

=== Top half ===
First round
1	(Denmark) C Tauson	7	6
Q	(Japan) N Hibino	5	4
WC	(Greece) S Sakellaridi	6^{2}	7	2
LL	(Italy) M Tona	7^{7}	5	6
WC	(Greece) M Argyrokastriti	1	1
Q	(Austria) L Tagger	6	6
Q	(Slovakia) V Morvayová	0	5
5	(Czech Republic) S Bejlek	6	7
3	(Czech Republic) B Krejčíková	6	6
(Bulgaria) V Tomova	3	3
(France) C Monnet	4	6	7^{12}
(Switzerland) R Masarova	6	2	6^{10}
WC	(Greece) M Matoula	5	3
Q	(Australia) E Micic	7	6
(China) Q Zheng	7	6
6	(Spain) J Bouzas Maneiro	5	1

Second round
1	(Denmark) C Tauson	6	6
LL	(Italy) M Tona	4	0
Q	(Austria) L Tagger	2	2
5	(Czech Republic) S Bejlek	6	6
3	(Czech Republic) B Krejčíková	6	6
(France) C Monnet	0	2
Q	(Australia) E Micic	4	1
(China) Q Zheng	6	6

Quarterfinals
1	(Denmark) C Tauson	6	6
5	(Czech Republic) S Bejlek	2	3
3	(Czech Republic) B Krejčíková	6	6
(China) Q Zheng	4	4

Semifinals
1	(Denmark) C Tauson	1	6	3
3	(Czech Republic) B Krejčíková	6	4	6

=== Bottom half ===
First round
8	(Poland) M Linette	4	5
(Japan) M Hontama	6	7
WC	(Greece) V Grammatikopoulou	6^{3}	4
(United States) A Parks	7^{7}	6
Q	(Germany) M Hodzic	3	6	6^{4}
(United Kingdom) H Dart	6	3	7^{7}
(Uzbekistan) P Kudermetova	0	6^{1}
4	(Greece) M Sakkari	6	7^{7}
7	(Czech Republic) T Valentová	6	6
(Belgium) S Costoulas	1	2
A Blinkova	6	2	2
A Sasnovich	3	6	6
Q	(Japan) A Ito	2	1
A Korneeva	6	6
(Uzbekistan) M Timofeeva	2	1
2	(United States) A Li	6	6

Second round
(Japan) M Hontama	7^{7}	2	5
(United States) A Parks	6^{4}	6	7
(United Kingdom) H Dart	1	2
4	(Greece) M Sakkari	6	6
7	(Czech Republic) T Valentová	6	6
A Sasnovich	3	2
A Korneeva	6	6
2	(United States) A Li	2	2

Quarterfinals
(United States) A Parks	4	3
4	(Greece) M Sakkari	6	6
7	(Czech Republic) T Valentová	5	3
A Korneeva	7	6

Semifinals
4	(Greece) M Sakkari	6	7
A Korneeva	1	5

== Qualifying ==
=== Seeds ===
The top three seeds received a bye into the qualifying competition.

1. (Austria) Lilli Tagger (qualified)
2. (Japan) Aoi Ito (qualified)
3. (Japan) Nao Hibino (qualified)
4. (Slovakia) Viktória Morvayová (qualified)
5. (Australia) Elena Micic (qualified)
6. (Germany) Mina Hodzic (qualified)
7. (Italy) Miriana Tona (qualifying competition, lucky loser)
8. (France) Yasmine Mansouri (qualifying competition)
9. (United States) Madison Sieg (qualifying competition)
10. (Finland) Anastasia Kulikova (qualifying competition)
11. Elina Nepliy (qualifying competition)
12. (Israel) Lina Glushko (first round)

=== Qualifiers ===
1. (Austria) Lilli Tagger
2. (Japan) Aoi Ito
3. (Japan) Nao Hibino
4. (Slovakia) Viktória Morvayová
5. (Australia) Elena Micic
6. (Germany) Mina Hodzic

=== Lucky loser ===
1. (Italy) Miriana Tona

=== Qualifying draw ===
==== First qualifier ====
First round				Qualifying competition
				1	(Austria) Lilli Tagger	6	6
				9	(United States) Madison Sieg	0	3
WC	(Greece) Artemis Aslanasvili	3	0	9	(United States) Madison Sieg	0	3
9	(United States) Madison Sieg	6	6

==== Second qualifier ====
First round				Qualifying competition
				2	(Japan) Aoi Ito	6	6
				8	(France) Yasmine Mansouri	4	0
WC	(Greece) Eleni Tsetsou	5	6^{4}	8	(France) Yasmine Mansouri	4	0
8	(France) Yasmine Mansouri	7	7^{7}

==== Third qualifier ====
First round				Qualifying competition
				3	(Japan) Nao Hibino	6	6
				7	(Italy) Miriana Tona	4	0
WC	(Greece) Maria Rentoumi	1	1	7	(Italy) Miriana Tona	4	0
7	(Italy) Miriana Tona	6	6

==== Fourth qualifier ====
First round
4	(Slovakia) Viktória Morvayová	6	6
(Germany) Franziska Sziedat	2	1
WC	(China) Tang Qianhui	6	4	4
11	Elina Nepliy	2	6	6

Qualifying competition
4	(Slovakia) Viktória Morvayová	6	6
11	Elina Nepliy	4	1

==== Fifth qualifier ====
First round
5	(Australia) Elena Micic	6	6
WC	(Japan) Makoto Ninomiya	0	2
WC	(Greece) Alexandra Panagiotidou	1	1
10	(Finland) Anastasia Kulikova	6	6

Qualifying competition
5	(Australia) Elena Micic	6	3	6
10	(Finland) Anastasia Kulikova	3	6	4

==== Sixth qualifier ====
First round
6	(Germany) Mina Hodzic	6	6
(Chinese Taipei) Chan Hao-ching	3	4
Ekaterina Yashina	3	6	7
12	(Israel) Lina Glushko	6	3	5

Qualifying competition
6	(Germany) Mina Hodzic	6	6
Ekaterina Yashina	1	2
