= 2023 Open de Rouen – Doubles =

Doubles
- 2023 Open de Rouen

Final
- Champions: (United Kingdom) Maia Lumsden (France) Jessika Ponchet
- Runners-up: (Hungary) Anna Bondár (Belgium) Kimberley Zimmermann
- Score: 6–3, 7–6^{(7–4)}

Events
Singles	Doubles
← 2022 ·	Open de Rouen	· 2024 →

Maia Lumsden and Jessika Ponchet won the title, defeating Anna Bondár and Kimberley Zimmermann in the final, 6–3, 7–6^{(7–4)}.

Natela Dzalamidze and Kamilla Rakhimova were the reigning champions, but Rakhimova chose to compete in Hong Kong instead. Dzalamidze partnered Aliona Bolsova but lost in the semifinals to Lumsden and Ponchet.

== Seeds ==
1. (Hungary) Anna Bondár / (Belgium) Kimberley Zimmermann (final)
2. Alena Fomina-Klotz / Iryna Shymanovich (quarterfinals)
3. (United Kingdom) Alicia Barnett / (United Kingdom) Olivia Nicholls (semifinals)
4. (Spain) Aliona Bolsova / (Georgia (country)) Natela Dzalamidze (semifinals)

== Draw ==
=== Key ===
- Q = Qualifier
- WC = Wild card
- LL = Lucky loser
- Alt = Alternate
- ITF = ITF entry
- PR = Protected ranking
- SR = Special ranking
- SE = Special exempt
- JE = Junior exempt
- JR = Junior Accelerator Programme entrant
- CO = College Accelerator Programme entrant
- NG = Next Gen Accelerator Program entrant
- w/o = Walkover
- r = Retired
- d = Defaulted

=== Draw ===
First round
1	(Hungary) A Bondár (Belgium) K Zimmermann	6	6
(United Kingdom) Y Miyazaki (United Kingdom) E Webley-Smith	3	1
(United Kingdom) F Christie (Colombia) Y Lizarazo	6^{4}	6	[10]
(United Kingdom) E Appleton (Czech Republic) A Sisková	7^{7}	2	[7]
3	(United Kingdom) A Barnett (United Kingdom) O Nicholls	6	6
WC	(France) L Jeanjean (France) T Lemaître	2	3
(France) F Ferro (France) A Robbe	7^{7}	2	[7]
(Switzerland) C Naef (Switzerland) J Teichmann	6^{5}	6	[10]
(Czech Republic) D Hindová (Czech Republic) K Kubáňová	5	4
(Spain) M Bassols Ribera (Spain) N Párrizas Díaz	7	6
(United Kingdom) A Collins (Venezuela) A Gámiz	3	4
4	(Spain) A Bolsova (Georgia (country)) N Dzalamidze	6	6
(United Kingdom) M Lumsden (France) J Ponchet	6	6
(France) E Jacquemot (France) M Rouvroy	3	2
(Germany) T Morderger (Germany) Y Morderger	3	5
2	A Fomina-Klotz; I Shymanovich	6	7

Quarterfinals
1	(Hungary) A Bondár (Belgium) K Zimmermann	6	6
(United Kingdom) F Christie (Colombia) Y Lizarazo	3	3
3	(United Kingdom) A Barnett (United Kingdom) O Nicholls	3	6	[10]
(Switzerland) C Naef (Switzerland) J Teichmann	6	4	[4]
(Spain) M Bassols Ribera (Spain) N Párrizas Díaz
4	(Spain) A Bolsova (Georgia (country)) N Dzalamidze	w/o
(United Kingdom) M Lumsden (France) J Ponchet	6	7
2	A Fomina-Klotz; I Shymanovich	3	5

Semifinals
1	(Hungary) A Bondár (Belgium) K Zimmermann	6	6^{6}	[10]
3	(United Kingdom) A Barnett (United Kingdom) O Nicholls	4	7^{8}	[1]
4	(Spain) A Bolsova (Georgia (country)) N Dzalamidze	2	0
(United Kingdom) M Lumsden (France) J Ponchet	6	6

Final
1	(Hungary) A Bondár (Belgium) K Zimmermann	3	6^{4}
(United Kingdom) M Lumsden (France) J Ponchet	6	7^{7}
