= Athens Open (WTA) =

WTA Tour
- Event name: Vanda Pharmaceuticals Athens Open
- Founded: 2026
- Editions: 1
- Location: Athens; Greece
- Venue: Athens Olympic Tennis Centre, Stadion Sports Center
- Category: WTA 250
- Surface: Hard
- Draw: 32S / 24Q / 16D
- Prize money: €246,388

Current champions (2026)
- Singles: (Czech Republic) Barbora Krejčíková
- Doubles: (Chinese Taipei) Chan Hao-ching (Japan) Miyu Kato

The Athens Open, sponsored by Vanda Pharmaceuticals, is a professional WTA 250 women's tennis tournament on the WTA Tour, played on outdoor hardcourts at the Athens Olympic Tennis Centre in Athens, Greece. This event marked the end of a hiatus of over 35 years without WTA events in Greece and was the first one held in the city of Athens since 1990, when the Athens Trophy was last played. It replaced the Jiangxi Open on the WTA calendar.

== Past finals ==
=== Singles ===
Year	Champion	Runner-up	Score
2026	(Czech Republic) Barbora Krejčíková	(Greece) Maria Sakkari	7–6^{(7–5)}, 6–3

=== Doubles ===
Year	Champions	Runners-up	Score
2026	(Chinese Taipei) Chan Hao-ching (Japan) Miyu Kato	(United Kingdom) Maia Lumsden (China) Tang Qianhui	7–6^{(7–3)}, 4–6, [10–7]

== See also ==
- Athens Trophy – women's tournament (1986–1990)
- ATP Athens Open – men's tournament (1986–1994)
- Hellenic Championship, held in Athens – ATP 250 tournament (2025)
