= 2022 Open de Rouen =

- Date: 17–23 October
- Edition: 1st
- Category: WTA 125
- Draw: 32S / 16D
- Prize money: $115,000
- Surface: Hard (indoor)
- Location: Rouen, France
- Venue: Kindarena

Champions

Singles
- (Belgium) Maryna Zanevska

Doubles
- (Georgia (country)) Natela Dzalamidze / Kamilla Rakhimova
- Open de Rouen

The 2022 Open de Rouen (also known as the Open Capfinances Rouen Métropole for sponsorship reasons) was a professional tennis tournament played on indoor hard courts. It was the first edition of the tournament and part of the 2022 WTA 125 tournaments, offering a total of $115,000 in prize money. It took place at the Kindarena Sports Complex in Rouen, France between 17 and 23 October 2022.

== Champions ==
=== Singles ===
- (Belgium) Maryna Zanevska def. (Switzerland) Viktorija Golubic 7–6^{(8–6)}, 6–1

=== Doubles ===
- (Georgia (country)) Natela Dzalamidze / Kamilla Rakhimova def. (Japan) Misaki Doi / (Georgia (country)) Oksana Kalashnikova 6–2, 7–5

== Singles entrants ==
=== Seeds ===
Country	Player	Rank^{1}	Seed
~~CHN~~	~~Wang Xiyu~~	~~59~~	~~1~~
FRA	Diane Parry	61	2
ITA	Lucia Bronzetti	63	3
~~ITA~~	~~Jasmine Paolini~~	~~78~~	~~4~~
SUI	Viktorija Golubic	81	5
ROU	Jaqueline Cristian	83	6
BEL	Maryna Zanevska	84	7
HUN	Dalma Gálfi	89	8
GBR	Harriet Dart	90	9
BUL	Viktoriya Tomova	93	10

- ^{1} Rankings are as of 10 October 2022.

=== Other entrants ===
The following players received a wildcard into the singles main draw:

- (France) Elsa Jacquemot
- (France) Léolia Jeanjean
- (France) Kristina Mladenovic
- (France) Alice Robbe

The following players received entry into the main draw through qualification:

- (Serbia) Olga Danilović
- ~~Anastasia Gasanova~~
- (United States) Caty McNally
- (France) Jessika Ponchet

The following players received entry as lucky losers:

- Erika Andreeva
- (Croatia) Ana Konjuh

=== Withdrawals ===
Before the tournament

- Anastasia Gasanova → replaced by Erika Andreeva
- (Slovenia) Kaja Juvan → replaced by (Ukraine) Daria Snigur
- (Germany) Jule Niemeier → replaced by (Germany) Tamara Korpatsch
- (Italy) Jasmine Paolini → replaced by Kamilla Rakhimova
- (Spain) Nuria Párrizas Díaz → replaced by (France) Harmony Tan
- (Spain) Sara Sorribes Tormo → replaced by (Italy) Sara Errani
- (Denmark) Clara Tauson → replaced by Vitalia Diatchenko
- (China) Wang Xinyu → replaced by (Switzerland) Simona Waltert
- (China) Wang Xiyu → replaced by (Croatia) Ana Konjuh

== Doubles entrants ==
=== Seeds ===
Country	Player	Country	Player	Rank^{1}	Seed
GEO	Natela Dzalamidze		Kamilla Rakhimova	132	1
JPN	Misaki Doi	GEO	Oksana Kalashnikova	190	2
SUI	Viktorija Golubic	CHN	Han Xinyun	194	3
GBR	Harriet Dart	HUN	Dalma Gálfi	232	4

- ^{1} Rankings as of 10 October 2022.

=== Other entrants ===
The following pair received a wildcard into the doubles main draw:

- (France) Audrey Albié / (France) Alice Robbe
