= 2026 Athens Open – Doubles =

Doubles
- 2026 Athens Open

Final
- Champions: (Chinese Taipei) Chan Hao-ching (Japan) Miyu Kato
- Runners-up: (United Kingdom) Maia Lumsden (China) Tang Qianhui
- Score: 7–6^{7–3}, 4–6, [10–7]

Details
- Draw: 16 (2 WC)
- Seeds: 4

Events
Singles	Doubles
- Athens Open

Chan Hao-ching and Miyu Kato defeated Maia Lumsden and Tang Qianhui in the final, 7–6^{(7–3)}, 4–6, [10–7] to win the inaugural doubles tennis title at the 2026 Athens Open.

== Seeds ==
1. (Chinese Taipei) Chan Hao-ching / (Japan) Miyu Kato (champions)
2. (China) Jiang Xinyu / (Chinese Taipei) Wu Fang-hsien (semifinals)
3. (Hong Kong) Eudice Chong / (Poland) Katarzyna Piter (semifinals)
4. (United Kingdom) Maia Lumsden / (China) Tang Qianhui (final)

== Draw ==
Key

- Q = Qualifier
- WC = Wild card
- LL = Lucky loser
- Alt = Alternate
- ITF = ITF entry
- PR = Protected ranking
- SR = Special ranking
- SE = Special exempt
- JE = Junior exempt
- JR = Junior Accelerator Programme entrant
- CO = College Accelerator Programme entrant
- NG = Next Gen Accelerator Program entrant
- w/o = Walkover
- r = Retired
- d = Defaulted

=== Draw ===
First round
1	(Chinese Taipei) H-c Chan (Japan) M Kato	6	6
WC	(Greece) M Argyrokastriti; E Nepliy	3	2
A Korneeva (Uzbekistan) P Kudermetova	6	7^{7}
(Brazil) I Martins (Japan) M Ninomiya	4	6^{4}
3	(Hong Kong) E Chong (Poland) K Piter	6	6
(Uzbekistan) M Timofeeva; E Yashina	4	3
(United Kingdom) M Brooks (Netherlands) I Haverlag	4	6	[10]
(Japan) M Kobori (Thailand) P Plipuech	6	4	[7]
(United States) C Harrison (Estonia) I Neel	3	6	[11]
WC	(Greece) V Grammatikopoulou (Greece) M Matoula	6	2	[9]
(United States) C Corley (Australia) A Osborne	4	2
4	(United Kingdom) M Lumsden (China) Q Tang	6	6
(Chinese Taipei) Y-h Lee (China) Q Ye	4	2
(France) C Monnet (Greece) S Sakellaridi	6	6
(United States) R McAdoo (United States) A Smith	6	2	[5]
2	(China) X Jiang (Chinese Taipei) F-h Wu	4	6	[10]

Quarterfinals
1	(Chinese Taipei) H-c Chan (Japan) M Kato	6	6^{5}	[10]
A Korneeva (Uzbekistan) P Kudermetova	3	7^{7}	[3]
3	(Hong Kong) E Chong (Poland) K Piter	6	7^{7}
(United Kingdom) M Brooks (Netherlands) I Haverlag	2	6^{3}
(United States) C Harrison (Estonia) I Neel	2	7	[5]
4	(United Kingdom) M Lumsden (China) Q Tang	6	5	[10]
(France) C Monnet (Greece) S Sakellaridi	5	3
2	(China) X Jiang (Chinese Taipei) F-h Wu	7	6

Semifinals
1	(Chinese Taipei) H-c Chan (Japan) M Kato	6	3	[10]
3	(Hong Kong) E Chong (Poland) K Piter	3	6	[5]
4	(United Kingdom) M Lumsden (China) Q Tang	6	4	[10]
2	(China) X Jiang (Chinese Taipei) F-h Wu	3	6	[7]

Final
1	(Chinese Taipei) H-c Chan (Japan) M Kato	7^{7}	4	[10]
4	(United Kingdom) M Lumsden (China) Q Tang	6^{3}	6	[7]
