= 2023 Open de Rouen – Singles =

Singles
- 2023 Open de Rouen

Final
- Champion: (Switzerland) Viktorija Golubic
- Runner-up: Erika Andreeva
- Score: 6–4, 6–1

Details
- Draw: 32 (4 WC)
- Seeds: 8

Events
Singles	Doubles
← 2022 ·	Open de Rouen	· 2024 →

Viktorija Golubic won the singles title at the 2023 Open de Rouen, defeating Erika Andreeva in the final, 6–4, 6–1.

Maryna Zanevska was the reigning champion, but she retired from professional tennis in August 2023.

== Seeds ==
1. (Belgium) Greet Minnen (quarterfinals)
2. (France) Clara Burel (first round)
3. (Ukraine) Kateryna Baindl (withdrew)
4. (United Kingdom) Jodie Burrage (quarterfinals)
5. (France) Alizé Cornet (semifinals)
6. (Bulgaria) Viktoriya Tomova (first round)
7. (Romania) Jaqueline Cristian (semifinals)
8. (Hungary) Anna Bondár (first round)
9. (Switzerland) Viktorija Golubic (champion)

== Draw ==
=== Key ===
- Q = Qualifier
- WC = Wild card
- LL = Lucky loser
- Alt = Alternate
- ITF = ITF entry
- PR = Protected ranking
- SR = Special ranking
- SE = Special exempt
- JE = Junior exempt
- JR = Junior Accelerator Programme entrant
- CO = College Accelerator Programme entrant
- NG = Next Gen Accelerator Program entrant
- w/o = Walkover
- r = Retired
- d = Defaulted

=== Finals ===
Semifinals
7	(Romania) Jaqueline Cristian	5	4
9	(Switzerland) Viktorija Golubic	7	6
Q	Erika Andreeva	6	6
5	(France) Alizé Cornet	3	1

Final
9	(Switzerland) Viktorija Golubic	6	6
Q	Erika Andreeva	4	1

=== Top half ===
First round
1	(Belgium) G Minnen	6	6
(United Kingdom) Y Miyazaki	4	4
(Switzerland) S Waltert	6	5	6
WC	(France) C Paquet	0	7	2
(France) L Jeanjean	3	3
(Switzerland) C Naef	6	6
(Italy) L Stefanini	6^{5}	1
7	(Romania) J Cristian	7^{7}	6
9	(Switzerland) V Golubic	3	6	6
WC	(France) E Jacquemot	6	3	1
Q	(France) M Rouvroy	6	5	4
Q	(France) T Lemaître	3	7	6
(Spain) A Bolsova	6	6
LL	I Shymanovich	4	4
WC	(France) F Ferro	6	2	6
6	(Bulgaria) V Tomova	2	6	3

Second round
1	(Belgium) G Minnen	6	6
(Switzerland) S Waltert	2	3
(Switzerland) C Naef	4	6	3
7	(Romania) J Cristian	6	4	6
9	(Switzerland) V Golubic	6	6
Q	(France) T Lemaître	0	2
(Spain) A Bolsova	6^{6}	6	3
WC	(France) F Ferro	7^{8}	3	6

Quarterfinals
1	(Belgium) G Minnen	4	3
7	(Romania) J Cristian	6	6
9	(Switzerland) V Golubic	6	6
WC	(France) F Ferro	3	2

Semifinals
7	(Romania) J Cristian	5	4
9	(Switzerland) V Golubic	7	6

=== Bottom half ===
First round
8	(Hungary) A Bondár	3	7^{7}	4
(France) O Dodin	6	6^{5}	6
(Switzerland) J Teichmann	6	3	6^{5}
Q	E Andreeva	4	6	7^{7}
(Germany) A-L Friedsam	4	1
WC	(France) A Robbe	6	6
(Ukraine) D Snigur	3	3
4	(United Kingdom) J Burrage	6	6
5	(France) A Cornet	7	3	6
(France) J Ponchet	5	6	4
(Hungary) D Gálfi	6^{7}	6	6
(Estonia) K Kanepi	7^{9}	1	4
(Spain) N Párrizas Díaz	6	6
Q	(Australia) A Sharma	4	3
(Spain) M Bassols Ribera	7	6
2	(France) C Burel	5	4

Second round
(France) O Dodin	3	1
Q	E Andreeva	6	6
WC	(France) A Robbe	1	3
4	(United Kingdom) J Burrage	6	6
5	(France) A Cornet	6	6
(Hungary) D Gálfi	4	3
(Spain) N Párrizas Díaz	7^{8}	4	6
(Spain) M Bassols Ribera	6^{6}	6	2

Quarterfinals
Q	E Andreeva	6	6
4	(United Kingdom) J Burrage	4	2
5	(France) A Cornet	1	6	7
(Spain) N Párrizas Díaz	6	4	5

Semifinals
Q	E Andreeva	6	6
5	(France) A Cornet	3	1

== Qualifying ==
=== Seeds ===
1. Iryna Shymanovich (qualifying competition, lucky loser)
2. (Australia) Astra Sharma (qualified)
3. (Germany) Noma Noha Akugue (qualifying competition)
4. Erika Andreeva (qualified)

=== Qualifiers ===
1. (France) Margaux Rouvroy
2. (Australia) Astra Sharma
3. (France) Tiphanie Lemaître
4. Erika Andreeva

=== Lucky loser ===
1. Iryna Shymanovich

=== Draw ===
==== First qualifier ====
Qualifying competition
1	Iryna Shymanovich	6^{3}	3
WC	(France) Margaux Rouvroy	7^{7}	6

==== Second qualifier ====
Qualifying competition
2	(Australia) Astra Sharma	6	6
	Anna Sisková	3	1

==== Third qualifier ====
Qualifying competition
3	(Germany) Noma Noha Akugue	5	5
WC	(France) Tiphanie Lemaître	7	7

==== Fourth qualifier ====
Qualifying competition
4	Erika Andreeva	6	6
	(Belgium) Magali Kempen	1	4
