= 2026 Open de Rouen – Singles =

Singles
- 2026 Open de Rouen

Final
- Champion: (Ukraine) Marta Kostyuk
- Runner-up: (Ukraine) Veronika Podrez
- Score: 6–3, 6–4

Details
- Draw: 32 (4 WC / 6 Q)
- Seeds: 8

Events
Singles	Doubles
- Open de Rouen

Marta Kostyuk defeated Veronika Podrez in the final, 6–3, 6–4 to win the singles tennis title at the 2026 Open de Rouen. It was her second WTA Tour singles title, and first since 2023. The final marked the first all-Ukrainian final on the WTA Tour in the Open Era.

Elina Svitolina was the reigning champion, but chose to compete in Stuttgart instead.

== Seeds ==
1. (Ukraine) Marta Kostyuk (champion)
2. (Romania) Sorana Cîrstea (semifinals, withdrew)
3. (Romania) Jaqueline Cristian (second round)
4. (United States) Hailey Baptiste (second round)
5. (United States) Ann Li (quarterfinals)
6. (Indonesia) Janice Tjen (withdrew)
7. (Italy) Elisabetta Cocciaretto (second round)
8. (Czech Republic) Markéta Vondroušová (withdrew)
9. (France) Elsa Jacquemot (first round)

== Draw ==
Key

- Q = Qualifier
- WC = Wild card
- LL = Lucky loser
- Alt = Alternate
- ITF = ITF entry
- PR = Protected ranking
- SR = Special ranking
- SE = Special exempt
- JE = Junior exempt
- JR = Junior Accelerator Programme entrant
- CO = College Accelerator Programme entrant
- NG = Next Gen Accelerator Program entrant
- w/o = Walkover
- r = Retired
- d = Defaulted

=== Finals ===
Semifinals
1	(Ukraine) Marta Kostyuk	6	6
(Germany) Tatjana Maria	3	0
Q	(Ukraine) Veronika Podrez	w/o
2	(Romania) Sorana Cîrstea

Final
1	(Ukraine) Marta Kostyuk	6	6
Q	(Ukraine) Veronika Podrez	3	4

=== Top half ===
First round
1	(Ukraine) M Kostyuk	6	6
(France) D Parry	1	4
(United States) C McNally	1	6	6
(United States) K Volynets	6	1	1
(Uzbekistan) K Rakhimova	6	7^{7}
Q	(United States) E Kalieva	3	6^{1}
(Australia) D Kasatkina	7^{8}	2	4
5	(United States) A Li	6^{6}	6	6
4	(United States) H Baptiste	3	7^{8}	6
WC	(France) J Ponchet	6	6^{6}	2
Q	I Shymanovich	6	7
(Czech Republic) L Fruhvirtová	3	5
A Blinkova	5	1
LL	(Czech Republic) D Šalková	7	6
(Germany) T Maria	6	6
9	(France) E Jacquemot	4	3

Second round
1	(Ukraine) M Kostyuk	2	6	6
(United States) C McNally	6	2	1
(Uzbekistan) K Rakhimova	6	2	3
5	(United States) A Li	4	6	6
4	(United States) H Baptiste	3	7	3
Q	I Shymanovich	6	5	6
LL	(Czech Republic) D Šalková	3	2
(Germany) T Maria	6	6

Quarterfinals
1	(Ukraine) M Kostyuk	6	6^{4}	6
5	(United States) A Li	0	7^{7}	3
Q	I Shymanovich	6^{5}	2
(Germany) T Maria	7^{7}	6

Semifinals
1	(Ukraine) M Kostyuk	6	6
(Germany) T Maria	3	0

=== Bottom half ===
First round
7	(Italy) E Cocciaretto	6	4	6
Q	A Charaeva	3	6	2
WC	(United States) S Stephens	2	1
Q	(Ukraine) V Podrez	6	6
LL	(Uzbekistan) M Timofeeva	2	2
(United Kingdom) K Boulter	6	6
WC	(France) T Rakotomanga Rajaonah	6	6^{6}	5
3	(Romania) J Cristian	2	7^{8}	7
LL	(France) H Tan	2	6	0
(Hungary) A Bondár	6	4	6
(Ukraine) O Oliynykova	6	4	6
(Austria) L Tagger	3	6	4
Q	(France) C Paquet	6	4	3
Q	(China) Xin Wang	3	6	6
WC	(France) F Ferro	3	7^{7}	6^{2}
2	(Romania) S Cîrstea	6	6^{5}	7^{7}

Second round
7	(Italy) E Cocciaretto	6^{5}	6	4
Q	(Ukraine) V Podrez	7^{7}	4	6
(United Kingdom) K Boulter	7^{7}	4	6
3	(Romania) J Cristian	6^{5}	6	1
(Hungary) A Bondár	6	4	6
(Ukraine) O Oliynykova	0	6	0
Q	(China) Xin Wang	3^{r}
2	(Romania) S Cîrstea	5

Quarterfinals
Q	(Ukraine) V Podrez	6	6
(United Kingdom) K Boulter	4	1
(Hungary) A Bondár	6^{2}	2
2	(Romania) S Cîrstea	7^{7}	6

Semifinals
Q	(Ukraine) V Podrez	w/o
2	(Romania) S Cîrstea

== Qualifying ==
=== Seeds ===
1. (China) Wang Xinyu (qualified)
2. (Czech Republic) Dominika Šalková (qualifying competition, lucky loser)
3. Alina Charaeva (qualified)
4. (United States) Elvina Kalieva (qualified)
5. (Uzbekistan) Maria Timofeeva (qualifying competition, lucky loser)
6. Iryna Shymanovich (qualified)
7. (France) Harmony Tan (qualifying competition, lucky loser)
8. (Ukraine) Veronika Podrez (qualified)
9. (France) Chloé Paquet (qualified)
10. (France) Julie Belgraver (qualifying competition)
11. (Italy) Jessica Pieri (qualifying competition)
12. (France) Séléna Janicijevic (first round)

=== Qualifiers ===
1. (China) Wang Xinyu
2. (Ukraine) Veronika Podrez
3. Alina Charaeva
4. (United States) Elvina Kalieva
5. (France) Chloé Paquet
6. Iryna Shymanovich

=== Lucky losers ===
1. (Uzbekistan) Maria Timofeeva
2. (Czech Republic) Dominika Šalková
3. (France) Harmony Tan

=== Qualifying draw ===
==== First qualifier ====
First round
1	(China) Wang Xinyu	0	6	6
(France) Manon Léonard	6	3	0
(France) Alice Robbe	3	0
7/WC	(France) Harmony Tan	6	6

Qualifying competition
1	(China) Wang Xinyu	2	6	6
7/WC	(France) Harmony Tan	6	1	3

==== Second qualifier ====
First round
2	(Czech Republic) Dominika Šalková	6	6
(France) Yasmine Mansouri	1	0
(Japan) Momoko Kobori	0	3
8	(Ukraine) Veronika Podrez	6	6

Qualifying competition
2	(Czech Republic) Dominika Šalková	0	4
8	(Ukraine) Veronika Podrez	6	6

==== Third qualifier ====
First round
3	Alina Charaeva	6	6
(Germany) Mina Hodzic	4	4
WC	(France) Océane Babel	4	6	4
11	(Italy) Jessica Pieri	6	4	6

Qualifying competition
3	Alina Charaeva	6	6
11	(Italy) Jessica Pieri	1	1

==== Fourth qualifier ====
First round
4	(United States) Elvina Kalieva	5	6	6
(France) Astrid Lew Yan Foon	7	2	0
Maria Kozyreva	5	3
10/WC	(France) Julie Belgraver	7	6

Qualifying competition
4	(United States) Elvina Kalieva	6	6
10/WC	(France) Julie Belgraver	4	2

==== Fifth qualifier ====
First round
5	(Uzbekistan) Maria Timofeeva	7	6
(France) Yara Bartashevich	5	1
(France) Tiphanie Lemaître	1	0
9	(France) Chloé Paquet	6	6

Qualifying competition
5	(Uzbekistan) Maria Timofeeva	3	6^{5}
9	(France) Chloé Paquet	6	7^{7}

==== Sixth qualifier ====
First round
6	Iryna Shymanovich	6	6
(France) Diana Martynov	4	1
Ekaterina Kazionova	6	6
12	(France) Séléna Janicijevic	1	3

Qualifying competition
6	Iryna Shymanovich	6	6
Ekaterina Kazionova	0	2
