= 2022 Open de Rouen – Singles =

Singles
- 2022 Open de Rouen

Final
- Champion: (Belgium) Maryna Zanevska
- Runner-up: (Switzerland) Viktorija Golubic
- Score: 7–6^{(8–6)}, 6–1

Details
- Draw: 32 (4 WC)
- Seeds: 8

Events
Singles	Doubles
Open de Rouen	· 2023 →

This was the first edition of the tournament.

Maryna Zanevska defeated Viktorija Golubic in the final 7–6^{(8–6)}, 6–1, winning her first singles title at Challenger level.

== Seeds ==
1. (China) Wang Xiyu (withdrew)
2. (France) Diane Parry (first round)
3. (Italy) Lucia Bronzetti (first round)
4. (Italy) Jasmine Paolini (withdrew)
5. (Switzerland) Viktorija Golubic (final)
6. (Romania) Jaqueline Cristian (first round)
7. (Belgium) Maryna Zanevska (champion)
8. (Hungary) Dalma Gálfi (first round)
9. (United Kingdom) Harriet Dart (second round)
10. (Bulgaria) Viktoriya Tomova (second round)

== Draw ==
=== Key ===
- Q = Qualifier
- WC = Wild card
- LL = Lucky loser
- Alt = Alternate
- SE = Special exempt
- PR = Protected ranking
- ITF = ITF entry
- JE = Junior exempt
- w/o = Walkover
- r = Retired
- d = Defaulted
- SR = Special ranking

=== Finals ===
Semifinals
5	(Switzerland) Viktorija Golubic	7^{7}	6
Varvara Gracheva	6^{2}	3
7	(Belgium) Maryna Zanevska	4	7^{7}	6
Alt	Kamilla Rakhimova	6	6^{4}	1

Final
5	(Switzerland) Viktorija Golubic	6^{6}	1
7	(Belgium) Maryna Zanevska	7^{8}	6

=== Top half ===
First Round
9	(United Kingdom) H Dart	7	6
(Ukraine) D Snigur	5	2
(Spain) C Bucșa	6	6
V Diatchenko	4	2
Q	(France) J Ponchet	6	6
WC	(France) A Robbe	1	2
LL	E Andreeva	6^{3}	5
5	(Switzerland) V Golubic	7^{7}	7
10	(Bulgaria) V Tomova	6	6
(Switzerland) S Waltert	3	4
LL	(Croatia) A Konjuh	1	6	6
(Ukraine) D Yastremska	6	1	2
Q	(Serbia) O Danilović	3	0
(Germany) T Korpatsch	6	6
V Gracheva	6	6
8	(Hungary) D Gálfi	0	2

Second Round
9	(United Kingdom) H Dart	4	6	6^{3}
(Spain) C Bucșa	6	2	7^{7}
Q	(France) J Ponchet	6^{4}	3
5	(Switzerland) V Golubic	7^{7}	6
10	(Bulgaria) V Tomova	5	6	5
LL	(Croatia) A Konjuh	7	4	7
(Germany) T Korpatsch	6^{5}	6^{4}
V Gracheva	7^{7}	7^{7}

Quarterfinals
(Spain) C Bucșa	2	3
5	(Switzerland) V Golubic	6	6
LL	(Croatia) A Konjuh	5	3
V Gracheva	7	6

Semifinals
5	(Switzerland) V Golubic	7^{7}	6
V Gracheva	6^{2}	3

=== Bottom half ===
First Round
7	(Belgium) M Zanevska	7	6^{4}	7
(Italy) S Errani	5	7^{7}	5
(France) H Tan	6^{4}	3
WC	(France) E Jacquemot	7^{7}	6
(France) O Dodin	2	3
Q	(United States) C McNally	6	6
(Japan) M Doi	6	6
3	(Italy) L Bronzetti	3	1
6	(Romania) J Cristian	4	3
WC	(France) K Mladenovic	6	6
WC	(France) L Jeanjean	3	6	6
Alt	(Slovakia) AK Schmiedlová	6	0	1
SE	A Blinkova	6^{4}	1
Alt	K Rakhimova	7^{7}	6
(France) C Paquet	6	6^{0}	6
2	(France) D Parry	4	7^{7}	1

Second Round
7	(Belgium) M Zanevska	7^{11}	6
WC	(France) E Jacquemot	6^{9}	4
Q	(United States) C McNally	7	7
(Japan) M Doi	5	5
WC	(France) K Mladenovic	6	1	6
WC	(France) L Jeanjean	3	6	4
Alt	K Rakhimova	7^{7}	2	6
(France) C Paquet	6^{3}	6	4

Quarterfinals
7	(Belgium) M Zanevska	7	2	6
Q	(United States) C McNally	5	6	3
WC	(France) K Mladenovic	1	4
Alt	K Rakhimova	6	6

Semifinals
7	(Belgium) M Zanevska	4	7^{7}	6
Alt	K Rakhimova	6	6^{4}	1

== Qualifying ==
=== Seeds ===
1. (United States) Caty McNally (qualified)
2. Erika Andreeva (qualifying competition, lucky loser)
3. (Croatia) Ana Konjuh (qualifying competition, lucky loser)
4. Anastasia Gasanova (qualified)

=== Qualifiers ===
1. (United States) Caty McNally
2. (Serbia) Olga Danilović
3. (France) Jessika Ponchet
4. Anastasia Gasanova

=== Lucky losers ===
1. (Croatia) Ana Konjuh
2. Erika Andreeva

=== Draw ===
==== First qualifier ====
Qualifying competition
1	(United States) Caty McNally	7^{7}	6
WC	(France) Audrey Albié	6^{3}	3

==== Second qualifier ====
Qualifying competition
2	Erika Andreeva	4	4
PR	(Serbia) Olga Danilović	6	6

==== Third qualifier ====
Qualifying competition
3	(Croatia) Ana Konjuh	6	1	1
	(France) Jessika Ponchet	4	6	6

==== Fourth qualifier ====
Qualifying competition
4	Anastasia Gasanova	6	6
WC	(France) Manon Arcangioli	0	3
