= 2026 Open de Rouen =

- Date: 13–19 April
- Edition: 5th
- Category: WTA 250
- Draw: 32S / 16D
- Prize money: €246,388
- Surface: Clay (indoor)
- Location: Rouen, France
- Venue: Kindarena

Champions

Singles
- (Ukraine) Marta Kostyuk

Doubles
- (Czech Republic) Jesika Malečková / (Czech Republic) Miriam Škoch
- Open de Rouen

The 2026 Open de Rouen (also known as the Open Capfinances Rouen Métropole for sponsorship reasons) was a professional women's tennis tournament played on indoor clay courts. It was the fifth edition of the tournament and part of the WTA 250 tournaments on the 2026 WTA Tour. It took place at the Kindarena Sports Complex in Rouen, France between 13 and 19 April 2026.

== Champions ==
=== Singles ===
- (Ukraine) Marta Kostyuk def. (Ukraine) Veronika Podrez, 6–3, 6–4

=== Doubles ===
- (Czech Republic) Jesika Malečková / (Czech Republic) Miriam Škoch def. (Chinese Taipei) Liang En-shuo / (China) Tang Qianhui, 6–2, 7–5

== Singles main draw entrants ==
=== Seeds ===
Country	Player	Rank^{1}	Seed
UKR	Marta Kostyuk	27	1
ROU	Sorana Cîrstea	29	2
ROU	Jaqueline Cristian	33	3
USA	Hailey Baptiste	35	4
USA	Ann Li	36	5
~~INA~~	~~Janice Tjen~~	~~41~~	~~6~~
ITA	Elisabetta Cocciaretto	42	7
~~CZE~~	~~Markéta Vondroušová~~	~~45~~	~~8~~
FRA	Elsa Jacquemot	59	9

- ^{1} Rankings are as of 6 April 2026.

=== Other entrants ===
The following players received a wildcard into the singles main draw:

- (France) Fiona Ferro
- (France) Jessika Ponchet
- (France) Tiantsoa Rakotomanga Rajaonah
- (United States) Sloane Stephens

The following players received entry from the qualifying draw:

- Alina Charaeva
- (United States) Elvina Kalieva
- (France) Chloé Paquet
- (Ukraine) Veronika Podrez
- Iryna Shymanovich
- (China) Wang Xinyu

The following players received entry as lucky losers:

- (Czech Republic) Dominika Šalková
- (France) Harmony Tan
- (Uzbekistan) Maria Timofeeva

=== Withdrawals ===
- (Czech Republic) Sára Bejlek → replaced by (France) Diane Parry
- (France) Loïs Boisson → replaced by (Uzbekistan) Kamilla Rakhimova
- (Spain) Jéssica Bouzas Maneiro → replaced by Anna Blinkova
- (Czech Republic) Marie Bouzková → replaced by (United States) Katie Volynets
- (France) Varvara Gracheva → replaced by (Ukraine) Oleksandra Oliynykova
- (United States) Sofia Kenin → replaced by (United Kingdom) Katie Boulter
- (United States) McCartney Kessler → replaced by (Czech Republic) Dominika Šalková
- (Colombia) Camila Osorio → replaced by (Austria) Lilli Tagger
- (Argentina) Solana Sierra → replaced by (United States) Caty McNally
- (Indonesia) Janice Tjen → replaced by (France) Harmony Tan
- (Czech Republic) Markéta Vondroušová → replaced by (Uzbekistan) Maria Timofeeva

== Doubles main draw entrants ==
=== Seeds ===
Country	Player	Country	Player	Rank^{1}	Seed
	Irina Khromacheva	MEX	Giuliana Olmos	78	1
	Maria Kozyreva		Iryna Shymanovich	116	2
UKR	Nadiia Kichenok	JPN	Makoto Ninomiya	124	3
CZE	Jesika Malečková	CZE	Miriam Škoch	136	4

- ^{1} Rankings as of 6 April 2026.

=== Other entrants ===
The following pairs received wildcards into the doubles main draw:

- (France) Yara Bartashevich / (France) Marie Mattel
- (France) Elsa Jacquemot / (France) Tiantsoa Rakotomanga Rajaonah
