= 2025 Open de Rouen – Singles =

Singles
- 2025 Open de Rouen

Final
- Champion: (Ukraine) Elina Svitolina
- Runner-up: (Serbia) Olga Danilović
- Score: 6–4, 7–6^{(10–8)}

Details
- Draw: 32 (4 WC)
- Seeds: 8

Events
Singles	Doubles
- Open de Rouen

Elina Svitolina defeated Olga Danilović in the final, 6–4, 7–6^{(10–8)} to win the singles tennis title at the 2025 Open de Rouen. She did not lose a set en route to her 18th career WTA Tour title.

Sloane Stephens was the reigning champion, but chose not to participate this year.

== Seeds ==
1. (Ukraine) Elina Svitolina (champion)
2. (Czech Republic) Linda Nosková (second round)
3. (Serbia) Olga Danilović (final)
4. (United States) McCartney Kessler (first round)
5. (Japan) Moyuka Uchijima (quarterfinals)
6. (United States) Alycia Parks (first round)
7. (Italy) Lucia Bronzetti (first round)
8. (United Kingdom) Sonay Kartal (first round)

== Draw ==
Key

- Q = Qualifier
- WC = Wild card
- LL = Lucky loser
- Alt = Alternate
- ITF = ITF entry
- PR = Protected ranking
- SR = Special ranking
- SE = Special exempt
- JE = Junior exempt
- JR = Junior Accelerator Programme entrant
- CO = College Accelerator Programme entrant
- NG = Next Gen Accelerator Program entrant
- w/o = Walkover
- r = Retired
- d = Defaulted

=== Finals ===
Semifinals
1	(Ukraine) Elina Svitolina	6	6
(Romania) Elena-Gabriela Ruse	0	2
3	(Serbia) Olga Danilović	6	6
(Netherlands) Suzan Lamens	4	4

Final
1	(Ukraine) Elina Svitolina	6	7^{10}
3	(Serbia) Olga Danilović	4	6^{8}

=== Top half ===
First round
1	(Ukraine) E Svitolina	6	6
(Switzerland) J Teichmann	4	2
(Ukraine) A Kalinina	6	6
Q	(Japan) N Hibino	0	4
(Greece) M Sakkari	0	6	3
(Spain) J Bouzas Maneiro	6	3	6
(France) V Gracheva	6	6
8	(United Kingdom) S Kartal	3	2
4	(United States) M Kessler	7^{10}	2	5
Q	(France) F Ferro	6^{8}	6	7
Q	(France) M Rouvroy	2	4
LL	(France) J Ponchet	6	6
WC	(France) E Jacquemot	6	1	4
(Romania) E-G Ruse	1	6	6
Q	(Italy) C Rosatello	6	6
6	(United States) A Parks	2	3

Second round
1	(Ukraine) E Svitolina	6	6
(Ukraine) A Kalinina	4	0
(Spain) J Bouzas Maneiro	6	6
(France) V Gracheva	3	3
Q	(France) F Ferro	6^{4}	4
LL	(France) J Ponchet	7^{7}	6
(Romania) E-G Ruse	6	6
Q	(Italy) C Rosatello	0	4

Quarterfinals
1	(Ukraine) E Svitolina	6	6
(Spain) J Bouzas Maneiro	3	2
LL	(France) J Ponchet	2	2
(Romania) E-G Ruse	6	6

Semifinals
1	(Ukraine) E Svitolina	6	6
(Romania) E-G Ruse	0	2

=== Bottom half ===
First round
5	(Japan) M Uchijima	3	6	6
LL	(Italy) N Brancaccio	6	2	1
WC	(France) L Boisson	6	6
(United Kingdom) H Dart	0	3
LL	(Czech Republic) L Fruhvirtová	6^{5}	6	7
A Blinkova	7^{7}	4	5
Q	(Serbia) A Krunić	7	0	3
3	(Serbia) O Danilović	5	6	6
7	(Italy) L Bronzetti	2	3
Q	(France) T Rakotomanga Rajaonah	6	6
(Romania) J Cristian	6	6
WC	(France) D Parry	4	3
WC	(Canada) B Andreescu	1	6	6^{2}
(Netherlands) S Lamens	6	4	7^{7}
(United States) B Pera	6	6^{5}	4
2	(Czech Republic) L Nosková	4	7^{7}	6

Second round
5	(Japan) M Uchijima	1	7^{7}	6
WC	(France) L Boisson	6	6^{4}	4
LL	(Czech Republic) L Fruhvirtová	2	6	4
3	(Serbia) O Danilović	6	3	6
Q	(France) T Rakotomanga Rajaonah	6	6
(Romania) J Cristian	2	3
(Netherlands) S Lamens	6	6
2	(Czech Republic) L Nosková	4	1

Quarterfinals
5	(Japan) M Uchijima	6^{9}	6	1
3	(Serbia) O Danilović	7^{11}	4	6
Q	(France) T Rakotomanga Rajaonah	3	3
(Netherlands) S Lamens	6	6

Semifinals
3	(Serbia) O Danilović	6	6
(Netherlands) S Lamens	4	4

== Qualifying ==
=== Seeds ===
1. (France) Jessika Ponchet (qualifying competition, lucky loser)
2. (Czech Republic) Linda Fruhvirtová (qualifying competition, lucky loser)
3. (France) Manon Léonard (qualifying competition)
4. (Italy) Nuria Brancaccio (qualifying competition) lucky loser)
5. (Japan) Nao Hibino (qualified)
6. (Canada) Carol Zhao (first round)
7. (France) Margaux Rouvroy (qualified)
8. (Serbia) Aleksandra Krunić (qualified)
9. (France) Tiantsoa Rakotomanga Rajaonah (qualified)
10. (Italy) Camilla Rosatello (qualified)
11. (France) Émeline Dartron (first round)
12. (Australia) Tina Nadine Smith (qualifying competition)

=== Qualifiers ===
1. (France) Tiantsoa Rakotomanga Rajaonah
2. (Serbia) Aleksandra Krunić
3. (France) Fiona Ferro
4. (Italy) Camilla Rosatello
5. (Japan) Nao Hibino
6. (France) Margaux Rouvroy

=== Lucky losers ===
1. (France) Jessika Ponchet
2. (Czech Republic) Linda Fruhvirtová
3. (Italy) Nuria Brancaccio

=== Qualifying draw ===
==== First qualifier ====
First round
1	(France) Jessika Ponchet	6	4	6
WC	(France) Astrid Lew Yan Foon	4	6	3
(United Kingdom) Emily Appleton	2	6^{0}
9/WC	(France) Tiantsoa Rakotomanga Rajaonah	6	7^{7}

Qualifying competition
1	(France) Jessika Ponchet	6^{1}	4
9/WC	(France) Tiantsoa Rakotomanga Rajaonah	7^{7}	6

==== Second qualifier ====
First round
2	(Czech Republic) Linda Fruhvirtová	4	6	6
(Italy) Jessica Pieri	6	2	0
(Belgium) Lara Salden	5	4
8	(Serbia) Aleksandra Krunić	7	6

Qualifying competition
2	(Czech Republic) Linda Fruhvirtová	7^{8}	5	3
8	(Serbia) Aleksandra Krunić	6^{6}	7	6

==== Third qualifier ====
First round
3	(France) Manon Léonard	6	7
(Italy) Dalila Spiteri	4	5
(France) Fiona Ferro	3	7^{7}	6
11/WC	(France) Émeline Dartron	6	6^{0}	1

Qualifying competition
3	(France) Manon Léonard	5	2
(France) Fiona Ferro	7	6

==== Fourth qualifier ====
First round
4	(Italy) Nuria Brancaccio	4	7	6
(France) Nahia Berecoechea	6	5	1
(France) Diana Martynov	3	5
10	(Italy) Camilla Rosatello	6	7

Qualifying competition
4	(Italy) Nuria Brancaccio	2	6	3
10	(Italy) Camilla Rosatello	6	2	6

==== Fifth qualifier ====
First round
5	(Japan) Nao Hibino	5	6	7
WC	(France) Yasmine Mansouri	7	4	5
(Ukraine) Nadiya Kolb	3	2
12	(Australia) Tina Nadine Smith	6	6

Qualifying competition
5	(Japan) Nao Hibino	6	6
12	(Australia) Tina Nadine Smith	4	4

==== Sixth qualifier ====
First round
6	(Canada) Carol Zhao	4	2
(France) Tiphanie Lemaître	6	6
Ekaterina Yashina	3	2
7	(France) Margaux Rouvroy	6	6

Qualifying competition
(France) Tiphanie Lemaître	1	3
7	(France) Margaux Rouvroy	6	6
