= Miriana Tona =

Italian tennis player (born 1995)

- Country (sports): Italy
- Born: 9 January 1995 (age 31) Taormina, Italy
- Plays: Right (two-handed backhand)
- Prize money: $144,404

Singles
- Career record: 257–226
- Career titles: 2 ITF
- Highest ranking: No. 310 (22 July 2024)
- Current ranking: No. 371 (28 September 2026)

Doubles
- Career record: 180–128
- Career titles: 17 ITF
- Highest ranking: No. 246 (8 September 2025)
- Current ranking: No. 305 (28 September 2026)
- Last updated on: 29 September 2026.

Miriana Tona (born 9 January 1995) is an Italian professional tennis player. Tona has a career-high singles ranking of world No. 310, achieved on 22 July 2024. Her highest doubles ranking is No. 246, attained on 8 September 2025.

Tona has won two singles titles and 17 doubles titles on the ITF Women's Circuit.

== Career ==
In 2021, she won the first singles title of her career in Piracicaba, Brazil.

In April 2023, she won the singles final and doubles championship in Antalya, Türkiye. The following week, she won the doubles championship in the first W25 tournament of her career in Larnaca, Cyprus. In August, she played in the biggest singles final of her career at the W40 tournament in Arequipa, Peru.

In March 2024, she played the second most important singles final of her career at the W50 tournament in São Paulo, Brazil where she was defeated by Maria Kozyreva. In April, she played in the doubles finals of two tournaments in Colombia, in Mosquera and Anapoima. In September, she played in Leme and Piracicaba, Brazil and in Pula, Italy and became doubles champion at all three W35 events.

In March 2025, she won the biggest title of her career with her Czech partner Michaela Bayerlová at the W50 Vacaria Open in Brazil. In September 2025, at 30 years old, she made her WTA Tour debut at the SP Open, qualifying for the main draw (with wins over Lian Tran and Pietra Rivoli) and played the biggest match of her career against top seed Beatriz Haddad Maia, losing in straight sets.

Entering as a lucky loser, Tona achieved her first WTA Tour main-draw match win at the 2026 Athens Open, defeating wildcard entrant Sapfo Sakellaridi. She lost to top seed Clara Tauson in the second round.

== ITF Circuit finals ==
=== Singles: 9 (2 titles, 7 runner-ups) ===
Legend W40/50 tournaments W35 tournaments W15 tournaments	Finals by surface Hard (0–2) Clay (2–5)

Result	W–L	Date	Tournament	Tier	Surface	Opponent	Score
Win	1–0	Oct 2021	ITF Piracicaba, Brazil	W15	Clay	(Germany) Luisa Meyer auf der Heide	6–1, 6–2
Loss	1–1	Aug 2022	ITF Savitaipale, Finland	W15	Clay	(Germany) Antonia Schmidt	5–7, 2–6
Loss	1–2	Apr 2023	ITF Antalya, Turkiye	W15	Clay	Diana Demidova	4–6, 3–6
Loss	1–3	Aug 2023	ITF Arequipa, Peru	W40	Clay	Jana Kolodynska	6–2, 3–6, 4–6
Loss	1–4	Mar 2024	ITF São Paulo, Brazil	W50	Clay	Maria Kozyreva	7–5, 0–6, 3–6
Win	2–4	Apr 2025	ITF São Paulo, Brazil	W35	Clay	(Brazil) Carolina Alves	7–5, 6–4
Loss	2–5	Jul 2025	ITF Rio Claro, Brazil	W35	Clay	(Peru) Lucciana Pérez Alarcón	1–6, 2–6
Loss	2–6	Mar 2026	ITF Huamantla, Mexico	W15	Hard	(Poland) Gina Feistel	5–7, 1–6
Loss	2–7	Mar 2026	ITF Huamantla, Mexico	W35	Hard	(Ukraine) Valeriya Strakhova	7–5, 1–6, 1–6

=== Doubles: 31 (17 titles, 14 runner-ups) ===
Legend W50 tournaments W25/35 tournaments W10/15 tournaments	Finals by surface Hard (3–2) Clay (12–10) Carpet (2–2)

Result	W–L	Date	Tournament	Tier	Surface	Partner	Opponents	Score
Loss	0–1	Nov 2015	ITF Rabat, Morocco	W10	Clay	(France) Léa Tholey	(Oman) Fatma Al-Nabhani (Spain) Olga Parres Azcoitia	6–7^{(5)}, 5–7
Loss	0–2	Feb 2016	ITF Palma Nova, Spain	W10	Clay	(Colombia) Yuliana Lizarazo	(Italy) Martina di Giuseppe (Italy) Giorgia Marchetti	2–6, 4–6
Loss	0–3	Jun 2016	ITF Antalya, Turkey	W10	Hard	(Cyprus) Raluca Șerban	(Netherlands) Arianne Hartono (New Zealand) Paige Hourigan	3–6, ret.
Loss	0–4	Nov 2016	ITF Solarino, Italy	W10	Carpet	(Italy) Veronica Napolitano	(Romania) Elena Bogdan (Poland) Justyna Jegiołka	6–4, 3–6, [7–10]
Win	1–4	Nov 2017	ITF Agadir, Morocco	W15	Clay	(Austria) Pia König	(Croatia) Mariana Dražić (Romania) Oana Georgeta Simion	4–6, 7–6^{(5)}, [10–8]
Win	2–4	Dec 2017	ITF Hammamet, Tunisia	W15	Clay	(Italy) Anna-Giulia Remondina	(Bosnia and Herzegovina) Jelena Simić (France) Jade Suvrijn	6–3, 6–4
Loss	2–5	Aug 2018	ITF Vrnjačka Banja, Serbia	W15	Clay	(Russia) Anna Makhorkina	(Germany) Joëlle Steur (Germany) Julyette Steur	2–6, 3–6
Loss	2–6	Oct 2018	ITF Monastir, Tunisia	W15	Hard	(Germany) Natalia Siedliska	(France) Loudmilla Bencheikh (France) Yasmine Mansouri	4–6, 1–6
Win	3–6	Oct 2018	ITF Monastir, Tunisia	W15	Hard	(Croatia) Silvia Njirić	(Algeria) Amira Benaïssa (Malta) Elaine Genovese	1–6, 7–6^{(2)}, [10–4]
Win	4–6	Oct 2018	ITF Monastir, Tunisia	W15	Hard	(Romania) Ilona Georgiana Ghioroaie	(Netherlands) Dominique Karregat (Netherlands) Annick Melgers	6–2, 6–2
Win	5–6	Nov 2018	ITF Solarino, Italia	W15	Carpet	(Argentina) Catalina Pella	(Russia) Ekaterina Reyngold (Russia) Yulia Sokolovskaya	6–4, 6–2
Win	6–6	Dec 2018	ITF Solarino, Italia	W15	Carpet	(Argentina) Catalina Pella	(Slovenia) Veronika Erjavec (Slovenia) Kristina Novak	7–5, 6–3
Loss	6–7	Aug 2012	ITF Savitaipale, Finland	W15	Clay	(Bulgaria) Ani Vangelova	(Estonia) Anet Angelika Koskel (Estonia) Katriin Saar	7–5, 3–6, [2–10]
Loss	6–8	Oct 2022	ITF Solarino, Italy	W15	Carpet	(Italy) Giulia Crescenzi	(Switzerland) Leonie Küng (Netherlands) Lian Tran	2–6, 2–6
Win	7–8	Apr 2023	ITF Antalya Turkey	W15	Clay	(Netherlands) Merel Hoedt	(Kazakhstan) Asylzhan Arystanbekova (Kazakhstan) Dana Baidaulet	6–4, 6–4
Win	8–8	May 2023	ITF Larnaca, Cyprus	W25	Clay	(Germany) Luisa Meyer auf der Heide	(Cyprus) Raluca Șerban (Cyprus) Maria Siopacha	7–5, 6–4
Loss	8–9	Sep 2023	ITF Santa Margherita di Pula, Italy	W25	Clay	(France) Yasmine Mansouri	(Slovenia) Živa Falkner (Germany) Katharina Hobgarski	1–6, 2–6
Win	9–9	Jan 2024	ITF Buenos Aires, Argentina	W35	Clay	(Italy) Nicole Fossa Huergo	(Argentina) Melany Krywoj (Bolivia) Noelia Zeballos	7–5, 6–3
Loss	9–10	Apr 2024	ITF Mosquera, Colombia	W35	Clay	(Italy) Nicole Fossa Huergo	(Argentina) Jazmín Ortenzi (Mexico) María Portillo Ramírez	3–6, 2–6
Loss	9–11	Apr 2024	ITF Anapoima, Colombia	W35	Clay	(Italy) Nicole Fossa Huergo	(Argentina) Jazmín Ortenzi (Mexico) María Portillo Ramírez	4–6, 3–6
Loss	9–12	Jun 2024	ITF Tarvisio, Italy	W35	Clay	(Slovenia) Živa Falkner	Anastasia Sukhotina; Anna Zyryanova	6–7^{(3)}, 2–6
Win	10–12	Sep 2024	ITF Piracicaba, Brazil	W35	Clay	(Bolivia) Noelia Zeballos	(Colombia) María Paulina Pérez (Italy) Aurora Zantedeschi	5–7, 6–1, [12–10]
Win	11–12	Sep 2024	ITF Leme, Brazil	W35	Clay	(Bolivia) Noelia Zeballos	(Brazil) Rebeca Pereira (Ecuador) Camila Romero	4–6, 6–4, [10–4]
Win	12–12	Oct 2024	ITF Santa Margherita di Pula, Italy	W35	Clay	(Italy) Anastasia Abbagnato	(United States) Jaeda Daniel (Burundi) Sada Nahimana	6–7^{(3)}, 6–3, [12–10]
Win	13–12	Mar 2025	Vacaria Open, Brazil	W50	Clay (i)	(Czech Republic) Michaela Bayerlová	(United States) Robin Anderson (Spain) Alicia Herrero Liñana	6–7^{(4)}, 7–6^{(5)}, [10–7]
Win	14–12	May 2025	ITF Santo Domingo, Dominican Republic	W35	Clay	(Bolivia) Noelia Zeballos	(Italy) Francesca Pace (Poland) Zuzanna Pawlikowska	6–0, 6–3
Win	15–12	May 2025	ITF Santo Domingo, Dominican Republic	W35	Clay	(Bolivia) Noelia Zeballos	(Italy) Francesca Pace (Poland) Zuzanna Pawlikowska	6–4, 6–3
Loss	15–13	Aug 2025	ITF Bytom, Poland	W50	Clay	(Czech Republic) Aneta Kučmová	(Poland) Weronika Ewald (Poland) Zuzanna Pawlikowska	6–3, 3–6, [7–10]
Loss	15–14	Oct 2025	ITF Neuquén, Argentina	W35	Clay	(Argentina) Maria Florencia Urrutia	(Chile) Jimar Gerald González (Ecuador) Mell Reasco González	4–6, 6–2, [8–10]
Win	16–14	Mar 2026	ITF Huamantla, Mexico	W15	Hard	(Venezuela) Sofía Elena Cabezas Domínguez	(Mexico) Lya Fernández (Curaçao) Sarah Victoria Nita	6–3, 6–3
Win	17–14	Jun 2026	ITF San Gregorio, Italy	W35	Clay	(Peru) Lucciana Pérez	(Italy) Eleonora Alvisi (Italy) Francesca Gandolfi	7–6^{(2)}, 4–6, [10–7]
