= Open de Rouen =

WTA Tour
- Event name: Open Rouen Capfinances Métropole
- Tour: WTA Tour
- Founded: 2022; 4 years ago
- Editions: 5
- Location: Rouen; France
- Venue: Kindarena
- Category: WTA 250 (2024–), WTA 125 (2022–2023)
- Surface: Clay - indoor
- Draw: 32S / 16D
- Prize money: €246,388 (2026)
- Website: openrouen.fr

Current champions (2026)
- Women's singles: (Ukraine) Marta Kostyuk
- Women's doubles: (Czech Republic) Jesika Malečková (Czech Republic) Miriam Škoch

The Open de Rouen (currently sponsored by Capfinances Métropole) is a professional women's tennis tournament, introduced in 2022 as part of the WTA Tour. Since 2024, it is a WTA 250 level event and is played on indoor clay courts during the same week in April as the WTA 500 level event in Stuttgart, Germany. It is staged at the Kindarena in the city of Rouen in France.

Prior to that, it was played as a WTA 125-level tournament on indoor hardcourts, in the month of October.

== Results ==
=== Singles ===
Year	Champion	Runner-up	Score
↓ WTA 125 event ↓
2022	(Belgium) Maryna Zanevska	(Switzerland) Viktorija Golubic	7–6^{(8–6)}, 6–1
2023	(Switzerland) Viktorija Golubic	Erika Andreeva	6–4, 6–1
↓ WTA 250 event ↓
2024	(United States) Sloane Stephens	(Poland) Magda Linette	6–1, 2–6, 6–2
2025	(Ukraine) Elina Svitolina	(Serbia) Olga Danilović	6–4, 7–6^{(10–8)}
2026	(Ukraine) Marta Kostyuk	(Ukraine) Veronika Podrez	6–3, 6–4

=== Doubles ===
Year	Champions	Runners-up	Score
↓ WTA 125 event ↓
2022	(Georgia (country)) Natela Dzalamidze; Kamilla Rakhimova	(Japan) Misaki Doi (Georgia (country)) Oksana Kalashnikova	6–2, 7–5
2023	(United Kingdom) Maia Lumsden (France) Jessika Ponchet	(Hungary) Anna Bondár (Belgium) Kimberley Zimmermann	6–3, 7–6^{(7–4)}
↓ WTA 250 event ↓
2024	(Hungary) Tímea Babos; Irina Khromacheva	(United Kingdom) Naiktha Bains (United Kingdom) Maia Lumsden	6–3, 6–4
2025	(Serbia) Aleksandra Krunić (United States) Sabrina Santamaria	Irina Khromacheva (Czech Republic) Linda Nosková	6–0, 6–4
2026	(Czech Republic) Jesika Malečková (Czech Republic) Miriam Škoch	(Chinese Taipei) Liang En-shuo (China) Tang Qianhui	6–2, 7–5

== See also ==
- L'Open 35 de Saint-Malo
- Trophee Lagardere
- Grand Est Open 88
- Open Angers Arena Loire
- Open de Limoges
- Internationaux de Strasbourg
- Lyon Open
