= Maia Lumsden =

British tennis player (born 1998)

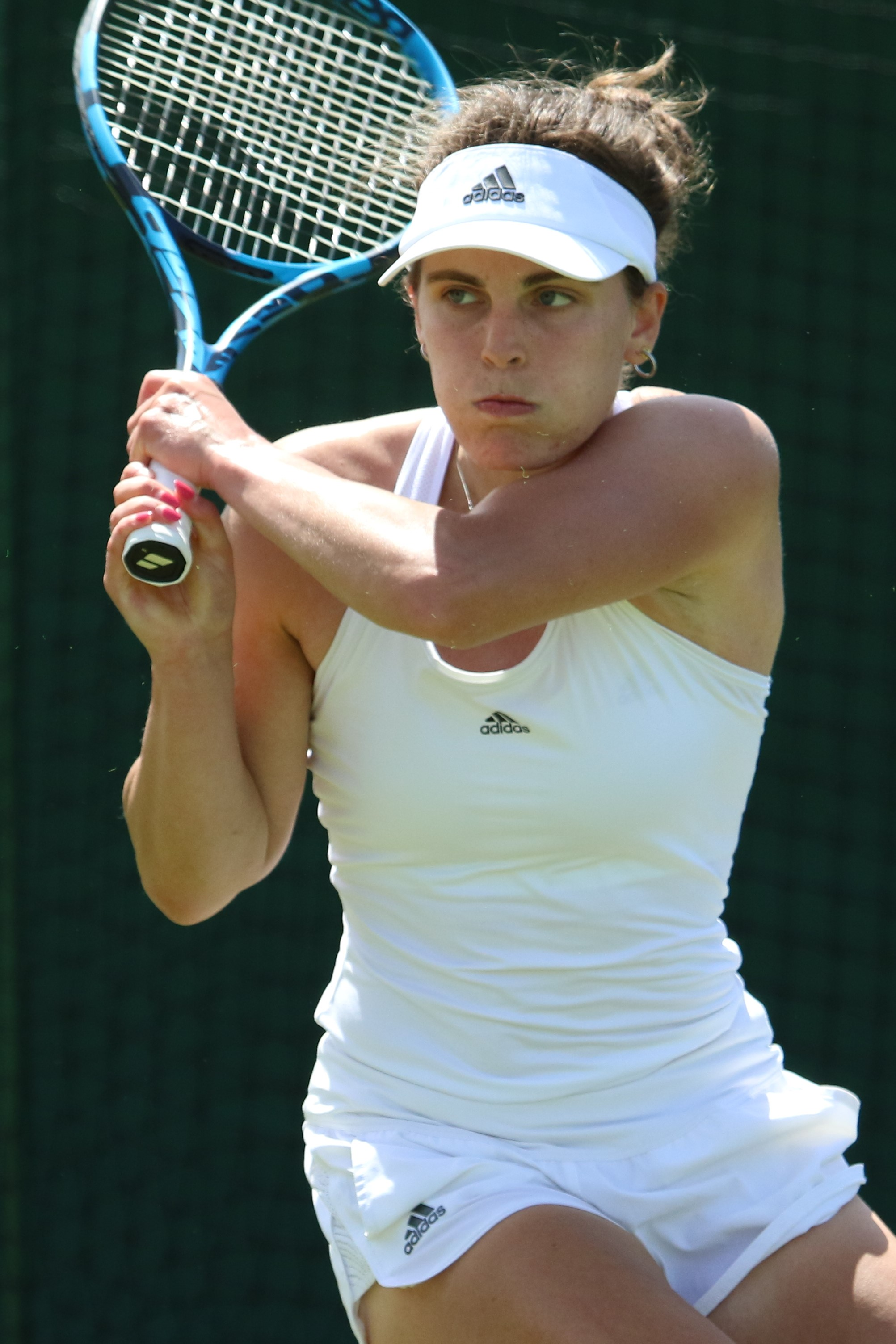
- Lumsden at the 2022 Wimbledon Championships
- Country (sports): Great Britain
- Born: 10 January 1998 (age 28) Glasgow, Scotland
- Prize money: $625,747

Singles
- Career record: 148–119
- Career titles: 3 ITF
- Highest ranking: No. 250 (14 October 2019)

Grand Slam singles results
- Wimbledon: Q1 (2016, 2017, 2018, 2019, 2022)

Doubles
- Career record: 188–138
- Career titles: 3
- Highest ranking: No. 34 (12 October 2026)
- Current ranking: No. 34 (12 October 2026)

Grand Slam doubles results
- Australian Open: 2R (2025)
- French Open: 2R (2024, 2025)
- Wimbledon: QF (2023)
- US Open: 2R (2024, 2026)

Grand Slam mixed doubles results
- Wimbledon: 2R (2025, 2026)
- Last updated on: 16 October 2026.

Maia Lumsden (born 10 January 1998) is a British professional tennis player. She has a career-high doubles ranking of world No. 34, achieved on 12 October 2026. Lumsden has won three WTA Tour doubles titles and five doubles titles on WTA 125 tournaments as well as three titles in singles and twelve in doubles on the ITF Circuit.

== Personal life ==
Raised in Lenzie, near Glasgow from a family of five, her mother Gillian and father David brother Ewen and sister Eve, two and four years younger, respectively. Both siblings have played competitive tennis as juniors with Ewen progressing to the senior level. Educated at Beaconhurst School, Bridge of Allan later studying at nearby University of Stirling after returning to Scotland in 2016.

== Career ==
=== Juniors ===
Recognized as young as age 10 as the best in Britain in her age group and training at the national academy, University of Stirling, under coach Toby Smith with mentoring by Judy Murray who said at the time that Lumsden may need to train abroad to realise her potential.

By 2012, she was the No. 1 under-14 player in the Tennis Europe rankings and Under-14 champion at the Junior Orange Bowl beating Gabriella Taylor 6–3, 7–5, in an all-British final. The following year the two players teamed up to become under-16 British National Junior Champions in the doubles whilst Lumsden was also the under-16 singles champion.

Gabi Taylor, Katie Swan, Freya Christie and Lumsden were members of the 2014 British team, coached by Judy Murray, which won the Maureen Connolly Challenge Trophy, an annual under-18s competition against the U.S. team.

She won an ITF under-18 title in Malta and the Super Open Auray, and reached the third round in the girls’ tournament at Wimbledon.

Lumsden was a member of Great Britain's University Tennis Team that won a gold medal at the Master’U tournament in 2017, and silver medal in 2018.

=== 2012: Professional debut ===
As a 14 year old, she won her first matches at ITF events beating England's Pippa Horn and Oman's Fatma Al-Nabhani, the second seed and world No. 463, to qualify for the Pro-Series event at Scotstoun.

=== 2017–2018: ITF Circuit success ===
In 2018, Lumsden's first full year as a professional, she recorded two individual title wins in Sunderland and the Wirral and six ITF doubles finals, three of them as winner.

In 2017, entering her home competition in Scotstoun, Glasgow as a wildcard, Lumsden lost to her Spanish opponent Paula Badosa in the final of the GB Pro-Series Glasgow or Scottish Championships. In November, Lumsden claimed her first $25k title, beating former top 100 player Valeria Savinykh in the final.

=== 2019: WTA Tour singles debut ===
In February, Lumsden lost at the quarterfinal stage of the W60 Shrewsbury event to top-seeded Yanina Wickmayer.

She made her WTA Tour singles debut at the Nottingham Open in June, after receiving a wildcard into the main draw of the tournament, winning her first match against fellow Brit Tara Moore, then losing the following day to Caroline Garcia.

=== 2023–2024: Wimbledon doubles quarterfinal, top 75 ===
At the 2023 Wimbledon Championships, Lumsden and partner Naiktha Bains became the first British pair to reach the quarterfinals in 40 years.

She won her first WTA 125 title at the 2023 Open de Rouen, playing with Jessika Ponchet, and overcoming top seeds Anna Bondár and Kimberley Zimmermann in straight sets in the final.

Lumsden made her debut in the top 70 in the doubles rankings on 22 April 2024, following reaching the doubles final of the 2024 Open de Rouen with Naiktha Bains.

Partnering with Emily Appleton, she won her second WTA 125 title at the Midland Tennis Classic, defeating Ariana Arseneault and Mia Kupres in the final which went to a deciding champions tiebreak.

=== 2025: Two WTA 125 doubles titles ===
Partnering Harriet Dart, she reached the doubles semifinals at the Singapore Open. Alongside Makoto Ninomiya, she won the doubles title at the WTA 125 Open de Saint-Malo in May, defeating Oksana Kalashnikova and Angelica Moratelli in the final.

In September, Lumsden and Harriet Dart won the doubles title at the WTA 125 Caldas da Rainha Open, defeating Madeleine Brooks and Anastasia Tikhonova in the final.

=== 2026: Three more titles, top 50 ===
Partnering Isabelle Haverlag, Lumsden reached the final of the WTA 500 Mérida Open, losing to second seeds Cristina Bucșa and Jiang Xinyu. Once again teaming up with Haverlag, she won the fifth WTA 125 doubles title of her career at the Open de Saint-Malo, defeating Chan Hao-ching and Ivana Corley in the final.

Playing alongside Harriet Dart, Lumsden reached the final at the WTA 125 Birmingham Open in June, losing to top seeds Talia Gibson and Janice Tjen. Again playing with Harriet Dart, and entering as a wildcard team, she won her first career doubles title at the Nottingham Open, defeating second seeds Shuko Aoyama and Chan Hao-ching in the final.

Teaming up with Tang Qianhui, Lumsden was runner-up at the Athens Open, losing to top seeds Chan Hao-ching and Miyu Kato in the final. Reunited with Harriet Dart the following week, she won her second WTA Tour doubles title at the Prague Open, defeating Lucie Havlíčková and Laura Samson in the final. She made it back-to-back WTA Tour doubles titles the next week when she teamed up with Maria Kozyreva to defeat Chan Hao-ching and Maya Joint in the final at the Memphis Classic. As a result, Lumsden reached a career-high doubles ranking of world No. 49, on 3 August 2026. Again playing with Maria Kozyreva, she reached the final at the WTA 500 Monterrey Open, losing to Maya Joint and Xu Yifan.

== Doubles performance timeline ==
Key
W	F	SF	QF	#R	RR	Q#	P#	DNQ	A	Z#	PO	G	S	B	NMS	NTI	P	NH

(W) winner; (F) finalist; (SF) semifinalist; (QF) quarterfinalist; (#R) rounds 4, 3, 2, 1; (RR) round-robin stage; (Q#) qualification round; (P#) preliminary round; (DNQ) did not qualify; (A) absent; (Z#) Davis/Fed Cup Zonal Group (with number indication) or (PO) play-off; (G) gold, (S) silver or (B) bronze Olympic/Paralympic medal; (NMS) not a Masters tournament; (NTI) not a Tier I tournament; (P) postponed; (NH) not held; (SR) strike rate (events won / competed); (W–L) win–loss record.
To avoid confusion and double counting, these charts are updated at the conclusion of a tournament or when the player's participation has ended.

Only main-draw results in WTA Tour, Grand Slam tournaments, Fed Cup/Billie Jean King Cup and Olympic Games are included in win–loss records.

Tournament	2016	2017	2018	2019	...	2023	2024	2025	2026	SR	W–L	Win%
Grand Slam tournaments
Australian Open	A	A	A	A		A	1R	2R	1R	0 / 3	1–3	25%
French Open	A	A	A	A		A	2R	2R	1R	0 / 3	2–3	40%
Wimbledon	A	A	A	A		QF	1R	1R	1R	0 / 4	3–4	43%
US Open	A	A	A	A		A	2R	1R	2R	0 / 3	2–3	40%
Win–Loss	0–0	0–0	0–0	0–0		3–1	2–4	2–4	1–4	0 / 13	8–13	38%

== WTA Tour finals ==
=== Doubles: 7 (3 titles, 4 runner-ups) ===
Legend WTA 1000 WTA 500 (0–2) WTA 250 (3–2)	Finals by surface Hard (2–3) Clay (0–1) Grass (1–0)

Result	W–L	Date	Tournament	Tier	Surface	Partner	Opponents	Score
Loss	0–1	Apr 2024	Open de Rouen, France	WTA 250	Clay (i)	(United Kingdom) Naiktha Bains	(Hungary) Tímea Babos; Irina Khromacheva	3–6, 4–6
Loss	0–2	Mar 2026	Mérida Open, Mexico	WTA 500	Hard	(Netherlands) Isabelle Haverlag	(Spain) Cristina Bucșa (China) Jiang Xinyu	4–6, 1–6
Win	1–2	Jun 2026	Nottingham Open, United Kingdom	WTA 250	Grass	(United Kingdom) Harriet Dart	(Chinese Taipei) Chan Hao-ching (Japan) Shuko Aoyama	6–3, 6–4
Loss	1–3	Jul 2026	Athens Open, Greece	WTA 250	Hard	(China) Tang Qianhui	(Chinese Taipei) Chan Hao-ching (Japan) Miyu Kato	6–7^{(3)}, 6–4, [7–10]
Win	2–3	Jul 2026	Prague Open, Czech Republic	WTA 250	Hard	(United Kingdom) Harriet Dart	(Czech Republic) Lucie Havlíčková (Czech Republic) Laura Samson	6–4, 6–4
Win	3–3	Jul 2026	Memphis Classic, United States	WTA 250	Hard	Maria Kozyreva	(Chinese Taipei) Chan Hao-ching (Australia) Maya Joint	7–6^{(3)}, 6–3
Loss	3–4	Aug 2026	Monterrey Open, Mexico	WTA 500	Hard	Maria Kozyreva	(Australia) Maya Joint (China) Xu Yifan	2–6, 6–4, [5–10]

== WTA 125 finals ==
=== Doubles: 9 (5 titles, 4 runner-ups) ===
Result	W–L	Date	Tournament	Surface	Partner	Opponents	Score
Loss	0–1	Aug 2023	Kozerki Open, Poland	Hard	(United Kingdom) Naiktha Bains	(Poland) Katarzyna Kawa (France) Elixane Lechemia	3–6, 4–6
Win	1–1	Oct 2023	Open de Rouen, France	Hard (i)	(France) Jessika Ponchet	(Hungary) Anna Bondár (Belgium) Kimberley Zimmermann	6–3, 7–6^{(4)}
Loss	1–2	Dec 2023	Open de Limoges, France	Hard (i)	(Georgia (country)) Oksana Kalashnikova	(Spain) Cristina Bucșa (Russia) Yana Sizikova	4–6, 1–6
Win	2–2	Nov 2024	Midland Tennis Classic, United States	Hard (i)	(United Kingdom) Emily Appleton	(Canada) Ariana Arseneault (Canada) Mia Kupres	6–2, 4–6, [10–5]
Win	3–2	May 2025	Open de Saint-Malo, France	Clay	(Japan) Makoto Ninomiya	(Georgia (country)) Oksana Kalashnikova (Italy) Angelica Moratelli	7–5, 6–2
Win	4–2	Sep 2025	Caldas da Rainha Open, Portugal	Hard	(United Kingdom) Harriet Dart	(United Kingdom) Madeleine Brooks; Anastasia Tikhonova	6–0, 6–3
Loss	4–3	Oct 2025	Samsun Open, Turkey	Hard	(United Kingdom) Harriet Dart	(Switzerland) Naïma Karamoko (France) Tiantsoa Rakotomanga Rajaonah	5–7, 6–1, [6–10]
Win	5–3	May 2026	Open de Saint-Malo, France	Clay	(Netherlands) Isabelle Haverlag	(Chinese Taipei) Chan Hao-ching (United States) Ivana Corley	6–4, 6–0
Loss	5–4	Jun 2026	Birmingham Open, UK	Grass	(United Kingdom) Harriet Dart	(Australia) Talia Gibson (Indonesia) Janice Tjen	4–6, 3–6

== ITF Circuit finals ==
=== Singles: 8 (3 titles, 5 runner-ups) ===
Legend $25,000 tournaments (1–4) $10/15,000 tournaments (2–1)	Finals by surface Hard (3–5)

Result	W–L	Date	Tournament	Tier	Surface	Opponent	Score
Loss	0–1	Feb 2016	GB Pro-Series Glasgow, UK	10,000	Hard (i)	(Germany) Anna Zaja	4–6, 3–6
Win	1–1	Feb 2017	ITF Wirral, UK	15,000	Hard (i)	(Poland) Maja Chwalińska	6–4, 6–1
Win	2–1	Nov 2017	ITF Sunderland, UK	15,000	Hard (i)	(United Kingdom) Freya Christie	6–4, 6–0
Loss	2–2	Feb 2018	GB Pro-Series Glasgow, UK	25,000	Hard (i)	(Spain) Paula Badosa	6–2, 1–6, 3–6
Win	3–2	Nov 2018	GB Pro-Series Shrewsbury, UK	25,000	Hard (i)	(Russia) Valeria Savinykh	6–1, 4–6, 6–3
Loss	3–3	May 2019	ITF Goyang, South Korea	W25	Hard	(Serbia) Natalija Kostić	3–6, 2–6
Loss	3–4	Sep 2019	ITF Kiryat Shmona, Israel	W25	Hard	(Ukraine) Daria Snigur	1–6, 4–6
Loss	3–5	Jul 2022	ITF Nottingham, UK	W25	Hard	(Australia) Priscilla Hon	3–6, 6–3, 3–6

=== Doubles: 20 (12 titles, 8 runner-ups) ===
Legend $100,000 tournaments (1–1) $60,000 tournaments (2–1) $40,000 tournaments (1–0) $25,000 tournaments (5–4) $15,000 tournaments (3–2)	Finals by surface Hard (11–5) Clay (1–2) Grass (0–1)

Result	W–L	Date	Tournament	Tier	Surface	Partner	Opponents	Score
Win	1–0	Apr 2017	ITF Hammamet, Tunisia	15k	Clay	(Hungary) Panna Udvardy	(Chile) Fernanda Brito (Sweden) Fanny Östlund	6–4, 5–7, [10–4]
Loss	1–1	Aug 2017	ITF Mrągowo, Poland	15k	Clay	(Ukraine) Anastasiya Shoshyna	(Italy) Angelica Moratelli (France) Jade Suvrijn	4–6, 4–6
Loss	1–2	Sep 2017	ITF Varna, Bulgaria	15k	Clay	(Bulgaria) Julia Stamatova	(Bulgaria) Dia Evtimova (Belgium) Michaela Boev	6–2, 6–7^{(5)}, [3–10]
Win	2–2	Oct 2017	ITF Wirral, United Kingdom	15k	Hard (i)	(United Kingdom) Samantha Murray	(United Kingdom) Alicia Barnett (United Kingdom) Laura Sainsbury	6–4, 6–3
Win	3–2	Nov 2017	ITF Sunderland, UK	15k	Hard (i)	(Greece) Eleni Kordolaimi	(United Kingdom) Alicia Barnett (United Kingdom) Sarah Beth Grey	2–6, 6–2, [11–9]
Loss	3–3	Nov 2017	GB Pro-Series Shrewsbury, UK	25k	Hard (i)	(United Kingdom) Katie Swan	(United Kingdom) Freya Christie (United Kingdom) Harriet Dart	6–3, 4–6, [6–10]
Loss	3–4	Oct 2020	ITF Istanbul, Turkey	W25	Hard (i)	(Turkey) Melis Sezer	(Romania) Jaqueline Cristian (Romania) Elena-Gabriela Ruse	3–6, 4–6
Win	4–4	May 2022	ITF Nottingham, UK	W25	Hard	(United Kingdom) Naiktha Bains	(Australia) Kimberly Birrell (Australia) Alexandra Osborne	3–6, 7–6^{(6)}, [11–9]
Loss	4–5	Jun 2022	Ilkley Trophy, UK	W100	Grass	(United Kingdom) Naiktha Bains	(Australia) Lizette Cabrera (South Korea) Jang Su-jeong	7–6^{(7)}, 0–6, [9–11]
Win	5–5	Jul 2022	ITF Roehampton, UK	W25	Hard	(United Kingdom) Naiktha Bains	(United Kingdom) Lauryn John-Baptiste (Slovakia) Katarína Strešnáková	6–1, 7–6^{(4)}
Loss	5–6	Aug 2022	GB Pro-Series Foxhills, UK	W25	Hard (i)	(United Kingdom) Naiktha Bains	(United Kingdom) Freya Christie (United Kingdom) Ali Collins	3–6, 3–6
Loss	5–7	Aug 2022	ITF Roehampton, UK	W25	Hard	(United Kingdom) Naiktha Bains	(India) Rutuja Bhosale (Japan) Erika Sema	6–4, 3–6, [9–11]
Win	6–7	Oct 2022	Trnava Indoor, Slovakia	W60	Hard (i)	(Georgia (country)) Mariam Bolkvadze	(Switzerland) Conny Perrin (Latvia) Diāna Marcinkēviča	6–2, 6–3
Win	7–7	Feb 2023	GB Pro-Series Glasgow, UK	W25	Hard (i)	(United Kingdom) Ella McDonald	(Czech Republic) Dominika Šalková (Czech Republic) Anna Sisková	3–6, 6–1, [13–11]
Win	8–7	Apr 2023	ITF Nottingham, UK	W25	Hard	(United Kingdom) Naiktha Bains	(India) Ankita Raina (India) Rutuja Bhosale	6–1, 6–4
Win	9–7	Apr 2023	ITF Calvi, France	W40	Hard	(United Kingdom) Naiktha Bains	(India) Ankita Raina (France) Estelle Cascino	6–4, 3–6, [10–7]
Win	10–7	May 2023	ITF Nottingham, UK	W25	Hard	(United Kingdom) Naiktha Bains	(China) Lu Jiajing (Estonia) Elena Malõgina	4–6, 6–4, [10–6]
Win	11–7	Oct 2023	Scottish Open Championships, UK	W60	Hard (i)	(Portugal) Francisca Jorge	(United Kingdom) Freya Christie (Australia) Olivia Gadecki	6–3, 6–1
Loss	11–8	Mar 2024	Open de Seine-et-Marne, France	W60	Hard (i)	(France) Jessika Ponchet	(France) Estelle Cascino (Philippines) Alex Eala	5–7, 6–7^{(4)}
Win	12–8	Jan 2026	ITF Fujairah Championships, United Arab Emirates	W100	Hard	(United Kingdom) Harriet Dart	(Netherlands) Isabelle Haverlag; Elena Pridankina	6–1, 6–0
