= 2026 Memphis Classic =

- Date: July 27 – August 2
- Edition: 1st
- Category: WTA 250
- Draw: 32S / 19Q / 16D
- Prize money: $283,347
- Surface: Hard / outdoor
- Location: Memphis, Tennessee, United States
- Venue: Leftwich Tennis Center

Champions

Singles
- Kristina Liutova

Doubles
- Maria Kozyreva / (United Kingdom) Maia Lumsden
- Memphis Classic

The 2026 Memphis Classic was a women's WTA tennis tournament played on outdoor hardcourts as part of the WTA 250 category of the 2026 WTA Tour. It was the first edition of the tournament and took place at the Leftwich Tennis Center in Memphis, Tennessee, United States from 27 July through 2 August 2026. The tournament replaced the Tennis in the Land tournament in Cleveland on the WTA schedule and marked a return of the WTA Tour to Memphis after an absence of 13 years.

== Champions ==
=== Singles ===
- Kristina Liutova def. (Czech Republic) Darja Vidmanova, 1–6, 6–1, 6–3

=== Doubles ===
- Maria Kozyreva / (United Kingdom) Maia Lumsden def. (Chinese Taipei) Chan Hao-ching / (Australia) Maya Joint, 7–6^{(8–6)}, 6–3

== Singles main draw entrants ==
=== Seeds ===
| Country | Player | Rank^{1} | Seed |
|---|---|---|---|
| | Ekaterina Alexandrova | 19 | 1 |
| USA | McCartney Kessler | 46 | 2 |
| SUI | Viktorija Golubic | 47 | 3 |
| TUR | Zeynep Sönmez | 48 | 4 |
| COL | Camila Osorio | 52 | 5 |
| USA | Caty McNally | 53 | 6 |
| USA | Peyton Stearns | 58 | 7 |
| UKR | Yuliia Starodubtseva | 59 | 8 |

- Rankings are as of 20 July 2026.

=== Other entrants ===
The following players received wildcards into the singles main draw:

- (Canada) Cadence Brace
- (United States) Reese Brantmeier
- (United States) Whitney Osuigwe
- (United States) Sloane Stephens

The following players received entry from the qualifying draw:

- (Australia) Storm Hunter
- Kristina Liutova
- (China) Ma Yexin
- Tatiana Prozorova
- (Canada) Katherine Sebov
- Iryna Shymanovich

=== Withdrawals ===
- (Croatia) Petra Marčinko → replaced by (Germany) Tatjana Maria
- (United States) Alycia Parks → replaced by (Spain) Marina Bassols Ribera
- (Croatia) Antonia Ružić → replaced by (United States) Katie Volynets
- (Hungary) Panna Udvardy → replaced by (United States) Elvina Kalieva
- (Ukraine) Dayana Yastremska → replaced by (Czech Republic) Linda Fruhvirtová

== Doubles main draw entrants ==
=== Seeds ===
| Country | Player | Country | Player | Rank^{†} | Seed |
|---|---|---|---|---|---|
| AUS | Storm Hunter | USA | Desirae Krawczyk | 62 | 1 |
| TPE | Chan Hao-ching | AUS | Maya Joint | 94 | 2 |
| UKR | Lyudmyla Kichenok | UKR | Nadiia Kichenok | 116 | 3 |
| | Maria Kozyreva | GBR | Maia Lumsden | 121 | 4 |

† Rankings are as of 20 July 2026

=== Other entrants ===
The following pairs received wildcards into the main draw:

- (United States) Anna Frey / (United States) Sloane Stephens
- (United Kingdom) Sofia Johnson / (Spain) Aran Teixidó García

The following pair received entry into the main draw as alternates:

- (India) Ankita Raina / (Australia) Astra Sharma

=== Withdrawals ===
- Ekaterina Alexandrova / (Australia) Talia Gibson → not replaced
- (United States) Whitney Osuigwe / (Italy) Lucrezia Stefanini → replaced by (India) Ankita Raina / (Australia) Astra Sharma
