= 1984 Virginia Slims of Utah =

Tennis tournament

- Date: September 10 – 16
- Edition: 3rd
- Category: Ginny Circuit
- Draw: 32S / 16D
- Prize money: $50,000
- Location: Salt Lake City, Utah, U.S.

Champions

Singles
- (South Africa) Yvonne Vermaak

Doubles
- (Australia) Anne Minter / (Australia) Elizabeth Minter
← 1983 ·	Virginia Slims of Utah	· 1985 →

The 1984 Virginia Slims of Utah was a women's tennis tournament played on outdoor hard courts in Salt Lake City, Utah in the United States that was part of the 1984 Virginia Slims World Championship Series. The tournament was held from September 10 through September 16, 1984. Third-seeded Yvonne Vermaak won the singles title.

== Finals ==
=== Singles ===
(South Africa) Yvonne Vermaak defeated (United States) Terry Holladay 6–1, 6–2

- It was Vermaak's 3rd title of the year and the 7th of her career.

=== Doubles ===
(Australia) Anne Minter / (Australia) Elizabeth Minter defeated (United States) Heather Crowe / (United States) Robin White 6–2, 7–5

- It was A. Minter's 1st career title. It was E. Minter's 1st career title.
