= 1983 Virginia Slims of Utah =

- Date: September 12 – 17
- Edition: 2nd
- Category: Ginny Tournament Circuit
- Draw: 32S / 16D
- Prize money: $50,000
- Surface: Hard / outdoors
- Location: Salt Lake City, Utah, U.S.
- Venue: Canyon Racquet Club

Champions

Singles
- (South Africa) Yvonne Vermaak

Doubles
- (Brazil) Cláudia Monteiro / (South Africa) Yvonne Vermaak
← 1982 ·	Virginia Slims of Utah	· 1984 →

The 1983 Virginia Slims of Utah, also known as the Ginny of Utah, was a women's tennis tournament played on outdoor hard courts at the Canyon Racquet Club in Salt Lake City, Utah, in the United States that was part of the Ginny Tournament Circuit (Note: The 1983 Ginny Tournament Circuit consisted of eight $50,000 events played between February and September, followed by a $100,000 Ginny Championships in November. All tournaments were held in the United States.) of the 1983 Virginia Slims World Championship Series. It was the second edition of the tournament and was held from September 12 to 17, 1983. First-seeded Yvonne Vermaak won the singles title and earned $7,000 first-prize money.

== Finals ==
=== Singles ===
(South Africa) Yvonne Vermaak defeated (United States) Felica Raschiatore 6–2, 0–6, 7–5

- It was Vermaak's 3rd title of the year and the 4th of her career.

=== Doubles ===
(Brazil) Cláudia Monteiro / (South Africa) Yvonne Vermaak defeated (United Kingdom) Amanda Brown / (Australia) Brenda Remilton 6–1, 3–6, 6–4

- It was Monteiro's 1st title of the year and the 3rd of her career. It was Vermaak's 2nd title of the year and the 3rd of her career.
