= Kristina Liutova =

Russian tennis player (born 2010)

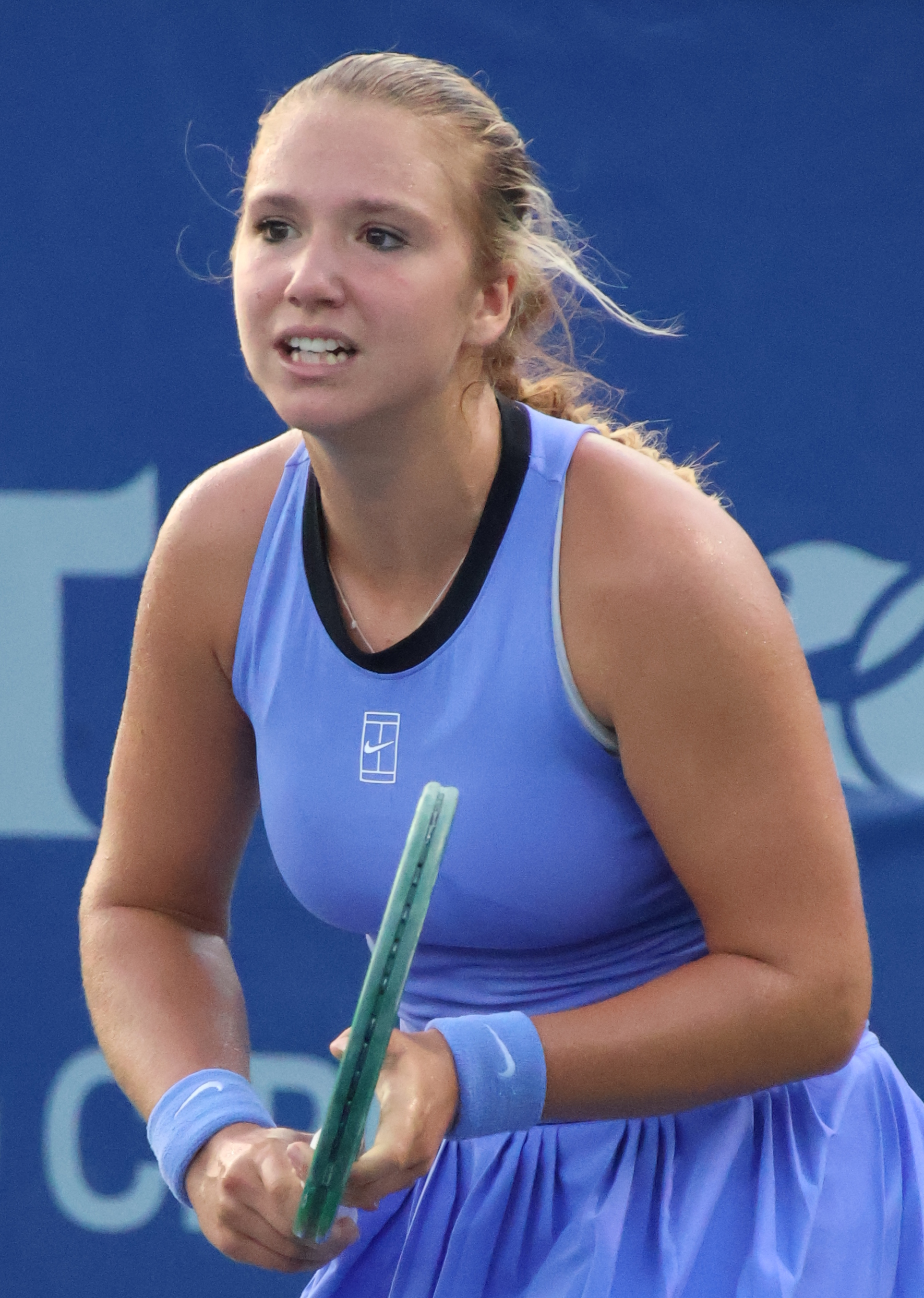
- Liutova in 2026
- Native name: Кристина Лютова
- Country (sports): Russia
- Residence: Redmond, Washington, US
- Born: 2 February 2010 (age 16) Moscow, Russia
- Prize money: $86,889

Singles
- Career record: 62–17
- Career titles: 1
- Highest ranking: No. 103ª (2 November 2026)
- Current ranking: No. 103ª (2 November 2026)

Grand Slam singles results
- US Open: 1R (2026)

Doubles
- Career record: 2–7
- Highest ranking: No. 1,242 (6 April 2026)
- Current ranking: No. 1,628 (24 August 2026)
- Last updated on: 27 July 2026.

Kristina Liutova (Russian: Кристина Лютова; born 2 February 2010) is a Russian tennis player. Liutova has a career-high singles ranking by the WTA of No. 103, achieved on 2 November 2026. She has won one WTA Tour title, and three titles on the ITF Women's World Tennis Tour.

Living in the U.S. since 2020, Liutova won the 2022 Under-12 Orange Bowl and the 2023 USTA Under-16 Nationals. In July 2026, at 16 years of age, she won her first Tour title at the 2026 Memphis Classic and became the second-youngest WTA champion to win a title in her tour-level debut after Mirjana Lučić in 1997.

== Personal life ==
Liutova was born in Moscow, but has lived and trained in Redmond, Washington since 2020 and has a green card. She said in 2025 that she would like to represent the U.S.: "I hope it will be as soon as possible. I want to be with the United States, as soon as I can."

== Career ==
Liutova has trained at the Gorin Academy in Redmond since 2020.

=== 2023–2025 ===
In her junior years, Liutova won the 2022 Under-12 Orange Bowl and the 2023 USTA Under-16 Nationals. She won a total of nine junior titles, including J300 titles in College Park, Maryland and Bradenton, Florida in 2025.

In May 2025, she defeated Madison Brengle at a $50k USTA Pro Circuit ITF World Tennis Tour tournament in Indian Harbour Beach, Florida.

=== 2026: First WTA Tour title at age 16 ===
Liutova began 2026 ranked No. 714 in the world. She won a W35 title in Las Vegas in February 2026, without dropping a set. A few weeks later, she entered the top 500 of the WTA rankings.

In May, Liutova won a W100 tournament in Indian Harbour Beach, Florida, defeating Julia Riera in the final. She was the second-youngest winner of a title at that level, behind only Alina Korneeva. This title led to Liutova climbing 119 places in the rankings to a career-high ranking of No. 303 on 18 May 2026.

One month later, in her next tournament, she won her second W100 title in Sumter, South Carolina, defeating 2026 NCAA champion Reese Brantmeier in the final. She moved up 83 places, to No. 229 in the world. Liutova won the title without losing a set, and became the youngest woman to win multiple W100 titles.

In July, at the age of 16 and ranked No. 229, she made her WTA Tour debut at the WTA 250 hard court 2026 Memphis Classic after qualifying. She defeated compatriot and top seed Ekaterina Alexandrova, recording her first tour-level win. Liutova became the second 2010s-born player to win a WTA match, after Brazilian Naná Silva. She ultimately in the tournament became the youngest player to reach a WTA Tour final since Coco Gauff at the 2019 Linz Open, and the first player born in the 2010s to advance to a WTA final. Liutova went on to win her first career title against 2025 NCAA champion Darja Vidmanova in three sets. She became the second-youngest WTA champion to win a title in her tour-level debut, older than only Mirjana Lučić, who won the 1997 Bol Ladies Open. She also became the 10th player ever to win a title in her WTA Tour debut (and the first player to do so since Maria Timofeeva won the 2023 Budapest Grand Prix). In the tournament, she defeated three players ranked in the world top 100. As a result of her victory, she rose 103 places and reached career-high No. 126 in the rankings on 3 August 2026.

Liutova won three qualification matches to make it into the main draw of the 2026 US Open on her Grand Slam debut, where she lost to Zheng Qinwen in the first round, in three sets.

== Performance timelines ==
Key
W	F	SF	QF	#R	RR	Q#	DNQ	A	NH

(W) winner; (F) finalist; (SF) semifinalist; (QF) quarterfinalist; (#R) rounds 4, 3, 2, 1; (RR) round-robin stage; (Q#) qualification round; (DNQ) did not qualify; (A) absent; (NH) not held; (SR) strike rate (events won / competed); (W–L) win–loss record.
To avoid confusion and double counting, these charts are updated at the conclusion of a tournament or when the player's participation has ended.

=== Singles ===
Current through the 2026 US Open.

Tournament	2025	2026	SR	W–L	Win %
Grand Slam tournaments
Australian Open	A	A	0 / 0	0–0	–
French Open	A	A	0 / 0	0–0	–
Wimbledon	A	A	0 / 0	0–0	–
US Open	A	1R	0 / 1	0–1	0%
Win–loss	0–0	0–1	0 / 1	0–1	0%
WTA 1000 tournaments
Qatar Open	A	A	0 / 0	0–0	–
Dubai Championships	A	A	0 / 0	0–0	–
Indian Wells Open	A	A	0 / 0	0–0	–
Miami Open	A	A	0 / 0	0–0	–
Madrid Open	A	A	0 / 0	0–0	–
Italian Open	A	A	0 / 0	0–0	–
Canadian Open	A	A	0 / 0	0–0	–
Cincinnati Open	A	A	0 / 0	0–0	–
China Open	A		0 / 0	0–0	–
Wuhan Open	A		0 / 0	0–0	–
Win–loss	0–0	0–0	0 / 0	0–0	–
Career statistics
	2025	2026	SR	W–L	Win %
Tournaments	0	2	Career total: 2		
Titles	0	1	Career total: 1		
Finals	0	1	Career total: 1		
Hard win–loss	0–0	5–1	1 / 2	5–1	83%
Clay win–loss	0–0	0–0	0 / 0	0–0	–
Grass win–loss	0–0	0–0	0 / 0	0–0	–
Overall win–loss	0–0	5–1	1 / 2	5–1	83%
Win %	–	83%	Career total: 83%		
Year-end ranking	808				

== WTA Tour finals ==
=== Singles: 1 (title) ===
Legend WTA 250 (1–0)	Finals by surface Hard (1–0)	Finals by setting Outdoor (1–0)

Result	W–L	Date	Tournament	Tier	Surface	Opponent	Score
Win	1–0	Jul 2026	Memphis Classic, United States	WTA 250	Hard	(Czech Republic) Darja Vidmanova	1–6, 6–1, 6–3

== ITF Circuit finals ==
=== Singles: 4 (3 titles, 1 runner-up) ===
Legend W100 tournaments (2–1) W35 tournaments (1–0)	Finals by surface Hard (2–1) Clay (1–0)

Result	W–L	Date	Location	Tier	Surface	Opponent	Score
Win	1–0	Feb 2026	ITF Las Vegas, United States	W35	Hard	(United States) Chukwumelije Clarke	6–2, 6–4
Win	2–0	May 2026	ITF Indian Harbour Beach, United States	W100	Clay	(Argentina) Julia Riera	6–1, 6–7^{(4)}, 6–3
Win	3–0	May 2026	Palmetto Pro Open, United States	W100	Hard	(United States) Reese Brantmeier	6–4, 6–3
Loss	3–1	Oct 2026	Edmond Open, United States	W100	Hard	(United States) Sloane Stephens	3–6, 2–6

== ITF Junior finals ==
=== Singles: 11 (9 titles, 2 runner-ups) ===
Legend J500 (0–1) J300 (2–0) J100 (1–1) J60 (3–0) J30 (3–0)	Finals by surface Hard (7–0) Clay (2–2)

Result	W–L	Date	Location	Tier	Surface	Opponent	Score
Win	1–0	Sep 2023	ITF Corpus Christi, United States	J60	Hard	(United States) Kaia Giribalan	6–2, 6–0
Win	2–0	Oct 2023	ITF Atlanta, United States	J60	Hard	(United States) Sarah Ye	6–1, 6–1
Win	3–0	Nov 2023	ITF Boca Raton, United States	J60	Hard	(United States) Anita Tu	6–3, 6–2
Win	4–0	Jan 2024	ITF Claremont, United States	J30	Hard	(United States) Raya Kotseva	6–3, 6–2
Win	5–0	Jan 2024	ITF San Diego, United States	J30	Hard	(United States) Emily Deming	6–2, 6–3
Win	6–0	Feb 2024	ITF San Diego, United States	J30	Hard	(United States) Isabelle Thi De Luccia	6–2, 6–1
Win	7–0	Apr 2024	ITF Delray Beach, United States	J100	Clay	(United States) Hannah Ayrault	4–6, 6–2, 6–2
Loss	7–1	Apr 2024	ITF Coral Gables, United States	J100	Clay	(United States) Welles Newman	3–6, 6–4, 2–6
Win	8–1	Aug 2025	ITF Delray Beach, United States	J300	Hard	(Lithuania) Laima Vladson	6–2, 6–3
Win	9–1	Dec 2025	ITF Bradenton, United States	J300	Clay	(Serbia) Anastasija Cvetković	6–3, 6–0
Loss	9–2	Dec 2025	ITF Fort Lauderdale, United States	J500	Clay	(China) Sun Xinran	4–6, 1–6

=== Doubles: 1 (runner-up) ===
Legend J30 (0–1)	Finals by surface Hard (0–1)

Result	W–L	Date	Location	Tier	Surface	Partner	Opponents	Score
Loss	0–1	Jan 2024	ITF Claremont, United States	J30	Hard	(United States) Bianca Molnar	(United States) Emily Deming (United States) Ava Rodriguez	3–6, 1–6

== See also ==
- List of female players who have won at least one Tour-level title
- Sofia Kenin, Moscow-born tennis player who moved to the U.S.
