= 2026 Memphis Classic – Doubles =

Doubles
- 2026 Memphis Classic

Final
- Champions: Maria Kozyreva (United Kingdom) Maia Lumsden
- Runners-up: (Chinese Taipei) Chan Hao-ching (Australia) Maya Joint
- Score: 7–6^{(8–6)}, 6–3
- Date: 1st August 2026

Details
- Draw: 16 (2WC)
- Seeds: 8

Events
Singles	Doubles
- Memphis Classic

Maria Kozyreva and Maia Lumsden defeated Chan Hao-ching and Maya Joint 7–6^{(8–6)}, 6–3 in the final to win the inaugural doubles tennis title at the 2026 Memphis Classic. It was Kozyreva's first WTA Tour doubles title and Lumsden's third (her second in two weeks, following Prague).

== Seeds ==
1. (Australia) Storm Hunter / (United States) Desirae Krawczyk (quarterfinals)
2. (Chinese Taipei) Chan Hao-ching / (Australia) Maya Joint (final)
3. (Ukraine) Lyudmyla Kichenok / (Ukraine) Nadiia Kichenok (first round)
4. Maria Kozyreva / (United Kingdom) Maia Lumsden (champions)

== Draw ==
Key

- Q = Qualifier
- WC = Wild card
- LL = Lucky loser
- Alt = Alternate
- ITF = ITF entry
- PR = Protected ranking
- SR = Special ranking
- SE = Special exempt
- JE = Junior exempt
- JR = Junior Accelerator Programme entrant
- CO = College Accelerator Programme entrant
- NG = Next Gen Accelerator Program entrant
- w/o = Walkover
- r = Retired
- d = Defaulted

=== Draw ===
First round
1	(Australia) S Hunter (United States) D Krawczyk	6	5	[12]
(Hong Kong) E Chong (Japan) E Hozumi	2	7	[10]
(Ukraine) Y Starodubtseva (Mexico) R Zarazúa	6	7^{10}
WC	(United States) A Frey (United States) S Stephens	4	6^{8}
4	M Kozyreva (United Kingdom) M Lumsden	6	4	[10]
PR	(Chile) A Guarachi (United States) C Harrison	4	6	[7]
(Slovenia) N Radišić; I Shymanovich	6	6
WC	(United Kingdom) S Johnson (Spain) A Teixidó García	0	2
Alt	(India) A Raina (Australia) A Sharma	4	7^{7}	[10]
(United States) C Corley (United States) I Corley	6	6^{5}	[4]
(Chinese Taipei) I-h Cho (Chinese Taipei) Y-t Cho	4	7	[10]
3	(Ukraine) L Kichenok (Ukraine) N Kichenok	6	5	[6]
(Brazil) I Martins; E Ovcharenko	6	6^{4}	[11]
(Australia) K Birrell (United States) P Stearns	4	7^{7}	[9]
E Alexandrova (Australia) T Gibson
2	(Chinese Taipei) H-c Chan (Australia) M Joint	w/o

Quarterfinals
1	(Australia) S Hunter (United States) D Krawczyk	6	4	[7]
(Ukraine) Y Starodubtseva (Mexico) R Zarazúa	2	6	[10]
4	M Kozyreva (United Kingdom) M Lumsden	6	4	[13]
(Slovenia) N Radišić; I Shymanovich	4	6	[11]
Alt	(India) A Raina (Australia) A Sharma	4	1
(Chinese Taipei) I-h Cho (Chinese Taipei) Y-t Cho	6	6
(Brazil) I Martins; E Ovcharenko	0	2
2	(Chinese Taipei) H-c Chan (Australia) M Joint	6	6

Semifinals
(Ukraine) Y Starodubtseva (Mexico) R Zarazúa
4	M Kozyreva (United Kingdom) M Lumsden	w/o
(Chinese Taipei) I-h Cho (Chinese Taipei) Y-t Cho	3	1
2	(Chinese Taipei) H-c Chan (Australia) M Joint	6	6

Final
4	M Kozyreva (United Kingdom) M Lumsden	7^{8}	6
2	(Chinese Taipei) H-c Chan (Australia) M Joint	6^{6}	3
