= 1985 Virginia Slims of Utah =

- Date: September 9–15
- Edition: 4th
- Category: 1+
- Draw: 32S / 16D
- Prize money: $75,000
- Surface: Carpet / indoor
- Location: Salt Lake City, Utah, U.S.
- Venue: Sports Mall

Champions

Singles
- (United States) Stephanie Rehe

Doubles
- (Soviet Union) Svetlana Parkhomenko / (Soviet Union) Larisa Neiland
- Virginia Slims of Utah

The 1985 Virginia Slims of Utah was a women's tennis tournament played on indoor carpet courts at the Sports Mall in Salt Lake City, Utah, United States that was part of the Category 1+ tier of the 1985 WTA Tour. It was the fourth edition of the tournament and was played from September 9 through September 15, 1985. Sixth-seeded Stephanie Rehe won the singles title.

== Finals ==
=== Singles ===
(United States) Stephanie Rehe defeated (Sweden) Camille Benjamin 6–2, 6–4

- It was Rehe's 1st singles title of her career.

=== Doubles ===
(Soviet Union) Svetlana Parkhomenko / (Soviet Union) Larisa Neiland defeated (South Africa) Rosalyn Fairbank / (South Africa) Beverly Mould 7–5, 6–2
