= 2026 US Open – Women's singles =

Tennis championship

Women's singles
- 2026 US Open

Final
- Champion: (Kazakhstan) Elena Rybakina
- Runner-up: Aryna Sabalenka
- Score: 6–4, 5–7, 6–2
- Date: September 12, 2026

Details
- Draw: 128 (16Q / 8WC)
- Seeds: 32

Events
Singles	men	women		boys	girls
Doubles	men	women	mixed	boys	girls
WC Singles	men	women	quad	boys	girls
WC Doubles	men	women	quad	boys	girls

Qualification
Singles	men	women
- US Open

Elena Rybakina defeated two-time defending champion Aryna Sabalenka in the final, 6–4, 5–7, 6–2 to win the women's singles tennis title at the 2026 US Open. It was her third major title (and second of the season, having also won the Australian Open) and 14th WTA Tour title overall. Rybakina was the sixth women's singles player (since 1988) to win both hardcourt majors in the same year, with Sabalenka and Rybakina also being the first pair of women's singles players to contest both hardcourt major finals in the same year since Steffi Graf and Arantxa Sánchez Vicario in 1994. This was also the first US Open final contested by the top two seeds since 2013.

Rybakina attained the world No. 1 singles ranking for the first time by reaching the semifinals, becoming the 30th player to attain the top ranking and the first Kazakhstani player to achieve a world No. 1 ranking in any discipline. Sabalenka, Jessica Pegula, and Coco Gauff were also in contention for the top ranking at the beginning of the tournament.

Aged 46, Venus Williams was the oldest woman to compete in the US Open singles main draw since Renée Richards in 1981, after receiving a wildcard into the main draw. Starting at 12:13 AM, the first-round match between Williams and Sofia Kenin set the record for the latest start in tournament history, surpassing the previous record (12:08 AM) set by the third-round match between Sabalenka and Ekaterina Alexandrova in 2024. Zheng Qinwen was the first qualifier to reach the quarterfinals since Emma Raducanu in 2021.

All of the top four seeds reached the semifinals for the first time at the US Open since 1975 and at any major since the 2009 Wimbledon Championships. It was also the first time at the US Open since 1998 that the top six seeds reached the quarterfinals. 26 out of the 32 seeds reached the third round, the joint-highest number of seeds at a major since the introduction of the 32-seed system in 2001, equaling the 2007 French Open.

== Seeds ==
1. Aryna Sabalenka (final)
2. (Kazakhstan) Elena Rybakina (champion)
3. (United States) Jessica Pegula (semifinals)
4. (United States) Coco Gauff (semifinals)
5. Mirra Andreeva (quarterfinals)
6. (Czech Republic) Linda Nosková (quarterfinals)
7. (Czech Republic) Karolína Muchová (third round)
8. (Poland) Iga Świątek (fourth round)
9. (Ukraine) Elina Svitolina (third round)
10. (United States) Amanda Anisimova (third round)
11. (Ukraine) Marta Kostyuk (fourth round)
12. (Switzerland) Belinda Bencic (first round)
13. (Japan) Naomi Osaka (fourth round)
14. (United States) Iva Jovic (fourth round)
15. Diana Shnaider (third round)
16. (Romania) Sorana Cîrstea (fourth round)
17. (Philippines) Alexandra Eala (third round)
18. Ekaterina Alexandrova (third round)
19. (Italy) Jasmine Paolini (third round)
20. (Poland) Maja Chwalińska (first round)
21. Anna Kalinskaya (fourth round)
22. (United States) Madison Keys (third round)
23. (Belgium) Elise Mertens (third round)
24. (Austria) Anastasia Potapova (fourth round)
25. (Czech Republic) Marie Bouzková (third round)
26. (United States) Emma Navarro (quarterfinals)
27. (Czech Republic) Barbora Krejčíková (first round)
28. (Czech Republic) Sára Bejlek (first round)
29. (United States) Ann Li (third round)
30. (Latvia) Jeļena Ostapenko (first round)
31. (Canada) Leylah Fernandez (third round)
32. (Greece) Maria Sakkari (second round)

== Draw ==
Key

- Q = Qualifier
- WC = Wild card
- LL = Lucky loser
- Alt = Alternate
- ITF = ITF entry
- PR = Protected ranking
- SR = Special ranking
- SE = Special exempt
- JE = Junior exempt
- JR = Junior Accelerator Programme entrant
- CO = College Accelerator Programme entrant
- NG = Next Gen Accelerator Program entrant
- w/o = Walkover
- r = Retired
- d = Defaulted

=== Finals ===
Quarterfinals
1	Aryna Sabalenka	7^{7}	3	7^{10}
6	(Czech Republic) Linda Nosková	6^{1}	6	6^{7}
3	(United States) Jessica Pegula	3	6	6
26	(United States) Emma Navarro	6	4	3
5	Mirra Andreeva	6	6^{7}	2
4	(United States) Coco Gauff	2	7^{9}	6
Q	(China) Zheng Qinwen	6	1	4
2	(Kazakhstan) Elena Rybakina	3	6	6

Semifinals
1	Aryna Sabalenka	7	6
3	(United States) Jessica Pegula	5	2
4	(United States) Coco Gauff	6	4	4
2	(Kazakhstan) Elena Rybakina	3	6	6

Final
1	Aryna Sabalenka	4	7	2
2	(Kazakhstan) Elena Rybakina	6	5	6

=== Top half ===
==== Section 1 ====
First round
1	A Sabalenka	6	6
(Colombia) C Osorio	2	4
(Mexico) R Zarazúa	6	4	6^{7}
Q	P Iatcenko	4	6	7^{10}
PR	(Japan) A Ito	2	4
(Spain) O Selekhmeteva	6	6
(Uzbekistan) K Rakhimova	7^{7}	6
27	(Czech Republic) B Krejčíková	6^{4}	2
20	(Poland) M Chwalińska	2	3
(United States) T Townsend	6	6
WC	(Australia) T Preston	6	6
(United States) A Parks	3	3
(Belgium) H Vandewinkel	6	5	3
(Czech Republic) Ka Plíšková	2	7	6
(Ukraine) D Snigur	0	4
15	D Shnaider	6	6

Second round
1	A Sabalenka	6	6
Q	P Iatcenko	1	1
(Spain) O Selekhmeteva	3	0
(Uzbekistan) K Rakhimova	6	6
(United States) T Townsend	6	6
WC	(Australia) T Preston	1	1
(Czech Republic) Ka Plíšková	1	6^{4}
15	D Shnaider	6	7^{7}

Third round
1	A Sabalenka	6	6
(Uzbekistan) K Rakhimova	3	4
(United States) T Townsend	6	6^{3}	6
15	D Shnaider	2	7^{7}	3

Fourth round
1	A Sabalenka	6	6
(United States) T Townsend	4	3

==== Section 2 ====
First round
11	(Ukraine) M Kostyuk	6	6
Q	(Australia) S Hunter	4	1
WC	(United States) S Stephens	6	6
(Denmark) C Tauson	4	1
(Australia) K Birrell	3	7^{7}	6
(Croatia) P Marčinko	6	6^{4}	3
(United States) M Kessler	2	2
18	E Alexandrova	6	6
29	(United States) A Li	7	6
(Croatia) A Ružić	5	1
(Australia) T Gibson	2	6	3
(Croatia) D Vekić	6	4	6
Q	(United States) E Kalieva	3	7^{7}	2
(Thailand) L Tararudee	6	6^{4}	6
(United States) K Volynets	5	1
6	(Czech Republic) L Nosková	7	6

Second round
11	(Ukraine) M Kostyuk	6	7
WC	(United States) S Stephens	1	5
(Australia) K Birrell	1	6	3
18	E Alexandrova	6	2	6
29	(United States) A Li	5	7^{7}	6
(Croatia) D Vekić	7	6^{4}	4
(Thailand) L Tararudee	4	2
6	(Czech Republic) L Nosková	6	6

Third round
11	(Ukraine) M Kostyuk	6	6
18	E Alexandrova	3	2
29	(United States) A Li	2	7^{8}	2
6	(Czech Republic) L Nosková	6	6^{6}	6

Fourth round
11	(Ukraine) M Kostyuk	5	7	4
6	(Czech Republic) L Nosková	7	5	6

==== Section 3 ====
First round
3	(United States) J Pegula	6	6
(Romania) E-G Ruse	3	2
WC	(United States) V Williams	2	6^{6}
WC	(United States) S Kenin	6	7^{8}
PR	(Thailand) M Sawangkaew	6	6
(Hungary) P Udvardy	4	3
(China) S Zhang	3	2
31	(Canada) L Fernandez	6	6
19	(Italy) J Paolini	6	3	6
(Slovenia) V Erjavec	3	6	4
Q	(Italy) L Stefanini	6	4	6
(Ukraine) D Yastremska	3	6	1
(Switzerland) V Golubic	5	4
(France) D Parry	7	6
(Austria) J Grabher	3	0
16	(Romania) S Cîrstea	6	6

Second round
3	(United States) J Pegula	6	6
WC	(United States) S Kenin	3	1
PR	(Thailand) M Sawangkaew	4	1
31	(Canada) L Fernandez	6	6
19	(Italy) J Paolini	6	6
Q	(Italy) L Stefanini	4	1
(France) D Parry	2	5
16	(Romania) S Cîrstea	6	7

Third round
3	(United States) J Pegula	1	6	6
31	(Canada) L Fernandez	6	4	3
19	(Italy) J Paolini	3	3
16	(Romania) S Cîrstea	6	6

Fourth round
3	(United States) J Pegula	6	6
16	(Romania) S Cîrstea	3	4

==== Section 4 ====
First round
9	(Ukraine) E Svitolina	6	6
(Argentina) S Sierra	1	2
(Australia) M Joint	3	6	6
L Samsonova	6	2	2
(Colombia) E Arango	4	2
(China) Xin Wang	6	6
A Blinkova	4	3
21	A Kalinskaya	6	6
26	(United States) E Navarro	7^{8}	6^{1}	6
PR	(France) L Boisson	6^{6}	7^{7}	3
Q	(Netherlands) A Koevermans	5	1
(United States) C McNally	7	6
WC	(United States) CYS Lee	4	6	0
(United Kingdom) K Boulter	6	3	6
(Austria) S Kraus	3	0
7	(Czech Republic) K Muchová	6	6

Second round
9	(Ukraine) E Svitolina	6	6^{6}	6
(Australia) M Joint	2	7^{8}	4
(China) Xin Wang	5	6	3
21	A Kalinskaya	7	2	6
26	(United States) E Navarro	3	6	6
(United States) C McNally	6	2	3
(United Kingdom) K Boulter	1	0
7	(Czech Republic) K Muchová	6	6

Third round
9	(Ukraine) E Svitolina	3	6	3
21	A Kalinskaya	6	2	6
26	(United States) E Navarro	6	7
7	(Czech Republic) K Muchová	3	5

Fourth round
21	A Kalinskaya	4	2
26	(United States) E Navarro	6	6

=== Bottom half ===
==== Section 5 ====
First round
5	M Andreeva	6	6
(Indonesia) J Tjen	2	2
Q	(Czech Republic) G Knutson	3	3
(Germany) E Lys	6	6
(Czech Republic) N Bartůňková	6	6
(Egypt) M Sherif	1	2
(Germany) T Maria	4	6	6
30	(Latvia) J Ostapenko	6	1	2
24	(Austria) A Potapova	6	6
LL	(Latvia) D Semeņistaja	2	2
Q	(Netherlands) A Rus	6^{6}	2
WC	(France) L Jeanjean	7^{8}	6
(Austria) L Tagger	6	7^{7}
(Germany) T Korpatsch	0	6^{4}
(United States) A Krueger	1	3
10	(United States) A Anisimova	6	6

Second round
5	M Andreeva	6	6
(Germany) E Lys	0	2
(Czech Republic) N Bartůňková	6^{5}	6	6
(Germany) T Maria	7^{7}	2	3
24	(Austria) A Potapova	6	2	6
WC	(France) L Jeanjean	4	6	3
(Austria) L Tagger	3	6	1
10	(United States) A Anisimova	6	3	6

Third round
5	M Andreeva	6	7^{7}
(Czech Republic) N Bartůňková	2	6^{5}
24	(Austria) A Potapova	6	7
10	(United States) A Anisimova	2	5

Fourth round
5	M Andreeva	5	6	6
24	(Austria) A Potapova	7	4	3

==== Section 6 ====
First round
14	(United States) I Jovic	7	6
(Poland) M Fręch	5	3
(Poland) M Linette	4	6	3
Q	(United Kingdom) F Jones	6	1	6
(Ukraine) O Oliynykova	6	6
WC	(United States) R Brantmeier	4	4
Q	(United States) M Stoiana	1	2
17	(Philippines) A Eala	6	6
28	(Czech Republic) S Bejlek	5	6	1
(Spain) C Bucșa	7	4	6
(Ukraine) A Kalinina	3	3
Q	(Japan) H Sakatsume	6	6
(Australia) D Kasatkina	1	4
(Spain) P Badosa	6	6
(Turkey) Z Sönmez	3	4
4	(United States) C Gauff	6	6

Second round
14	(United States) I Jovic	6	6
Q	(United Kingdom) F Jones	4	4
(Ukraine) O Oliynykova	1	4
17	(Philippines) A Eala	6	6
(Spain) C Bucșa	7^{8}	6^{0}	7^{10}
Q	(Japan) H Sakatsume	6^{6}	7^{7}	6^{6}
(Spain) P Badosa	4	6^{5}
4	(United States) C Gauff	6	7^{7}

Third round
14	(United States) I Jovic	7	3	7
17	(Philippines) A Eala	5	6	5
(Spain) C Bucșa	3	4
4	(United States) C Gauff	6	6

Fourth round
14	(United States) I Jovic	1	4
4	(United States) C Gauff	6	6

==== Section 7 ====
First round
8	(Poland) I Świątek	6	6
(China) Xiy Wang	2	3
PR	(Argentina) N Podoroska	4	7^{7}	6
(Switzerland) S Waltert	6	6^{5}	3
Q	(United Kingdom) H Dart	3	6	6
(United States) P Stearns	6	3	2
(France) E Jacquemot	2	2
25	(Czech Republic) M Bouzková	6	6
22	(United States) M Keys	7	6
A Korneeva	5	4
Q	(Czech Republic) L Havlíčková	3	3
(Hungary) A Bondár	6	6
Q	(China) Q Zheng	4	6	6
Q	K Liutova	6	3	1
(Kazakhstan) Y Putintseva	4	7	6
12	(Switzerland) B Bencic	6	5	3

Second round
8	(Poland) I Świątek	6	6
PR	(Argentina) N Podoroska	3	2
Q	(United Kingdom) H Dart	2	2
25	(Czech Republic) M Bouzková	6	6
22	(United States) M Keys	5	6	7^{10}
(Hungary) A Bondár	7	4	6^{5}
Q	(China) Q Zheng	6	2	6
(Kazakhstan) Y Putintseva	4	6	1

Third round
8	(Poland) I Świątek	7^{7}	7^{7}
25	(Czech Republic) M Bouzková	6^{3}	6^{3}
22	(United States) M Keys	6	6^{3}	5
Q	(China) Q Zheng	1	7^{7}	7

Fourth round
8	(Poland) I Świątek	5	3
Q	(China) Q Zheng	7	6

==== Section 8 ====
First round
13	(Japan) N Osaka	7^{8}	7^{7}
A Zakharova	6^{6}	6^{3}
(Italy) E Cocciaretto	3	2
(Czech Republic) K Siniaková	6	6
Q	(Slovenia) T Zidanšek	3	5
(Uzbekistan) M Timofeeva	6	7
(Spain) K Quevedo	4	4
23	(Belgium) E Mertens	6	6
32	(Greece) M Sakkari	2	7	6
Q	(United States) R Montgomery	6	5	2
(Ukraine) Y Starodubtseva	6	6
(Germany) E Seidel	2	2
(Czech Republic) D Vidmanova	3	4
(Spain) J Bouzas Maneiro	6	6
WC	(United States) T Frodin	3	2
2	(Kazakhstan) E Rybakina	6	6

Second round
13	(Japan) N Osaka	6	5	6
(Czech Republic) K Siniaková	2	7	1
(Uzbekistan) M Timofeeva	2	6^{5}
23	(Belgium) E Mertens	6	7^{7}
32	(Greece) M Sakkari	6	6^{4}	2
(Ukraine) Y Starodubtseva	1	7^{7}	6
(Spain) J Bouzas Maneiro	2	4
2	(Kazakhstan) E Rybakina	6	6

Third round
13	(Japan) N Osaka	6	3	7
23	(Belgium) E Mertens	3	6	5
(Ukraine) Y Starodubtseva	6^{6}	3
2	(Kazakhstan) E Rybakina	7^{8}	6

Fourth round
13	(Japan) N Osaka	1	4
2	(Kazakhstan) E Rybakina	6	6

== Seeded players ==
The following are the seeded players. Seedings are based on WTA rankings as of August 24, 2026. Rankings and points before are as of August 31, 2026.

Because the tournament takes place one week later this year, players are defending points from the 2025 US Open, as well as tournaments that took place during the week of September 8, 2025 (Guadalajara and Ljubljana WTA 125). Points from the 2025 US Open are listed first in the "Points defending" column.

^{‡}	Champion
^{†}	Runner-up

Seed	Rank	Player	Points before	Points defending	Points won	Points after	Status
1	1	Aryna Sabalenka^{†}	8,575	2,000	1,300	7,875	Runner-up, lost to (Kazakhstan) Elena Rybakina [2]
2	2	(Kazakhstan) Elena Rybakina^{‡}	8,141	240	2,000	9,901	Champion, defeated Aryna Sabalenka [1]
3	3	(United States) Jessica Pegula	7,265	780	780	7,265	Semifinals lost to Aryna Sabalenka [1]
4	4	(United States) Coco Gauff	6,704	240	780	7,244	Semifinals lost to (Kazakhstan) Elena Rybakina [2]
5	5	Mirra Andreeva	5,443	130	430	5,743	Quarterfinals lost to (United States) Coco Gauff [4]
6	6	(Czech Republic) Linda Nosková	5,028	130	430	5,328	Quarterfinals lost to Aryna Sabalenka [1]
7	7	(Czech Republic) Karolína Muchová	4,983	430	130	4,683	Third round lost to (United States) Emma Navarro [26]
8	8	(Poland) Iga Świątek	4,809	430	240	4,619	Fourth round lost to (China) Zheng Qinwen [Q]
9	9	(Ukraine) Elina Svitolina	4,689	10	130	4,809	Third round lost to Anna Kalinskaya [21]
10	10	(United States) Amanda Anisimova	4,533	1,300	130	3,363	Third round lost to (Austria) Anastasia Potapova [24]
11	11	(Ukraine) Marta Kostyuk	3,980	240	240	3,980	Fourth round lost to (Czech Republic) Linda Nosková [6]
12	12	(Switzerland) Belinda Bencic	2,995	70	10	2,935	First round lost to (Kazakhstan) Yulia Putintseva
13	13	(Japan) Naomi Osaka	2,846	780	240	2,306	Fourth round lost to (Kazakhstan) Elena Rybakina [2]
14	14	(United States) Iva Jovic	2,671	70+500	240+49	2,390	Fourth round lost to (United States) Coco Gauff [4]
15	16	Diana Shnaider	2.468	10	130	2,588	Third round lost to (United States) Taylor Townsend
16	17	(Romania) Sorana Cîrstea	2,294	70	240	2,464	Fourth round lost to (United States) Jessica Pegula [3]
17	18	(Philippines) Alexandra Eala	2,281	70+125	130+60	2,276	Third round lost to (United States) Iva Jovic [14]
18	19	Ekaterina Alexandrova	2,186	240	130	2,076	Third round lost to (Ukraine) Marta Kostyuk [11]
19	21	(Italy) Jasmine Paolini	2,123	130	130	2,123	Third round lost to (Romania) Sorana Cîrstea [16]
20	22	(Poland) Maja Chwalińska	2,037	20+125+27	10+12+1	1,888	First round lost to (United States) Taylor Townsend
21	23	Anna Kalinskaya	1,933	130	240	2,043	Fourth round lost to (United States) Emma Navarro [26]
22	24	(United States) Madison Keys	1,909	10	130	2,029	Third round lost to (China) Zheng Qinwen [Q]
23	20	(Belgium) Elise Mertens	2,165	130	130	2,165	Third round lost to (Japan) Naomi Osaka [13]
24	25	(Austria) Anastasia Potapova	1,756	70	240	1,926	Fourth round lost to Mirra Andreeva [5]
25	26	(Czech Republic) Marie Bouzková	1,753	10	130	1,873	Third round lost to (Poland) Iga Świątek [8]
26	27	(United States) Emma Navarro	1,724	130	430	2,024	Quarterfinals lost to (United States) Jessica Pegula [3]
27	29	(Czech Republic) Barbora Krejčíková	1,666	430	10	1,246	First round lost to (Uzbekistan) Kamilla Rakhimova
28	30	(Czech Republic) Sára Bejlek	1,652	(30)^{∆}	10	1,632	First round lost to (Spain) Cristina Bucșa
29	28	(United States) Ann Li	1,683	240	130	1,573	Third round lost to (Czech Republic) Linda Nosková [6]
30	32	(Latvia) Jeļena Ostapenko	1,512	70	10	1,452	First round lost to (Germany) Tatjana Maria
31	33	(Canada) Leylah Fernandez	1,454	130	130	1,454	Third round lost to (United States) Jessica Pegula [3]
32	35	(Greece) Maria Sakkari	1,415	130	70	1,355	Second round lost to (Ukraine) Yuliia Starodubtseva

∆ The player did not qualify for the tournament in 2025. Points for her 18th best result will be deducted instead.

=== Withdrawn players ===
The following players would have been seeded, but did not enter or withdrew before the tournament began.

Rank	Player	Points before	Points defending	Points after	Withdrawal reason
15	(Canada) Victoria Mboko	2,531	10	2,521	Left knee injury

== Other entry information ==
=== Wildcards ===
- (United States) Reese Brantmeier
- (United States) Thea Frodin
- (France) Léolia Jeanjean
- (United States) Sofia Kenin
- (United States) Carol Young Suh Lee
- (Australia) Taylah Preston
- (United States) Sloane Stephens
- (United States) Venus Williams

=== Protected ranking ===
- (France) Loïs Boisson (38)
- (Japan) Aoi Ito (87)
- (Thailand) Mananchaya Sawangkaew (100)
- (Argentina) Nadia Podoroska (106)

=== Qualifiers ===
- (United Kingdom) Harriet Dart
- (Czech Republic) Lucie Havlíčková
- (Australia) Storm Hunter
- Polina Iatcenko
- (United Kingdom) Francesca Jones
- (United States) Elvina Kalieva
- (Czech Republic) Gabriela Knutson
- (Netherlands) Anouk Koevermans
- Kristina Liutova
- (United States) Robin Montgomery
- (Netherlands) Arantxa Rus
- (Japan) Himeno Sakatsume
- (Italy) Lucrezia Stefanini
- (United States) Mary Stoiana
- (China) Zheng Qinwen
- (Slovenia) Tamara Zidanšek

=== Lucky loser ===
- (Latvia) Darja Semeņistaja

=== Withdrawals ===
The entry list was released based on the WTA rankings for the week of July 20, 2026.

- † (Canada) Victoria Mboko (12) → replaced by (Thailand) Mananchaya Sawangkaew (100 PR)
- † (United States) Hailey Baptiste (34) → replaced by (Spain) Kaitlin Quevedo (101)
- † (France) Varvara Gracheva (99) → replaced by Anastasia Zakharova (102)
- ‡ (Australia) Ajla Tomljanović (94) → replaced by (Germany) Ella Seidel (103)
- ‡ (Romania) Irina-Camelia Begu (82 PR) → replaced by (France) Elsa Jacquemot (104)
- ‡ (United Kingdom) Emma Raducanu (37) → replaced by Anna Blinkova (105)
- ‡ (Romania) Jaqueline Cristian (41) → replaced by (Czech Republic) Darja Vidmanova (106)
- ‡ (Germany) Laura Siegemund (89) → replaced by (Argentina) Nadia Podoroska (106 PR)
- ‡ (Switzerland) Jil Teichmann (89 PR) → replaced by (Austria) Julia Grabher (107)
- § (Czech Republic) Tereza Valentová (64) → replaced by (Latvia) Darja Semeņistaja (LL)

† – not included on entry list
‡ – withdrew from entry list
§ – withdrew from main draw

Preceded by 2026 Wimbledon Championships – Women's singles	Grand Slam women's singles	Succeeded by 2027 Australian Open – Women's singles
