= List of female players who have won at least one Tour-level title =

This is a list of female tennis players who meet one or more of the following criteria:

- Singles:
  - Won at least one official Women's Tennis Association tournament.
  - Won at least one Grand Slam (tennis).
  - Won gold medal Olympic Games in singles.
  - Won at least one title on the Virginia Slims Circuit.

== List ==
Name	Nationality	Birth	Death	Number of singles titles	Grand Slam Title
Ekaterina Alexandrova	(Russia)	1994		5	
Leslie Allen	(United States)	1957		1	
Bianca Andreescu	(Canada)	2000		3	1
Mirra Andreeva	(Russia)	2007		6	1
Amanda Anisimova	(United States)	2001		4	
Sabine Appelmans	(Belgium)	1972		7	
Gréta Arn	(Hungary)	1979		2	
Lara Arruabarrena	(Spain)	1992		2	
Sofia Arvidsson	(Sweden)	1984		2	
Tracy Austin	(United States)	1962		30	2
Victoria Azarenka	(Belarus)	1989		21	2
Tímea Babos	(Hungary)	1993		3	
Timea Bacsinszky	(Switzerland)	1989		4	
Paula Badosa	(Spain)	1997		4	
Sybille Bammer	(Austria)	1980		2	
Sue Barker	(United Kingdom)	1956		15	
Mona Barthel	(Germany)	1990		4	
Marion Bartoli	(France)	1984		8	1
Ashleigh Barty	(Australia)	1996		15	3
Carling Bassett	(Canada)	1967		2	
Yayuk Basuki	(Indonesia)	1970		6	
Annika Beck	(Germany)	1994		2	
Dája Bedáňová	(Czech Republic)	1983		1	
Irina-Camelia Begu	(Romania)	1990		5	
Sára Bejlek	(Czech Republic)	2006		1	
Belinda Bencic	(Switzerland)	1997		10	
Iveta Benešová	(Czech Republic)	1983		2	
Kiki Bertens	(Netherlands)	1991		10	
Margarita Betova	(Russia)	1994		2	
Cara Black	(Zimbabwe)	1973		1	
Anna Blinkova	(Russia)	1998		2	
Radka Bobková	(Czech Republic)	1973		2	
Lisa Bonder	(United States)	1965		4	
Alona Bondarenko	(Ukraine)	1984		2	
Kateryna Bondarenko	(Ukraine)	1986		2	
Manon Bollegraf	(Netherlands)	1964		1	
Federica Bonsignori	(Italy)	1967		1	
Linky Boshoff	(South Africa)	1956		1	
Eugenie Bouchard	(Canada)	1994		1	
Katie Boulter	(United Kingdom)	1996		4	
Marie Bouzková	(Czech Republic)	1998		4	
Elena Bovina	(Russia)	1983		3	
Jennifer Brady	(United States)	1995		1	
Nicole Bradtke	(Australia)	1969		3	
Kristina Brandi	(Puerto Rico)	1977		1	
Alberta Brianti	(Italy)	1980		1	
Lucia Bronzetti	(Italy)	1998		1	
Bettina Bunge	(Germany)	1963		4	
Elise Burgin	(United States)	1962		1	
Çağla Büyükakçay	(Turkey)	1989		1	
Mihaela Buzărnescu	(Romania)	1988		1	
Sandra Cacic	(United States)	1974		1	
Jennifer Capriati	(United States)	1976		14	3
Åsa Carlsson	(Sweden)	1975		2	
Rosie Casals	(United States)	1948		9	
Myriam Casanova	(Switzerland)	1985		1	
Sandra Cecchini	(Italy)	1965		12	
Anna Chakvetadze	(Russia)	1987		8	
Dominika Cibulková	(Slovakia)	1989		8	
Halle Cioffi	(United States)	1969		1	
Sorana Cîrstea	(Romania)	1990		4	
Kim Clijsters	(Belgium)	1983		41	4
Elisabetta Cocciaretto	(Italy)	2001		2	
Amanda Coetzer	(South Africa)	1971		9	
Danielle Collins	(United States)	1993		4	
Belinda Cordwell	(Australia)	1965		1	
Alizé Cornet	(France)	1990		6	
Margaret Court	(Australia)	1942		92	24
Jill Craybas	(United States)	1974		1	
Annabel Croft	(United Kingdom)	1966		1	
Isabel Cueto	(Germany)	1968		5	
Brigitte Cuypers	(South Africa)	1955		3	
Cecilia Dahlman	(Sweden)	1968		2	
Eleni Daniilidou	(Greece)	1982		5	
Olga Danilović	(Serbia)	2001		2	
Kimiko Date-Krumm	(Japan)	1970		8	
Lindsay Davenport	(United States)	1976		55	3
Lauren Davis	(United States)	1993		2	
Nathalie Dechy	(France)	1979		1	
Elena Dementieva	(Russia)	1981		16	
Isabelle Demongeot	(France)	1966		1	
Mariaan de Swardt	(South Africa)	1971		1	
Niege Dias	(Brazil)	1966		2	
Zarina Diyas	(Kazakhstan)	1993		1	
Océane Dodin	(France)	1996		1	
Misaki Doi	(Japan)	1991		1	
Jelena Dokić	(Serbia) (Australia)	1983		6	
Lourdes Domínguez Lino	(Spain)	1981		2	
Ruxandra Dragomir	(Romania)	1972		4	
Lilian Drescher	(Switzerland)	1965		1	
Duan Yingying	(China)	1989		1	
Lee Duk-hee	(South Korea)	1953		1	
Alexandra Dulgheru	(Romania)	1989		2	
Gisela Dulko	(Argentina)	1985		4	
Laura duPont	(United States)	1949	2002	1	
Mariana Duque Mariño	(Colombia)	1989		1	
Jo Durie	(United Kingdom)	1960		2	
Françoise Dürr	(France)	1942			
Vera Dushevina	(Russia)	1986		1	
Mana Endo	(Japan)	1971		1	
Marina Erakovic	(New Zealand)	1988		1	
Sara Errani	(Italy)	1987		9	
Chris Evert	(United States)	1954		157	18
Rosalyn Fairbank	(South Africa)	1960		1	
Silvia Farina Elia	(Italy)	1972		3	
Patty Fendick	(United States)	1965		3	
Gigi Fernández	(United States)	1964		2	
Mary Joe Fernández	(United States)	1971		7	
Leylah Fernandez	(Canada)	2002		5	
Fiona Ferro	(France)	1997		2	
Kirsten Flipkens	(Belgium)	1986		1	
Dianne Fromholtz	(Australia)	1956		8	
Amy Frazier	(United States)	1972		8	
Linda Fruhvirtová	(Czech Republic)	2005		1	
Bonnie Gadusek	(United States)	1963		5	
Tathiana Garbin	(Italy)	1977		1	
Caroline Garcia	(France)	1993		11	
Zina Garrison-Jackson	(United States)	1963		14	
Coco Gauff	(United States)	2004		12	2
Adriana Gerši	(Czech Republic)	1976		1	
Dana Gilbert	(United States)	1959		2	
Laura Gildemeister	(Peru)	1964		4	
Camila Giorgi	(Italy)	1991		4	
Sabrina Goleš	(Croatia)	1965		1	
Tatiana Golovin	(France)	1988		2	
Viktorija Golubic	(Switzerland)	1992		1	
Evonne Goolagong Cawley	(Australia)	1951		68	7
Sara Gomer	(United Kingdom)	1964		1	
Julia Görges	(Germany)	1988		7	
Steffi Graf	(West Germany) (Germany)	1969		107	22
Rita Grande	(Italy)	1975		3	
Anna-Lena Grönefeld	(Germany)	1985		1	
Marzia Grossi	(Italy)	1970		1	
Zsófia Gubacsi	(Hungary)	1981		1	
Melissa Gurney	(United States)	1969		2	
Karina Habšudová	(Czechoslovakia) (Czech Republic)	1973		1	
Sabine Hack	(West Germany) (Germany)	1969		4	
Beatriz Haddad Maia	(Brazil)	1996		4	
Elly Hakami	(United States)			1	
Julie Halard-Decugis	(France)	1970		12	
Simona Halep	(Romania)	1991		24	2
Sylvia Hanika	(West Germany)	1959		6	
Daniela Hantuchová	(Slovakia)	1983		7	
Federica Haumüller	(Argentina)	1972		1	
Ginger Helgeson	(United States)	1968		1	
Justine Henin	(Belgium)	1982		43	7
Polona Hercog	(Slovenia)	1991		3	
Beth Herr	(United States)	1964		1	
Nathalie Herreman	(France)	1966		1	
Jill Hetherington	(Canada)	1964		1	
Nao Hibino	(Japan)	1994		3	
Martina Hingis	(Switzerland)	1980		43	5
Anne Hobbs	(United Kingdom)	1959		2	
Kathleen Horvath	(United States)	1965		6	
Hsieh Su-wei	(Chinese Taipei)	1986		3	
Anke Huber	(Germany)	1974		12	
Petra Huber	(Austria)	1966		1	
Patricia Hy	(Hong Kong) (Canada)	1965		1	
Etsuko Inoue	(Japan)	1964		2	
Ana Ivanovic	(Serbia)	1987		15	1
Ons Jabeur	(Tunisia)	1994		5	
Andrea Jaeger	(United States)	1965		10	
Jelena Janković	(Serbia)	1985		15	
Mima Jaušovec	(Socialist Federal Republic of Yugoslavia)	1956		5	1
Monique Javer	(United Kingdom)	1967		1	
Catrin Jexell	(Sweden)	1963		1	
Ann Jones	(United Kingdom)	1938			
Barbara Jordan	(United States)	1957		1	1
Kathy Jordan	(United States)	1959		3	
Bojana Jovanovski	(Serbia)	1991		2	
Kaia Kanepi	(Estonia)	1985		4	
Daria Kasatkina	(Russia)	1997		8	
Helen Kelesi	(Canada)	1969		2	
Sofia Kenin	(United States)	1998		5	1
Angelique Kerber	(Germany)	1988		14	3
Madison Keys	(United States)	1995		11	1
Claudia Kohde-Kilsch	(Germany)	1963		8	
Billie Jean King	(United States)	1943		67	8
Vania King	(United States)	1989		1	
Maria Kirilenko	(Russia)	1987		6	
Ann Kiyomura	(United States)	1955		1	
Alisa Kleybanova	(Russia)	1989		2	
Jenny Klitch	(United States)	1965		1	
Karin Knapp	(Italy)	1987		2	
Ana Konjuh	(Croatia)	1997		1	
Johanna Konta	(United Kingdom)	1991		4	
Anett Kontaveit	(Estonia)	1995		6	
Tamara Korpatsch	(Germany)	1995		1	
Marta Kostyuk	(Ukraine)	2002		3	
Michaëlla Krajicek	(Netherlands)	1989		3	
Karen Krantzcke	(Australia)	1946	1977		
Barbora Krejčíková	(Czech Republic)	1995		9	2
Anne Kremer	(Luxembourg)	1975		2	
Ashlyn Krueger	(United States)	2004		2	
Joannette Kruger	(South Africa)	1973		2	
Aleksandra Krunić	(Serbia)	1993		1	
Veronika Kudermetova	(Russia)	1997		2	
Alla Kudryavtseva	(Russia)	1987		1	
Rita Kuti-Kis	(Hungary)	1978		1	
Svetlana Kuznetsova	(Russia)	1985		18	2
Petra Kvitová	(Czech Republic)	1990		31	2
Bianka Lamade	(Germany)	1982		1	
Petra Langrová	(Czech Republic)	1970		1	
Johanna Larsson	(Sweden)	1988		2	
Andrea Leand	(United States)	1964		1	
Gala León García	(Spain)	1973		1	
Susan Leo	(Australia)	1962		1	
Ann Li	(United States)	2000		2	
Li Na	(China)	1982		9	2
Elena Likhovtseva	(Soviet Union) (Commonwealth of Independent States) (Kazakhstan) (Russia)	1975		3	
Catarina Lindqvist	(Sweden)	1963		5	
Magda Linette	(Poland)	1992		2	
Sabine Lisicki	(Germany)	1989		4	
Claire Liu	(United States)	2000		1	
Nuria Llagostera Vives	(Spain)	1980		2	
Émilie Loit	(France)	1979		3	
Peanut Louie	(United States)	1960		4	
Marcie Louie	(United States)	1953		1	
Mirjana Lučić-Baroni	(Croatia)	1982		3	
Gretchen Magers	(United States)	1964		3	
Iva Majoli	(Socialist Federal Republic of Yugoslavia) (Croatia)	1977		8	1
Ekaterina Makarova	(Russia)	1988		3	
Katerina Maleeva	(Bulgaria)	1969		11	
Magdalena Maleeva	(Bulgaria)	1975		10	
Manuela Maleeva-Fragnière	(Bulgaria) (Switzerland)	1967		19	
Hana Mandlíková	(Czech Republic)	1962		27	4
Stacy Margolin	(United States)	1959		1	
Petra Marčinko	(Croatia)	2005		1	
Tatjana Maria	(Germany)	1987		3	
Regina Maršíková	(Czech Republic)	1958		11	
Petra Martić	(Czech Republic)	1991		2	
Veronika Martinek	(Germany)	1972		1	
Conchita Martínez	(Spain)	1972		33	1
María José Martínez Sánchez	(Spain)	1982		5	
Marion Maruska	(Austria)	1972		1	
Helga Masthoff	(West Germany)	1941			
Maja Matevžič	(Slovenia)	1980		1	
Amélie Mauresmo	(France)	1979		25	2
Kathy May	(United States)	1956		7	
Meredith McGrath	(United States)	1971		3	
Christina McHale	(United States)	1992		1	
Lori McNeil	(United States)	1963		10	
Anabel Medina Garrigues	(Spain)	1982		11	
Natalia Medvedeva	(Soviet Union) (Commonwealth of Independent States)	1971		4	
Kerry Melville	(Australia)	1947		22	1
Leila Meskhi	(Soviet Union) (Commonwealth of Independent States) (Georgia (country))	1968		5	
Elise Mertens	(Belgium)	1995		8	
Marcella Mesker	(Netherlands)	1959		1	
Yvonne Meusberger	(Austria)	1983		1	
Marie-Gayanay Mikaelian	(Switzerland)	1984		1	
Anne Minter	(Australia)	1963		4	
Sania Mirza	(India)	1986		1	
Kristina Mladenovic	(France)	1993		1	
Alicia Molik	(Australia)	1981		5	
Robin Montgomery	(United States)	2004		1	
Ángeles Montolio	(Spain)	1975		3	
Corina Morariu	(United States)	1978		1	
Akiko Morigami	(Japan)	1980		1	
Olga Morozova	(Soviet Union)	1949		8	
Alycia Moulton	(United States)	1961		2	
Karolína Muchová	(Czech Republic)	1996		3	
Garbiñe Muguruza	(Spain)	1993		10	2
Martina Müller	(Germany)	1982		1	
Jennifer Mundel-Reinbold	(South Africa)	1962		1	
Anastasia Myskina	(Russia)	1981		10	1
Betsy Nagelsen	(United States)	1956		4	
Henrieta Nagyová	(Slovakia)	1978		9	
Kurumi Nara	(Japan)	1991		1	
Emma Navarro	(United States)	2001		3	
Martina Navratilova	(Czechoslovakia) (United States)	1956		167	18
Larisa Neiland	(Soviet Union) (Ukraine) (Latvia)	1966		2	
Vicki Nelson-Dunbar	(United States)	1962		1	
Janet Newberry	(United States)	1953		2	
Monica Niculescu	(Romania)	1987		3	
Linda Nosková	(Czech Republic)	2004		3	1
Jana Novotná	(Czechoslovakia) (Czech Republic)	1968	2017	24	1
Mariana Díaz Oliva	(Argentina)	1976		1	
Kumiko Okamoto	(Japan)	1965		1	
Chris O'Neil	(Australia)	1956		1	1
Naomi Osaka	(Japan)	1997		7	4
Camila Osorio	(Colombia)	2001		3	
Jeļena Ostapenko	(Latvia)	1997		9	1
Melanie Oudin	(United States)	1991		1	
Barbara Paulus	(Austria)	1970		6	
Jasmine Paolini	(Italy)	1996		3	
Alycia Parks	(United States)	1996		1	
Pauline Parmentier	(France)	1986		4	
Tamira Paszek	(Austria)	1990		3	
Anastasia Pavlyuchenkova	(Russia)	1991		12	
Mercedes Paz	(Argentina)	1966		3	
Shahar Pe'er	(Israel)	1987		5	
Jessica Pegula	(United States)	1994		11	
Peng Shuai	(China)	1986		2	
Flavia Pennetta	(Italy)	1982		11	1
Bernarda Pera	(United States)	1994		2	
Teliana Pereira	(Brazil)	1988		2	
Ksenia Pervak	(Russia)	1991		1	
Květa Peschke	(Czech Republic)	1975		1	
Rebecca Peterson	(Sweden)	1995		2	
Andrea Petkovic	(Germany)	1987		7	
Nadia Petrova	(Russia)	1982		13	
Eva Pfaff	(Germany)	1961		1	
Mary Lou Piatek-Daniels	(United States)	1961		2	
Katia Piccolini	(Italy)	1973		1	
Mary Pierce	(France)	1975		18	2
Marie Pinterová	(Czechoslovakia) (Hungary)	1946		2	
Tsvetana Pironkova	(Bulgaria)	1987		1	
Tina Pisnik	(Slovenia)	1981		1	
Sarah Pitkowski	(France)	1975		1	
Gloria Pizzichini	(Italy)	1975		1	
Karolina Plíšková	(Czech Republic)	1992		17	
Anastasia Potapova	(Russia)	2001		3	
Barbara Potter	(United States)	1961		6	
Nicole Pratt	(Australia)	1973		1	
Wiltrud Probst	(Germany) (West Germany)	1969		2	
Monica Puig	(Puerto Rico)	1993		1	
Ginny Purdy	(United States)	1966		1	
Yulia Putintseva	(Kazakhstan)	1995		2	
Karine Quentrec	(France)	1969		1	
Emma Raducanu	(United Kingdom)	2002		1	1
Agnieszka Radwańska	(Poland)	1989		20	
Tiantsoa Rakotomanga Rajaonah	(France)	2005		1	
Lisa Raymond	(United States)	1973		4	
Virginie Razzano	(France)	1983		2	
Raffaella Reggi	(Italy)	1965		5	
Stephanie Rehe	(United States)	1969		5	
Elna Reinach	(South Africa)	1968		1	
Aravane Rezaï	(France)	1987		4	
Nancy Richey	(United States)	1942		69	2
Ludmila Richterová	(Czech Republic)	1977		1	
Kathy Rinaldi	(United States)	1967		3	
Alison Riske-Amritraj	(United States)	1990		3	
Barbara Rittner	(Germany)	1973		2	
Virginia Ruano Pascual	(Spain)	1973		3	
Chanda Rubin	(United States)	1976		7	
Arantxa Rus	(Netherlands)	1990		1	
Virginia Ruzici	(Romania)	1955		12	1
Elena-Gabriela Ruse	(Romania)	1997		1	
JoAnne Russell	(United States)	1954		2	
Elena Rybakina	(Kazakhstan)	1999		13	2
Magdaléna Rybáriková	(Slovakia)	1988		4	
Aryna Sabalenka	(Belarus)	1998		24	4
Gabriela Sabatini	(Argentina)	1970		27	1
Lucie Šafářová	(Czech Republic)	1987		7	
Dinara Safina	(Russia)	1986		12	
Maria Sakkari	(Greece)	1995		2	
Liudmila Samsonova	(Russia)	1998		5	
María Sánchez Lorenzo	(Spain)	1977		1	
Arantxa Sánchez Vicario	(Spain)	1971		29	4
Mara Santangelo	(Italy)	1981		1	
Daria Saville	(Australia)	1994		1	
Naoko Sawamatsu	(Japan)	1973		4	
Claudine Schaul	(Luxembourg)	1983		1	
Chanelle Scheepers	(South Africa)	1984		1	
Barbara Schett	(Austria)	1976		3	
Francesca Schiavone	(Italy)	1980		8	1
Brenda Schultz-McCarthy	(Netherlands)	1970		7	
Anna Karolína Schmiedlová	(Slovakia)	1994		3	
Patty Schnyder	(Switzerland)	1978		11	
Monica Seles	(Socialist Federal Republic of Yugoslavia) (United States)	1973		53	9
Magüi Serna	(Spain)	1979		3	
Milagros Sequera	(Venezuela)	1980		1	
Anastasija Sevastova	(Latvia)	1990		4	
Barbara Schett	(Austria)	1976		3	
Åsa Svensson	(Sweden)	1975		2	
Kim Shaefer	(United States)	1957		1	
Maria Sharapova	(Russia)	1987		36	5
Astra Sharma	(Australia)	1995		1	
Meghann Shaughnessy	(United States)	1979		6	
Mayar Sherif	(Egypt)	1996		2	
Pam Shriver	(United States)	1962		21	
Yaroslava Shvedova	(Russia) (Kazakhstan)	1987		1	
Laura Siegemund	(Germany)	1988		2	
Mariana Simionescu	(Romania)	1956		1	
Susan Sloane	(United States)	1970		1	
Kateřina Siniaková	(Czech Republic)	1996		5	
Anna Smashnova	(Israel)	1976		12	
Elizabeth Smylie	(Australia)	1963		3	
Tara Snyder	(United States)	1977		1	
Sara Sorribes Tormo	(Spain)	1996		2	
Debbie Spence	(United States)	1967		1	
Irina Spîrlea	(Romania)	1974		4	
Katarina Srebotnik	(Slovenia)	1981		4	
Shaun Stafford	(United States)	1968		1	
Sloane Stephens	(United States)	1993		7	1
Greer Stevens	(South Africa)	1957		4	
Caroline Stoll	(United States)	1960		5	
Samantha Stosur	(Australia)	1984		9	1
Barbora Strýcová	(Czech Republic)	1986		2	
Paola Suárez	(Argentina)	1976		4	
Carla Suárez Navarro	(Spain)	1988		2	
Martina Suchá	(Slovakia)	1980		2	
Helena Suková	(Czech Republic)	1965		10	
Ai Sugiyama	(Japan)	1975		6	
Sun Tiantian	(China)	1981		1	
Eva Švíglerová	(Czechoslovakia) (Czech Republic)	1971		1	
Elina Svitolina	(Ukraine)	1994		20	
Iga Świątek	(Poland)	2001		26	6
Ágnes Szávay	(Hungary)	1988		5	
Silvija Talaja	(Socialist Federal Republic of Yugoslavia) (Croatia)	1978		2	
Tamarine Tanasugarn	(Thailand)	1977		4	
Catherine Tanvier	(France)	1965		1	
Clara Tauson	(Denmark)	2002		3	
Nathalie Tauziat	(France)	1967		8	
Jil Teichmann	(Switzerland)	1997		2	
Andrea Temesvári	(Hungary)	1966		5	
Sandrine Testud	(France)	1972		3	
Janine Thompson	(Australia)	1967		1	
Leigh-Anne Thompson	(United States)	1964		1	
Patricia Maria Țig	(Romania)	1994		1	
Maria Timofeeva	(Russia) (Uzbekistan)	2003		1	
Renáta Tomanová	(Czechoslovakia)	1954		4	
Cristina Torrens Valero	(Spain)	1974		2	
Michelle Torres	(United States)	1967		1	
María Teresa Torró Flor	(Spain)	1992		1	
Martina Trevisan	(Italy)	1993		1	
Lesia Tsurenko	(Ukraine)	1989		4	
Meilen Tu	(United States)	1978		1	
Linda Tuero	(United States)	1950		4	
Iroda Tulyaganova	(Uzbekistan)	1982		3	
Wendy Turnbull	(Australia)	1952		11	
Nicole Vaidišová	(Czech Republic)	1989		6	
Noëlle van Lottum	(Netherlands) (France)	1972		1	
Dianne Van Rensburg	(South Africa)	1968		1	
Dominique Van Roost	(Belgium)	1973		4	
Alison Van Uytvanck	(Belgium)	1994		5	
CoCo Vandeweghe	(United States)	1991		2	
Donna Vekić	(Croatia)	1996		5	
Yvonne Vermaak	(South Africa)	1956		1	
Elena Vesnina	(Russia)	1986		3	
Roberta Vinci	(Italy)	1983		10	
Markéta Vondroušová	(Czech Republic)	1999		3	1
Virginia Wade	(United Kingdom)	1945		55	3
Elena Wagner	(Bulgaria)	1972		1	
Shi-Ting Wang	(Chinese Taipei)	1973		6	
Wang Qiang	(China)	1992		2	
Wang Xiyu	(China)	2001		1	
Wang Yafan	(China)	1994		1	
Patricia Wartusch	(Austria)	1978		2	
Heather Watson	(United Kingdom)	1992		4	
Anne White	(United States)	1961		1	
Robin White	(United States)			2	
Wendy White	(United States)	1960		1	
Yanina Wickmayer	(Belgium)	1989		5	
Angelique Widjaja	(Indonesia)	1984		2	
Judith Wiesner	(Austria)	1966		5	
Linda Wild	(United States)	1971		5	
Serena Williams	(United States)	1981		73	23
Venus Williams	(United States)	1980		49	7
Carina Witthöft	(Germany)	1995		1	
Jarmila Wolfe	(Australia)	1987		2	
Caroline Wozniacki	(Denmark)	1990		30	1
Aleksandra Wozniak	(Canada)	1987		1	
Yan Zi	(China)	1984		1	
Dayana Yastremska	(Ukraine)	2000		3	
Maryna Zanevska	(Belgium)	1993		1	
Klára Zakopalová	(Czech Republic)	1982		3	
Emanuela Zardo	(Switzerland)	1970		1	
Zhang Shuai	(China)	1989		3	
Zheng Jie	(China)	1983		4	
Zheng Qinwen	(China)	2002		5	
Zheng Saisai	(China)	1994		1	
Zhu Lin	(China)	1994		1	
Tamara Zidanšek	(Slovenia)	1997		1	
Radka Zrubáková	(Slovakia)	1970		3	
Fabiola Zuluaga	(Colombia)	1979		5	
Natasha Zvereva	(Soviet Union) (Commonwealth of Independent States) (Belarus)	1971		4	
Vera Zvonareva	(Russia)	1983		12	

== See also ==
- Lists of tennis players
- Lists of sportspeople
- List of WTA number 1 ranked singles tennis players
- List of WTA number 1 ranked doubles tennis players
- Top ten ranked female tennis players
- Top ten ranked female tennis players (1921–1974)
- List of Grand Slam women's singles champions
