= Memphis Classic (tennis) =

WTA Tour
- Event name: The Memphis Classic
- Founded: 2026
- Editions: 1
- Location: Memphis, Tennessee; United States
- Venue: Leftwich Tennis Center
- Category: WTA 250
- Surface: Hard
- Draw: 32S / 19Q / 16D
- Prize money: $283,347

Current champions (2026)
- Singles: Kristina Liutova
- Doubles: Maria Kozyreva (United Kingdom) Maia Lumsden

The Memphis Classic is a professional WTA 250 tennis tournament on the WTA Tour, played on outdoor hardcourts at the Leftwich Tennis Center in Memphis, Tennessee. This event marked the first WTA event in Memphis since 2013, when the women's event in the U.S. National Indoor Championships was last played. The event replaced the Tennis in the Land tournament in Cleveland on the WTA calendar in 2026.

== Past finals ==
=== Singles ===
Year	Champion	Runner-up	Score
2026	Kristina Liutova	(Czech Republic) Darja Vidmanova	1–6, 6–1, 6–3

=== Doubles ===
Year	Champions	Runners-up	Score
2026	Maria Kozyreva (United Kingdom) Maia Lumsden	(Chinese Taipei) Chan Hao-ching (Australia) Maya Joint	7–6^{(8–6)}, 6–3

== See also ==
- Memphis Open (tennis) - former ATP indoor event
- U.S. National Indoor Championships - former ATP and WTA indoor event
