= Darja Viďmanova =

Czech tennis player (born 2003)

- Native name: Дарья Видманова
- Country (sports): Czech Republic
- Born: 9 January 2003 (age 23) Moscow, Russia
- Height: 1.82 m (6 ft 0 in)
- Plays: Right (two-handed backhand)
- College: University of Georgia
- Prize money: US$ 567,039

Singles
- Career record: 152–80
- Career titles: 1 WTA 125
- Highest ranking: No. 75 (31 August 2026)
- Current ranking: No. 75 (31 August 2026)

Grand Slam singles results
- Australian Open: Q3 (2026)
- French Open: Q1 (2026)
- Wimbledon: 1R (2026)
- US Open: 1R (2026)

Doubles
- Career record: 36–23
- Career titles: 5 ITF
- Highest ranking: No. 191 (8 June 2026)
- Current ranking: No. 256 (31 August 2026)

Grand Slam doubles results
- US Open: 1R (2026)
- Last updated on: 7 September 2026.

Darja "Dasha" Viďmanova (born 9 January 2003) is a Czech professional tennis player. She has a career-high singles ranking by the WTA of world No. 75, achieved on 31 August 2026, and a best doubles ranking of No. 191, reached on 8 June 2026.

Viďmanova played college tennis at the University of Georgia.

== College ==
She played for the Georgia Bulldogs, winning the NCAA's 2024 doubles tournament and the 2025 singles event. Vidmanova was named the 2025 Honda Sports Award winner in tennis and the SEC Female Athlete of the Year.

== Personal life ==
Born in Moscow, Russia, Viďmanova moved with her family to the Czech Republic at the age of five and in 2016 became a Czech citizen.

== Career ==
=== 2020–2021: Juniors, WTA Tour debut in doubles ===
As a junior tennis player, she reached her highest combined ranking of No. 21 on 4 January 2021.

Juniors Grand Slam - Singles:

- Australian Open: 3R (2020)
- French Open: 3R (2020, 2021)
- Wimbledon: 2R (2021)

Juniors Grand Slam - Doubles:

- Australian Open: 2R (2020)
- French Open: 1R (2021)
- Wimbledon: QF (2021)

Viďmanova made her WTA Tour main-draw debut at the 2020 Prague Open, having received a wildcard for the doubles event, partnering Linda Fruhvirtová.

=== 2025–2026: WTA 1000, major and top 100 debuts ===
In the end of May 2025, Viďmanova won W35 tournament in Santo Domingo which started her 15 matches long winning streak which included her first W75 title in Sumter and her first W100 title in Cary. Viďmanova then made her WTA 125 singles main-draw debut in Newport but she lost in the first round to eventual champion, Caty McNally.

In July, Viďmanova reached her second career W100 final in Evansville but lost to eventual champion Caty McNally again.

At US Open, she entered her first Grand Slam qualification draw. She won the opening round against local wildcard Maya Iyengar but lost in the next round to former world No. 22, Zhang Shuai, in straight sets. Viďmanova then enter qualification at WTA 500 event in Guadalajara where she beat Emina Bektas and Ena Shibahara in straight sets to make her WTA Tour main-draw singles debut. She claimed her first tour-level win against seventh seed and world No. 58, Alycia Parks, in straight sets, before losing to fellow Czech player, wildcard entrant Nikola Bartůňková. She also entered doubles draw with Alana Smith and scored her first win to reach her first tour-level quarterfinal in doubles.

In March 2026, she qualified at Indian Wells making her WTA 1000-level main-draw debut. She received a wildcard for the main draw of the 2026 Miami Open.

In June, following her title at the Figueira da Foz Open, she reached the top 100, on 22 June 2026. Ranked at a career-high of No. 90, she entered the 2026 Wimbledon Championships, making her major singles main-draw debut, losing to fourth seed Jessica Pegula in the first round.

== Performance timelines ==
Key
| W | F | SF | QF | #R | RR | Q# | P# | DNQ | A | Z# | PO | G | S | B | NMS | NTI | P | NH |

(W) winner; (F) finalist; (SF) semifinalist; (QF) quarterfinalist; (#R) rounds 4, 3, 2, 1; (RR) round-robin stage; (Q#) qualification round; (P#) preliminary round; (DNQ) did not qualify; (A) absent; (Z#) Davis/Fed Cup Zonal Group (with number indication) or (PO) play-off; (G) gold, (S) silver or (B) bronze Olympic/Paralympic medal; (NMS) not a Masters tournament; (NTI) not a Tier I tournament; (P) postponed; (NH) not held; (SR) strike rate (events won / competed); (W–L) win–loss record.
To avoid confusion and double counting, these charts are updated at the conclusion of a tournament or when the player's participation has ended.

Only main-draw results in WTA Tour, Grand Slam tournaments, Billie Jean King Cup, United Cup, Hopman Cup and Olympic Games are included in win–loss records.

=== Singles ===
Current through the 2026 China Open.

| Tournament | 2025 | 2026 | SR | W–L | Win% |
|---|---|---|---|---|---|
Grand Slam tournaments
| Australian Open | A | Q3 | 0 / 0 | 0–0 | – |
| French Open | A | Q1 | 0 / 0 | 0–0 | – |
| Wimbledon | A | 1R | 0 / 1 | 0–1 | 0% |
| US Open | Q2 | 1R | 0 / 1 | 0–1 | 0% |
| Win–Loss | 0–0 | 0–2 | 0 / 2 | 0–2 | 0% |
WTA 1000 tournaments
| Qatar Open | A | A | 0 / 0 | 0–0 | – |
| Dubai Championships | A | A | 0 / 0 | 0–0 | – |
| Indian Wells Open | A | 1R | 0 / 1 | 0–1 | 0% |
| Miami Open | A | 1R | 0 / 1 | 0–1 | 0% |
| Madrid Open | A | Q2 | 0 / 0 | 0–0 | – |
| Italian Open | A | A | 0 / 0 | 0–0 | – |
| Canadian Open | A | A | 0 / 0 | 0–0 | – |
| Cincinnati Open | A | 1R | 0 / 1 | 0–1 | 0% |
| China Open | A | 1R | 0 / 1 | 0–1 | 0% |
| Wuhan Open | A | | 0 / 0 | 0–0 | – |
| Win–Loss | 0–0 | 0–4 | 0 / 4 | 0–4 | 0% |
Career statistics
| | 2025 | 2026 | SR | W–L | Win % |
| Tournaments | 1 | 11 | Career total: 12 | | |
| Titles | 0 | 0 | Career total: 0 | | |
| Finals | 0 | 1 | Career total: 1 | | |
| Hard Win–Loss | 1–1 | 6–9 | 0 / 10 | 7–10 | 41% |
| Clay Win–Loss | 0–0 | 0–1 | 0 / 1 | 0–1 | 0% |
| Grass Win–Loss | 0–0 | 0–1 | 0 / 1 | 0–1 | 0% |
| Overall Win–Loss | 1–1 | 6–11 | 0 / 12 | 7–12 | 37% |
| Year-end ranking | 141 | | $1,579,680 | | |

=== Doubles ===
Current through the 2026 US Open.

| Tournament | 2026 | SR | W–L | Win% |
|---|---|---|---|---|
Grand Slam tournaments
| Australian Open | A | 0 / 0 | 0–0 | – |
| French Open | A | 0 / 0 | 0–0 | – |
| Wimbledon | A | 0 / 0 | 0–0 | – |
| US Open | 1R | 0 / 1 | 0–1 | 0% |
| Win–Loss | 0–1 | 0 / 1 | 0–1 | 0% |

== WTA Tour finals ==
=== Singles: 1 (runner-up) ===
| Legend WTA 250 (0–1) | Finals by surface Hard (0–1) | Finals by setting Outdoor (0–1) |

| Result | Date | Tournament | Tier | Surface | Opponent | Score |
|---|---|---|---|---|---|---|
| Loss | Jul 2026 | Memphis Classic, United States | WTA 250 | Hard | Kristina Liutova | 6–1, 1–6, 3–6 |

== WTA 125 finals ==
=== Singles: 2 (1 title, 1 runner-up) ===
| Result | W–L | Date | Tournament | Surface | Opponents | Score |
|---|---|---|---|---|---|---|
| Loss | 0–1 | Feb 2026 | Oeiras Indoors, Portugal | Hard (i) | Alina Korneeva | 5–7, 1–6 |
| Win | 1–1 | Jun 2026 | Figueira da Foz Open, Portugal | Hard | (Turkey) Ayla Aksu | 6–2, 6–3 |

== ITF Circuit finals ==
=== Singles: 11 (7 titles, 4 runner-ups) ===
| Legend W100 tournaments (1–1) W75 tournaments (1–0) W35 tournaments (3–0) W15 tournaments (2–3) | Finals by surface Hard (3–2) Clay (4–2) |

| Result | W–L | Date | Tournament | Tier | Surface | Opponent | Score |
|---|---|---|---|---|---|---|---|
| Loss | 0–1 | Nov 2020 | ITF Heraklion, Greece | W15 | Clay | (Romania) Andreea Roșca | 1–6, 2–6 |
| Loss | 0–2 | May 2021 | ITF Šibenik, Croatia | W15 | Clay | (Bosnia and Herzegovina) Dea Herdželaš | 2–6, 6–3, 4–6 |
| Loss | 0–3 | Jun 2024 | ITF Santo Domingo, DR | W15 | Hard | (Germany) Antonia Schmidt | 6–4, 2–6, 5–7 |
| Win | 1–3 | Jul 2024 | ITF Kuršumlijska Banja, Serbia | W15 | Clay | (Latvia) Kamilla Bartone | 6–1, 7–6^{(7–5)} |
| Win | 2–3 | Jul 2024 | ITF Kuršumlijska Banja, Serbia | W15 | Clay | Kristiana Sidorova | 6–2, 7–5 |
| Win | 3–3 | Sep 2024 | ITF Punta Cana, DR | W35 | Clay | (Germany) Alexandra Vecic | 3–6, 6–0, 6–4 |
| Win | 4–3 | Nov 2024 | ITF Miami, United States | W35 | Clay | (Japan) Mayu Crossley | 4–6, 6–4, 6–1 |
| Win | 5–3 | May 2025 | ITF Santo Domingo, DR | W35 | Clay | (Mexico) Ana Sofía Sánchez | 6–1, 6–1 |
| Win | 6–3 | Jun 2025 | Palmetto Pro Open, US | W75 | Hard | (Canada) Cadence Brace | 7–5, 6–1 |
| Win | 7–3 | Jun 2025 | Cary Tennis Classic, US | W100 | Hard | (United States) Monika Ekstrand | 6–3, 6–1 |
| Loss | 7–4 | Jul 2025 | Evansville Classic, US | W100 | Hard | (United States) Caty McNally | 5–7, 4–6 |

=== Doubles: 6 (5 titles, 1 runner-up) ===
| Legend W100 tournaments (1–0) W75 tournaments (1–0) W15 tournaments (3–1) | Finals by surface Hard (1–0) Clay (4–1) |

| Result | W–L | Date | Tournament | Tier | Surface | Partner | Opponents | Score |
|---|---|---|---|---|---|---|---|---|
| Loss | 0–1 | Mar 2021 | ITF Antalya, Turkey | W15 | Clay | (Czech Republic) Anastasia Dețiuc | (Germany) Sina Herrmann (South Korea) Jang Su-jeong | w/o |
| Win | 1–1 | Aug 2021 | ITF Vejle, Denmark | W15 | Clay | (Israel) Nicole Khirin | (Ukraine) Viktoriia Dema (Japan) Eri Shimizu | 7–6^{(9–7)}, 5–7, [10–8] |
| Win | 2–1 | Jul 2024 | ITF Kuršumlijska Banja, Serbia | W15 | Clay | (Latvia) Kamilla Bartone | (Greece) Dimitra Pavlou (Serbia) Anja Stanković | 6–4, 6–2 |
| Win | 3–1 | Jul 2024 | ITF Kuršumlijska Banja, Serbia | W15 | Clay | (Latvia) Kamilla Bartone | (Netherlands) Madelief Hageman (Serbia) Draginja Vuković | 6–3, 6–3 |
| Win | 4–1 | Jul 2025 | Championnats de Granby, Canada | W75 | Hard | (Canada) Alexandra Vagramov | (Japan) Saki Imamura (Japan) Wakana Sonobe | 7–6^{(7–5)}, 6–3 |
| Win | 5–1 | Apr 2026 | Bonita Springs Championship, US | W100 | Clay | (Ecuador) Mell Reasco | (Bulgaria) Lia Karatancheva (United States) Anna Rogers | 7–5, 6–3 |
