= 2026 Memphis Classic – Singles =

Singles
- 2026 Memphis Classic

Final
- Champion: Kristina Liutova
- Runner-up: (Czech Republic) Darja Vidmanova
- Score: 1–6, 6–1, 6–3
- Date: 2nd August 2026

Details
- Draw: 32 (6Q / 4WC)
- Seeds: 8

Events
Singles	Doubles
- Memphis Classic

Kristina Liutova defeated Darja Vidmanova in the final, 1–6, 6–1, 6–3 to win the inaugural singles tennis title at the 2026 Memphis Classic. It was her first WTA Tour title. Aged 16 years and 181 days old, Liutova became the first player born in the 2010s to win a WTA Tour singles title, the youngest player to win a tour-level singles title since Coco Gauff in 2019, and the first to win a tour-level singles title on their main draw debut since Maria Timofeeva in 2023.

== Seeds ==
1. Ekaterina Alexandrova (first round, retired)
2. (United States) McCartney Kessler (first round)
3. (Switzerland) Viktorija Golubic (first round)
4. (Turkey) Zeynep Sönmez (second round)
5. (Colombia) Camila Osorio (second round)
6. (United States) Caty McNally (quarterfinals)
7. (United States) Peyton Stearns (quarterfinals)
8. (Ukraine) Yuliia Starodubtseva (first round)

== Draw ==
Key

- Q = Qualifier
- WC = Wild card
- LL = Lucky loser
- Alt = Alternate
- ITF = ITF entry
- PR = Protected ranking
- SR = Special ranking
- SE = Special exempt
- JE = Junior exempt
- JR = Junior Accelerator Programme entrant
- CO = College Accelerator Programme entrant
- NG = Next Gen Accelerator Program entrant
- w/o = Walkover
- r = Retired
- d = Defaulted

=== Finals ===
Semifinals
Q	Kristina Liutova	7	6
(United States) Elvina Kalieva	5	1
(Czech Republic) Darja Vidmanova	6	6
(Mexico) Renata Zarazúa	3	3

Final
Q	Kristina Liutova	1	6	6
(Czech Republic) Darja Vidmanova	6	1	3

=== Top half ===
First round
1	E Alexandrova	6^{2}	6	4^{r}
Q	K Liutova	7^{7}	4	5
(Australia) M Joint	6	6
WC	(United States) W Osuigwe	4	1
Q	(China) Y Ma	7^{7}	6
(Australia) K Birrell	6^{2}	4
(China) Xiy Wang	6	3	6^{5}
6	(United States) C McNally	4	6	7^{7}
4	(Turkey) Z Sönmez	6	3	6
WC	(Canada) C Brace	4	6	3
Q	(Canada) K Sebov	1	6^{3}
(United States) E Kalieva	6	7^{7}
(Argentina) S Sierra	1	7	2
Q	T Prozorova	6	5	6
(United States) M Stoiana	7^{7}	0	4
7	(United States) P Stearns	6^{5}	6	6

Second round
Q	K Liutova	3	6	6
(Australia) M Joint	6	3	3
Q	(China) Y Ma	2	3
6	(United States) C McNally	6	6
4	(Turkey) Z Sönmez	6	5	5
(United States) E Kalieva	3	7	7
Q	T Prozorova	1	2
7	(United States) P Stearns	6	6

Quarterfinals
Q	K Liutova	6	6
6	(United States) C McNally	3	4
(United States) E Kalieva	6	2	6
7	(United States) P Stearns	1	6	3

Semifinals
Q	K Liutova	7	6
(United States) E Kalieva	5	1

=== Bottom half ===
First round
8	(Ukraine) Y Starodubtseva	4	7	2
WC	(United States) S Stephens	6	5	6
(Czech Republic) D Vidmanova	6	3	6
(Spain) M Bassols Ribera	2	6	4
Q	I Shymanovich	6	6
WC	(United States) R Brantmeier	4	3
(United States) K Volynets	7	2	7^{7}
3	(Switzerland) V Golubic	5	6	6^{3}
5	(Colombia) C Osorio	7	7
Q	(Australia) S Hunter	5	5
A Zakharova	7^{8}	6
(Czech Republic) L Fruhvirtová	6^{6}	1
(Australia) T Gibson	0	3
(Germany) T Maria	6	6
(Mexico) R Zarazúa	6	6
2	(United States) M Kessler	4	1

Second round
WC	(United States) S Stephens	2	4
(Czech Republic) D Vidmanova	6	6
Q	I Shymanovich	4	2
(United States) K Volynets	6	6
5	(Colombia) C Osorio	4	3
A Zakharova	6	6
(Germany) T Maria	4	4
(Mexico) R Zarazúa	6	6

Quarterfinals
(Czech Republic) D Vidmanova	6	6^{5}	6
(United States) K Volynets	4	7^{7}	1
A Zakharova	4	0
(Mexico) R Zarazúa	6	6

Semifinals
(Czech Republic) D Vidmanova	6	6
(Mexico) R Zarazúa	3	3

== Qualifying ==
=== Seeds ===
The top five seeds received a bye into the qualifying competition.

1. Tatiana Prozorova (qualified)
2. (Australia) Storm Hunter (qualified)
3. (China) Ma Yexin (qualified)
4. Iryna Shymanovich (qualified)
5. Kristina Liutova (qualified)
6. (Canada) Katherine Sebov (qualified)
7. (Japan) Aoi Ito (qualifying competition)
8. (Spain) Aran Teixidó García (qualifying competition)
9. (United Kingdom) Sofia Johnson (qualifying competition)
10. Ekaterina Ovcharenko (first round)
11. (United States) Bella Payne (first round)
12. Maria Kozyreva (qualifying competition)

=== Qualifiers ===
1. Tatiana Prozorova
2. (Australia) Storm Hunter
3. (China) Ma Yexin
4. Iryna Shymanovich
5. Kristina Liutova
6. (Canada) Katherine Sebov

=== Qualifying draw ===
==== First qualifier ====
First round				Qualifying competition
				1	Tatiana Prozorova	4	6	6
				WC	(United States) Kennedy Drenser-Hagmann	6	3	1
WC	(United States) Kennedy Drenser-Hagmann	6	6	WC	(United States) Kennedy Drenser-Hagmann	6	3	1
11	(United States) Bella Payne	2	1

==== Second qualifier ====
First round				Qualifying competition
				2	(Australia) Storm Hunter	5	6	6
				9	(United Kingdom) Sofia Johnson	7	1	3
PR	(India) Karman Thandi	1	2	9	(United Kingdom) Sofia Johnson	7	1	3
9	(United Kingdom) Sofia Johnson	6	6

==== Third qualifier ====
First round					Qualifying competition
					3	(China) Ma Yexin	7^{7}	2	6
					7	(Japan) Aoi Ito	6^{3}	6	0
PR	(Australia) Astra Sharma	3	6	5	7	(Japan) Aoi Ito	6^{3}	6	0
7	(Japan) Aoi Ito	6	3	7

==== Fourth qualifier ====
First round				Qualifying competition
				4	Iryna Shymanovich	6	6
					(India) Ankita Raina	2	0
	(India) Ankita Raina	6	6		(India) Ankita Raina	2	0
10	Ekaterina Ovcharenko	2	2

==== Fifth qualifier ====
First round				Qualifying competition
				5	Kristina Liutova	6	2	7^{7}
				12	Maria Kozyreva	3	6	6^{4}
	(Japan) Eri Hozumi	2	4	12	Maria Kozyreva	3	6	6^{4}
12	Maria Kozyreva	6	6

==== Sixth qualifier ====
First round
6	(Canada) Katherine Sebov	6	6
WC	(Peru) Camila Soares	1	0
WC	(United States) Anna Frey	4	4
8	(Spain) Aran Teixidó García	6	6

Qualifying competition
6	(Canada) Katherine Sebov	6	7
8	(Spain) Aran Teixidó García	1	5
