= Stephanie Rehe =

American tennis player

- Country (sports): United States
- Residence: Oceanside, California, U.S.
- Born: November 5, 1969 (age 56) Fontana, California, U.S.
- Height: 1.80 m (5 ft 11 in)
- Turned pro: August 1985
- Retired: 1993
- Plays: Right-handed (two-handed backhand)
- Prize money: $579,168

Singles
- Career record: 151–99
- Career titles: 5
- Highest ranking: No. 10 (March 13, 1989)

Grand Slam singles results
- Australian Open: 2R (1992, 1993)
- French Open: 4R (1987)
- Wimbledon: 3R (1985, 1988)
- US Open: 4R (1986, 1988)

Doubles
- Career record: 71–59
- Career titles: 2
- Highest ranking: No. 10 (October 5, 1992)

Stephanie Rehe (born November 5, 1969) is an American former tennis player.

She played on the WTA Tour between 1985 and 1993, won five singles and two doubles titles, and reached a career-high singles ranking of No. 10, in March 1989.

== Career ==
A successful amateur player, Rehe was ranked No. 1 in every age group as a junior (12s, 14s, 16s, 18s). She was the first player to receive a dual No. 1 ranking in 14s and 16s (1983).

At the age of 13 years and one month, Rehe was in 1982 the youngest player to compete in a WTA Tour event. In 1983, she became the youngest player to be ranked on the WTA computer, coming on at 13 years and two months in January, two months younger than Steffi Graf. She won her first tournament in 1985 in the Virginia Slims of Utah not dropping a set along the way; as well as upsetting Camille Benjamin in the final. She defeated Michelle Torres, Carling Bassett, and Gabriela Sabatini to capture her first major Virginia Slims Series event at the Florida Federal Open in Tampa in November 1985. Rehe defeated Lisa Bonder, and pushed Steffi Graf to three sets in the quarterfinals at Fort Lauderdale in 1985. In 1986, she received the Most Impressive Newcomer Award of the WTA and was voted Rookie of the Year by Tennis Magazine.

She reached a career-high ranking of world No. 10 on March 13, 1989. However, she left the tour that year due to a back injury, which required surgery and extensive rehabilitation. She returned to the tour in August 1990 in San Diego and was WTA awarded Comeback Player of the Year in 1991. She retired permanently in 1993.

She won five singles titles and two doubles titles, and had career wins over Pam Shriver, Gabriela Sabatini, Claudia Kohde-Kilsch, Zina Garrison, Mary Joe Fernandez, and Jo Durie. Her best singles performances in Grand Slam events included fourth rounds at the US Open in 1986 and 1988, and at the French Open in 1987.

== WTA Tour finals ==
=== Singles: 7 (5 titles, 2 runner-ups) ===
Legend Tier III (0–0) Tier IV (0–0) Tier V (2–1) Virginia Slims (3–1)	Finals by surface Hard (4–2) Grass (0–0) Clay (0–0) Carpet (1–0)

Result	W/L	Date	Tournament	Tier	Surface	Opponent	Score
Win	1–0	Sep 1985	Salt Lake City, US	VS	Hard	(United States) Camille Benjamin	6–2, 6–4
Win	2–0	Nov 1985	Tampa, US	VS	Hard	(Argentina) Gabriela Sabatini	6–4, 6–7^{(4–7)}, 7–5
Loss	2–1	Aug 1986	San Diego, US	VS	Hard	(United States) Melissa Gurney	2–6, 4–6
Win	3–1	Oct 1987	Puerto Rico, US	VS	Hard	(United States) Camille Benjamin	7–5, 7–6^{(7–4)}
Loss	3–2	Apr 1988	Tokyo, Japan	Tier V	Hard	(United States) Patty Fendick	3–6, 5–7
Win	4–2	Apr 1988	Taipei, Taiwan	Tier V	Carpet (i)	(Netherlands) Brenda Schultz	6–4, 6–4
Win	5–2	Aug 1988	San Diego, US	Tier V	Hard	(United States) Ann Grossman	6–1, 6–1

=== Doubles: 4 (2 titles, 2 runner-ups) ===
Legend Tier II (1–0) Tier III (0–0) Tier IV (1–2) Tier V (0–0)	Finals by surface Hard (1–1) Grass (0–0) Clay (1–0) Carpet (0–1)

Result	W/L	Date	Tournament	Tier	Surface	Partner	Opponents	Score
Win	1–0	May 1991	Strasbourg, France	Tier IV	Clay	(United States) Lori McNeil	(Netherlands) Manon Bollegraf (Argentina) Mercedes Paz	6–7^{(2–7)}, 6–4, 6–4
Win	2–0	Mar 1992	Indian Wells, US	Tier II	Hard	(Germany) Claudia Kohde-Kilsch	(Canada) Jill Hetherington (United States) Kathy Rinaldi	6–3, 6–3
Loss	2–1	Apr 1992	Tokyo, Japan	Tier IV	Hard	(Japan) Kimiko Date	(United States) Amy Frazier (Japan) Rika Hiraki	7–5, 6–7^{(5–7)}, 0–6
Loss	2–2	Oct 1992	Bayonne, France	Tier IV	Carpet (i)	(Germany) Claudia Kohde-Kilsch	(Italy) Linda Ferrando (Czechoslovakia) Petra Langrová	6–1, 3–6, 4–6

== Grand Slam performance timeline ==
Key
W	F	SF	QF	#R	RR	Q#	DNQ	A	NH

(W) winner; (F) finalist; (SF) semifinalist; (QF) quarterfinalist; (#R) rounds 4, 3, 2, 1; (RR) round-robin stage; (Q#) qualification round; (DNQ) did not qualify; (A) absent; (NH) not held; (SR) strike rate (events won / competed); (W–L) win–loss record.

=== Singles ===
Tournament	1984	1985	1986	1987	1988	1989	1990	1991	1992	1993	W–L
Australian Open	A	A	NH	A	A	A	A	A	2R	2R	2–2
French Open	1R	A	A	4R	1R	A	A	2R	A	A	4–4
Wimbledon	A	3R	1R	A	3R	A	A	1R	A	A	4–4
US Open	1R	1R	4R	A	4R	A	A	A	2R	A	7–5
Win–loss	0–2	2–2	3–2	3–1	5–3	0–0	0–0	1–2	2–2	1–1	17–15
Year-end ranking	NR	18	19	28	14	NR	58	125	75	NR	
