= WTA 250 tournaments =

Tournament category in women's tennis

WTA 250 is a category of tennis tournaments in the Women's Tennis Association tour, implemented since the reorganization of the schedule in 2021. Earlier these events were classified as WTA International Tournaments.

The ranking points awarded to the winners of these tournaments are 250. This compares to 2,000 points for winning a Grand Slam tournament ("Major"), up to 1,500 points for winning the WTA Finals, 1000 points for winning a WTA 1000 tournament, and 500 for winning a WTA 500 tournament.

At their introduction in 2021, WTA 250 tournaments' prize money was approximately $250,000. As of 2026 season, this has risen to $283,347. All tournaments have a 32 player main draw for singles and a 16 team main draw for doubles.

== Historic names ==
- 1990–2008: WTA Tier III / IV / V
- 2009–2020: WTA International
- 2021–present: WTA 250

== WTA points ==
Event	W	F	SF	QF	R16	R32	Q	Q2	Q1
Singles	250	163	98	54	30	1	18	12	1
Doubles	250	163	98	54	1	—N/a	—N/a	—N/a	—N/a

== Events ==
=== Current ===
Tournament	Location	Venue	Surface	Draw	Prize money	Date
Auckland Open	Auckland	ASB Tennis Centre	Hard	32S	$283,347	5 January–11 January
Hobart International	Hobart	Hobart International Tennis Centre	Hard	32S	$283,347	12–17 January
Ostrava Open	Ostrava	Ostravar Aréna	Hard (i)	30S	$283,347	1 February – 7 February
Transylvania Open	Cluj-Napoca	BTarena	Hard (i)	32S	$283,347	1 February – 7 February
ATX Open	Austin	Westwood Country Club	Hard	32S	$283,347	23 February–1 March
Copa Colsanitas	Bogotá	Country Club de Bogotá	Clay	32S	$283,347	30 March–5 April
Open de Rouen	Rouen	Kindarena	Clay (i)	32S	€246,388	14–20 April
Morocco Open	Rabat	Club des Cheminots	Clay	32S	$283,347	19–24 May
Rosmalen Open	's-Hertogenbosch	Autotron Rosmalen	Grass	32S	€246,388	9–15 June
Nottingham Open	Nottingham	Nottingham Tennis Centre	Grass	32S	$283,347	16–22 June
Eastbourne Open	Eastbourne	Devonshire Park Lawn Tennis Club	Grass	32S	$499,000	23–28 June
Athens Open (WTA)	Athens	Stadion Sports Center	Hard	32S	€246,388	13–19 July
Iași Open	Iași	Baza Sportiva Circ	Clay	32S	€246,388	13–19 July
Hamburg Open	Hamburg	Am Rothenbaum	Clay	32S	€246,388	20–26 July
Prague Open	Prague	TK Sparta Prague	Hard	32S	$283,347	20–26 July
Memphis Classic	Memphis	Leftwich Tennis Center	Hard	32S	$283,347	27 July–2 Aug
SP Open	São Paulo	Parque Villa-Lobos	Hard	32S	$283,347	14–20 September
Korea Open	Seoul	Seoul Olympic Park Tennis Center	Hard	32S	$283,347	21–27 September
Japan Open	Osaka	Utsubo Tennis Center	Hard	32S	$283,347	13–19 October
Guangzhou Open	Guangzhou	Nansha International Tennis Center	Hard	32S	$283,347	20–26 October
Hong Kong Open	Hong Kong	Victoria Park	Hard	32S	$283,347	27 October–2 November
Chennai Open	Chennai	SDAT Tennis Stadium	Hard	32S	$283,347	27 October–2 November

=== Former ===
Tournament	City	Venue	Surface	Status
Singapore Tennis Open	Singapore	OCBC Arena, Kallang Tennis Centre	Hard (i)	WTA 500
Jiangxi Open (2016–2019, 2023–2025)	Jiujiang	Jiujiang International Tennis Center	Hard	WTA 125
Palermo Open (1988–2024)	Palermo	Country Time Club	Clay	WTA 125
Birmingham Classic (2021–2024)	Birmingham	Edgbaston Priory Club	Grass	WTA 125
Tennis in the Land	Cleveland	Jacobs Pavilion	Hard	Defunct
Thailand Open (2019–2024)	Hua Hin	True Arena Hua Hin	Hard	Defunct
Budapest Grand Prix (2021–2024)	Budapest	Római Teniszakadémia	Clay	Defunct
Jasmin Open (2022–2024)	Monastir	Tennis Club de Monastir	Hard	Defunct
Mérida Open (2023–2024)	Mérida	Yucatan Country Club	Hard	WTA 500
Internationaux de Strasbourg (1987–2023)	Strasbourg	Tennis Club de Strasbourg	Clay	WTA 500
Korea Open (2001–2019, 2022–2023)	Seoul	Seoul Olympic Park Tennis Center	Hard	WTA 500 (Note: Upgraded to WTA 500 in 2024-2025, returned as WTA 250 in 2026)
Monterrey Open (2009–2023)	Monterrey	Club Sonoma	Hard	WTA 500
Linz Open (2009–2023)	Linz	TipsArena Linz	Hard	WTA 500
Bad Homburg Open (2021–2023)	Bad Homburg	TC Bad Homburg	Grass	WTA 500
Ningbo Open (2023)	Ningbo	Ningbo (Yinzhou) Tennis Center	Hard	WTA 500
Lyon Open (2020–2023)	Lyon	Palais des Sports de Gerland	Hard	Defunct
Swiss Open (1968–2023)	Lausanne	Tennis Club Stade-Lausanne	Clay	Defunct
Slovenia Open (2005–2022)	Portorož	Tennis Club Portorož	Hard	Defunct
İstanbul Cup (2005–2022)	Istanbul	TTF Istanbul Tennis Center	Clay	Defunct
Washington Open (2011–2019, 2022)	Washington, D.C.	William H.G. FitzGerald Tennis Center	Hard	WTA 500
Abierto Zapopan (2021–2022)	Guadalajara	Panamerican Tennis Center	Hard	WTA 125
Emilia-Romagna Open (2021–2022)	Parma	Tennis Club Parma	Clay	WTA 125
Melbourne Summer Set 1 (2022)	Melbourne	Melbourne Park	Hard	Defunct
Melbourne Summer Set 2 (2022)	Melbourne	Melbourne Park	Hard	Defunct
Adelaide International (2022)	Adelaide	Memorial Drive Tennis Centre	Hard	WTA 500 (Note: The Adelaide International held two tournaments in 2022 following the cancellation of that year's Hobart International. The tournament is typically a WTA 500 event.)
Tallinn Open (2022)	Tallinn	Tondi Tennis Center	Hard (i)	Defunct
Poland Open (1968–2021)	Warsaw	Legia Tennis Centre	Hard	WTA 125
Luxembourg Open (1996–2021)	Luxembourg City	Kockelscheuer Sport Centre	Hard (i)	Defunct
Charleston Open (2021)	Charleston	Family Circle Tennis Center	Clay	WTA 500 (Note: The Charleston Open held two tournaments in 2021 following general tournament cancellations caused by COVID-19. The tournament is typically a WTA 500 event.)
Serbia Open (2021)	Belgrade	Novak Tennis Center	Clay	Defunct
Chicago Open (2021)	Chicago	XS Tennis Village	Hard	Defunct
Astana Open (2021)	Astana	Daulet National Tennis Centre	Hard (i)	Defunct (Note: While the women's event was abolished, the men's event is still active.)
Tenerife Ladies Open (2021)	Tenerife	Abama Tennis Academy	Hard	Defunct
Courmayeur Ladies Open (2021)	Courmayeur	Courmayeur Sport Center	Hard (i)	Defunct
Mexican Open (2001–2020)	Acapulco	Fairmont Acapulco Princess	Hard	Defunct
Shenzhen Open (2013–2020)	Shenzhen	Shenzhen Longgang Sports Center	Hard	Defunct
Tianjin Open (2014–2019)	Tianjin	Tianjin International Tennis Center	Hard	Defunct

== Singles champions ==
=== WTA International ===
	2009	2010	2011	2012	2013	2014	2015	2016	2017	2018	2019	2020
Brisbane	V. Azarenka (1/5)	K. Clijsters (1/1)	Kvitová (2/5)	WTA Premier								
Auckland	E. Dementieva (1/1)	Wickmayer (3/5)	G. Arn (1/1)	J. Zheng (1/1)	A. Radwańska (1/4)	Ivanovic (4/5)	V. Williams (4/6)	Stephens (2/4)	L. Davis (1/2)	Görges (3/5)	Görges (5/5)	S. Williams (2/2)
Shenzhen	Not an Event				N. Li (2/3)	N. Li (3/3)	Halep (6/10)	A. Radwańska (4/4)	K. Siniaková (1/6)	Halep (8/10)	A. Sabalenka (1/3)	E. Alexandrova (1/4)
Hobart	P. Kvitová (1/5)	A. Bondarenko (1/1)	Gajdošová (2/2)	M. Barthel (1/3)	E. Vesnina (1/1)	G. Muguruza (1/3)	Watson (2/4)	Cornet (4/5)	E. Mertens (1/8)	Mertens (2/8)	S. Kenin (1/4)	Rybakina (2/2)
Pattaya City	V. Zvonareva (1/3)	Zvonareva (2/3)	D. Hantuchová (1/4)	Hantuchová (2/4)	M. Kirilenko (1/1)	E. Makarova (1/2)	Hantuchová (4/4)	Not an Event				
Kaohsiung/ Taipei	Not an Event							V. Williams (6/6)	Svitolina (5/12)	Babos (3/3)	Not an Event	
Hua Hin	Not an Event										Yastremska (2/3)	Linette (2/4)
Memphis	Azarenka (2/5)	M. Sharapova (1/3)	Rybáriková (2/4)	S. Arvidsson (1/1)	M. Erakovic (1/1)	Not an Event						
Rio de Janeiro	Not an Event					K. Nara (1/1)	Errani (6/6)	Schiavone (4/5)	Not an Event			
Acapulco	V. Williams (1/6)	V. Williams (2/6)	G. Dulko (1/1)	S. Errani (1/6)	Errani (5/6)	D. Cibulková (1/3)	Bacsinszky (2/4)	Stephens (3/4)	Tsurenko (3/4)	Tsurenko (4/4)	Y. Wang (1/1)	Watson (4/4)
Kuala Lumpur	Not an Event	A. Kleybanova (1/2)	J. Dokic (1/1)	S-w. Hsieh (1/3)	Ka. Plíšková (1/6)	D. Vekić (1/4)	Wozniacki (8/9)	Svitolina (4/12)	A. Barty (1/3)	Not an Event		
Florianópolis	Not an Event				M. Niculescu (1/3)	K. Zakopalová (1/1)	Pereira (2/2)	Begu (3/6)	Not an Event			
Lyon	Not an Event											Kenin (4/4)
Monterrey	M. Bartoli (1/2)	A. Pavlyuchenkova (1/10)	Pavlyuchenkova (3/10)	T. Babos (1/3)	Pavlyuchenkova (4/10)	Ivanovic (5/5)	Bacsinszky (3/4)	Watson (3/4)	Pavlyuchenkova (7/10)	Muguruza (2/3)	Muguruza (3/3)	Svitolina (7/12)
Ponte Vedra; Beach	C. Wozniacki (1/9)	Wozniacki (2/9)	Not an Event									
Marbella	J. Janković (1/4)	Pennetta (2/2)	Azarenka (3/5)	Not an Event								
Katowice	Not an Event				Vinci (7/8)	Cornet (3/5)	A.K. Schmiedlová (1/3)	Cibulková (2/3)	Not an Event			
Barcelona	R. Vinci (1/8)	F. Schiavone (1/5)	Vinci (3/8)	Errani (2/6)	Not an Event							
Biel/ Lugano	Not an Event								M. Vondroušová (1/1)	Mertens (3/8)	Hercog (3/3)	Not an Event
Estoril	Y. Wickmayer (1/5)	A. Sevastova (1/4)	Medina Garrigues (2/3)	Kanepi (2/2)	Pavlyuchenkova (5/10)	C. Suárez Navarro (1/1)	Not an Event					
Strasbourg	A. Rezaï (1/3)	Sharapova (2/3)	Petkovic (2/5)	Schiavone (2/5)	Cornet (2/5)	M. Puig (1/1)	Stosur (4/6)	Garcia (2/7)	Stosur (6/6)	Pavlyuchenkova (10/10)	Yastremska (3/3)	Svitolina (8/12)
Bogotá	MJ. Martínez Sánchez (1/4)	M. Duque-Mariño (1/1)	L. Domínguez Lino (1/1)	L. Arruabarrena (1/2)	Janković (2/4)	C. Garcia (1/7)	T. Pereira (1/2)	I. Falconi (1/1)	Schiavone (5/5)	Schmiedlová (3/3)	A. Anisimova (1/2)	Cancelled due to the coronavirus pandemic
Fez/ Marrakech/ Rabat	A. Medina Garrigues (1/3)	I. Benešová (1/1)	A. Brianti (1/1)	K. Bertens (1/5)	Schiavone (3/5)	MT. Torró Flor (1/1)	Svitolina (3/12)	Bacsinszky (4/4)	Pavlyuchenkova (8/10)	Mertens (4/8)	M. Sakkari (1/1)	Cancelled due to the coronavirus pandemic
Nottingham	Not an Event						A. Konjuh (1/1)	Ka. Plíšková (5/6)	Vekić (2/4)	Barty (2/3)	Garcia (5/7)	Cancelled due to the coronavirus pandemic
's-Hertogenbosch	T. Tanasugarn (1/2)	J. Henin (1/1)	Vinci (4/8)	Petrova (2/3)	Halep (2/10)	C. Vandeweghe (1/2)	C. Giorgi (1/3)	Vandeweghe (2/2)	A. Kontaveit (1/3)	A. Krunić (1/1)	Riske (2/3)	Cancelled due to the coronavirus pandemic
Birmingham	M. Rybáriková (1/4)	N. Li (1/3)	S. Lisicki (1/3)	M. Oudin (1/1)	Hantuchová (3/4)	WTA Premier						Cancelled due to the coronavirus pandemic
Nürnberg/ Bad Homburg	Not an Event				S. Halep (1/10)	E. Bouchard (1/1)	Knapp (2/2)	Bertens (2/5)	Bertens (3/5)	Larsson (2/2)	Y. Putintseva (1/3)	Cancelled due to the coronavirus pandemic
Bucharest	Not an Event					Halep (5/10)	Schmiedlová (2/3)	Halep (7/10)	Begu (4/6)	Sevastova (3/4)	E. Rybakina (1/2)	Cancelled due to the coronavirus pandemic
Gstaad/ Lausanne	Not an Event							V. Golubic (1/2)	Bertens (4/5)	Cornet (5/5)	F. Ferro (1/2)	Cancelled due to the coronavirus pandemic
Jūrmala	Not an Event										Sevastova (4/4)	Cancelled due to the coronavirus pandemic
Washington, D.C.	Not an Event		N. Petrova (1/3)	Rybáriková (3/4)	Rybáriková (4/4)	S. Kuznetsova (1/2)	S. Stephens (1/4)	Wickmayer (5/5)	Makarova (2/2)	Kuznetsova (2/2)	J. Pegula (1/3)	Cancelled due to the coronavirus pandemic
Mallorca	Not an Event							Garcia (3/7)	Sevastova (2/4)	T. Maria (1/3)	Kenin (2/4)	Not an Event
Budapest	Á. Szávay (1/3)	Szávay (2/3)	Vinci (5/8)	Errani (3/6)	Halep (3/10)	Not an Event			Babos (2/3)	Van Uytvanck (2/5)	Van Uytvanck (3/5)	Not an Event
Båstad	Martínez Sánchez (2/4)	Rezaï (3/3)	P. Hercog (1/3)	Hercog (2/3)	S. Williams (1/2)	Barthel (2/3)	J. Larsson (1/2)	L. Siegemund (1/1)	Siniaková (2/6)	Not an Event		
Prague	S. Bammer (1/1)	Szávay (3/3)	ITF Women's Circuit				Ka. Plíšková (4/6)	Šafářová (2/2)	Barthel (3/3)	Kvitová (5/5)	J. Teichmann (1/2)	Halep (9/10)
Palermo	F. Pennetta (1/2)	K. Kanepi (1/2)	Medina Garrigues (3/3)	Errani (4/6)	Vinci (8/8)	Not an Event					Teichmann (2/2)	Ferro (2/2)
Portorož	D. Safina (1/1)	A. Chakvetadze (1/1)	Not an Event									
Bad Gastein	A. Petkovic (1/5)	J. Görges (1/5)	Martínez Sánchez (3/4)	A. Cornet (1/5)	Y. Meusburger (1/1)	Petkovic (3/5)	Stosur (5/6)	Not an Event				
Baku	Not held		Zvonareva (3/3)	B. Jovanovski (1/2)	E. Svitolina (1/12)	Svitolina (2/12)	M. Gasparyan (1/2)	Not an Event				
İstanbul	V. Dushevina (1/1)	Pavlyuchenkova (2/10)	Not held			Wozniacki (7/9)	L. Tsurenko (1/4)	Ç Büyükakçay (1/1)	Svitolina (6/12)	P. Parmentier (1/2)	P. Martić (1/2)	PM. Țig (1/1)
Moscow River	Not an Event									O. Danilović (1/2)	Not an Event	
Dallas	Not an Event		Lisicki (2/3)	Vinci (6/8)	Not an Event							
The Bronx	Not an Event										M. Linette (1/4)	Not an Event
Lexington	Not an Event											J. Brady (1/1)
Copenhagen	Not an Event	Wozniacki (3/9)	Wozniacki (4/9)	A. Kerber (1/4)	Not an Event							
Québec City	M. Czink (1/1)	T. Paszek (1/1)	B. Záhlavová-Strýcová (1/2)	K. Flipkens (1/1)	L. Šafářová (1/2)	M. Lučić-Baroni (1/1)	Beck (2/2)	O. Dodin (1/1)	A. Van Uytvanck (1/5)	Parmentier (2/2)	Not an Event	
Tashkent	Pe'er (2/2)	A. Kudryavtseva (1/1)	K. Pervak (1/1)	IC. Begu (1/6)	Jovanovski (2/2)	K. Knapp (1/2)	N. Hibino (1/3)	Kr. Plíšková (1/1)	K. Bondarenko (1/1)	Gasparyan (2/2)	Van Uytvanck (4/5)	Not an Event
Linz	Wickmayer (2/5)	A. Ivanovic (1/5)	Kvitová (3/5)	Azarenka (5/5)	Kerber (2/4)	Ka. Plíšková (3/6)	Pavlyuchenkova (6/10)	Cibulková (3/3)	Strýcová (2/2)	Giorgi (2/3)	C. Gauff (1/4)	Sabalenka (3/3)
Osaka/ Tokyo/ Hiroshima	S. Stosur (1/6)	Tanasugarn (2/2)	Bartoli (2/2)	H. Watson (1/4)	Stosur (2/6)	Stosur (3/6)	Wickmayer (4/5)	C. McHale (1/1)	Z. Diyas (1/1)	Hsieh (3/3)	Hibino (2/3)	Cancelled due to the coronavirus pandemic
Nanchang	Not an Event							Y. Duan (1/1)	Peng (2/2)	Q. Wang (1/2)	R. Peterson (1/2)	Cancelled due to the coronavirus pandemic
Seoul	K. Date-Krumm (1/1)	Kleybanova (2/2)	Martínez Sánchez (4/4)	Wozniacki (5/9)	A. Radwańska (2/4)	Ka. Plíšková (2/6)	Begu (2/6)	Arruabarrena (2/2)	J. Ostapenko (1/3)	Bertens (5/5)	K. Muchová (1/1)	Cancelled due to the coronavirus pandemic
Guangzhou	S. Pe'er (1/2)	J. Gajdošová (1/2)	C. Scheepers (1/1)	Hsieh (2/3)	S. Zhang (1/3)	Niculescu (2/3)	Janković (3/4)	Tsurenko (2/4)	Zhang (2/3)	Q. Wang (2/2)	Kenin (3/4)	Cancelled due to the coronavirus pandemic
Tianjin	Not an Event					A. Riske (1/3)	A. Radwańska (3/4)	S. Peng (1/2)	Sharapova (3/3)	Garcia (4/7)	Peterson (2/2)	Cancelled due to the coronavirus pandemic
Hong Kong	Not an Event					Lisicki (3/3)	Janković (4/4)	Wozniacki (9/9)	Pavlyuchenkova (9/10)	D. Yastremska (1/3)	Cancelled due to Hong Kong protests	Cancelled due to the coronavirus pandemic
Luxembourg	T. Bacsinszky (1/4)	Vinci (2/8)	Azarenka (4/5)	V. Williams (3/6)	Wozniacki (6/9)	A. Beck (1/2)	M. Doi (1/1)	Niculescu (3/3)	C. Witthöft (1/1)	Görges (4/5)	Ostapenko (2/3)	Cancelled due to the coronavirus pandemic
Bali/ Sofia/ Zhuhai	Rezaï (2/3)	Ivanovic (2/5)	Ivanovic (3/5)	Petrova (3/3)	Halep (4/10)	Petkovic (4/5)	V. Williams (5/6)	Kvitová (4/5)	Görges (2/5)	Barty (3/3)	Sabalenka (2/3)	Cancelled due to the coronavirus pandemic

=== WTA 250 ===
	2021	2022	2023	2024	2025	2026
Auckland	Cancelled due to COVID-19	Cancelled due to COVID-19	Gauff (3/4)	Gauff (4/4)	Tauson (3/3)	Svitolina (12/12)
Shenzhen	Cancelled due to COVID-19	Suspended due to Peng Shuai allegation	Suspended	Not an event		
Melbourne 1	WTA 500	S. Halep (10/10)	Not an event			
Melbourne 2	WTA 500	A. Anisimova (2/2)	Not an event			
Hobart	Cancelled		L. Davis (2/2)	E. Navarro (1/1)	Kessler (2/3)	Cocciaretto (2/2)
Adelaide 2	Not an event	M. Keys (1/2)	WTA 500	Not an event		
Melbourne 4	D. Kasatkina (1/2)	Not an event				
Singapore	Not an event				Mertens (7/8)	WTA 500
Hua Hin	Cancelled	Cancelled	L. Zhu (1/1)	D. Shnaider (1/3) (Note: Competed under no flag due to the Russian invasion of Ukraine.); R. Šramková (1/1)	Not an event	
Acapulco	Cancelled	Not an event				
Cluj-Napoca 2	Kontaveit (3/3)	A. Blinkova (1/2)	T. Korpatsch (1/2)	Ka. Plíšková (6/6)	Potapova (3/3)	Cîrstea (3/3)
Ostrava	WTA 500		Not an event			Boulter (3/3)
Austin	Not an event		M. Kostyuk (1/2)	Y. Yuan (1/1)	Pegula (3/3)	Stearns (2/2)
Lyon	C. Tauson (1/3)	S. Zhang (3/3)	A. Parks (1/1)	Not an event		
Guadalajara	S. Sorribes Tormo (1/2)	S. Stephens (4/5)	Not an event	WTA 125		Not an event
Bogotá	C. Osorio (1/3)	T. Maria (2/3)	Maria (3/3)	Osorio (2/3)	Osorio (3/3)	Bouzková (3/4)
Rouen	Not an event	WTA 125		Stephens (5/5)	Svitolina (11/12)	Kostyuk (2/2)
Rabat	Cancelled	M. Trevisan (1/1)	L. Bronzetti (1/1)	P. Stearns (1/2)	M. Joint (1/2)	P. Marčinko (1/1)
Cologne	Cancelled	Not an event				
Nottingham	J. Konta (1/1)	B. Haddad Maia (1/2)	K. Boulter (1/3)	Boulter (2/3)	Kessler (3/3)	Bouzková (4/4)
's-Hertogenbosch	Cancelled	E. Alexandrova (2/4)	Alexandrova (4/4)	Samsonova (3/3)	Mertens (8/8)	R. Montgomery (1/1)
Birmingham	O. Jabeur (1/2)	Haddad Maia (2/2)	J. Ostapenko (3/3)	Putintseva (3/3)	WTA 125	
Eastbourne	WTA 500				Joint (2/2)	Keys (2/2)
Budapest	Y. Putintseva (2/3)	B. Pera (1/2)	M. Timofeeva (1/1)	Shnaider (2/3)	Not an event	
Palermo	D. Collins (1/1)	IC. Begu (5/6)	Q. Zheng (1/2)	Q. Zheng (2/2)	WTA 125	
Iași	Not an event	WTA 125		M. Andreeva (1/1)	Begu (6/6)	Sherif (2/2)
Athens	Not an event					Krejčíková (4/4)
Prague	Krejčíková (2/4)	M. Bouzková (1/4)	N. Hibino (3/3)	M. Linette (3/4)	Bouzková (2/4)	L. Tagger (1/1)
Memphis	Not an event					K. Liutova (1/1)
Cleveland	A. Kontaveit (2/3)	Samsonova (2/3)	Sorribes Tormo (2/2)	M. Kessler (1/3)	Cîrstea (2/3)	Not an event
Monastir	Not an event	E. Mertens (5/8)	Mertens (6/8)	S. Kartal (1/1)	Not an event	
Ningbo	Not an event		Jabeur (2/2)	WTA 500		
Granby	Cancelled	Kasatkina (2/2)	Not an event			
Sao Paulo	Not an event				T. Rakotomanga Rajaonah (1/1)	K. Quevedo (1/1)
Osaka	Cancelled		A. Krueger (1/1)	S. Lamens (1/1)	Fernandez (4/4)	Siniaková (6/6)
Guangzhou	Cancelled	Suspended	X. Wang (1/1)	O. Danilović (2/2)	Li (2/2)	H. Dart (1/1)
Hong Kong	Cancelled	Suspended	Fernandez (3/4)	Shnaider (3/3)	V. Mboko (1/1)	C. Liu (1/1)
Mérida	Not an event		C. Giorgi (3/3)	Z. Sönmez (1/1)	WTA 500	
Tianjin	Cancelled	Suspended	Not an event			
Nanchang; Jiujiang	Cancelled	Suspended	Siniaková (5/6)	V. Golubic (2/2)	Blinkova (2/2)	WTA 125
Monterrey	L. Fernandez (1/4)	Fernandez (2/4)	Vekić (4/4)	WTA 500		
Anning	Cancelled	Suspended	Not an event			
Charleston 2	A. Sharma (1/1)	Not an event				
İstanbul	S. Cîrstea (1/3)	A. Potapova (1/3)	Cancelled due to earthquake	Not an event		
Belgrade	P. Badosa (1/1)	Not an event				
Strasbourg	B. Krejcikova (1/4)	Kerber (4/4)	Svitolina (10/12)	WTA 500		
Bad Homburg	A. Kerber (3/4)	C. Garcia (6/7)	Siniaková (4/6)	WTA 500		
Lausanne	T. Zidanšek (1/1)	P. Martić (2/2)	E. Cocciaretto (1/2)	Not an event		
Hamburg	EG. Ruse (1/1)	Pera (2/2)	A. Rus (1/1)	WTA 125	L. Boisson (1/1)	Korpatsch (2/2)
Gdynia/Warsaw	M. Zanevska (1/1)	Garcia (7/7)	I. Świątek (1/1)	WTA 125		
Washington, D.C.	Exhibition	L. Samsonova (1/3)	WTA 500			
Cluj-Napoca	A. Petkovic (5/5)	Not an event				
Chicago	E. Svitolina (9/12)	Not an event				
Luxembourg	Tauson (2/3)	Not an event				
Portorož	J. Paolini (1/1)	K. Siniaková (3/6)	Not an event			
Chennai	Not an event	L. Fruhvirtová (1/1)	Not an event		J. Tjen (1/1)	Linette (4/4)
Seoul	WTA 125	Alexandrova (3/4)	J. Pegula (2/3)	WTA 500		K. Birrell (1/1)
Astana	A. Van Uytvanck (5/5)	Not an event				
Parma	C. Gauff (2/4)	M. Sherif (1/2)	WTA 125			
Tallinn	Not an event	Krejčíková (3/4)	Not an event			
Linz	A. Riske (3/3)	Not an event	Potapova (2/3)	WTA 500		
Tenerife	A. Li (1/2)	Not an event				
Courmayeur	D. Vekić (3/4)	Not an event				WTA 125

== Statistics ==
=== Most titles ===
Bold face designates active players

Titles	Player
17	Steffi Graf
16	Conchita Martínez
13	Lindsay Davenport
12	Elina Svitolina
11	Anabel Medina Garrigues
11	Venus Williams
11	Caroline Wozniacki
10	Simona Halep
10	/ Manuela Maleeva
10	Anastasia Pavlyuchenkova
10	/ Monica Seles
10	Vera Zvonareva

== See also ==
- WTA Tour
- WTA 1000 tournaments
- WTA 500 tournaments
- WTA 125 tournaments
- ITF Women's World Tennis Tour
- WTA International tournaments
- ATP Tour 250
