= Virginia Slims of Utah =

Defunct tennis tournament
- Event name: Women's Games (1980); Virginia Slims of Utah (1983–1985)
- Tour: WTA Tour
- Founded: 1980
- Abolished: 1985
- Editions: 4
- Location: Salt Lake City, United States
- Surface: Hard

The Virginia Slims of Utah is a defunct women's tennis tournament first held in 1980 and played a further three times from 1983 to 1985. It was held in Salt Lake City in the United States and played on outdoor hard courts.

== Past finals ==
=== Singles ===
Year	Champions	Runners-up	Score
1980	(Romania) Virginia Ruzici	(Argentina) Ivanna Madruga-Osses	6–1, 6–3
1981–1982	Not Held		
1983	(South Africa) Yvonne Vermaak	(United States) Felicia Raschiatore	6–2, 0–6, 7–5
1984	(South Africa) Yvonne Vermaak	(United States) Terry Holladay	6–1, 6–2
1985	(United States) Stephanie Rehe	(United States) Camille Benjamin	6–2, 6–4

=== Doubles ===
Year	Champions	Runners-up	Score
1980	(Romania) Virginia Ruzici (United States) Pam Teeguarden	(United States) Barbara Jordan (United States) JoAnne Russell	6–4, 7–5
1981–1982	Not Held		
1983	(Brazil) Cláudia Monteiro (South Africa) Yvonne Vermaak	(United States) Amanda Brown (Australia) Brenda Remilton	6–1, 3–6, 6–4
1984	(Australia) Anne Minter (Australia) Elizabeth Minter	(United States) Heather Crowe (United States) Robin White	6–1, 6–2
1985	(Soviet Union) Svetlana Cherneva (Soviet Union) Larisa Neiland	(South Africa) Rosalyn Fairbank (South Africa) Beverly Mould	7–5, 6–2
