= 2026 Adana Open =

- Date: 28 September–4 October
- Edition: 1st
- Category: WTA 125
- Draw: 32S / 16D
- Prize money: $115,000
- Surface: Hard
- Location: Adana, Turkey
- Venue: Adana Tenis Dağ ve Su Sporları Kulübü - ATDSK

Champions

Singles
- (France) Léolia Jeanjean

Doubles
- (Italy) Angelica Moratelli / (Czech Republic) Vendula Valdmannová
- Adana Open

The 2026 Adana Open was a professional women's tennis tournament played on outdoor hardcourts. It was the 1st edition of this WTA 125 tournament, which was part of the 2026 WTA 125 Circuit. It took place at the Adana Tennis, Mountain and Water Sports Club in Adana, Turkey, from 28 September through 4 October 2026.

== Singles main draw entrants ==
=== Seeds ===
Country	Player	Rank^{†}	Seed
CRO	Antonia Ružić	80	1
FRA	Anna Blinkova	87	2
SUI	Simona Waltert	97	3
FRA	Léolia Jeanjean	108	4
~~AUT~~	~~Julia Grabher~~	~~111~~	~~5~~
ITA	Lucrezia Stefanini	123	6
GER	Noma Noha Akugue	128	7
ITA	Lucia Bronzetti	130	8

^{†} Ranking are as of 21 September 2026.

=== Other entrants ===
The following players received wildcards into the singles main draw :

- (Turkey) Çağla Büyükakçay
- (Turkey) Berfu Cengiz
- (France) Ksenia Efremova
- (Australia) Melisa Ercan

The following player received entry as a special exempt:

- ~~(Austria) Julia Grabher~~

The following players received entry from the qualifying draw :

- Erika Andreeva
- (Romania) Elena Ruxandra Bertea
- (United States) Fiona Crawley
- Anastasia Tikhonova

The following players received entry as lucky losers:

- (France) Loïs Boisson
- (Slovakia) Viktória Hrunčáková
- (Australia) Elena Micic

=== Withdrawals ===
Before the tournament

- (Armenia) Elina Avanesyan → replaced by Elena Pridankina
- (Georgia (country)) Ekaterine Gorgodze → replaced by (France) Loïs Boisson (LL)
- (Austria) Julia Grabher → replaced by (Australia) Elena Micic (LL)
- (Andorra) Victoria Jiménez Kasintseva → replaced by (France) Carole Monnet
- (United States) Carol Young Suh Lee → replaced by (Slovakia) Viktória Hrunčáková (LL)
- (Czech Republic) Dominika Šalková → replaced by (Czech Republic) Anna Sisková
- (Latvia) Darja Semeņistaja → replaced by Anastasia Gasanova
- (Argentina) Solana Sierra → replaced by (Turkey) Ayla Aksu

=== Retirements ===
- (Turkey) Berfu Cengiz (abdominal injury)
- Anastasia Gasanova (hip injury)

== Doubles main draw entrants ==
=== Seeds ===
Country	Player	Country	Player	Rank^{1}	Seed
	Elena Pridankina		Anastasia Tikhonova	149	1
SVK	Viktória Hrunčáková	CZE	Anna Sisková	177	2
SLO	Dalila Jakupović	BEL	Lara Salden	192	3
POL	Weronika Falkowska	USA	Alana Smith	223	4

- ^{1} Rankings as of 21 September 2026.

=== Other entrants ===
The following pair received a wildcard into the doubles main draw:

- (Romania) Elena Ruxandra Bertea / (Australia) Melisa Ercan

== Finals ==
=== Singles ===
- (France) Léolia Jeanjean def. (France) Loïs Boisson 7–6^{(7–3)}, 4–6, 6–4

=== Doubles ===
- (Italy) Angelica Moratelli / (Czech Republic) Vendula Valdmannová def. (Slovenia) Dalila Jakupović / (Belgium) Lara Salden 7–6^{(7–3)}, 6–4
