= 2021 WTA Lyon Open – Singles =

Singles
- 2021 WTA Lyon Open

Final
- Champion: (Denmark) Clara Tauson
- Runner-up: (Switzerland) Viktorija Golubic
- Score: 6–4, 6–1

Details
- Draw: 32 (6 Q / 3 WC )
- Seeds: 8

Events
Singles	Doubles
- WTA Lyon Open

Clara Tauson defeated Viktorija Golubic in the final, 6–4, 6–1 to win the singles tennis title at the 2021 WTA Lyon Open. It was her first WTA Tour title, and she won it as a qualifier. Tauson did not lose a set during the tournament, including qualifying rounds, and dropped just 35 games across seven matches. Tauson was the second Dane, after Caroline Wozniacki, to win a WTA Tour singles title. The final match was the first WTA singles final to be contested between two qualifiers since the 2017 Japan Women's Open.

Sofia Kenin was the reigning champion, but chose not to participate after undergoing surgery for appendicitis.

== Seeds ==
1. (Russia) Ekaterina Alexandrova (first round)
2. (France) Fiona Ferro (semifinals)
3. (France) Caroline Garcia (second round)
4. (France) Kristina Mladenovic (quarterfinals)
5. (France) Alizé Cornet (first round)
6. (Romania) Sorana Cîrstea (first round)
7. (Spain) Paula Badosa (semifinals)
8. (Netherlands) Arantxa Rus (second round)

== Draw ==
Key

- Q = Qualifier
- WC = Wild card
- LL = Lucky loser
- Alt = Alternate
- ITF = ITF entry
- PR = Protected ranking
- SR = Special ranking
- SE = Special exempt
- JE = Junior exempt
- JR = Junior Accelerator Programme entrant
- CO = College Accelerator Programme entrant
- NG = Next Gen Accelerator Program entrant
- w/o = Walkover
- r = Retired
- d = Defaulted

=== Finals ===
Semifinals
Q	(Denmark) Clara Tauson	7	6
7	(Spain) Paula Badosa	5	1
Q	(Switzerland) Viktorija Golubic	4	6	7^{7}
2	(France) Fiona Ferro	6	0	6^{4}

Final
Q	(Denmark) Clara Tauson	6	6
Q	(Switzerland) Viktorija Golubic	4	1

=== Top half ===
First round
1	(Russia) E Alexandrova	3	4
Q	(Denmark) C Tauson	6	6
(Hungary) T Babos	6	5	6
(Russia) V Gracheva	4	7	3
(Slovakia) V Kužmová	2	3
(Italy) C Giorgi	6	6
(Serbia) N Stojanović	6	6
6	(Romania) S Cîrstea	4	0
4	(France) K Mladenovic	5	7	6
PR	(Romania) M Buzărnescu	7	5	2
(Ukraine) K Zavatska	4	1
Q	(Russia) M Gasparyan	6	6
(Switzerland) S Vögele	7^{7}	6^{5}	6
(Romania) I Bara	6^{3}	7^{7}	3
WC	(France) H Tan	4	6	6^{5}
7	(Spain) P Badosa	6	0	7^{7}

Second round
Q	(Denmark) C Tauson	6	6
(Hungary) T Babos	2	3
(Italy) C Giorgi	2	6	7^{7}
(Serbia) N Stojanović	6	1	6^{5}
4	(France) K Mladenovic	6	6
Q	(Russia) M Gasparyan	4	2
(Switzerland) S Vögele	2	4
7	(Spain) P Badosa	6	6

Quarterfinals
Q	(Denmark) C Tauson	6	6
(Italy) C Giorgi	3	1
4	(France) K Mladenovic	5	7^{7}	2
7	(Spain) P Badosa	7	6^{5}	6

Semifinals
Q	(Denmark) C Tauson	7	6
7	(Spain) P Badosa	5	1

=== Bottom half ===
First round
8	(Netherlands) A Rus	7^{8}	6
(China) Xiy Wang	6^{6}	4
(Belgium) G Minnen	7	7
(Poland) K Kawa	5	5
(Belarus) V Lapko	7	4	3
Q	(Switzerland) V Golubic	5	6	6
(France) O Dodin	2	6	3
3	(France) C Garcia	6	2	6
5	(France) A Cornet	1	6	3
WC	(France) C Burel	6	1	6
(Belarus) A Sasnovich	7^{9}	6
WC	(Canada) E Bouchard	6^{7}	2
Q	(Italy) G Gatto-Monticone	2	6	2
Q	(Czech Republic) T Martincová	6	3	6
Q	(Poland) M Fręch	7	5	5
2	(France) F Ferro	5	7	7

Second round
8	(Netherlands) A Rus	6	2	3
(Belgium) G Minnen	4	6	6
Q	(Switzerland) V Golubic	6	6
3	(France) C Garcia	1	2
WC	(France) C Burel	7	2	6
(Belarus) A Sasnovich	5	6	0
Q	(Czech Republic) T Martincová	2	1^{r}
2	(France) F Ferro	6	4

Quarterfinals
(Belgium) G Minnen	3	6^{0}
Q	(Switzerland) V Golubic	6	7^{7}
WC	(France) C Burel	6	1	3
2	(France) F Ferro	2	6	6

Semifinals
Q	(Switzerland) V Golubic	4	6	7^{7}
2	(France) F Ferro	6	0	6^{4}

== Qualifying ==
=== Seeds ===
1. (Czech Republic) Tereza Martincová (qualified)
2. (Russia) Margarita Gasparyan (qualified)
3. (Switzerland) Viktorija Golubic (qualified)
4. (Bulgaria) Viktoriya Tomova (qualifying competition)
5. (Denmark) Clara Tauson (qualified)
6. (Austria) Barbara Haas (qualifying competition)
7. (United Kingdom) Harriet Dart (first round)
8. (Russia) Kamilla Rakhimova (qualifying competition)
9. (Serbia) Olga Danilović (first round)
10. (Switzerland) Leonie Küng (qualifying competition)
11. (China) Wang Xinyu (first round)
12. (Romania) Jaqueline Cristian (first round)

=== Qualifiers ===
1. (Czech Republic) Tereza Martincová
2. (Russia) Margarita Gasparyan
3. (Switzerland) Viktorija Golubic
4. (Poland) Magdalena Fręch
5. (Denmark) Clara Tauson
6. (Italy) Giulia Gatto-Monticone

=== Qualifying draw ===
==== First qualifier ====
First round
1	(Czech Republic) Tereza Martincová	6	6
WC	(France) Margot Yerolymos	2	1
(Japan) Yuki Naito	7^{7}	6
7	(United Kingdom) Harriet Dart	6^{5}	3

Qualifying competition
1	(Czech Republic) Tereza Martincová	6	6
(Japan) Yuki Naito	2	3

==== Second qualifier ====
First round
2	(Russia) Margarita Gasparyan	6	6
(France) Chloé Paquet	3	4
(China) You Xiaodi	6	6^{4}	3
8	(Russia) Kamilla Rakhimova	1	7^{7}	6

Qualifying competition
2	(Russia) Margarita Gasparyan	3	7^{9}	6
8	(Russia) Kamilla Rakhimova	6	6^{7}	3

==== Third qualifier ====
First round
3	(Switzerland) Viktorija Golubic	6	6
(Romania) Laura Ioana Paar	1	1
(Serbia) Natalija Kostić	0	0
10	(Switzerland) Leonie Küng	6	6

Qualifying competition
3	(Switzerland) Viktorija Golubic	6	6
10	(Switzerland) Leonie Küng	3	0

==== Fourth qualifier ====
First round
4	(Bulgaria) Viktoriya Tomova	6	6
PR	(China) Lu Jiajing	1	1
(Poland) Magdalena Fręch	6	6
9	(Serbia) Olga Danilović	1	1

Qualifying competition
4	(Bulgaria) Viktoriya Tomova	4	4
(Poland) Magdalena Fręch	6	6

==== Fifth qualifier ====
First round
5	(Denmark) Clara Tauson	6	6
WC	(France) Juline Fayard	2	0
WC	(France) Amandine Hesse	6	6
11	(China) Wang Xinyu	3	4

Qualifying competition
5	(Denmark) Clara Tauson	6	6
WC	(France) Amandine Hesse	4	2

==== Sixth qualifier ====
First round
6	(Austria) Barbara Haas	3	6	7
WC	(France) Loïs Boisson	6	2	5
(Italy) Giulia Gatto-Monticone	6	6
12	(Romania) Jaqueline Cristian	4	1

Qualifying competition
6	(Austria) Barbara Haas	6	3	3
(Italy) Giulia Gatto-Monticone	2	6	6
