= 2021 WTA Lyon Open – Doubles =

Doubles
- 2021 WTA Lyon Open

Final
- Champions: (Slovakia) Viktória Kužmová (Netherlands) Arantxa Rus
- Runners-up: (Canada) Eugenie Bouchard (Serbia) Olga Danilović
- Score: 3–6, 7–5, [10–7]

Events
Singles	Doubles
- WTA Lyon Open

Laura Ioana Paar and Julia Wachaczyk were the defending champions but lost in the quarterfinals to Viktória Kužmová and Arantxa Rus.

Kužmová and Rus went on to win the title, defeating Eugenie Bouchard and Olga Danilović in the final, 3–6, 7–5, [10–7].

== Seeds ==
1. (Slovakia) Viktória Kužmová / (Netherlands) Arantxa Rus (champions)
2. (Japan) Makoto Ninomiya / (Czech Republic) Renata Voráčová (semifinals)
3. (United States) Kaitlyn Christian / (United States) Sabrina Santamaria (first round)
4. (Russia) Ekaterina Alexandrova / (Russia) Yana Sizikova (quarterfinals)

== Draw ==
Key

- Q = Qualifier
- WC = Wild card
- LL = Lucky loser
- Alt = Alternate
- ITF = ITF entry
- PR = Protected ranking
- SR = Special ranking
- SE = Special exempt
- JE = Junior exempt
- JR = Junior Accelerator Programme entrant
- CO = College Accelerator Programme entrant
- NG = Next Gen Accelerator Program entrant
- w/o = Walkover
- r = Retired
- d = Defaulted

=== Draw ===
First round
1	(Slovakia) V Kužmová (Netherlands) A Rus	6	6
WC	(France) A Hesse (France) E Lechemia	2	1
(Russia) M Gasparyan (Sweden) C Lister	4	2
(Romania) LI Paar (Germany) J Wachaczyk	6	6
4	(Russia) E Alexandrova (Russia) Y Sizikova	7^{7}	3	[10]
(Norway) U Eikeri (Poland) P Kania-Choduń	6^{4}	6	[5]
(Romania) I Bara (Romania) M Buzărnescu	4	4
(Kazakhstan) A Danilina (Belarus) L Marozava	6	6
PR	(Russia) A Panova (Netherlands) R van der Hoek	7^{7}	2	[11]
(Slovenia) D Jakupović (Poland) K Piter	6^{4}	6	[9]
(Canada) E Bouchard (Serbia) O Danilović	6	6
3	(United States) K Christian (United States) S Santamaria	3	4
PR	(Belarus) V Lapko (Belarus) A Sasnovich	6	6
WC	(France) L Boisson (France) J Fayard	1	1
(Poland) M Fręch (Poland) K Kawa	2	4
2	(Japan) M Ninomiya (Czech Republic) R Voráčová	6	6

Quarterfinals
1	(Slovakia) V Kužmová (Netherlands) A Rus	6	6
(Romania) LI Paar (Germany) J Wachaczyk	4	4
4	(Russia) E Alexandrova (Russia) Y Sizikova	1	4
(Kazakhstan) A Danilina (Belarus) L Marozava	6	6
PR	(Russia) A Panova (Netherlands) R van der Hoek	2	6	[10]
(Canada) E Bouchard (Serbia) O Danilović	6	4	[12]
PR	(Belarus) V Lapko (Belarus) A Sasnovich	3	3
2	(Japan) M Ninomiya (Czech Republic) R Voráčová	6	6

Semifinals
1	(Slovakia) V Kužmová (Netherlands) A Rus	6	6
(Kazakhstan) A Danilina (Belarus) L Marozava	3	3
(Canada) E Bouchard (Serbia) O Danilović	6^{9}	6	[10]
2	(Japan) M Ninomiya (Czech Republic) R Voráčová	7^{11}	2	[8]

Final
1	(Slovakia) V Kužmová (Netherlands) A Rus	3	7	[10]
(Canada) E Bouchard (Serbia) O Danilović	6	5	[7]
