= 2026 Adana Open – Singles =

Singles
- 2026 Adana Open

Final
- Champion: (France) Léolia Jeanjean
- Runner-up: (France) Loïs Boisson
- Score: 7–6^{(7–3)}, 4–6, 6–4

Events
Singles	Doubles
- Adana Open

Léolia Jeanjean won the title after defeating Loïs Boisson 7–6^{(7–3)}, 4–6, 6–4 in the final.

This was the first edition of the tournament.

== Seeds ==
1. (Croatia) Antonia Ružić (semifinals)
2. (France) Anna Blinkova (quarterfinals)
3. (Switzerland) Simona Waltert (second round)
4. (France) Léolia Jeanjean (champion)
5. (Austria) Julia Grabher (withdrew)
6. (Italy) Lucrezia Stefanini (quarterfinals)
7. (Germany) Noma Noha Akugue (first round)
8. (Italy) Lucia Bronzetti (first round)

== Draw ==
Key

- Q = Qualifier
- WC = Wild card
- LL = Lucky loser
- Alt = Alternate
- ITF = ITF entry
- PR = Protected ranking
- SR = Special ranking
- SE = Special exempt
- JE = Junior exempt
- JR = Junior Accelerator Programme entrant
- CO = College Accelerator Programme entrant
- NG = Next Gen Accelerator Program entrant
- w/o = Walkover
- r = Retired
- d = Defaulted

=== Finals ===
Semifinals
1	(Croatia) Antonia Ružić	6	1	3
4	(France) Léolia Jeanjean	4	6	6
Q	Erika Andreeva	3	6	2
LL	(France) Loïs Boisson	6	4	6

Final
4	(France) Léolia Jeanjean	7^{7}	4	6
LL	(France) Loïs Boisson	6^{3}	6	4

=== Top half ===
First round
1	(Croatia) A Ružić	6	6
(Czech Republic) V Valdmannová	4	3
(Argentina) J Riera	7	6
(Czech Republic) A Sisková	5	2
(Serbia) T Kostović	6	0
WC	(Turkey) B Cengiz	1	0^{r}
(Hungary) D Gálfi	7	6
LL	(Australia) E Micic	5	0
4	(France) L Jeanjean	4	6	6
(Netherlands) S Lamens	6	3	2
(Serbia) L Radivojević	2	2
WC	(Australia) M Ercan	6	6
(France) C Monnet	6	3	6^{7}
WC	(Turkey) Ç Büyükakçay	2	6	7^{9}
Q	(Romania) ER Bertea	6	4	2
6	(Italy) L Stefanini	3	6	6

Second round
1	(Croatia) A Ružić	6	6
(Argentina) J Riera	3	4
(Serbia) T Kostović	4	7^{7}	6
(Hungary) D Gálfi	6	6^{1}	4
4	(France) L Jeanjean	3	7	6
WC	(Australia) M Ercan	6	5	4
WC	(Turkey) Ç Büyükakçay	7^{7}	3	3
6	(Italy) L Stefanini	6^{5}	6	6

Quarterfinals
1	(Croatia) A Ružić	4	6	6
(Serbia) T Kostović	6	4	2
4	(France) L Jeanjean	6	1	6
6	(Italy) L Stefanini	4	6	1

Semifinals
1	(Croatia) A Ružić	6	1	3
4	(France) L Jeanjean	4	6	6

=== Bottom half ===
First round
7	(Germany) N Noha Akugue	3	1
Q	(United States) F Crawley	6	6
E Pridankina	6	6
(Turkey) A Aksu	3	3
P Iatcenko	3	2
Q	E Andreeva	6	6
Q	A Tikhonova	6	6^{4}	3
3	(Switzerland) S Waltert	3	7^{7}	6
8	(Italy) L Bronzetti	1	2
LL	(France) L Boisson	6	6
WC	(France) K Efremova	3	6	4
(Poland) M Kubka	6	4	6
LL	(Slovakia) V Hrunčáková	4
A Gasanova	2^{r}
(Colombia) E Arango	6^{4}	2
2	(France) A Blinkova	7^{7}	6

Second round
Q	(United States) F Crawley	5	6	4
E Pridankina	7	2	6
Q	E Andreeva	6	6
3	(Switzerland) S Waltert	3	1
LL	(France) L Boisson	6	6
(Poland) M Kubka	3	2
LL	(Slovakia) V Hrunčáková	2	0
2	(France) A Blinkova	6	6

Quarterfinals
E Pridankina	6	1	3
Q	E Andreeva	1	6	6
LL	(France) L Boisson	6	6
2	(France) A Blinkova	0	1

Semifinals
Q	E Andreeva	3	6	2
LL	(France) L Boisson	6	4	6

== Qualifying ==
=== Seeds ===
1. (Czech Republic) Anna Sisková (moved to main draw)
2. (Slovakia) Viktória Hrunčáková (qualifying competition, lucky loser)
3. Erika Andreeva (qualified)
4. (United States) Fiona Crawley (qualified)
5. Anastasia Tikhonova (qualified)
6. (France) Loïs Boisson (qualifying competition, lucky loser)
7. (Romania) Elena Ruxandra Bertea (qualified)
8. (Australia) Elena Micic (qualifying competition, lucky loser)

=== Qualifiers ===
1. (Romania) Elena Ruxandra Bertea
2. Anastasia Tikhonova
3. Erika Andreeva
4. (United States) Fiona Crawley

=== Lucky losers ===
1. (Slovakia) Viktória Hrunčáková
2. (France) Loïs Boisson
3. (Australia) Elena Micic

=== Qualifying draw ===
==== First qualifier ====
First round				Qualifying competition
					(Poland) Gina Feistel
				7	(Romania) Elena Ruxandra Bertea	w/o
WC	(Turkey) Melis Keser	0	0	7	(Romania) Elena Ruxandra Bertea	w/o
7	(Romania) Elena Ruxandra Bertea	6	6

==== Second qualifier ====
First round
2	(Slovakia) Viktória Hrunčáková	6	6
(United States) Jaeda Daniel	4	3
WC	(Turkey) Ayşegül Mert	6^{3}	2
5	Anastasia Tikhonova	7^{7}	6

Qualifying competition
2	(Slovakia) Viktória Hrunčáková	1	2
5	Anastasia Tikhonova	6	6

==== Third qualifier ====
First round
3	Erika Andreeva	6	3	4
WC	(Turkey) İlay Yörük	3	6	1^{r}
(Bulgaria) Isabella Shinikova	2	1
8	(Australia) Elena Micic	6	6

Qualifying competition
3	Erika Andreeva	6	6
8	(Australia) Elena Micic	2	2

==== Fourth qualifier ====
First round
4	(United States) Fiona Crawley	4	6	6
(Latvia) Adelina Lachinova	6	3	3
WC	(Turkey) Piraye Özdemir	1	1
6	(France) Loïs Boisson	6	6

Qualifying competition
4	(United States) Fiona Crawley	2	6	7
6	(France) Loïs Boisson	6	3	5
