= 2021 Lyon Open =

2021 Lyon Open may refer to:

- 2021 ATP Lyon Open
- 2021 WTA Lyon Open
