= Adana Open =

- 2026 Adana Open

WTA 125
- Event name: Adana Open
- Location: Adana, Turkey
- Venue: Adana Tenis, Dağ ve Su Sporları Kulübü - ATDSK
- Category: WTA 125
- Surface: Hard
- Draw: 32S/16Q/16D
- Prize money: $115,000
- Website: website

Current champions (2026)
- Singles: (France) Léolia Jeanjean
- Doubles: (Italy) Angelica Moratelli (Czech Republic) Vendula Valdmannová

The Adana Open is a tournament for professional female tennis players played on outdoor hardcourts. The event is classified as a WTA 125 tournament and is held at the Adana Tennis, Mountain and Water Sports Club in Adana, Turkey. It is the first ever WTA event to be staged in the city of Adana.

== Past finals ==
=== Singles ===
Year	Champion	Runners-up	Score
2026	(France) Léolia Jeanjean	(France) Loïs Boisson	7–6^{(7–3)}, 4–6, 6–4

=== Doubles ===
Year	Champions	Runners-up	Score
2026	(Italy) Angelica Moratelli (Czech Republic) Vendula Valdmannová	(Slovenia) Dalila Jakupović (Belgium) Lara Salden	7–6^{(7–3)}, 6–4

== See also ==
- Ankara Open
- Antalya Challenger
- ENKA Open
- İstanbul Open
- Samsun Open
