= Clara Tauson =

Danish tennis player (born 2002)

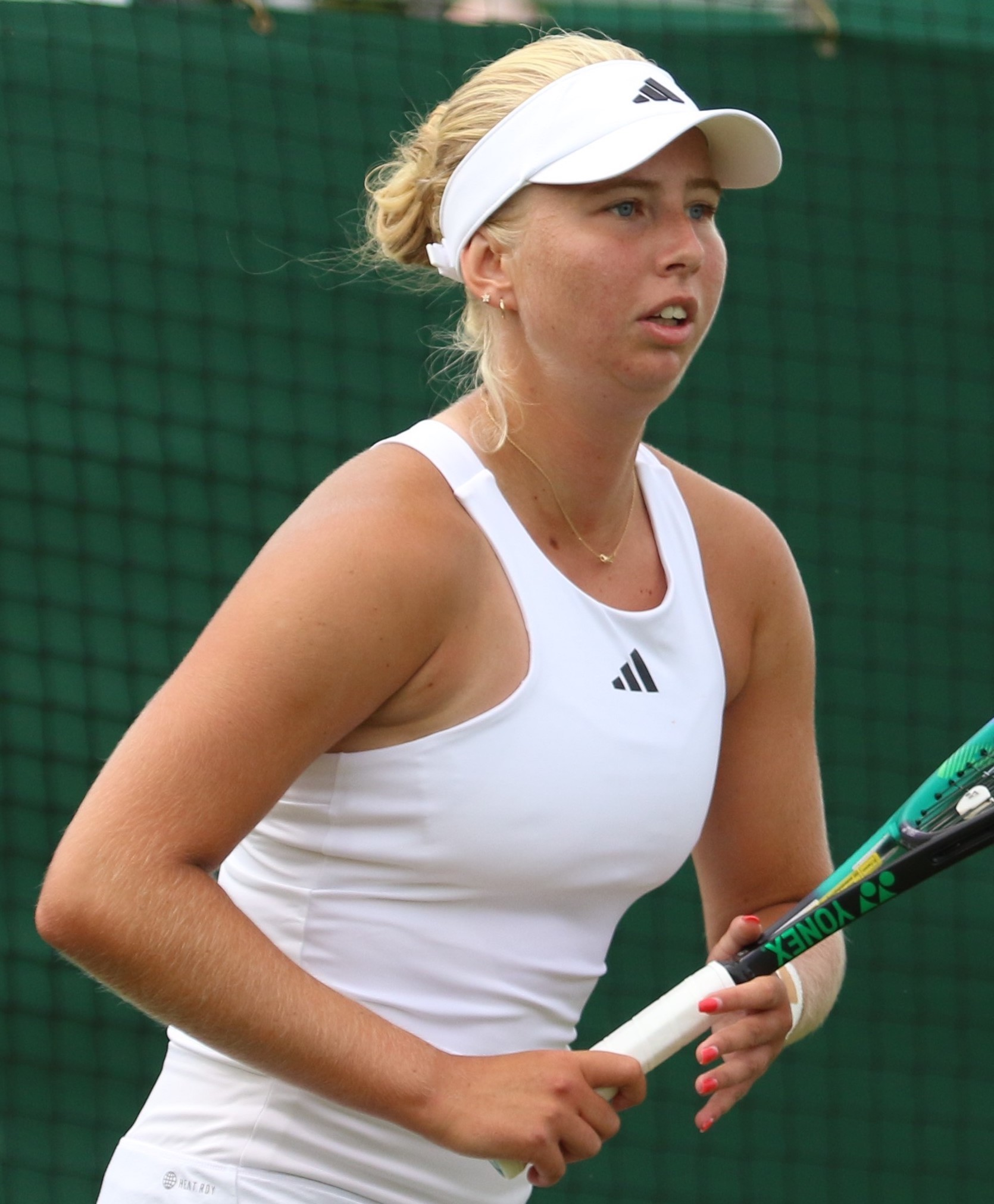
- Tauson at the 2023 Wimbledon Championships
- Country (sports): Denmark
- Residence: Kongens Lyngby, Denmark
- Born: 21 December 2002 (age 23) Copenhagen, Denmark
- Height: 1.82 m (6 ft 0 in)
- Turned pro: 2019
- Plays: Right (two-handed backhand)
- Coach: Kasper Elsvad
- Prize money: US$ 5,378,750

Singles
- Career record: 273-142
- Career titles: 3
- Highest ranking: No. 12 (8 September 2025)
- Current ranking: No. 58 (9 November 2026)

Grand Slam singles results
- Australian Open: 3R (2022, 2025, 2026)
- French Open: 4R (2024)
- Wimbledon: 4R (2025)
- US Open: 2R (2021, 2023, 2024)

Other tournaments
- Olympic Games: 1R (2024)

Doubles
- Career record: 22–42
- Career titles: 0
- Highest ranking: No. 56 (23 February 2026)
- Current ranking: No. 91 (6 August 2026)

Grand Slam doubles results
- Australian Open: 2R (2026)
- French Open: 1R (2025, 2026)
- Wimbledon: 2R (2025)
- US Open: 1R (2022, 2024, 2026)

Team competitions
- Fed Cup: 16–6
- Last updated on: 6 August 2026.

Clara Tauson (born 21 December 2002) is a Danish professional tennis player. Her career-high rankings are world No. 12 in singles, achieved on 8 September 2025, and No. 56 in doubles, achieved on 23 February 2026. Tauson has won three WTA Tour titles, all on hardcourts.

As a junior, at the age of 13, Tauson became the youngest winner of the Danish tennis championship (surpassing Caroline Wozniacki's record who won at age 14). She won the 2019 Australian Open girls' singles event and became the first Danish girl to top the junior world ranking. On the professional ITF Circuit, she has won eleven titles, the first at age 14. Tauson's WTA Tour debut came in April 2019, and her major debut came at the 2020 French Open.

In 2021, her first year as a senior, Tauson won her two first WTA Tour singles titles at the Lyon Open and at Luxembourg Open on top of one Challenger and two ITF tournament wins. This led to her entering the top 50 in the WTA rankings. Her 2022 and 2023 seasons were marred by injuries but since 2024 she has begun to move up again. In 2025 she managed to participate in all major tournaments for the first time.

Tauson has also represented Denmark in the Billie Jean King Cup, with a win–loss record of 16–6 (as of January 2025).

== Personal life ==
From 2019 to 2022, she attended Justine Henin's tennis academy in Belgium. Former tennis player Michael Tauson is her uncle. Since 2025 her coach has been Kasper Elsvad, who is also her boyfriend.

Her cousin Sebastian Tauson plays Counter-Strike professionally for the eSports Team GamerLegion.

== Career ==
Clara's talent for tennis was discovered when she was six years old. At ten, she left her local school to attend one that would allow her to focus on tennis. In the beginning, she was often compared to Caroline Wozniacki, Denmark's best player at the time. She did not find herself to be the same kind of player as Wozniacki, whom she saw as more of a baseline player. Clara Tauson started playing junior tournaments in 2013 age 10. Her family financed her until 2017 when she started playing professional tournaments. In 2019, she became a full-time professional. She focuses on singles but has also played doubles tournaments and Fed Cup.

=== 2011–2016: Early career and Danish champion ===
In 2011, Clara Tauson won the U9 tournament at the Zealand championships and the club championship for the U10. In 2014, she became triple Danish U12 champion, winning girls' singles, girls' doubles and mixed doubles with Holger Rune. She debuted on the Tennis Europe junior tour on 26 August 2013. Her first tournament victory came in 2015.

In February 2016, Tauson debuted on the ITF Junior Circuit, the premier level for worldwide competition among U18 tennis players. During the year she reached five finals, winning one. In girls' doubles she reached four finals, winning one. In August 2016, aged 13, she won the Danish Tennis Championship, beating Hannah Viller Møller in the final, and breaking the record of Caroline Wozniacki, who won it aged 14. She was awarded Danish Junior Tennis Player of the Year for 2016 for her overall performance.

=== 2017–2020: Major junior champion and No. 1 ===
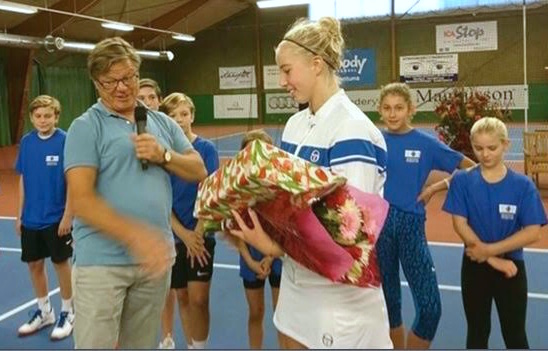
Tauson wins her first ITF title in Stockholm, 2017

In 2017, Tauson made her debut for the Denmark Fed Cup team. She lost her doubles but Denmark won the match. At the European Youth Olympic Festival in July, she won the tennis tournament as the top seed. In September she made her Grand Slam debut at the junior competition of US Open but did not make it to the main draw. The same month, she debuted on the professional ITF Women's Circuit. In October, she entered the WTA world-rankings when she reached her first ITF final. The following month, she took her first ITF title. Her biggest victories in 2018 were the European Junior Championship in girls' singles and Osaka Mayor's Cup, her first Grade-A junior tournament win. She got a sponsor contract with Japanese sports equipment producer Yonex. At the end of the year, she won bronze at the ITF Junior Masters.

She played her first junior main draw at a major at the 2019 Australian Open, where she was top-seeded in girls' singles, and won the title—the first Danish girl to do so. The following week, she also became the first Dane to top the girls' singles world ranking. Both had been done before by Kristian Pless in 1999 for a Danish boy. In April 2019, she entered her first WTA Tour tournament on a qualifier's wildcard. She made it to the main draw and lost her first-round match. In May, she played her last amateur tournament becoming a full time professional. In February 2020, she helped bringing Denmark back to Europe/Africa Group I in Fed Cup. Due to the COVID-19 pandemic, her career was put on a hold until August. In September, she broke into the WTA top 200 for the first time in her career. This allowed her to enter the French Open qualifying. The French Open, which was postponed due to the pandemic, was her first senior level Grand Slam appearance. After winning her qualification matches, Tauson beat world No. 25, Jennifer Brady from the United States, in her first main-draw match before losing in the second round to Danielle Collins, another American.

=== 2021: First WTA Tour titles, top 50 ===
Following wins at two ITF tournaments, Tauson entered the Lyon Open as a qualifier at the end of February. There, she won her first WTA Tour title, beating the top seed Ekaterina Alexandrova en route, and fellow qualifier Viktorija Golubic in the final. With the win, Tauson entered the top 100 for the first time, becoming the second youngest player in the top 100 behind Coco Gauff. The following week, she qualified for her first WTA 500 tournament in St. Petersburg Trophy, before losing to eventual winner Daria Kasatkina in the first round.

At the opening of the clay-court season in April, she was seeded for the first time on the WTA Tour at the Copa Colsanitas. However, she lost to qualifier Daniela Seguel, in the first round. Her next competition was the WTA Charleston 2 event. She reached the quarterfinals but had to retire against Camila Osorio, because of a knee injury. The injury prevented her from participating in the WTA 1000 Madrid Open. Instead, she participated in the Open de Saint-Malo in both singles and doubles. While she was eliminated early on in the singles, she managed to reach the semifinals in doubles with her partner Aliaksandra Sasnovich from Belarus. In May, she entered the main draw of the French Open, losing to Viktoria Azarenka in the second round.

In July, she entered her first Wimbledon Championships in both singles and doubles. Later that month, she was, due to cancellations, offered a ticket to the Olympic tournament in Tokyo but declined because of an injury. In the run-up to the US Open, Tauson won the Chicago Challenger, defeating Emma Raducanu in the final. At the US Open, she entered the main draw and won her first-round match against Clara Burel from France while losing her second to world No. 1, Ashleigh Barty. Two weeks later, she won her second WTA title at the Luxembourg Open, beating the defending champion Jeļena Ostapenko in the final. Even though an injury kept her out of tournaments for the next two weeks, the points earned helped her to climb into the top 50. She ended the season as runner-up in the Courmayeur Open.

=== 2022: Australian Open 3rd round, injuries ===
Tauson made her Australian Open main-draw debut as a senior defeating Astra Sharma in the first round. She then upset sixth seed Anett Kontaveit in straight sets marking her first top-ten win. She lost the following round to eventual runner-up Danielle Collins in three close sets thereby ending her so far best Grand Slam tournament. From February till March, Tauson played three WTA 1000 tournaments in a row: Qatar, Indian Wells and Miami Open. Qatar marked her WTA 1000 main-draw debut when she defeated Olympic champion Belinda Bencic in the first, round before losing to third seed Paula Badosa, in straight sets. In Indian Wells, she entered the second round as a seeded player and made it to the third round where she lost to eventual champion Iga Świątek, in three sets. In Miami, she retired in the first round against Zhang Shuai.

In Madrid, she lost in the first round. Later she withdrew from what could have been her fifth WTA 1000 event, the Italian Open, because of a back injury. This also kept her out of the French Open. Likewise in Wimbledon, her next tournament, she had to withdraw in the first round.

At the Washington Open, she played and lost her first complete match since Wimbledon. Her first win since March came at the Thoreau Tennis Open against Katie Boulter. In US Open she lost in the first round against ninth seed Garbiñe Muguruza. In August, she played and lost three doubles matches: In Washington with Emma Raducanu, in Cleveland with Camila Osorio, and in Flushing Meadows with Ann Li as her partner. The same month she also passed her first million in prize money.

After being as low as 140 in the rankings in October, she returned to tournaments and top 100 in December when she reached the final in Limoges only to get a new injury, this time in the foot, which kept her out of the 2023 Australian Open. At the same time, she had to stop the co-operation with her coach since 2019 due to a lack of finances.

=== 2023: French Open 3rd round, variable results ===
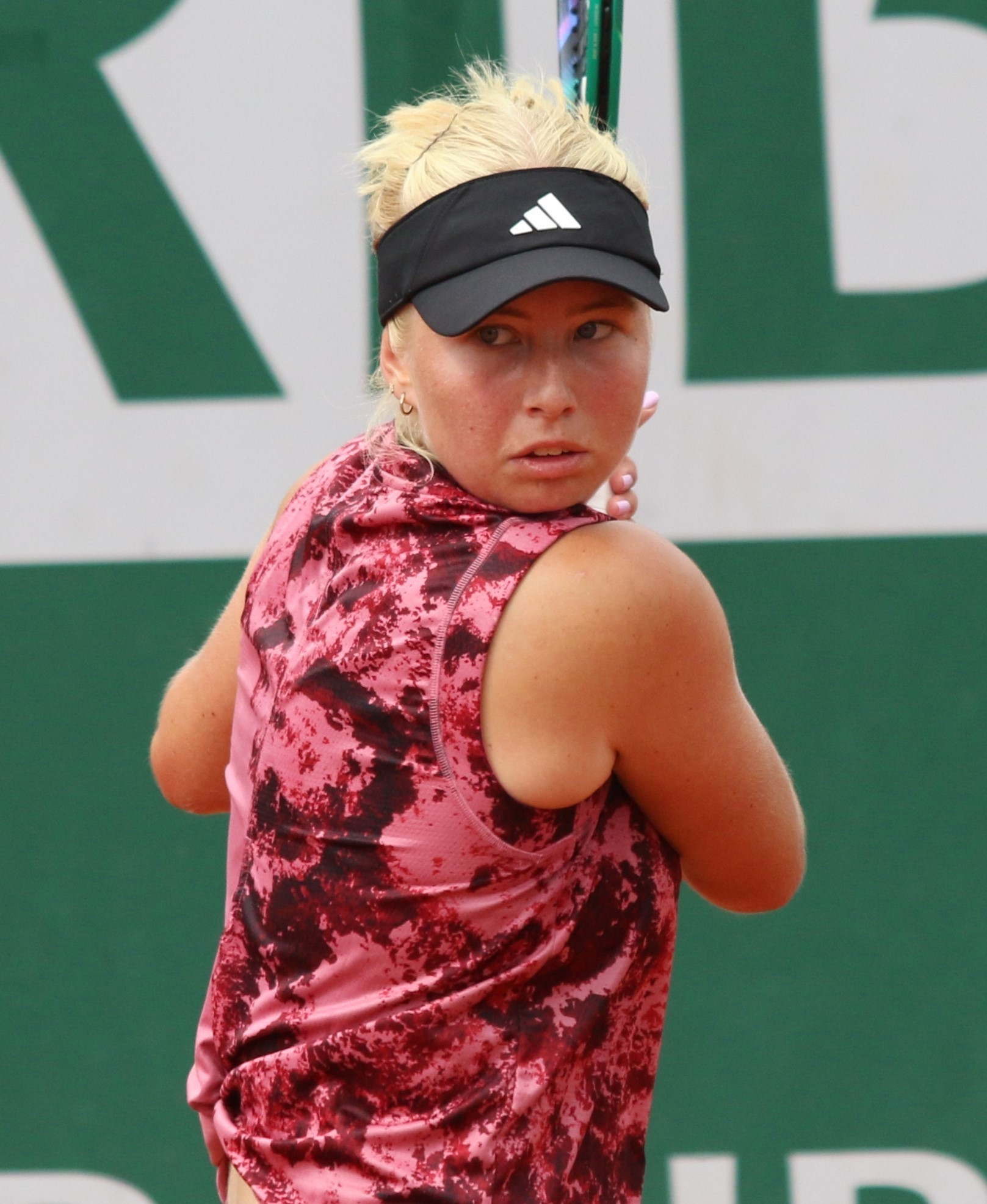
Tauson at the 2023 French Open

She returned to tournaments at the end of January at the Lyon Open but failed in qualifying. Her first main-draw win came on 8 February as a lucky loser in Linz against third seed Irina-Camelia Begu. February and March she went back to playing ITF tournaments and in April she played Billie Jean King Cup (a prerequisite for participating in the Olympic Games). During this period she slipped out of top 100.

At the French Open, as a qualifier, Tauson reached again the third round of a major defeating Aliaksandra Sasnovich and Leylah Fernandez. As a result, she moved 40 positions up in the rankings and returned to the top 100.

In the Wimbledon qualifying, she took her first victory on grass defeating Emina Bektas. She did not qualify in singles and withdrew from doubles. Later in July, she participated in Hopman Cup with her junior mixed-doubles partner Holger Rune. She won her matches but the two were eliminated after the preliminary round.

The 2023 US Open was the first since 2002 in which Denmark had three singles players: Holger Rune, Clara Tauson and Caroline Wozniacki (in order of ranking). Rune lost in first round, Tauson in the second whereas Wozniacki, who was on a wildcard, reached the fourth round. After having to withdraw from Guangzhou Open due to a heat collapse, Tauson came back at the Ningbo Open where she defeated Elina Avanesyan whom she lost to during the French Open.

=== 2024: French Open 4th round & top 50 ===
Billie Jean King Cup. In April Tauson and Caroline Wozniacki both played for Denmark. This looked like an easy promotion for Denmark to the World Group II Play-offs, but Wozniacki got sick and withdrew after just one set against Austria. Nevertheless, Clara Tauson and the rest of the Danish team managed to secure the promotion. Notably, Tauson won all her matches and beat Maria Sakkari, her second top-ten win. In November Denmark won the play-off against Mexico home and was promoted to the finals qualifiers among the 20 best nations in the world, Denmarks best result in Fed Cup/Billie Jean King Cup since its introduction in 1995.

Tournaments. In January, Tauson reached the second round of the Australian Open. She then participated in two WTA 1000 tournaments, her first since 2022, and reached second round in both. In June, she reached fourth round at the French Open, her best major performance, and at the same time she qualified for the Olympic Games. At the US Open from August till September, Tauson won the first round against Anna Karolína Schmiedlová but lost the second to Diana Shnaider, in straight sets. Later in September, she started the "Asian swing" with the Thailand Open, but it was a defeat to American Katie Volynets. In the WTA 1000 China Open, Tauson got a redeeming victory over Harriet Dart, but in the second round, she lost in a close three-set match to Jasmine Paolini. Tauson played the WTA 125 Hong Kong Open, where she beat Martina Trevisan and Varvara Gracheva but lost the final to Australian Ajla Tomljanović, in three sets. In October, Tauson came back to Osaka where in 2018 she won the juniors tournament, this time to play a WTA 250 tournament. Tauson reached the quarterfinals but lost to French player Diane Parry, in three sets.

=== 2025: Dubai final, win over No. 1, top 20 ===
In January, Tauson started the season at the WTA 250 Auckland Classic. She participated in both singles and doubles with Sloane Stephens as her partner. Due to rain, she had to play a quarterfinal and two semifinals within the same day. She reached the final in singles and the semifinals in doubles. In the singles final, she met former world No. 1 and four-time major singles champion Naomi Osaka for the first time. Osaka won the first set 6–4, before retiring due to injury. Tauson subsequently claimed her third WTA Tour singles title. It was her first title in more than three years, and it was her first outdoor title.

In February, she withdrew from Qatar Ladies Open, the first WTA 1000 tournament of the year, in the first round due to illness. On her debut at the Dubai Championships, Tauson reached the quarterfinal with a straight-sets upset over Sabalenka, avenging her previous loss and giving her the first win against a No. 1 player. Tauson then defeated first Linda Nosková and next 14th seed Karolina Muchová to reach the final. Tauson lost to Mirra Andreeva in straight sets in the final. This was the first time that she made it past the third round in a WTA 1000 tournament, and as a consequence she advanced to her best position in the singles rankings at world No. 23.

At the third WTA 1000 tournament of the year, the Indian Wells Open, Tauson got a bye in the first round due to her new ranking. She defeated Camila Osorio in the second round, recording her 16th WTA win for 2025, the most of any player in the season. In the third round, she lost to later winner Andreeva (her second title in a row). Again, Tauson participated in doubles, this time with Yulia Putintseva, and she topped her doubble ranking as a result.

At Wimbledon, where she was seeded 23, Tauson recorded her first main draw singles win against British wildcard Heather Watson. She beat Anna Kalinskaya in the second round, and former winner Elena Rybakina in the third, before losing in the fourth to eventual winner Iga Świątek. She also won her first Wimbledon doubles match with McCartney Kessler, beating British pair Harriet Dart and Maia Lumsden, but they lost in the second round to top seeds and eventual semi-finalists Kateřina Siniaková and Taylor Townsend. At the US Open, she was ousted in the first round by Alexandra Eala from the Philippines.

Because of injuries Clara Tauson did not take part in any of Denmark's Billie Jean King Cup matches that year, neither in April for the qualifiers nor in November for the play-offs.

=== 2026: Back issues ===
In January she had to quit Adelaide after just one set while she got to the third round in Australian Open. In February she reached the semi finals in Abu Dhabi and a quarter final in the WTA 1000-event in Dubai. In May, just before French Open, she revealed that she had been diagnosed with two herniated discs in her back. She did this after struggling with back issues throughout the spring. She does not intent to go into surgery but will keep playing and hope for it to go away.

22 June she won her first victory for more than three months in Bad Homburg against Diana Shnaider. She then won against olympic champinon Zheng Qinwen before losing to eventual winner of the tournament Karolina Muchová.

== Playing style ==
Tauson is a power baseliner. She is able to produce a high number of winners from her forehand and backhand side as well as overpower her opponents. She possesses a reliable serve as well, with her biggest weakness on court being her movement.

== Career statistics ==
=== Grand Slam tournament performance timeline ===
Key
W	F	SF	QF	#R	RR	Q#	DNQ	A	NH

(W) winner; (F) finalist; (SF) semifinalist; (QF) quarterfinalist; (#R) rounds 4, 3, 2, 1; (RR) round-robin stage; (Q#) qualification round; (DNQ) did not qualify; (A) absent; (NH) not held; (SR) strike rate (events won / competed); (W–L) win–loss record.
To avoid confusion and double counting, these charts are updated at the conclusion of a tournament or when the player's participation has ended.

==== Singles ====
Tournament	2020	2021	2022	2023	2024	2025	2026	SR	W–L	Win%
Australian Open	A	Q1	3R	A	2R	3R	3R	0 / 3	7–4	64%
French Open	2R	2R	A	3R	4R	3R	1R	0 / 6	9–6	60%
Wimbledon	NH	1R	1R	Q3	1R	4R	1R	0 / 4	3–4	43%
US Open	A	2R	1R	2R	2R	1R	1R	0 / 5	3–5	38%
Win–loss	1–1	2–3	2–3	3–2	5–4	7–4	2–2	0 / 19	22–19	54%
