= 2025 French Open – Women's singles =

Tennis championship

Women's singles
- 2025 French Open

Final
- Champion: (United States) Coco Gauff
- Runner-up: Aryna Sabalenka
- Score: 6–7^{(5–7)}, 6–2, 6–4
- Date: 7 June 2025

Details
- Draw: 128 (16Q / 8WC)
- Seeds: 32

Events
Singles	men	women		boys	girls
Doubles	men	women	mixed	boys	girls
WC Singles	men	women	quad	boys	girls
WC Doubles	men	women	quad	boys	girls

Qualification
Singles	men	women
- French Open

Coco Gauff defeated Aryna Sabalenka in the final, 6–7^{(5–7)}, 6–2, 6–4 to win the women's singles tennis title at the 2025 French Open. It was her first French Open singles title and second major singles title overall. It was the first French Open final between the world No. 1 and 2 since 2013, and the first at any major since the 2018 Australian Open. Sabalenka was the first woman to reach the final of three consecutive majors since Serena Williams in 2016. The final was a rematch of the Madrid final five weeks prior, won by Sabalenka.

Iga Świątek was the three-time defending champion, but lost in the semifinals to Sabalenka. The defeat ended her 26-match win streak in the event, second only to Chris Evert's 29 consecutive wins.

Ranked No. 361, Loïs Boisson was the first Frenchwoman to reach the French Open semifinals since Marion Bartoli in 2011, the lowest-ranked major semifinalist since Justine Henin (who was unranked at the time) in the 2010 Australian Open, and the first wildcard to do so at the French Open. Boisson was only the third woman in the Open Era to reach the semifinals of a major on her singles main-draw debut, after Monica Seles and Jennifer Capriati at the 1989 and 1990 French Opens, respectively. Alexandra Eala became the first Filipina to compete in the main draw of a major. With her first-round win, Victoria Azarenka became the oldest woman, at 35 years, 299 days old, to score a double bagel in a singles major main-draw match in the Open Era (Sorana Cîrstea would break Azarenka’s record by 117 days at the 2026 French Open). This was Azarenka’s second double bagel at the French Open, the first was in 2008 in the second round when she played Cîrstea. She was the first woman to achieve the feat in three different decades.

This marked the final French Open appearance of former world No. 4 and two-time doubles champion Caroline Garcia. She lost in the first round to Bernarda Pera.

== Seeds ==
1. Aryna Sabalenka (final)
2. (United States) Coco Gauff (champion)
3. (United States) Jessica Pegula (fourth round)
4. (Italy) Jasmine Paolini (fourth round)
5. (Poland) Iga Świątek (semifinals)
6. Mirra Andreeva (quarterfinals)
7. (United States) Madison Keys (quarterfinals)
8. (China) Zheng Qinwen (quarterfinals)
9. (United States) Emma Navarro (first round)
10. (Spain) Paula Badosa (third round)
11. Diana Shnaider (second round)
12. (Kazakhstan) Elena Rybakina (fourth round)
13. (Ukraine) Elina Svitolina (quarterfinals)
14. (Czech Republic) Karolína Muchová (first round)
15. (Czech Republic) Barbora Krejčíková (second round)
16. (United States) Amanda Anisimova (fourth round)
17. (Australia) Daria Kasatkina (fourth round)
18. (Croatia) Donna Vekić (second round)
19. Liudmila Samsonova (fourth round)
20. Ekaterina Alexandrova (fourth round)
21. (Latvia) Jeļena Ostapenko (third round)
22. (Denmark) Clara Tauson (third round)
23. (Brazil) Beatriz Haddad Maia (first round)
24. (Belgium) Elise Mertens (first round)
25. (Poland) Magdalena Fręch (second round)
26. (Ukraine) Marta Kostyuk (first round)
27. (Canada) Leylah Fernandez (first round)
28. (United States) Peyton Stearns (first round)
29. (Czech Republic) Linda Nosková (first round)
30. Anna Kalinskaya (first round)
31. (United States) Sofia Kenin (third round)
32. (Kazakhstan) Yulia Putintseva (third round)

== Draw ==
Key

- Q = Qualifier
- WC = Wild card
- LL = Lucky loser
- Alt = Alternate
- ITF = ITF entry
- PR = Protected ranking
- SR = Special ranking
- SE = Special exempt
- JE = Junior exempt
- JR = Junior Accelerator Programme entrant
- CO = College Accelerator Programme entrant
- NG = Next Gen Accelerator Program entrant
- w/o = Walkover
- r = Retired
- d = Defaulted

=== Finals ===
Quarterfinals
1	Aryna Sabalenka	7^{7}	6
8	(China) Zheng Qinwen	6^{3}	3
13	(Ukraine) Elina Svitolina	1	5
5	(Poland) Iga Świątek	6	7
6	Mirra Andreeva	6^{6}	3
WC	(France) Loïs Boisson	7^{8}	6
7	(United States) Madison Keys	7^{8}	4	1
2	(United States) Coco Gauff	6^{6}	6	6

Semifinals
1	Aryna Sabalenka	7^{7}	4	6
5	(Poland) Iga Świątek	6^{1}	6	0
WC	(France) Loïs Boisson	1	2
2	(United States) Coco Gauff	6	6

Final
1	Aryna Sabalenka	7^{7}	2	4
2	(United States) Coco Gauff	6^{5}	6	6

=== Top half ===
==== Section 1 ====
First round
1	A Sabalenka	6	6
K Rakhimova	1	0
Q	(Italy) L Stefanini	4	4
(Switzerland) J Teichmann	6	6
(United States) D Collins	7^{7}	6
PR	(United Kingdom) J Burrage	6^{1}	4
(Serbia) O Danilović	6	6
27	(Canada) L Fernandez	3	1
22	(Denmark) C Tauson	6	4	6
(Poland) M Linette	4	6	1
(Netherlands) A Rus	4	6	6
(Colombia) C Osorio	6	2	4
PR	(Czech Republic) P Kvitová	6	0	4
(Switzerland) V Golubic	3	6	6
Q	(Serbia) N Stojanović	3	1^{r}
16	(United States) A Anisimova	6	4

Second round
1	A Sabalenka	6	6
(Switzerland) J Teichmann	3	1
(United States) D Collins	4	6	4
(Serbia) O Danilović	6	3	6
22	(Denmark) C Tauson	7^{7}	7
(Netherlands) A Rus	6^{2}	5
(Switzerland) V Golubic	0	2
16	(United States) A Anisimova	6	6

Third round
1	A Sabalenka	6	6
(Serbia) O Danilović	2	3
22	(Denmark) C Tauson	6^{4}	4
16	(United States) A Anisimova	7^{7}	6

Fourth round
1	A Sabalenka	7	6
16	(United States) A Anisimova	5	3

==== Section 2 ====
First round
11	D Shnaider	7^{7}	6
Q	(Ukraine) A Sobolieva	6^{3}	2
(Ukraine) D Yastremska	7	6
WC	(Australia) D Aiava	5	1
Q	(Spain) L Romero Gormaz	7^{7}	6
WC	(France) T Rakotomanga Rajaonah	6^{3}	2
(Egypt) M Sherif	6^{3}	2
19	L Samsonova	7^{7}	6
28	(United States) P Stearns	0	3
(Germany) E Lys	6	6
Q	(Canada) V Mboko	6	7^{7}
(New Zealand) L Sun	1	6^{4}
(Philippines) A Eala	0	6	3
(Colombia) E Arango	6	2	6
A Pavlyuchenkova	4	3
8	(China) Q Zheng	6	6

Second round
11	D Shnaider	5	5
(Ukraine) D Yastremska	7	7
Q	(Spain) L Romero Gormaz	3	3
19	L Samsonova	6	6
(Germany) E Lys	4	4
Q	(Canada) V Mboko	6	6
(Colombia) E Arango	2	3
8	(China) Q Zheng	6	6

Third round
(Ukraine) D Yastremska	2	3
19	L Samsonova	6	6
Q	(Canada) V Mboko	3	4
8	(China) Q Zheng	6	6

Fourth round
19	L Samsonova	6^{5}	6	3
8	(China) Q Zheng	7^{7}	1	6

==== Section 3 ====
First round
4	(Italy) J Paolini	6	4	6
(China) Y Yuan	1	6	3
(Australia) A Tomljanović	6	6
(Australia) M Joint	1	3
Q	(Germany) T Korpatsch	6	1	4
LL	(Ukraine) Y Starodubtseva	2	6	6
A Potapova	5	6	7
29	(Czech Republic) L Nosková	7	1	5
18	(Croatia) D Vekić	7	6^{4}	6
A Blinkova	5	7^{7}	1
(France) C Garcia	4	4
(United States) B Pera	6	6
(Germany) L Siegemund	6^{2}	3
(Hungary) A Bondár	7^{7}	6
(Turkey) Z Sönmez	1	1
13	(Ukraine) E Svitolina	6	6

Second round
4	(Italy) J Paolini	6	6
(Australia) A Tomljanović	3	3
LL	(Ukraine) Y Starodubtseva	7^{7}	6
A Potapova	6^{4}	2
18	(Croatia) D Vekić	2	6	6^{3}
(United States) B Pera	6	4	7^{10}
(Hungary) A Bondár	6^{4}	5
13	(Ukraine) E Svitolina	7^{7}	7

Third round
4	(Italy) J Paolini	6	6
LL	(Ukraine) Y Starodubtseva	4	1
(United States) B Pera	6^{4}	6^{5}
13	(Ukraine) E Svitolina	7^{7}	7^{7}

Fourth round
4	(Italy) J Paolini	6	6^{6}	1
13	(Ukraine) E Svitolina	4	7^{8}	6

==== Section 4 ====
First round
12	(Kazakhstan) E Rybakina	6	4	6
Q	(Argentina) J Riera	1	6	4
WC	(United States) I Jovic	6	5	6
(Mexico) R Zarazúa	3	7	4
(United States) C Dolehide	3	6	6
(Belgium) G Minnen	6	3	4
P Kudermetova	7	0	2
21	(Latvia) J Ostapenko	5	6	6
26	(Ukraine) M Kostyuk	3	1
Q	(Czech Republic) S Bejlek	6	6
(Romania) J Cristian	6	6
(Australia) K Birrell	1	0
(United Kingdom) E Raducanu	7	4	6
(China) Xin Wang	5	6	3
(Slovakia) R Šramková	3	3
5	(Poland) I Świątek	6	6

Second round
12	(Kazakhstan) E Rybakina	6	6
WC	(United States) I Jovic	3	3
(United States) C Dolehide	7	3	3
21	(Latvia) J Ostapenko	5	6	6
Q	(Czech Republic) S Bejlek	6	3	3
(Romania) J Cristian	1	6	6
(United Kingdom) E Raducanu	1	2
5	(Poland) I Świątek	6	6

Third round
12	(Kazakhstan) E Rybakina	6	6
21	(Latvia) J Ostapenko	2	2
(Romania) J Cristian	2	5
5	(Poland) I Świątek	6	7

Fourth round
12	(Kazakhstan) E Rybakina	6	3	5
5	(Poland) I Świątek	1	6	7

=== Bottom half ===
==== Section 5 ====
First round
6	M Andreeva	6	6
(Spain) C Bucșa	4	3
(Netherlands) S Lamens	3	4
(United States) A Krueger	6	6
(United States) K Volynets	3	6	4
Q	(Chinese Taipei) J Garland	6	3	6
Q	(Argentina) S Sierra	6^{4}	2
32	(Kazakhstan) Y Putintseva	7^{7}	6
17	(Australia) D Kasatkina	6	3	6
(Czech Republic) K Siniaková	1	6	2
WC	(France) L Jeanjean	0	7	3
(Romania) I-C Begu	6	5	0^{r}
(Romania) E-G Ruse	7	7^{7}
(United States) M Kessler	5	6^{3}
(Japan) N Osaka	7^{7}	1	4
10	(Spain) P Badosa	6^{1}	6	6

Second round
6	M Andreeva	6	6
(United States) A Krueger	3	4
Q	(Chinese Taipei) J Garland	6^{5}	3
32	(Kazakhstan) Y Putintseva	7^{7}	6
17	(Australia) D Kasatkina	6	6
WC	(France) L Jeanjean	4	2
(Romania) E-G Ruse	6	4	4
10	(Spain) P Badosa	3	6	6

Third round
6	M Andreeva	6	6
32	(Kazakhstan) Y Putintseva	3	1
17	(Australia) D Kasatkina	6	7
10	(Spain) P Badosa	1	5

Fourth round
6	M Andreeva	6	7
17	(Australia) D Kasatkina	3	5

==== Section 6 ====
First round
14	(Czech Republic) K Muchová	3	6	1
(United States) A Parks	6	2	6
WC	(France) E Jacquemot	6	7^{7}
(Greece) M Sakkari	3	6^{4}
(Armenia) E Avanesyan	1	2
(Ukraine) A Kalinina	6	6
WC	(France) L Boisson	6	4	6
24	(Belgium) E Mertens	4	6	3
25	(Poland) M Fręch	7^{7}	6
(Tunisia) O Jabeur	6^{4}	0
Q	O Selekhmeteva	4	4
(Czech Republic) M Vondroušová	6	6
Q	(Argentina) ML Carlé	4	0
(United States) A Li	6	6
(Romania) A Todoni	2	4
3	(United States) J Pegula	6	6

Second round
(United States) A Parks	2	7^{7}	1
WC	(France) E Jacquemot	6	6^{4}	6
(Ukraine) A Kalinina	1	2
WC	(France) L Boisson	6	6
25	(Poland) M Fręch	0	6	3
(Czech Republic) M Vondroušová	6	4	6
(United States) A Li	3	6^{3}
3	(United States) J Pegula	6	7^{7}

Third round
WC	(France) E Jacquemot	3	6	5
WC	(France) L Boisson	6	0	7
(Czech Republic) M Vondroušová	6	4	2
3	(United States) J Pegula	3	6	6

Fourth round
WC	(France) L Boisson	3	6	6
3	(United States) J Pegula	6	4	4

==== Section 7 ====
First round
7	(United States) M Keys	6	6
Q	(Australia) D Saville	2	1
Q	(France) C Monnet	7^{7}	1	1
(United Kingdom) K Boulter	6^{4}	6	6
PR	(Belgium) Y Wickmayer	0	0
V Azarenka	6	6
(France) V Gracheva	3	1
31	(United States) S Kenin	6	6
23	(Brazil) B Haddad Maia	6	3	1
(United States) H Baptiste	4	6	6
Q	(Japan) N Hibino	6	7
(Japan) M Uchijima	1	5
WC	(France) D Parry	2	1
(United States) R Montgomery	6	6
(Spain) J Bouzas Maneiro	6	6
9	(United States) E Navarro	0	1

Second round
7	(United States) M Keys	6	6
(United Kingdom) K Boulter	1	3
V Azarenka	6^{5}	4
31	(United States) S Kenin	7^{7}	6
(United States) H Baptiste	6	6
Q	(Japan) N Hibino	3	2
(United States) R Montgomery	4	6	5
(Spain) J Bouzas Maneiro	6	4	7

Third round
7	(United States) M Keys	4	6	7
31	(United States) S Kenin	6	3	5
(United States) H Baptiste	7^{7}	6
(Spain) J Bouzas Maneiro	6^{4}	1

Fourth round
7	(United States) M Keys	6	7
(United States) H Baptiste	3	5

==== Section 8 ====
First round
15	(Czech Republic) B Krejčíková	7^{7}	6
(Germany) T Maria	6^{4}	3
V Kudermetova	7	6
(Bulgaria) V Tomova	5	1
LL	(United States) T Townsend	3	2
(Italy) E Cocciaretto	6	6
(Italy) L Bronzetti	3	2
20	E Alexandrova	6	6
30	A Kalinskaya	4	5
(Czech Republic) M Bouzková	6	7
(United Kingdom) S Kartal	6	6
E Andreeva	0	2
WC	(France) C Paquet	6	3	5
Q	(Czech Republic) T Valentová	4	6	7
(Australia) O Gadecki	2	2
2	(United States) C Gauff	6	6

Second round
15	(Czech Republic) B Krejčíková	0	3
V Kudermetova	6	6
(Italy) E Cocciaretto	1	3
20	E Alexandrova	6	6
(Czech Republic) M Bouzková	6	6
(United Kingdom) S Kartal	1	4
Q	(Czech Republic) T Valentová	2	4
2	(United States) C Gauff	6	6

Third round
V Kudermetova	2	2
20	E Alexandrova	6	6
(Czech Republic) M Bouzková	1	6^{3}
2	(United States) C Gauff	6	7^{7}

Fourth round
20	E Alexandrova	0	5
2	(United States) C Gauff	6	7

== Championship match statistics ==
Category	(United States) Gauff	Sabalenka
1st serve %	65/103 (63%)	69/116 (59%)
1st serve points won	39 of 65 = 60%	33 of 69 = 48%
2nd serve points won	19 of 38 = 50%	22 of 47 = 47%
Total service points won	56 of 103 = 54.37%	55 of 116 = 47.41%
Aces	3	2
Double faults	8	6
Winners	30	37
Unforced errors	30	70
Net points won	14 of 24 = 58%	25 of 40 = 63%
Break points converted	9 of 21 = 43%	6 of 13 = 46%
Return points won	61 of 116 = 53%	45 of 103 = 44%
Total points won	119	100

== Seeded players ==
The following are the seeded players. Seedings are based on WTA rankings as of 19 May 2025. Rankings and points before are as of 26 May 2025.

Seed	Rank	Player	Points before	Points defending	Points earned	Points after	Status
1	1	Aryna Sabalenka	10,683	430	1,300	11,553	Runner-up, lost to (United States) Coco Gauff [2]
2	2	(United States) Coco Gauff	6,863	780	2,000	8,083	Champion, defeated Aryna Sabalenka [1]
3	3	(United States) Jessica Pegula	6,243	0	240	6,483	Fourth round lost to (France) Loïs Boisson [WC]
4	4	(Italy) Jasmine Paolini	5,865	1,300	240	4,805	Fourth round lost to (Ukraine) Elina Svitolina [13]
5	5	(Poland) Iga Świątek	5,838	2,000	780	4,618	Semifinals lost to Aryna Sabalenka [1]
6	6	Mirra Andreeva	4,985	780	430	4,635	Quarterfinals lost to (France) Loïs Boisson [WC]
7	8	(United States) Madison Keys	4,184	130	430	4,484	Quarterfinals lost to (United States) Coco Gauff [2]
8	7	(China) Zheng Qinwen	4,368	130	430	4,668	Quarterfinals lost to Aryna Sabalenka [1]
9	9	(United States) Emma Navarro	3,879	240	10	3,649	First round lost to (Spain) Jéssica Bouzas Maneiro
10	10	(Spain) Paula Badosa	3,684	130	130	3,684	Third round lost to (Australia) Daria Kasatkina [17]
11	12	Diana Shnaider	3,108	10	70	3,168	Second round lost to (Ukraine) Dayana Yastremska
12	11	(Kazakhstan) Elena Rybakina	3,548	430	240	3,358	Fourth round lost to (Poland) Iga Świątek [5]
13	14	(Ukraine) Elina Svitolina	2,845	240	430	3,035	Quarterfinals lost to (Poland) Iga Świątek [5]
14	13	(Czech Republic) Karolína Muchová	2,919	0	10	2,929	First round lost to (United States) Alycia Parks
15	15	(Czech Republic) Barbora Krejčíková	2,664	10	70	2,724	Second round lost to Veronika Kudermetova
16	16	(United States) Amanda Anisimova	2,634	70	240	2,804	Fourth round lost to Aryna Sabalenka [1]
17	17	(Australia) Daria Kasatkina	2,631	70	240	2,801	Fourth round lost to Mirra Andreeva [6]
18	19	(Croatia) Donna Vekić	2,226	130	70	2,166	Second round lost to (United States) Bernarda Pera
19	18	Liudmila Samsonova	2,280	130	240	2,390	Fourth round lost to (China) Zheng Qinwen [8]
20	20	Ekaterina Alexandrova	2,148	10	240	2,378	Fourth round lost to (United States) Coco Gauff [2]
21	21	(Latvia) Jeļena Ostapenko	2,140	70	130	2,200	Third round lost to (Kazakhstan) Elena Rybakina [12]
22	22	(Denmark) Clara Tauson	2,098	240	130	1,988	Third round lost to (United States) Amanda Anisimova [16]
23	23	(Brazil) Beatriz Haddad Maia	2,091	10	10	2,091	First round lost to (United States) Hailey Baptiste
24	24	(Belgium) Elise Mertens	1,866	130	10	1,746	First round lost to (France) Loïs Boisson [WC]
25	26	(Poland) Magdalena Fręch	1,755	10	70	1,815	Second round lost to (Czech Republic) Markéta Vondroušová
26	25	(Ukraine) Marta Kostyuk	1,796	70	10	1,736	First round lost to (Czech Republic) Sára Bejlek [Q]
27	27	(Canada) Leylah Fernandez	1,735	130	10	1,615	First round lost to (Serbia) Olga Danilović
28	33	(United States) Peyton Stearns	1,536	130	10	1,416	First round lost to (Germany) Eva Lys
29	29	(Czech Republic) Linda Nosková	1,628	70	10	1,568	First round lost to Anastasia Potapova
30	28	Anna Kalinskaya	1,717	70	10	1,657	First round lost to (Czech Republic) Marie Bouzková
31	30	(United States) Sofia Kenin	1,618	130	130	1,618	Third round lost to (United States) Madison Keys [7]
32	31	(Kazakhstan) Yulia Putintseva	1,615	70	130	1,675	Third round lost to Mirra Andreeva [6]

== Other entry information ==
=== Wild cards ===
- (Australia) Destanee Aiava
- (France) Loïs Boisson
- (France) Elsa Jacquemot
- (France) Léolia Jeanjean
- (United States) Iva Jovic
- (France) Chloé Paquet
- (France) Diane Parry
- (France) Tiantsoa Rakotomanga Rajaonah

=== Protected ranking ===
- (Czech Republic) Petra Kvitová (14)
- ~~(Romania) Sorana Cîrstea (37)~~
- (United Kingdom) Jodie Burrage (85)
- (Belgium) Yanina Wickmayer (91)

=== Qualifiers ===
- (Czech Republic) Sára Bejlek
- (Argentina) María Lourdes Carlé
- (Chinese Taipei) Joanna Garland
- (Japan) Nao Hibino
- (Germany) Tamara Korpatsch
- (Canada) Victoria Mboko
- (France) Carole Monnet
- (Argentina) Julia Riera
- (Spain) Leyre Romero Gormaz
- (Australia) Daria Saville
- Oksana Selekhmeteva
- (Argentina) Solana Sierra
- (Ukraine) Anastasiia Sobolieva
- (Italy) Lucrezia Stefanini
- (Serbia) Nina Stojanović
- (Czech Republic) Tereza Valentová

=== Lucky losers ===
- (Ukraine) Yuliia Starodubtseva
- (United States) Taylor Townsend

=== Withdrawals ===
The entry list was released based on the WTA rankings for the week of 14 April 2025.

- ‡ (Spain) Sara Sorribes Tormo (85) → replaced by (China) Yuan Yue (101)
- § (Switzerland) Belinda Bencic (42) → replaced by (United States) Taylor Townsend (LL)
- § (Romania) Sorana Cîrstea (37 PR) → replaced by (Ukraine) Yuliia Starodubtseva (LL)

‡ – withdrew from entry list
§ – withdrew from main draw

Preceded by 2025 Australian Open – Women's singles	Grand Slam women's singles	Succeeded by 2025 Wimbledon Championships – Women's singles
