= 2026 Adana Open – Doubles =

Doubles
- 2026 Adana Open

Final
- Champion: (Italy) Angelica Moratelli (Czech Republic) Vendula Valdmannová
- Runner-up: (Slovenia) Dalila Jakupović (Belgium) Lara Salden
- Score: 7–6^{(7–3)}, 6–4

Events
Singles	Doubles
- Adana Open

Angelica Moratelli and Vendula Valdmannová won the title, defeating Dalila Jakupović and Lara Salden 7–6^{(7–3)}, 6–4 in the final.

This was the first edition of the tournament.

== Seeds ==
1. Elena Pridankina / Anastasia Tikhonova (semifinals)
2. (Slovakia) Viktória Hrunčáková / (Czech Republic) Anna Sisková (quarterfinals)
3. (Slovenia) Dalila Jakupović / (Belgium) Lara Salden (final)
4. (Poland) Weronika Falkowska / (United States) Alana Smith (semifinals)

== Draw ==
Key

- Q = Qualifier
- WC = Wild card
- LL = Lucky loser
- Alt = Alternate
- ITF = ITF entry
- PR = Protected ranking
- SR = Special ranking
- SE = Special exempt
- JE = Junior exempt
- JR = Junior Accelerator Programme entrant
- CO = College Accelerator Programme entrant
- NG = Next Gen Accelerator Program entrant
- w/o = Walkover
- r = Retired
- d = Defaulted

First round
1	E Pridankina; A Tikhonova	6	6
P Iatcenko (Switzerland) N Karamoko	4	3
(Turkey) A Aksu (Turkey) A Mert	6	6
WC	(Romania) ER Bertea (Australia) M Ercan	0	3
3	(Slovenia) D Jakupović (Belgium) L Salden	3	6	[10]
(Germany) N Noha Akugue (Bosnia and Herzegovina) A Wagner	6	3	[7]
(United States) F Crawley (United States) J Daniel	6	6
(Australia) T McGiffin (Australia) E Micic	1	4
(United Kingdom) F Christie (United Kingdom) E Silva	2	5
(France) C Monnet (Argentina) J Riera	6	7
(Colombia) E Arango (Croatia) A Ružić	4	2
4	(Poland) W Falkowska (United States) A Smith	6	6
(Hungary) D Gálfi (Switzerland) S Waltert	6	1	[9]
(Italy) A Moratelli (Czech Republic) V Valdmannová	2	6	[11]
(Croatia) M Dražić (France) M Mattel	6^{3}	7^{7}	[7]
2	(Slovakia) V Hrunčáková (Czech Republic) A Sisková	7^{7}	6^{2}	[10]

Quarterfinals
1	E Pridankina; A Tikhonova	6	6
(Turkey) A Aksu (Turkey) A Mert	0	2
3	(Slovenia) D Jakupović (Belgium) L Salden	6	4	[11]
(United States) F Crawley (United States) J Daniel	3	6	[9]
(France) C Monnet (Argentina) J Riera	2	3
4	(Poland) W Falkowska (United States) A Smith	6	6
(Italy) A Moratelli (Czech Republic) V Valdmannová	6	7^{7}
2	(Slovakia) V Hrunčáková (Czech Republic) A Sisková	1	6^{5}

Semifinals
1	E Pridankina; A Tikhonova	2	2
3	(Slovenia) D Jakupović (Belgium) L Salden	6	6
4	(Poland) W Falkowska (United States) A Smith	2	7	[6]
(Italy) A Moratelli (Czech Republic) V Valdmannová	6	5	[10]

Final
3	(Slovenia) D Jakupović (Belgium) L Salden	6^{3}	4
(Italy) A Moratelli (Czech Republic) V Valdmannová	7^{7}	6
