= 2021 WTA Lyon Open =

Women's tennis tournament in Lyon, France

- Date: 1 – 7 March
- Edition: 2nd
- Category: WTA 250
- Draw: 32S / 16D
- Prize money: $235,238
- Surface: Hard - Indoors
- Location: Lyon, France
- Venue: Halle Tony Garnier

Champions

Singles
- (Denmark) Clara Tauson

Doubles
- (Slovakia) Viktória Kužmová / (Netherlands) Arantxa Rus
- WTA Lyon Open

The 2021 WTA Lyon Open (also known as the Open 6ème Sens — Métropole de Lyon for sponsorship reasons) is a women's tennis tournament played on indoor hard courts. It is the second edition of the Lyon Open (WTA) and an International tournament on the 2021 WTA Tour. It will take place at the Halle Tony Garnier in Lyon, France, from 1 to 7 March 2021.

== Champions ==
=== Singles ===
- (Denmark) Clara Tauson def. (Switzerland) Viktorija Golubic 6–4, 6–1.

This was Tauson's first WTA singles title.

=== Doubles ===
- (Slovakia) Viktória Kužmová / (Netherlands) Arantxa Rus def. (Canada) Eugenie Bouchard / (Serbia) Olga Danilović 3–6, 7–5, [10–7].

== Points and prize money ==
=== Point distribution ===
Event	W	F	SF	QF	Round of 16	Round of 32	Q	Q2	Q1
Singles	280	180	110	60	30	1	18	12	1
Doubles	280	180	110	60	1	—N/a	—N/a	—N/a	—N/a

=== Prize money ===
Event	W	F	SF	QF	Round of 16	Round of 32^{1}	Q2	Q1
Singles	€23,548	€13,224	€8,145	€4,677	€2,963	€2,157	€1,575	€1,024
Doubles*	€8,306	€4,838	€3,064	€1,854	€1,412	—N/a	—N/a	—N/a

^{1}Qualifiers prize money is also the Round of 32 prize money.
*per team

== Singles main draw entrants ==
=== Seeds ===
Country	Player	Ranking^{1}	Seed
RUS	Ekaterina Alexandrova	33	1
FRA	Fiona Ferro	45	2
FRA	Caroline Garcia	46	3
FRA	Kristina Mladenovic	51	4
FRA	Alizé Cornet	58	5
ROU	Sorana Cîrstea	67	6
ESP	Paula Badosa	73	7
NED	Arantxa Rus	78	8

- ^{1} Rankings as of 22 February 2021.

=== Other entrants ===
The following players received wildcards into the main draw:

- (Canada) Eugenie Bouchard
- (France) Clara Burel
- (France) Harmony Tan

The following players received entry into the main draw using a protected ranking:

- (Romania) Mihaela Buzărnescu
- (Belarus) Vera Lapko

The following players received entry from the qualifying draw:

- (Poland) Magdalena Fręch
- (Russia) Margarita Gasparyan
- (Italy) Giulia Gatto-Monticone
- (Switzerland) Viktorija Golubic
- (Czech Republic) Tereza Martincová
- (Denmark) Clara Tauson

=== Withdrawals ===
Before the tournament

- (Kazakhstan) Zarina Diyas → replaced by (Poland) Katarzyna Kawa
- (Belgium) Kirsten Flipkens → replaced by (Switzerland) Stefanie Vögele
- (United States) Coco Gauff → replaced by (Romania) Irina Bara
- (Slovenia) Kaja Juvan → replaced by (Ukraine) Katarina Zavatska
- (Ukraine) Marta Kostyuk → replaced by (Belgium) Greet Minnen
- (Ukraine) Kateryna Kozlova → replaced by (France) Océane Dodin
- (Argentina) Nadia Podoroska → replaced by (China) Wang Xiyu

== Doubles main draw entrants ==
=== Seeds ===
Country	Player	Country	Player	Rank^{1}	Seed
SVK	Viktória Kužmová	NED	Arantxa Rus	130	1
JPN	Makoto Ninomiya	CZE	Renata Voráčová	132	2
USA	Kaitlyn Christian	USA	Sabrina Santamaria	146	3
RUS	Ekaterina Alexandrova	RUS	Yana Sizikova	226	4

- Rankings as of February 8, 2021.

=== Other entrants ===
The following pairs received wildcards into the doubles main draw:

- (France) Loïs Boisson / (France) Juline Fayard
- (France) Amandine Hesse / (France) Elixane Lechemia

The following pairs received entry into the doubles main draw using protected rankings:

- (Belarus) Vera Lapko / (Belarus) Aliaksandra Sasnovich
- (Russia) Alexandra Panova / (Netherlands) Rosalie van der Hoek

=== Withdrawals ===
Before the tournament

- (Russia) Natela Dzalamidze / (Sweden) Cornelia Lister → replaced by (Russia) Margarita Gasparyan / (Sweden) Cornelia Lister
