= Léolia Jeanjean =

French tennis player (born 1995)

- Jeanjean at the 2026 Wimbledon Championships
- Country (sports): France
- Residence: Toulouse, France
- Born: 14 August 1995 (age 31) Montpellier, France
- Height: 1.68 m (5 ft 6 in)
- Turned pro: 2012
- Plays: Right (two-handed backhand)
- College: Baylor, Arkansas and Lynn
- Coach: Guillaume Peyre
- Prize money: US$ 2,224,205

Singles
- Career record: 300–185
- Career titles: 1 WTA 125
- Highest ranking: No. 89 (9 November 2026)
- Current ranking: No. 89 (9 November 2026)

Grand Slam singles results
- Australian Open: 1R (2023, 2024, 2025, 2026)
- French Open: 3R (2022)
- Wimbledon: 2R (2026)
- US Open: 2R (2026)

Doubles
- Career record: 68–58
- Career titles: 1 WTA 125
- Highest ranking: No. 162 (18 March 2024)
- Current ranking: No. 419 (9 November 2026)

Grand Slam doubles results
- French Open: 1R (2023, 2024, 2025, 2026)

Grand Slam mixed doubles results
- French Open: 2R (2026)
- Last updated on: 10 November 2026.

Léolia Jeanjean (born 14 August 1995) is a French tennis player. She has been ranked by the WTA as high as No. 89 in singles, achieved on 9 November 2026, and No. 162 in doubles, reached on 18 March 2024. Jeanjean has won two WTA 125 titles, one in singles and one in doubles.

== Early life ==
Léolia was born on 14 August 1995 in Montpellier, France, to Laurent and Isabelle Jeanjean. Her father worked as a sheet-metal mechanic and her mother as a secretary. She grew up in La Grande-Motte, near Montpellier, and began playing tennis at the age of six.

Jeanjean trained at the Academy of Montpellier and attracted attention as a promising junior player. She secured a sponsorship agreement with Nike at a young age, while her parents temporarily left their jobs to support her tennis development.

== Juniors ==
In 2008, Jeanjean reached the quarterfinals of Les Petits As, losing to eventual champion Daria Saville (then Gavrilova). She received wildcards for the junior singles and doubles events at the 2009 French Open, partnering with Darja Salnikova in doubles, but was eliminated in the first round of both competitions. Returning in 2010, she again lost in the first round of singles but reached the doubles quarterfinals alongside Clothilde de Bernardi.

Around the age of 14, Jeanjean suffered a serious knee injury involving repeated dislocations of the kneecap, which interrupted her development and limited her ability to compete. The injury also led to the loss of her sponsorship agreement with Nike.

== Collegiate tennis ==
After her junior career was disrupted by injuries, Jeanjean moved to the United States to combine her education with college tennis. She attended Baylor University during the 2014–15 season before transferring to the University of Arkansas, where she played for two years. She subsequently transferred to Lynn University in Boca Raton, Florida.

During her studies, she earned bachelor's degrees in sociology and criminal justice, followed by a Master of Business Administration (MBA) in finance from Lynn University in 2019. In her final college season in 2019, she went undefeated in both singles (21–0) and doubles (29–0) and was named the Sunshine State Conference Female Athlete of the Year.

== Professional ==
=== 2022: Major debut and third round, top 150 ===
Jeanjean made her Grand Slam tournament main-draw debut at the 2022 French Open, after receiving a wildcard for the singles tournament. She scored her first major match win against world No. 45, Nuria Párrizas Díaz, and then defeated eighth-seed and former world No. 1, Karolína Plíšková, 6–2, 6–2 in the second round. This was her first victory over a player ranked in the top 10. Ranked No. 227, she became the third-lowest ranked player to defeat a top-10 opponent in the season, following No. 409 Daria Saville's upset of Ons Jabeur in Indian Wells, and No. 231 Laura Siegemund's win (via retirement) over Maria Sakkari in Stuttgart. She was also the lowest ranked female player to win a match at Roland Garros against a top-ten opponent, since Conchita Martínez defeated Lori McNeil in 1988. As a result, she reached the top 150 for the first time in her career, climbing up nearly 80 positions.

In November, Jeanjean finished runner-up at the Montevideo Open losing in the final to Diana Shnaider.

=== 2023: Australian Open debut, first WTA 125 title ===
On her debut at the Australian Open, she entered this major as a lucky loser, but was beaten in the first round by Nadia Podoroska.

Partnering Sara Errani, Jeanjean won her first WTA 125 doubles title at the MundoTenis Open in Brazil, defeating Julia Lohoff and Conny Perrin in the final.

=== 2024: Second WTA 125 doubles final ===
Jeanjean qualified for the Australian Open, losing in the first round to Caroline Dolehide. She reached the quarterfinals at the Puerto Vallarta 125, defeating Yanina Wickmayer and Rebecca Marino, before losing to eventual champion McCartney Kessler.

Having qualified for the French Open, Jeanjean was drawn to face top seed Iga Świątek in the opening round and lost in straight sets. At the Makarska International Championships, she recorded wins over wildcard entrant Tena Lukas and Miriam Bulgaru to make it through to the quarterfinals, where she lost to eighth seed and eventual champion Katie Volynets.

Partnering with Kristina Mladenovic, Jeanjean reached the doubles final at the Copa Chile, but withdrew before the match due to an elbow injury. In singles, she reached the quarterfinals at the Argentina Open, defeating Francisca Jorge and second seed Suzan Lamens. Jeanjean lost in the last eight to Sára Bejlek. The following week, at the MundoTenis Open, she overcame Daria Lodikova, Nina Stojanović, and Valeriya Strakhova to advance to the semifinals, where her run was ended by seventh seed and eventual champion, Maja Chwalińska.

=== 2025: WTA Tour quarterfinal, top 100 ===
Jeanjean qualified for the Australian Open, but lost in the first round of the main draw to Jodie Burrage. She reached her first Tour-level quarterfinal at the Copa Colsanitas, defeating Kathinka von Deichmann and fellow French player Séléna Janicijevic, before her run was ended by qualifier Julieta Pareja. Despite the loss, Jeanjean reached the top 100 in the singles rankings on 26 May 2025. In November, she made it through to the final at the WTA 125 Copa Chile, but lost to Oleksandra Oliynykova.

=== 2026: Wimbledon debut and first win, WTA 125 title ===
Jeanjean qualified for the main draw at the WTA 1000 events in Madrid and Rome, reaching the second round at both, losing to Coco Gauff and Jasmine Paolini, respectively. She qualified to make her main-draw debut at Wimbledon and defeated Veronika Erjavec, before losing to Daria Snigur in the second round.

Entering the US Open as a wildcard, Jeanjean overcame qualifier Arantxa Rus for her first win at this major, before losing to 24th seed Anastasia Potapova in the second round. In October, Jeanjean won her maiden WTA 125 singles title at the Adana Open, defeating fellow French player Loïs Boisson in the final.

== Performance timeline ==
Key
W	F	SF	QF	#R	RR	Q#	DNQ	A	NH

(W) winner; (F) finalist; (SF) semifinalist; (QF) quarterfinalist; (#R) rounds 4, 3, 2, 1; (RR) round-robin stage; (Q#) qualification round; (DNQ) did not qualify; (A) absent; (NH) not held; (SR) strike rate (events won / competed); (W–L) win–loss record.
To avoid confusion and double counting, these charts are updated at the conclusion of a tournament or when the player's participation has ended.

Only main-draw results in WTA Tour, Grand Slam tournaments, Billie Jean King Cup, United Cup, Hopman Cup and Olympic Games are included in win–loss records.

=== Singles ===
Current through the 2026 China Open.

Tournament	2022	2023	2024	2025	2026	SR	W–L	Win %
Grand Slam tournaments
Australian Open	A	1R	1R	1R	1R	0 / 4	0–4	0%
French Open	3R	2R	1R	2R	1R	0 / 5	4–5	44%
Wimbledon	Q3	Q1	A	Q1	2R	0 / 1	1–1	50%
US Open	1R	Q2	Q1	1R	2R	0 / 3	1–3	25%
Win–Loss	2–2	1–2	0–2	1–3	2–4	0 / 13	6–13	32%
WTA 1000 tournaments
Qatar Open	A	NTI	A	A	A	0 / 0	0–0	–
Dubai Championships	NTI	A	A	A	A	0 / 0	0–0	–
Indian Wells Open	A	Q1	A	Q2	Q2	0 / 0	0–0	–
Miami Open	A	A	A	Q1	Q1	0 / 0	0–0	–
Madrid Open	A	Q2	A	A	2R	0 / 1	1–1	50%
Italian Open	A	Q1	A	Q2	2R	0 / 1	1–1	50%
Canadian Open	A	A	A	1R	1R	0 / 2	0–2	0%
Cincinnati Open	A	A	A	2R	Q2	0 / 1	1–1	50%
China Open	NH	A	A	Q1	A	0 / 0	0–0	–
Wuhan Open	NH		A	A	A	0 / 0	0–0	–
Career statistics
Tournaments	6	7	2	12	9	Career total: 36		
Overall win–loss	3–6	4–7	0–2	5–12	4–10	0 / 36	16–37	30%
Year-end ranking	125	128	170	106	90	$2,224,205		

== WTA Tour finals ==
=== Doubles: 1 (runner-up) ===
Legend WTA 250 (0–1)	Finals by surface Hard (0–1)	Finals by setting Indoor (0–1)

Result	Date	Tournament	Tier	Surface	Partner	Opponents	Score
Loss	Oct 2023	Transylvania Open, Romania	WTA 250	Hard (i)	(Ukraine) Valeriya Strakhova	(United Kingdom) Jodie Burrage (Switzerland) Jil Teichmann	1–6, 4–6

== WTA 125 finals ==
=== Singles: 3 (1 title, 2 runner-ups) ===
Result	W–L	Date	Tournament	Surface	Opponent	Score
Loss	0–1	Nov 2022	Montevideo Open, Uruguay	Clay	Diana Shnaider	4–6, 4–6
Loss	0–2	Nov 2025	Colina Challenger, Chile	Clay	(Ukraine) Oleksandra Oliynykova	5–7, 1–6
Win	1–2	Oct 2026	Adana Open, Turkey	Hard	(France) Loïs Boisson	7–6^{(7–3)}, 4–6, 6–4

=== Doubles: 3 (1 title, 2 runner-ups) ===
Result	W–L	Date	Tournament	Surface	Partner	Opponents	Score
Win	1–0	Nov 2023	Brasil Tennis Cup, Brazil	Clay	(Italy) Sara Errani	(Germany) Julia Lohoff (Switzerland) Conny Perrin	7–5, 3–6, [10–7]
Loss	1–1	Nov 2024	Colina Challenger, Chile	Clay	(France) Kristina Mladenovic	(Egypt) Mayar Sherif (Serbia) Nina Stojanović	walkover
Loss	1–2	Nov 2025	Colina Challenger, Chile	Clay	(Ukraine) Valeriya Strakhova	(Spain) Sara Sorribes Tormo (Argentina) María Lourdes Carlé	2–6, 4–6

== ITF Circuit finals ==
=== Singles: 13 (4 titles, 9 runner-ups) ===
Legend W100 tournaments (0–1) W80 tournaments (0–1) W60/75 tournaments (1–4) W50 tournaments (1–1) W25 tournaments (1–1) W10/15 tournaments (1–1)	Finals by surface Hard (3–6) Clay (1–3)

Result	W–L	Date	Tournament	Tier	Surface	Opponent	Score
Loss	0–1	Dec 2013	ITF Borriol, Spain	10k	Clay	(Russia) Maria Marfutina	6–1, 5–7, 3–6
Win	1–1	May 2021	ITF Šibenik, Croatia	W15	Clay	(Bosnia and Herzegovina) Nefisa Berberović	6–2, 6–4
Loss	1–2	Feb 2022	Porto Indoor, Portugal	W25	Hard (i)	(Japan) Moyuka Uchijima	3–6, 1–6
Loss	1–3	Apr 2022	Open de Seine-et-Marne, France	W60	Hard	(Czech Republic) Linda Nosková	3–6, 4–6
Win	2–3	Apr 2022	ITF Calvi, France	W25	Hard	(France) Tessah Andrianjafitrimo	6–2, 6–2
Loss	2–4	Aug 2023	Aberto da República, Brazil	W80	Hard	(Switzerland) Lulu Sun	4–6, 6–4, 2–6
Loss	2–5	Sep 2023	Caldas da Rainha Open, Portugal	W60	Hard	(Croatia) Petra Marčinko	4–6, 1–6
Loss	2–6	Sep 2024	ITF Pilar, Argentina	W50	Clay	(Argentina) Solana Sierra	2–6, ret.
Win	3–6	Oct 2024	Internationaux de Poitiers, France	W75+H	Hard (i)	(France) Diana Martynov	6–2, 6–3
Win	4–6	Nov 2024	Open Nantes Atlantique, France	W50	Hard (i)	(France) Sara Cakarevic	6–1, 6–3
Loss	4–7	Jan 2025	Bengaluru Open, India	W100	Hard	(Germany) Tatjana Maria	7–6^{(0)}, 3–6, 4–6
Loss	4–8	Jan 2025	Pune Open, India	W75	Hard	Tatiana Prozorova	6–4, 5–7, 3–6
Loss	4–9	Mar 2025	Vacaria Open, Brazil	W75	Clay	(United Kingdom) Francesca Jones	6–1, 4–6, 1–6

=== Doubles: 8 (3 titles, 5 runner-ups) ===
Legend W80 tournaments W60 tournaments W25 tournaments W10/15 tournaments	Finals by surface Hard (2–4) Clay (1–1)

Result	W–L	Date	Tournament	Tier	Surface	Partner	Opponents	Score
Win	1–0	Dec 2013	ITF Borriol, Spain	10k	Clay	(France) Marine Partaud	(United States) Tina Tehrani (Netherlands) Mandy Wagemaker	4–6, 6–1, [10–3]
Win	2–0	Jun 2019	ITF Cancún, Mexico	W15	Hard	(France) Tiphanie Fiquet	(United States) Hind Abdelouahid (United States) Alyssa Tobita	6–4, 6–4
Loss	2–1	Feb 2020	ITF Cancún, Mexico	W15	Hard	(France) Tiphanie Fiquet	(Brazil) Carolina Alves (Venezuela) Andrea Gámiz	7–5, 2–6, [9–11]
Loss	2–2	Apr 2021	ITF Calvi, France	W25	Hard	(France) Audrey Albié	(North Macedonia) Lina Gjorcheska (France) Amandine Hesse	5–7, 4–6
Loss	2–3	Sep 2021	ITF Saint-Palais-sur-Mer, France	W25	Clay	(France) Audrey Albié	(Kazakhstan) Anna Danilina (Ukraine) Valeriya Strakhova	7–6^{(7)}, 2–6, [4–10]
Loss	2–4	Oct 2021	Internationaux de Poitiers, France	W80	Hard (i)	(France) Audrey Albié	(Georgia (country)) Mariam Bolkvadze (United Kingdom) Samantha Murray Sharan	6–7^{(5)}, 0–6
Loss	2–5	Feb 2022	Porto Indoor, Portugal	W25	Hard (i)	(France) Audrey Albié	(Greece) Valentini Grammatikopoulou (Netherlands) Quirine Lemoine	2–6, 3–6
Win	3–5	Jul 2023	ITF Feira de Santana, Brazil	W60	Hard	(Ukraine) Valeriya Strakhova	(United States) Haley Giavara (United States) Abigail Rencheli	7–5, 6–4

== Wins against top 10 players ==
- Jeanjean has a 1–3 record against players who were, at the time the match was played, ranked in the top 10.

#	Opponent	Rk	Tournament	Surface	Rd	Score	Rk	Years	Ref
1	(Czech Republic) Karolína Plíšková	8	French Open, Paris	Clay	2R	6–2, 6–2	227	2022	

- Key: (Rk) first use, opponent rank; (Rd) round; (Rk) 2nd use, player rank; (Ref) reference; (F) final; (SF) semifinal; (QF) quarterfinal; (#R) rounds 4, 3, 2, 1; (RR) round-robin stage; (Q#) qualifying rounds or stages (3), 2, 1.
