= Juline Fayard =

French tennis player

- Country (sports): France
- Born: 10 May 2003 (age 21)
- Plays: Right-handed (two-handed backhand)
- Prize money: $1,110

Singles
- Career record: 10–11
- Career titles: 0

Doubles
- Career record: 0–1
- Career titles: 0
- Last updated on: 2 March 2021.

Juline Fayard (born 10 May 2003) is a French tennis player.

Fayard made her WTA main draw debut at the 2021 Lyon Open (WTA), where she received a wildcard into the doubles main draw, partnering Loïs Boisson.
