= Vendula Valdmannová =

Czech tennis player (born 2007)

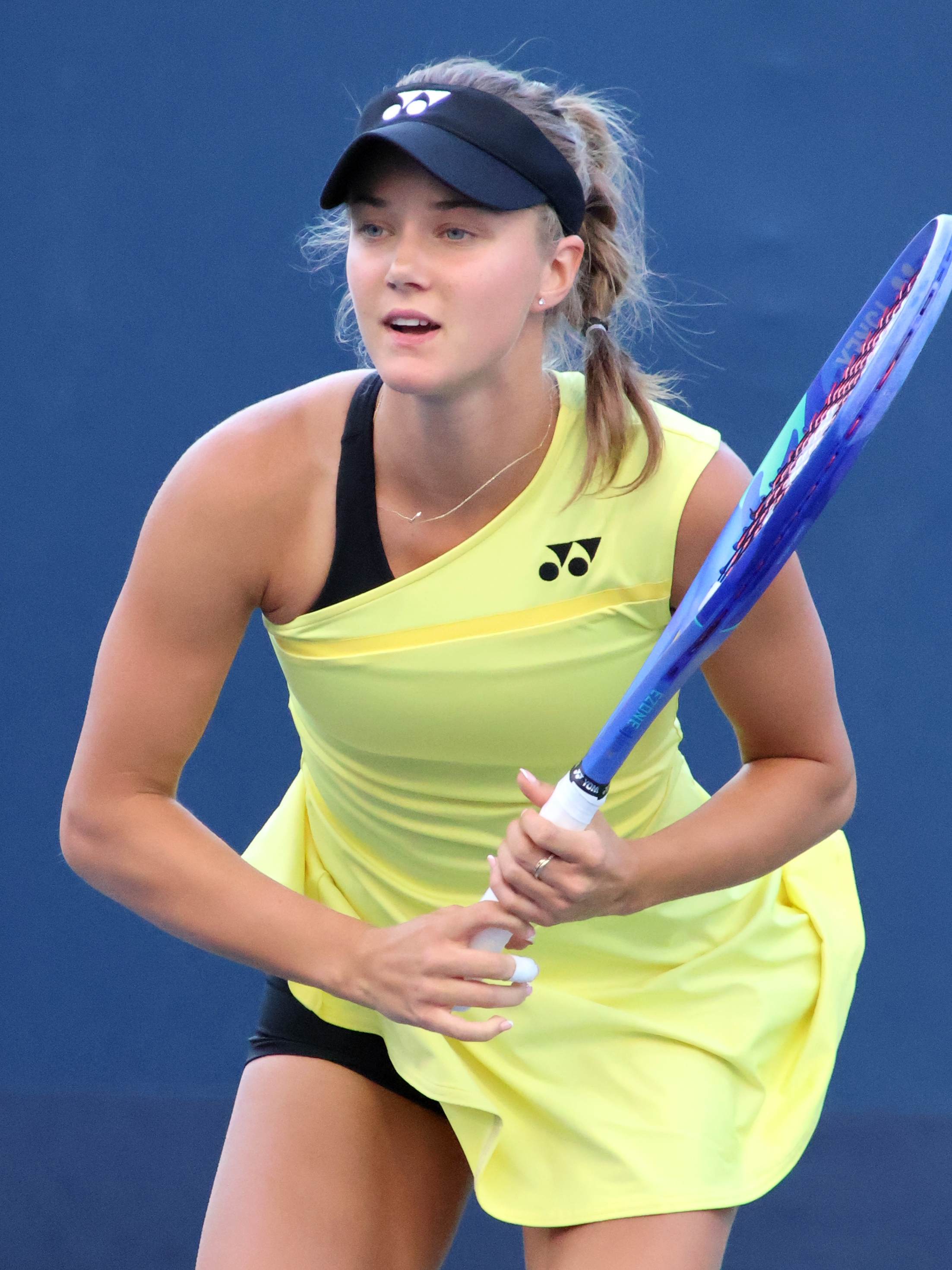
- Valdmannová at the 2026 US Open
- Country (sports): Czech Republic
- Born: 10 December 2007 (age 18) Havířov, Czech Republic
- Plays: Right-handed (two-handed backhand)
- Prize money: US$ 194,186

Singles
- Career record: 94–50
- Career titles: 5 ITF
- Highest ranking: No. 147 (21 September 2026)
- Current ranking: No. 168 (9 November 2026)

Grand Slam singles results
- Wimbledon: Q1 (2026)
- US Open: Q3 (2026)

Doubles
- Career record: 48–18
- Career titles: 7 ITF
- Highest ranking: No. 125 (12 October 2026)
- Current ranking: No. 140 (9 November 2026)
- Last updated on: 9 November 2026.

Vendula Valdmannová (born 10 December 2007) is a Czech tennis player. She has a career-high WTA singles ranking of world No. 147, achieved on 21 September 2026, and a best doubles ranking of No. 125, set on 12 October 2026. Partnering with Kristina Penickova, Valdmannová won the junior 2025 Wimbledon doubles title.

== Early life ==
Valdmannová was born in Havířov. She initially played for Tennis Hill Havířov, before moving to TK Precheza in Přerov.

== Career ==
=== Juniors ===
In January 2024, Valdmannová reached the girls' doubles quarterfinals of the Australian Open with Rose Marie Nijkamp. That July, she reached the girls' singles semifinals of Wimbledon, upsetting fourth seed Tyra Caterina Grant and tenth seed Jeline Vandromme in the process. Valdmannová had a career-high juniors combined ranking of No. 15 on 30 September 2024.

Junior Grand Slam performance

Singles:

- Australian Open: 3R (2024)
- French Open: 2R (2024, 2025)
- Wimbledon: SF (2024, 2025)
- US Open: 3R (2024)

Doubles:

- Australian Open: SF (2025)
- French Open: QF (2025)
- Wimbledon: W (2025)
- US Open: 1R (2024)

=== 2023-2025: Pro beginnings ===
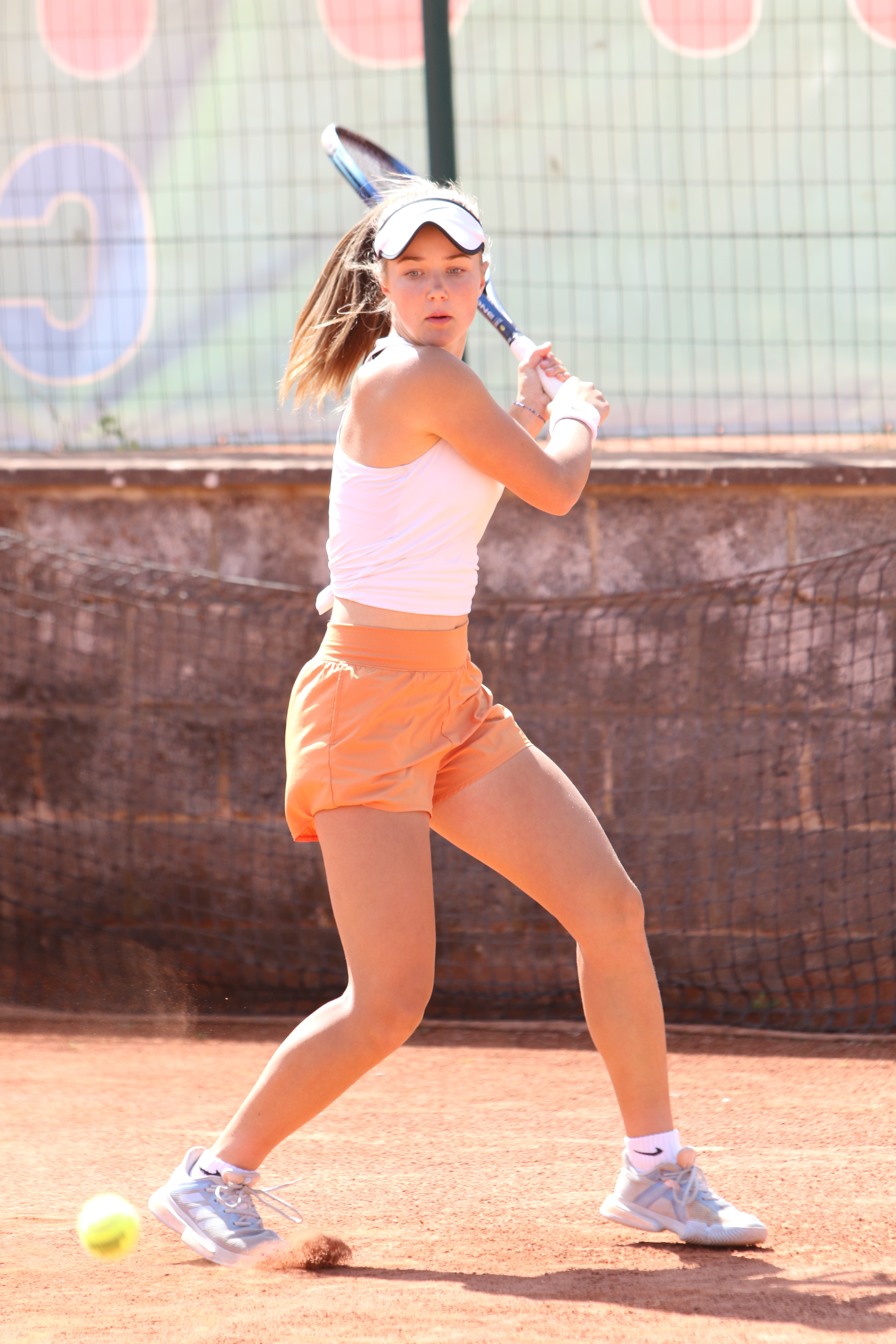
Valdmannová at the Astrid Bowl in 2023

In August 2023, Valdmannová qualified for the main draw of the Zubr Cup, but lost in the first round to Angelica Moratelli. Later that year, she received a wildcard into the main draw of the Trnava Women's Indoor 3, but lost in the first round to Stephanie Wagner. In May 2024, Valdmannová qualified for the main draw of the Empire Slovak Open, but lost in the first round to Tatiana Prozorova.

In 2025, Valdmannová won her first professional titles, two in singles and five in doubles including two W75 trophies.

=== 2026: WTA Tour debut and first win ===
Valdmannová qualified to make her WTA Tour main-draw debut at the Ostrava Open, losing to fourth seed Rebecca Šrámková in the first round. At the same tournament, she received a wildcard entry into the doubles main-draw with Julie Paštiková and they reached the quarterfinals after a win over top seeds Aldila Sutjiadi and Giuliana Olmos.

At the SP Open, she defeated Laura Pigossi recording her first WTA Tour main-draw win, before losing to fourth seed Anna Blinkova in the second round. Partnering with Angelica Moratelli, Valdmannová won her maiden WTA 125 doubles title at the Adana Open, defeating Dalila Jakupović and Lara Salden in the final.

== National representation ==
Valdmannová represented the Czech Republic at the 2025 United Cup.

== Performance timeline ==
Key
W	F	SF	QF	#R	RR	Q#	P#	DNQ	A	Z#	PO	G	S	B	NMS	NTI	P	NH

(W) winner; (F) finalist; (SF) semifinalist; (QF) quarterfinalist; (#R) rounds 4, 3, 2, 1; (RR) round-robin stage; (Q#) qualification round; (P#) preliminary round; (DNQ) did not qualify; (A) absent; (Z#) Davis/Fed Cup Zonal Group (with number indication) or (PO) play-off; (G) gold, (S) silver or (B) bronze Olympic/Paralympic medal; (NMS) not a Masters tournament; (NTI) not a Tier I tournament; (P) postponed; (NH) not held; (SR) strike rate (events won / competed); (W–L) win–loss record.
To avoid confusion and double counting, these charts are updated at the conclusion of a tournament or when the player's participation has ended.

=== Singles ===
Tournament	2026	SR	W–L	Win%
Grand Slam tournaments
Australian Open	A	0 / 0	0–0	–
French Open	A	0 / 0	0–0	–
Wimbledon	Q1	0 / 0	0–0	–
US Open	Q3	0 / 0	0–0	–
Win–Loss	0–0	0 / 0	0–0	–

== WTA 125 finals ==
=== Doubles: 1 (1 runner-up) ===
Result	Date	Tournament	Surface	Partner	Opponents	Score
Win	Sep 2026	Adana Open, Turkey	Hard	(Italy) Angelica Moratelli	(Slovenia) Dalila Jakupović (Belgium) Lara Salden	7–6^{(7–3)}, 6–4

== ITF Circuit finals ==
=== Singles: 6 (5 titles, 1 runner-up) ===
Legend W50 tournaments (3–0) W35 tournaments (1–1) W15 tournaments (1–0)	Finals by surface Hard (4–1) Carpet (1–0)

Result	W–L	Date	Tournament	Tier	Surface	Opponent	Score
Loss	0–1	Aug 2025	ITF Vigo, Spain	W35	Hard	(United States) Carol Young Suh Lee	3–6, 4–6
Win	1–1	Sep 2025	ITF Heraklion, Greece	W15	Hard	(Ukraine) Kateryna Diatlova	6–4, 6–3
Win	2–1	Sep 2025	ITF Monastir, Tunisia	W35	Hard	(United Kingdom) Mika Stojsavljevic	6–1, 6–1
Win	3–1	Apr 2026	ITF Roehampton, UK	W50	Hard	(Slovakia) Viktória Hrunčáková	3–2 ret.
Win	4–1	May 2026	ITF Lopota, Georgia	W50	Hard	(United States) Carolyn Ansari	4–6, 6–4, 6–0
Win	5–1	Aug 2026	ITF Dublin, Ireland	W50	Carpet	(United Kingdom) Amelia Rajecki	6–1, 7–6^{(7–4)}

=== Doubles: 8 (7 titles, 1 runner-up) ===
Legend W75 tournaments (3–1) W50 tournaments (1–0) W35 tournaments (3–0)	Finals by surface Hard (7–1)

Result	W–L	Date	Tournament	Tier	Surface	Partner	Opponent	Score
Win	1–0	Aug 2025	ITF Vigo, Spain	W35	Hard	(Netherlands) Joy de Zeeuw	(United States) Carol Young Suh Lee (Australia) Tenika McGiffin	7–5, 6–2
Win	2–0	Sep 2025	ITF Monastir, Tunisia	W35	Hard	(United Kingdom) Mika Stojsavljevic	(United Kingdom) Lauryn John-Baptiste (Egypt) Sandra Samir	6–4, 6–4
Win	3–0	Oct 2025	ITF Birmingham, UK	W35	Hard (i)	(United Kingdom) Mimi Xu	(United Kingdom) Alicia Dudeney (Slovakia) Katarína Kužmová	6–3, 7–6^{(7–5)}
Win	4–0	Oct 2025	Internationaux de Poitiers, France	W75	Hard (i)	(Czech Republic) Anna Sisková	(Poland) Anna Hertel (France) Tiphanie Lemaître	6–1, 6–4
Win	5–0	Nov 2025	ITF Fujairah Championships, UAE	W75	Hard	(Slovakia) Viktória Hrunčáková	(Australia) Olivia Gadecki (United Kingdom) Mika Stojsavljevic	6–4, 6–3
Loss	5–1	Jan 2026	ITF Leszno, Poland	W75	Hard (i)	(United Kingdom) Mika Stojsavljevic	(United Kingdom) Madeleine Brooks (United Kingdom) Amelia Rajecki	6–7^{(2–7)}, 6–7^{(6–8)}
Win	6–1	Mar 2026	Open de Seine-et-Marne, France	W50	Hard (i)	(United Kingdom) Mika Stojsavljevic	(United Kingdom) Madeleine Brooks (United Kingdom) Amelia Rajecki	7–6^{(7–4)}, 4–6, [10–4]
Win	7–1	Apr 2026	ITF Lopota, Georgia	W75	Hard	(Poland) Martyna Kubka	(India) Rutuja Bhosale (India) Ankita Raina	6–2, 6–3

== Junior Grand Slam tournament finals ==
=== Doubles: 1 (title) ===
Result	Year	Tournament	Surface	Partner	Opponents	Score
Win	2025	Wimbledon	Grass	(United States) Kristina Penickova	(United States) Thea Frodin (United States) Julieta Pareja	6–4, 6–2
