= Loïs Boisson =

French tennis player (born 2003)

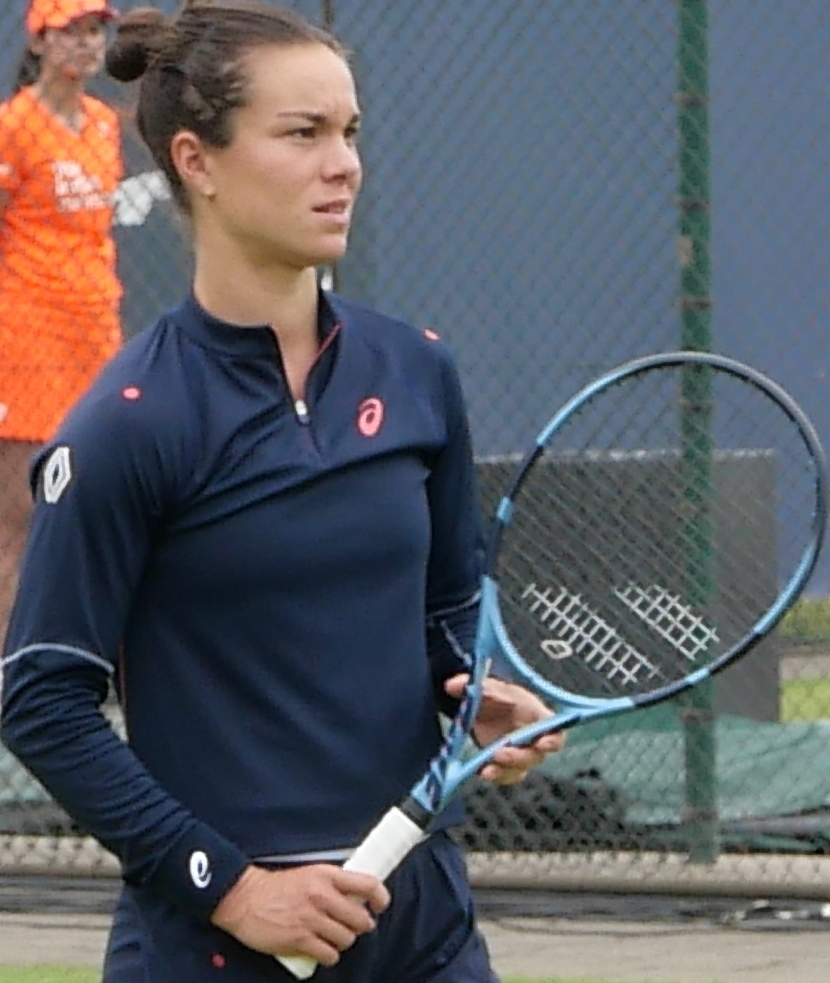
- Boisson at the 2026 Libéma Open
- Country (sports): France
- Born: 16 May 2003 (age 23) Dijon, France
- Height: 1.75 m (5 ft 9 in)
- Plays: Right-handed (two-handed backhand)
- Coach: Carlos Martínez Comet (Dec 2025-)
- Prize money: US$ 1,328,769

Singles
- Career record: 147–91
- Career titles: 1
- Highest ranking: No. 34 (2 February 2026)
- Current ranking: No. 262 (9 November 2026)

Grand Slam singles results
- French Open: SF (2025)
- Wimbledon: 1R (2026)
- US Open: 1R (2025, 2026)

Doubles
- Career record: 2–14
- Career titles: 0
- Highest ranking: No. 1,044 (17 April 2023)

Grand Slam doubles results
- French Open: 1R (2025)
- US Open: 1R (2025)
- Last updated on: 12 November 2026.

Loïs Boisson (French pronunciation: [lɔis bwasɔ̃]; born 16 May 2003) is a French professional tennis player. She has a career-high singles ranking of No. 34 by the WTA, achieved on 2 February 2026. Her most notable result is reaching the semifinals at the 2025 French Open, on her main-draw debut, becoming the first wildcard player in the Open Era to accomplish the feat. A few months later, she won her first main circuit title at the 2025 Hamburg Open – Women's singles.

== Early life ==
Loïs Boisson was born on 16 May 2003 in Dijon, France. Her father, Yann Boisson, was a professional basketball player who later worked in club management, including at Jeanne d'Arc Dijon Basket. Her mother is named Christine, and she has a brother, who also played basketball, and a sister.

Boisson initially played basketball before discovering tennis at around the age of eight during a family holiday in Corsica. She subsequently began training at ASPTT Dijon under coach Patrick Larose, who recognized her potential at an early age. Growing up, she regarded Rafael Nadal as her tennis idol.

In 2014, at the age of 11, Boisson moved with her family to southeastern France after her father joined the staff of AS Monaco Basket. She trained at the Tennis Club de Beaulieu-sur-Mer under Stéphane Gloaguen from 2014 to 2019. She subsequently spent several months at the Piatti Tennis Center in Bordighera, Italy, where she trained alongside Jannik Sinner. In 2020, her family relocated to the Annecy area, and she continued her tennis development near Lyon, working with coaches Thomas Voiturier and Florian Reynet.

== Career ==
=== 2021: WTA Tour debut ===
Boisson made her WTA Tour debut at the 2021 WTA Lyon Open, having received a wildcard into the doubles main draw, partnering Juline Fayard.

=== 2024: First WTA 125 title, top 200 ===
Following three titles on the ITF Circuit earlier in the year, Boisson won her first WTA 125 title in Saint-Malo, defeating Chloé Paquet in three sets in the final. She entered the top 200 as a result. She was slated to receive a wildcard for her major main-draw debut at the French Open but missed the event, after injuring her left knee, tearing her ACL a week before Roland Garros, at the 2024 Trophée Clarins.

=== 2025: Major and top 50 debuts, French No. 1, WTA title ===
In May, ranked No. 361, on her Grand Slam tournament debut at the French Open, Boisson reached a semifinal for the first time, recording her first major wins, as a wildcard, defeating 24th seed Elise Mertens, Anhelina Kalinina, fellow wildcard Elsa Jacquemot, world No. 3, Jessica Pegula, and world No. 6 and former semifinalist, Mirra Andreeva. Boisson was the first woman to make the quarterfinals in her major main-draw debut since Carla Suárez Navarro made the last eight in 2008 as a qualifier. Boisson became the lowest-ranked quarterfinalist and semifinalist at Roland Garros in the last 40 years, and the lowest quarterfinalist at any major event since 2017 (No. 418 Kanepi at the US Open). She became the first woman in 35 years to reach the semifinals at their first major since Jennifer Capriati in 1990, and the first Frenchwoman since Marion Bartoli in 2011, into the Roland Garros semifinals. Her run was ended by eventual champion and second seed Coco Gauff. As a result, she reached world No. 65, moving nearly 300 positions up and entering the top 100 in the singles rankings with the biggest leap of the 21st century. She became the French No. 1 player on 9 June 2025.

In June, Boisson requested a wildcard into the main draw of Wimbledon, but was turned down. with tournament organisers stating "wildcards are usually offered on the basis of past performance at Wimbledon or to increase British interest". Instead, using her protected ranking, she entered qualifying as the top seed but was defeated in the first round by Canadian Carson Branstine, in three sets.

In July, Boisson won her maiden tour title at the Hamburg Open by defeating second seed Dayana Yastremska in the semifinals and defending champion Anna Bondár in the final. As a result, she entered the top 50 of the WTA rankings.

=== 2026: Injury lay-off and comeback ===
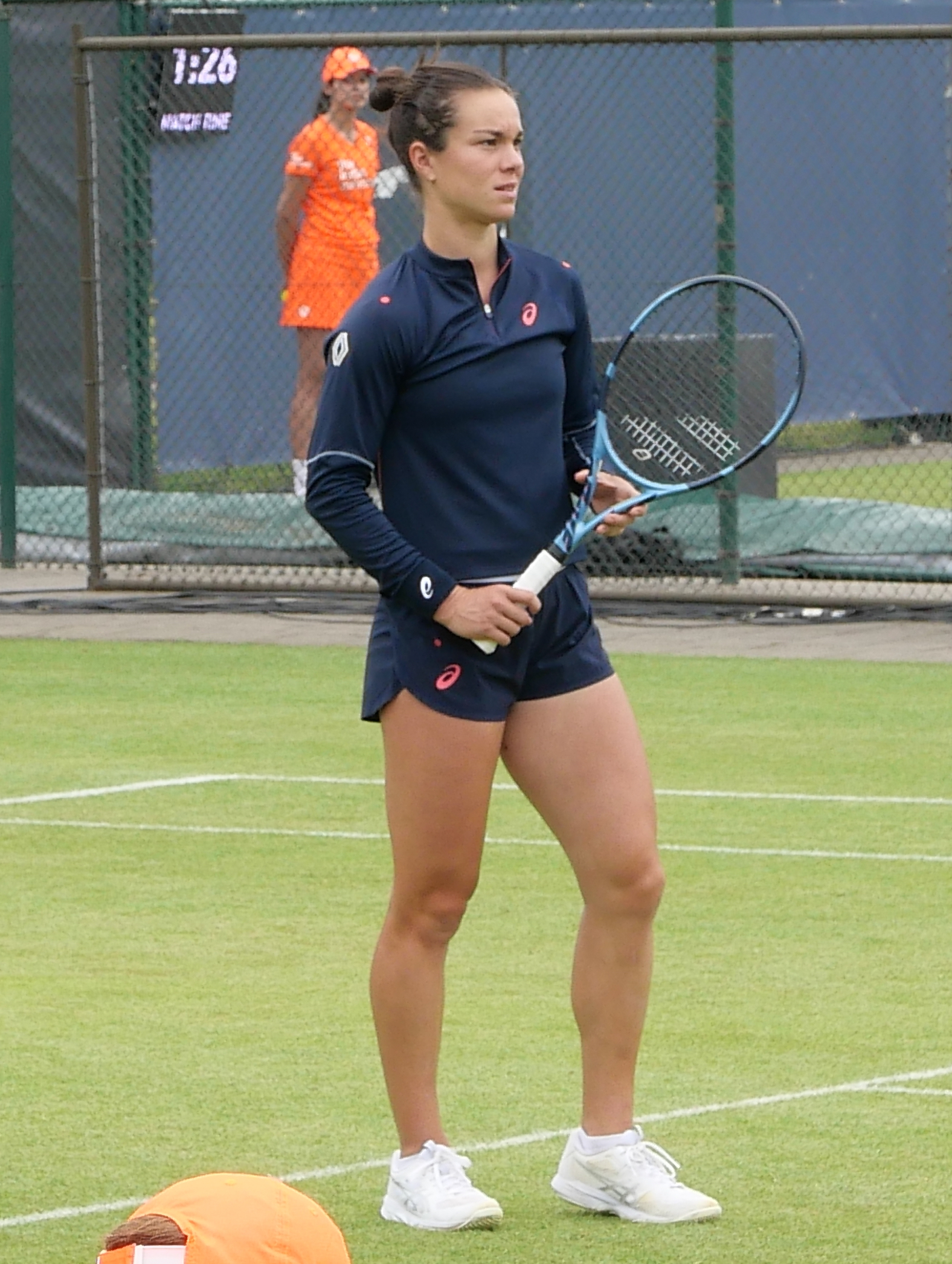
Boison at the 2026 Libéma Open

Having not played a competitive match since September 2025 due to a series of injuries and medical issues, Boisson made her return to the WTA Tour in April at the Madrid Open, losing in the first round to Peyton Stearns in straight sets.

Boisson then lost her opening round match at the French Open to Anna Kalinskaya. Having failed to defend any of her semifinalist points from the previous year, she dropped over 100 spots out of the top 150 after the tournament. In June, Boisson made her Wimbledon main-draw debut, losing in the first round to world No. 2 Elena Rybakina in three sets. That August, she lost to Emma Navarro in the first round of the US Open, smashing her tennis racket against the court during the victor's post-match celebration.

== Coaching ==
In December 2025, Boisson officially hired Carlos Martinez as her coach after a trial period, that started during the Asian hardcourt swing.

== Performance timeline ==
Key
W	F	SF	QF	#R	RR	Q#	DNQ	A	NH

(W) winner; (F) finalist; (SF) semifinalist; (QF) quarterfinalist; (#R) rounds 4, 3, 2, 1; (RR) round-robin stage; (Q#) qualification round; (DNQ) did not qualify; (A) absent; (NH) not held; (SR) strike rate (events won / competed); (W–L) win–loss record.
To avoid confusion and double counting, these charts are updated at the conclusion of a tournament or when the player's participation has ended.

=== Singles ===
Current through the 2026 Madrid Open.

Tournament	2021	2022	2023	2024	2025	2026	SR	W–L	Win%
Grand Slam tournaments
Australian Open	A	A	A	A	A	A	0 / 0	0–0	–
French Open	Q2	Q1	Q1	A	SF	1R	0 / 2	5–2	71%
Wimbledon	A	A	A	A	Q1	1R	0 / 1	0–1	0%
US Open	A	A	A	A	1R	1R	0 / 2	0–2	0%
Win–loss	0–0	0–0	0–0	0–0	5–2	0–3	0 / 5	5–5	50%
National representation
Summer Olympics	DNQ	NH		DNQ	NH		0 / 0	0–0	–
Billie Jean King Cup	A (Note: Edition is split into the two years due to COVID-19.)	A	A	A	A		0 / 0	0–0	–
WTA 1000
Qatar Open (Note: The first Premier 5 event of the year has switched back and forth between the Dubai Tennis Championships and the Qatar Ladies Open since 2009 until 2024. Dubai was classified as a Premier 5 event from 2009 to 2011 before being succeeded by Doha for the 2012–2014 period. In 2015, Dubai regained its Premier 5 status while Doha was demoted to Premier status. The Premier 5 tournaments were reclassified as WTA 1000 tournaments in 2021.)	NTI	A	NTI	A	A	A	0 / 0	0–0	–
Dubai	A	NTI	A	A	A	A	0 / 0	0–0	–
Indian Wells	A	A	A	A	A	A	0 / 0	0–0	–
Miami Open	A	A	A	A	A	A	0 / 0	0–0	–
Madrid Open	A	A	A	A	A	1R	0 / 1	0–1	0%
Italian Open	A	A	A	A	A		0 / 0	0–0	–
Canadian Open	A	A	A	A	A		0 / 0	0–0	–
Cincinnati Open	A	A	A	A	A		0 / 0	0–0	–
Guadalajara Open	NH	A	A	NTI			0 / 0	0–0	–
China Open	NH		A	A	3R		0 / 1	2–1	67%
Wuhan Open	NH			A	A		0 / 0	0–0	–
Career statistics
Tournaments	0	0	0	0	5	1	Total: 6		
Win–loss	0–0	0–0	0–0	0–0	13–5	0–1	1 / 6	13–6	68%

== WTA Tour finals ==
=== Singles: 1 (title) ===
Legend WTA 500 WTA 250 (1–0)	Finals by surface Clay (1–0)	Finals by setting Outdoor (1–0)

Result	W–L	Date	Tournament	Tier	Surface	Opponent	Score
Win	1–0	Jul 2025	Hamburg European Open, Germany	WTA 250	Clay	(Hungary) Anna Bondár	7–5, 6–3

== WTA 125 finals ==
=== Singles: 2 (1 title, 1 runner-up) ===
Result	W–L	Date	Tournament	Surface	Opponent	Score
Win	1–0	May 2024	Open de Saint-Malo, France	Clay	(France) Chloé Paquet	4–6, 7–6^{(7–3)}, 6–3
Loss	1–1	Oct 2026	Adana Open, Turkey	Hard	(France) Léolia Jeanjean	6–7^{(3–7)}, 6–4, 4–6

== ITF Circuit finals ==
=== Singles: 8 (6 titles, 2 runner-ups) ===
Legend W75 tournaments (2–0) W25/35 tournaments (2–2) W15 tournaments (2–0)	Finals by surface Clay (6–2) Hard (0–0)

Result	W–L	Date	Tournament	Tier	Surface	Opponent	Score
Win	1–0	Sep 2022	ITF Dijon, France	W15	Clay	(United States) Vivian Wolff	7–5, 3–6, 7–5
Win	2–0	Mar 2023	ITF Le Havre, France	W15	Clay (i)	(France) Diana Martynov	6–0, 4–6, 6–2
Loss	2–1	Oct 2023	ITF Seville, Spain	W25	Clay	(Czech Republic) Dominika Šalková	4–6, 3–6
Win	3–1	Mar 2024	ITF Alaminos, Cyprus	W35	Clay	(Greece) Despina Papamichail	6–2, 6–0
Win	4–1	Mar 2024	ITF Terrassa, Spain	W35	Clay	(Belgium) Hanne Vandewinkel	6–0, 7–6^{(8)}
Win	5–1	Mar 2024	Bellinzona Ladies Open, Switzerland	W75	Clay	(Hungary) Anna Bondár	6–3, 2–6, 6–4
Loss	5–2	Mar 2025	ITF Terrassa, Spain	W35	Clay	(Austria) Lilli Tagger	6–7^{(4)}, 3–6
Win	6–2	May 2025	Open Saint-Gaudens, France	W75	Clay	Tatiana Prozorova	7–6^{(4)}, 6–0

== Wins against top 10 players ==
- Boisson has a 2–1 record against players who were, at the time the match was played, ranked in the top 10.

Season	2025	Total
Wins	2	2

#	Opponent	Rk	Event	Surface	Rd	Score	LBR
2025
1.	(United States) Jessica Pegula	3	French Open	Clay	4R	3–6, 6–4, 6–4	361
2.	Mirra Andreeva	6	French Open	Clay	QF	7–6^{(8–6)}, 6–3	361

*As of 4 June 2025
