= 2025 Coco Gauff tennis season =

Tennis season statistics

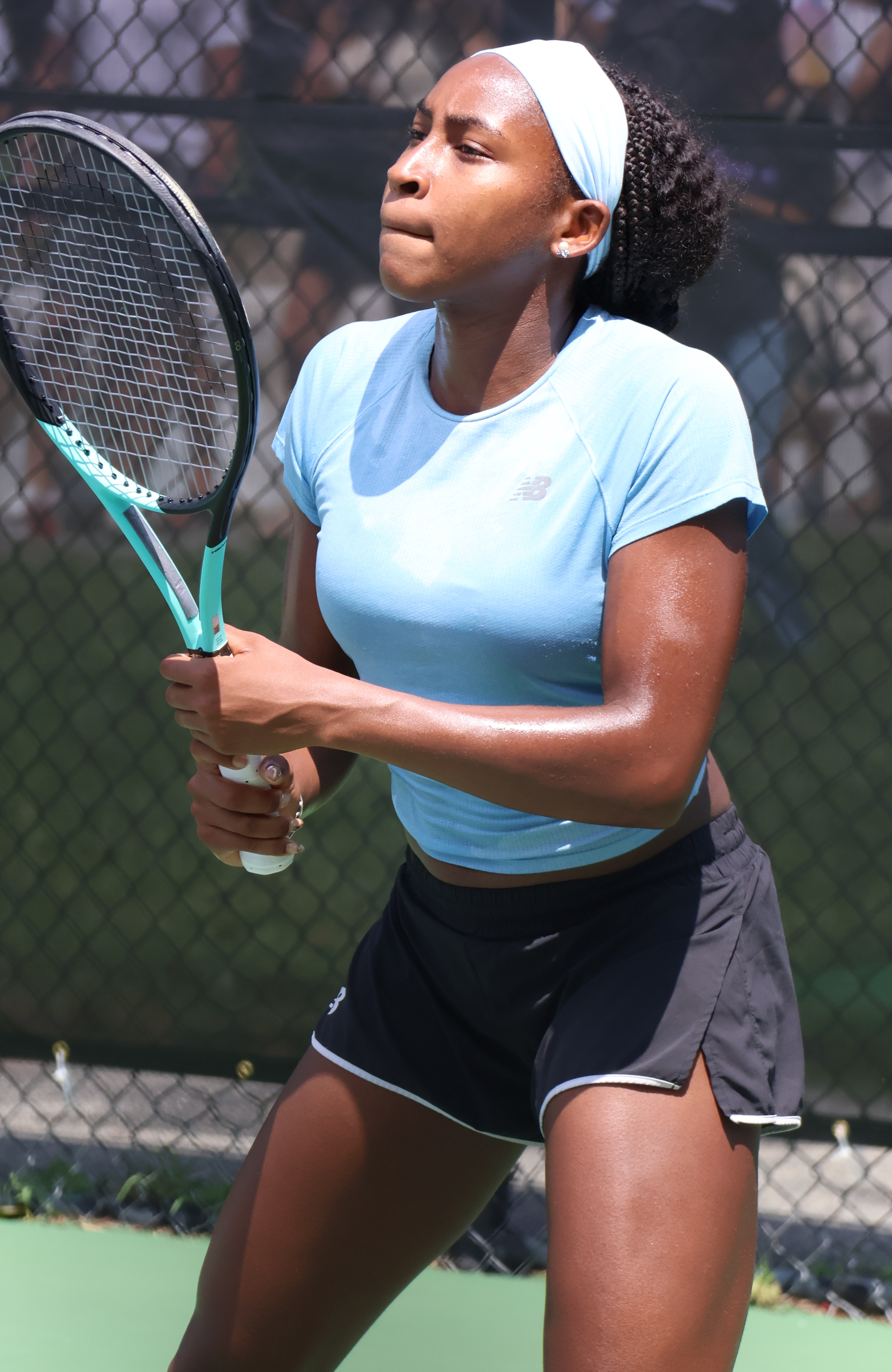
- Gauff at the 2023 Washington Open
- Full name: Cori Dionne "Coco" Gauff
- Country: United States
- Calendar prize money: $6,346,685

Singles
- Season record: 48–16 (75%)
- Calendar titles: 2
- Year-end ranking: No. 3
- Ranking change from previous year: Steady

Grand Slam & significant results
- Australian Open: QF
- French Open: W
- Wimbledon: 1R
- US Open: 4R
- Championships: RR

Doubles
- Season record: 9–2 (82%)
- Calendar titles: 1
- Current ranking: No. 59
- Ranking change from previous year: ▼43

Grand Slam doubles results
- Australian Open: A
- French Open: A
- Wimbledon: A
- US Open: A

Mixed doubles
- Season record: 2–0
- Last updated on: September 15, 2025.

The 2025 Coco Gauff tennis season officially began on December 27, 2024, with the start of the United Cup in Perth.

== All matches ==
This table chronicles all the matches of Coco Gauff in 2025.

Key
W	F	SF	QF	#R	RR	Q#	P#	DNQ	A	Z#	PO	G	S	B	NMS	NTI	P	NH

(W) winner; (F) finalist; (SF) semifinalist; (QF) quarterfinalist; (#R) rounds 4, 3, 2, 1; (RR) round-robin stage; (Q#) qualification round; (P#) preliminary round; (DNQ) did not qualify; (A) absent; (Z#) Davis/Fed Cup Zonal Group (with number indication) or (PO) play-off; (G) gold, (S) silver or (B) bronze Olympic/Paralympic medal; (NMS) not a Masters tournament; (NTI) not a Tier I tournament; (P) postponed; (NH) not held; (SR) strike rate (events won / competed); (W–L) win–loss record.
To avoid confusion and double counting, these charts are updated at the conclusion of a tournament or when the player's participation has ended.

=== Singles matches ===
Tournament	Match	Round	Opponent	Rank	Result	Score
United Cup; Perth/Sydney, Australia; WTA 500; Hard, outdoor; December 27, 2024 – January 5, 2025	1	RR	(Canada) Leylah Fernandez	31	Win	6–3, 6–2
United Cup; Perth/Sydney, Australia; WTA 500; Hard, outdoor; December 27, 2024 – January 5, 2025	2	RR	(Croatia) Donna Vekić	19	Win	6–4, 6–2
United Cup; Perth/Sydney, Australia; WTA 500; Hard, outdoor; December 27, 2024 – January 5, 2025	3	QF	(China) Zhang Shuai	206	Win	7–6^{(7–4)}, 6–2
United Cup; Perth/Sydney, Australia; WTA 500; Hard, outdoor; December 27, 2024 – January 5, 2025	4	SF	(Czech Republic) Karolína Muchová	22	Win	6–1, 6–4
United Cup; Perth/Sydney, Australia; WTA 500; Hard, outdoor; December 27, 2024 – January 5, 2025	5	F	(Poland) Iga Świątek	2	Win	6–4, 6–4
Australian Open; Melbourne, Australia; Grand Slam; Hard, outdoor; January 12, 2025 – January 26, 2025	6	1R	(United States) Sofia Kenin	74	Win	6–3, 6–3
Australian Open; Melbourne, Australia; Grand Slam; Hard, outdoor; January 12, 2025 – January 26, 2025	7	2R	(United Kingdom) Jodie Burrage (PR)	173	Win	6–3, 7–5
Australian Open; Melbourne, Australia; Grand Slam; Hard, outdoor; January 12, 2025 – January 26, 2025	8	3R	(Canada) Leylah Fernandez (30)	29	Win	6–4, 6–2
Australian Open; Melbourne, Australia; Grand Slam; Hard, outdoor; January 12, 2025 – January 26, 2025	9	4R	(Switzerland) Belinda Bencic (PR)	294	Win	5–7, 6–2, 6–1
Australian Open; Melbourne, Australia; Grand Slam; Hard, outdoor; January 12, 2025 – January 26, 2025	10	QF	(Spain) Paula Badosa (PR)	12	Loss	5–7, 4–6
Qatar Open; Doha, Qatar; WTA 1000; Hard, outdoor; February 9, 2025 – February 15, 2025	–	1R	Bye			
Qatar Open; Doha, Qatar; WTA 1000; Hard, outdoor; February 9, 2025 – February 15, 2025	11	2R	(Ukraine) Marta Kostyuk	21	Loss	2–6, 5–7
Dubai Tennis Championships; Dubai, United Arab Emirates; WTA 1000; Hard, outdoor; February 16, 2025 – February 22, 2025	–	1R	Bye			
Dubai Tennis Championships; Dubai, United Arab Emirates; WTA 1000; Hard, outdoor; February 16, 2025 – February 22, 2025	12	2R	(United States) McCartney Kessler	53	Loss	4–6, 5–7
Indian Wells Open; Indian Wells, United States; WTA 1000; Hard, outdoor; March 5, 2025 – March 16, 2025	–	1R	Bye			
Indian Wells Open; Indian Wells, United States; WTA 1000; Hard, outdoor; March 5, 2025 – March 16, 2025	13	2R	(Japan) Moyuka Uchijima	52	Win	6–4, 3–6, 7–6^{(7–4)}
Indian Wells Open; Indian Wells, United States; WTA 1000; Hard, outdoor; March 5, 2025 – March 16, 2025	14	3R	(Greece) Maria Sakkari (29)	29	Win	7–6^{(7–1)}, 6–2
Indian Wells Open; Indian Wells, United States; WTA 1000; Hard, outdoor; March 5, 2025 – March 16, 2025	15	4R	(Switzerland) Belinda Bencic (WC)	58	Loss	6–3, 3–6, 4–6
Miami Open; Miami Gardens, United States; WTA 1000; Hard, outdoor; March 18, 2025 – March 30, 2025	–	1R	Bye			
Miami Open; Miami Gardens, United States; WTA 1000; Hard, outdoor; March 18, 2025 – March 30, 2025	16	2R	(United States) Sofia Kenin	46	Win	6–0, 6–0
Miami Open; Miami Gardens, United States; WTA 1000; Hard, outdoor; March 18, 2025 – March 30, 2025	17	3R	(Greece) Maria Sakkari (28)	51	Win	6–2, 6–4
Miami Open; Miami Gardens, United States; WTA 1000; Hard, outdoor; March 18, 2025 – March 30, 2025	18	4R	(Poland) Magda Linette	34	Loss	4–6, 4–6
Stuttgart Open; Stuttgart, Germany; WTA 500; Clay, indoor; April 14, 2025 – April 21, 2025	–	1R	Bye			
Stuttgart Open; Stuttgart, Germany; WTA 500; Clay, indoor; April 14, 2025 – April 21, 2025	19	2R	(Germany) Ella Seidel (LL)	124	Win	6–1, 6–1
Stuttgart Open; Stuttgart, Germany; WTA 500; Clay, indoor; April 14, 2025 – April 21, 2025	20	QF	(Italy) Jasmine Paolini (5)	6	Loss	4–6, 3–6
Madrid Open; Madrid, Spain; WTA 1000; Clay, outdoor; April 22, 2025 – May 4, 2025	–	1R	Bye			
Madrid Open; Madrid, Spain; WTA 1000; Clay, outdoor; April 22, 2025 – May 4, 2025	21	2R	(Ukraine) Dayana Yastremska	46	Win	0–6, 6–2, 7–5
Madrid Open; Madrid, Spain; WTA 1000; Clay, outdoor; April 22, 2025 – May 4, 2025	22	3R	(United States) Ann Li	62	Win	6–2, 6–3
Madrid Open; Madrid, Spain; WTA 1000; Clay, outdoor; April 22, 2025 – May 4, 2025	23	4R	(Switzerland) Belinda Bencic	42	Win	6–4, 6–2
Madrid Open; Madrid, Spain; WTA 1000; Clay, outdoor; April 22, 2025 – May 4, 2025	24	QF	Mirra Andreeva (Note: Russian and Belarus players are not allowed to compete under the name or flag of their country following the Russian invasion of Ukraine.) (7)	7	Win	7–5, 6–1
Madrid Open; Madrid, Spain; WTA 1000; Clay, outdoor; April 22, 2025 – May 4, 2025	25	SF	(Poland) Iga Świątek (2)	2	Win	6–1, 6–1
Madrid Open; Madrid, Spain; WTA 1000; Clay, outdoor; April 22, 2025 – May 4, 2025	26	F	Aryna Sabalenka (1)	1	Loss	3–6, 6–7^{(3–7)}
Italian Open; Rome, Italy; WTA 1000; Clay, outdoor; May 6, 2025 – May 18, 2025	–	1R	Bye			
Italian Open; Rome, Italy; WTA 1000; Clay, outdoor; May 6, 2025 – May 18, 2025	27	2R	(Canada) Victoria Mboko (Q)	156	Win	3–6, 6–2, 6–1
Italian Open; Rome, Italy; WTA 1000; Clay, outdoor; May 6, 2025 – May 18, 2025	28	3R	(Poland) Magda Linette (32)	32	Win	7–5, 6–3
Italian Open; Rome, Italy; WTA 1000; Clay, outdoor; May 6, 2025 – May 18, 2025	29	4R	(United Kingdom) Emma Raducanu	49	Win	6–1, 6–2
Italian Open; Rome, Italy; WTA 1000; Clay, outdoor; May 6, 2025 – May 18, 2025	30	QF	Mirra Andreeva (7)	7	Win	6–4, 7–6^{(7–5)}
Italian Open; Rome, Italy; WTA 1000; Clay, outdoor; May 6, 2025 – May 18, 2025	31	SF	(China) Zheng Qinwen (8)	8	Win	7–6^{(7–3)}, 4–6, 7–6^{(7–4)}
Italian Open; Rome, Italy; WTA 1000; Clay, outdoor; May 6, 2025 – May 18, 2025	32	F	(Italy) Jasmine Paolini (6)	5	Loss	4–6, 2–6
French Open; Paris, France; Grand Slam; Clay, outdoor; May 25, 2025 – June 8, 2025	33	1R	(Australia) Olivia Gadecki	91	Win	6–2, 6–2
French Open; Paris, France; Grand Slam; Clay, outdoor; May 25, 2025 – June 8, 2025	34	2R	(Czech Republic) Tereza Valentová (Q)	172	Win	6–2, 6–4
French Open; Paris, France; Grand Slam; Clay, outdoor; May 25, 2025 – June 8, 2025	35	3R	(Czech Republic) Marie Bouzková	47	Win	6–1, 7–6^{(7–3)}
French Open; Paris, France; Grand Slam; Clay, outdoor; May 25, 2025 – June 8, 2025	36	4R	Ekaterina Alexandrova (20)	20	Win	6–0, 7–5
French Open; Paris, France; Grand Slam; Clay, outdoor; May 25, 2025 – June 8, 2025	37	QF	(United States) Madison Keys (7)	8	Win	6–7^{(6–8)}, 6–4, 6–1
French Open; Paris, France; Grand Slam; Clay, outdoor; May 25, 2025 – June 8, 2025	38	SF	(France) Loïs Boisson (WC)	361	Win	6–1, 6–2
French Open; Paris, France; Grand Slam; Clay, outdoor; May 25, 2025 – June 8, 2025	39	W	Aryna Sabalenka (1)	1	Win (1)	6–7^{(5–7)}, 6–2, 6–4
Berlin Tennis Open; Berlin, Germany; WTA 500; Grass, outdoor; June 16, 2025 – June 22, 2025	–	1R	Bye			
Berlin Tennis Open; Berlin, Germany; WTA 500; Grass, outdoor; June 16, 2025 – June 22, 2025	40	2R	(China) Wang Xinyu (Q)	49	Loss	3–6, 3–6
Wimbledon; London, United Kingdom; Grand Slam; Grass, outdoor; June 30, 2025 – July 13, 2025	41	1R	(Ukraine) Dayana Yastremska	42	Loss	6–7^{(3–7)}, 1–6
Canadian Open; Montreal, Canada; WTA 1000; Hard, outdoor; July 27, 2025 – August 7, 2025	–	1R	Bye			
Canadian Open; Montreal, Canada; WTA 1000; Hard, outdoor; July 27, 2025 – August 7, 2025	42	2R	(United States) Danielle Collins	61	Win	7–5, 4–6, 7–6^{(7–2)}
Canadian Open; Montreal, Canada; WTA 1000; Hard, outdoor; July 27, 2025 – August 7, 2025	43	3R	Veronika Kudermetova	42	Win	4–6, 7–5, 6–2
Canadian Open; Montreal, Canada; WTA 1000; Hard, outdoor; July 27, 2025 – August 7, 2025	44	4R	(Canada) Victoria Mboko (WC)	85	Loss	1–6, 4–6
Cincinnati Open; Mason, United States; WTA 1000; Hard, outdoor; August 7, 2025 – August 18, 2025	–	1R	Bye			
Cincinnati Open; Mason, United States; WTA 1000; Hard, outdoor; August 7, 2025 – August 18, 2025	45	2R	(China) Wang Xinyu	37	Win	6–3, 6–2
Cincinnati Open; Mason, United States; WTA 1000; Hard, outdoor; August 7, 2025 – August 18, 2025	–	3R	(Ukraine) Dayana Yastremska (32)	31	Walkover	—N/a
Cincinnati Open; Mason, United States; WTA 1000; Hard, outdoor; August 7, 2025 – August 18, 2025	46	4R	(Italy) Lucia Bronzetti	61	Win	6–2, 6–4
Cincinnati Open; Mason, United States; WTA 1000; Hard, outdoor; August 7, 2025 – August 18, 2025	47	QF	(Italy) Jasmine Paolini (7)	9	Loss	6–2, 4–6, 3–6
US Open; New York City, United States; Grand Slam; Hard, outdoor; August 24, 2025 – September 7, 2025	48	1R	(Australia) Ajla Tomljanović	79	Win	6–4, 6–7^{(2–7)}, 7–5
US Open; New York City, United States; Grand Slam; Hard, outdoor; August 24, 2025 – September 7, 2025	49	2R	(Croatia) Donna Vekić	49	Win	7–6^{(7–5)}, 6–2
US Open; New York City, United States; Grand Slam; Hard, outdoor; August 24, 2025 – September 7, 2025	50	3R	(Poland) Magdalena Fręch (28)	33	Win	6–3, 6–1
US Open; New York City, United States; Grand Slam; Hard, outdoor; August 24, 2025 – September 7, 2025	51	4R	(Japan) Naomi Osaka (23)	24	Loss	3–6, 2–6
China Open; Beijing, China; WTA 1000; Hard, outdoor; September 24, 2025 – October 5, 2025	–	1R	Bye			
China Open; Beijing, China; WTA 1000; Hard, outdoor; September 24, 2025 – October 5, 2025	52	2R	Kamilla Rakhimova	89	Win	6–4, 6–0
China Open; Beijing, China; WTA 1000; Hard, outdoor; September 24, 2025 – October 5, 2025	53	3R	(Canada) Leylah Fernandez (25)	25	Win	6–4, 4–6, 7–5
China Open; Beijing, China; WTA 1000; Hard, outdoor; September 24, 2025 – October 5, 2025	54	4R	(Switzerland) Belinda Bencic (15)	16	Win	4–6, 7–6^{(7–4)}, 6–2
China Open; Beijing, China; WTA 1000; Hard, outdoor; September 24, 2025 – October 5, 2025	55	QF	(Germany) Eva Lys	66	Win	6–3, 6–4
China Open; Beijing, China; WTA 1000; Hard, outdoor; September 24, 2025 – October 5, 2025	56	SF	(United States) Amanda Anisimova (3)	4	Loss	1–6, 2–6
Wuhan Open; Wuhan, China; WTA 1000; Hard, outdoor; October 6, 2025 – October 12, 2025	–	1R	Bye			
Wuhan Open; Wuhan, China; WTA 1000; Hard, outdoor; October 6, 2025 – October 12, 2025	57	2R	(Japan) Moyuka Uchijima (Q)	91	Win	6–1, 6–0
Wuhan Open; Wuhan, China; WTA 1000; Hard, outdoor; October 6, 2025 – October 12, 2025	58	3R	(China) Zhang Shuai (WC)	142	Win	6–3, 6–2
Wuhan Open; Wuhan, China; WTA 1000; Hard, outdoor; October 6, 2025 – October 12, 2025	59	QF	(Germany) Laura Siegemund	57	Win	6–3, 6–0
Wuhan Open; Wuhan, China; WTA 1000; Hard, outdoor; October 6, 2025 – October 12, 2025	60	SF	(Italy) Jasmine Paolini (7)	8	Win	6–4, 6–3
Wuhan Open; Wuhan, China; WTA 1000; Hard, outdoor; October 6, 2025 – October 12, 2025	61	W	(United States) Jessica Pegula (6)	6	Win (2)	6–4, 7–5
WTA Finals; Riyadh, Saudi Arabia; Year-end championships; Hard, indoor; November 1, 2025 – November 8, 2025	62	RR	(United States) Jessica Pegula (5)	5	Loss	3–6, 7–6^{(7–4)}, 2–6
WTA Finals; Riyadh, Saudi Arabia; Year-end championships; Hard, indoor; November 1, 2025 – November 8, 2025	63	RR	(Italy) Jasmine Paolini (8)	8	Win	6–3, 6–2
WTA Finals; Riyadh, Saudi Arabia; Year-end championships; Hard, indoor; November 1, 2025 – November 8, 2025	64	RR	Aryna Sabalenka (1)	1	Loss	6–7^{(5–7)}, 2–6

=== Doubles matches ===
Tournament	Match	Round	Opponent	Rank	Result	Score
Madrid Open; Madrid, Spain; WTA 1000; Clay, outdoor; April 22, 2025 – May 4, 2025; Partner: (United States) Robin Montgomery	1	1R	(United States) Caroline Dolehide / (United States) Desirae Krawczyk (4)	14 / 12	Win	6–3, 6–0
Madrid Open; Madrid, Spain; WTA 1000; Clay, outdoor; April 22, 2025 – May 4, 2025; Partner: (United States) Robin Montgomery	2	2R	(Australia) Storm Hunter / (Australia) Ellen Perez (PR)	334 / 20	Win	6–4, 6–3
Madrid Open; Madrid, Spain; WTA 1000; Clay, outdoor; April 22, 2025 – May 4, 2025; Partner: (United States) Robin Montgomery	3	QF	Victoria Azarenka / (United States) Ashlyn Krueger (WC)	554 / 112	Loss	6–7^{(5–7)}, 3–6
Italian Open; Rome, Italy; WTA 1000; Clay, outdoor; May 6, 2025 – May 18, 2025; Partner: (Philippines) Alexandra Eala	4	1R	Alexandra Panova / (Hungary) Fanny Stollár	26 / 50	Win	6–3, 6–1
Italian Open; Rome, Italy; WTA 1000; Clay, outdoor; May 6, 2025 – May 18, 2025; Partner: (Philippines) Alexandra Eala	5	2R	(Italy) Tyra Caterina Grant / (Italy) Lisa Pigato (WC)	526 / 845	Win	6–2, 6–3
Italian Open; Rome, Italy; WTA 1000; Clay, outdoor; May 6, 2025 – May 18, 2025; Partner: (Philippines) Alexandra Eala	6	QF	(Italy) Sara Errani / (Italy) Jasmine Paolini (3)	6 / 6	Loss	5–7, 6–3, [7–10]
Canadian Open; Montreal, Canada; WTA 1000; Hard, outdoor; July 27, 2025 – August 7, 2025; Partner: (United States) McCartney Kessler	7	1R	(Hungary) Fanny Stollár / (Chinese Taipei) Wu Fang-hsien	43 / 28	Win	7–6^{(8–6)}, 6–4
Canadian Open; Montreal, Canada; WTA 1000; Hard, outdoor; July 27, 2025 – August 7, 2025; Partner: (United States) McCartney Kessler	8	2R	(Ukraine) Lyudmyla Kichenok / (Australia) Ellen Perez (7)	16 / 19	Win	6–3, 4–6, [10–1]
Canadian Open; Montreal, Canada; WTA 1000; Hard, outdoor; July 27, 2025 – August 7, 2025; Partner: (United States) McCartney Kessler	9	QF	(Czech Republic) Barbora Krejčíková / (Latvia) Jeļena Ostapenko (PR)	153 / 3	Win	6–4, 3–6, [10–7]
Canadian Open; Montreal, Canada; WTA 1000; Hard, outdoor; July 27, 2025 – August 7, 2025; Partner: (United States) McCartney Kessler	10	SF	(Serbia) Olga Danilović / (Chinese Taipei) Hsieh Su-wei	179 / 13	Win	5–7, 6–4, [10–6]
Canadian Open; Montreal, Canada; WTA 1000; Hard, outdoor; July 27, 2025 – August 7, 2025; Partner: (United States) McCartney Kessler	11	W	(United States) Taylor Townsend / (China) Zhang Shuai (3)	1 / 12	Win (1)	6–4, 1–6, [13–11]

=== Mixed doubles matches ===
Tournament	Match	Round	Opponent	Result	Score
United Cup; Perth/Sydney, Australia; United Cup; Hard, outdoor; December 27, 2024 – January 5, 2025; Partner: (United States) Taylor Fritz	1	RR	(Canada) Félix Auger-Aliassime / (Canada) Leylah Fernandez	Win	7–6^{(7–2)}, 7–5
United Cup; Perth/Sydney, Australia; United Cup; Hard, outdoor; December 27, 2024 – January 5, 2025; Partner: (United States) Taylor Fritz	2	RR	(Croatia) Ivan Dodig / (Croatia) Petra Marčinko	Win	6–2, 6–3
United Cup; Perth/Sydney, Australia; United Cup; Hard, outdoor; December 27, 2024 – January 5, 2025; Partner: (United States) Taylor Fritz	–	QF	(China) Sun Fajing / (China) Zhang Shuai	Withdrew	—N/a
United Cup; Perth/Sydney, Australia; United Cup; Hard, outdoor; December 27, 2024 – January 5, 2025; Partner: (United States) Taylor Fritz	–	SF	(Czech Republic) Tomáš Macháč / (Czech Republic) Karolína Muchová	Withdrew	—N/a
United Cup; Perth/Sydney, Australia; United Cup; Hard, outdoor; December 27, 2024 – January 5, 2025; Partner: (United States) Taylor Fritz	–	F	(Poland) Hubert Hurkacz / (Poland) Iga Świątek	Withdrew	—N/a

== Tournament schedule ==
Key
W	F	SF	QF	#R	RR

(W) winner; (F) finalist; (SF) semifinalist; (QF) quarterfinalist; (#R) rounds 4, 3, 2, 1; (RR) round-robin stage.

=== Singles schedule ===
Date	Tournament	Location	Category	Surface	Prev. result	Prev. points	New points	Outcome
December 27, 2024 – January 5, 2025	United Cup*	Australia	WTA 500	Hard	A	0	500	Winner defeated (Poland) Iga Świątek; 6–4, 6–4
January 12, 2025– January 26, 2025	Australian Open	Australia	Grand Slam	Hard	SF	780	430	Quarterfinals lost to (Spain) Paula Badosa; 5–7, 4–6
February 9, 2025– February 15, 2025	Qatar Open	Qatar	WTA 1000	Hard	2R	10	10	Second round lost to (Ukraine) Marta Kostyuk; 2–6, 5–7
February 16, 2025– February 22, 2025	Dubai Tennis Championships	UAE	WTA 1000	Hard	QF	215	10	Second round lost to (United States) McCartney Kessler; 4–6, 5–7
March 5, 2025 – March 16, 2025	Indian Wells Open	United States	WTA 1000	Hard	SF	390	120	Fourth round lost to (Switzerland) Belinda Bencic; 6–3, 3–6, 4–6
March 18, 2025 – March 30, 2025	Miami Open	United States	WTA 1000	Hard	4R	120	120	Fourth round lost to (Poland) Magda Linette; 4–6, 4–6
April 14, 2025 – April 21, 2025	Stuttgart Open	Germany	WTA 500	Clay (i)	QF	108	108	Quarterfinal lost to (Italy) Jasmine Paolini; 4–6, 3–6
April 22, 2025 – May 4, 2025	Madrid Open	Spain	WTA 1000	Clay	4R	120	650	Final lost to Aryna Sabalenka; 3–6, 6–7^{(3–7)}
May 6, 2025 – May 18, 2025	Italian Open	Italy	WTA 1000	Clay	SF	390	650	Final lost to (Italy) Jasmine Paolini; 4–6, 2–6
May 25, 2025 – June 8, 2025	French Open	France	Grand Slam	Clay	SF	780	2000	Winner defeated Aryna Sabalenka; 6–7^{(5–7)}, 6–2, 6–4
June 16, 2025 – June 22, 2025	German Open	Germany	WTA 500	Grass	SF	195	1	Second round lost to (China) Wang Xinyu; 3–6, 3–6
June 30, 2025 – July 13, 2025	Wimbledon Championships	United Kingdom	Grand Slam	Grass	4R	240	10	First round lost to (Ukraine) Dayana Yastremska; 6–7^{(3–7)}, 1–6
July 27, 2025 – August 7, 2025	Canadian Open	Canada	WTA 1000	Hard	3R	120	120	Fourth round lost to (Canada) Victoria Mboko; 1–6, 4–6
August 7, 2025 – August 18, 2025	Cincinnati Open	United States	WTA 1000	Hard	2R	10	215	Quarterfinal lost to (Italy) Jasmine Paolini; 6–2, 4–6, 3–6
August 24, 2025 – September 7, 2025	US Open	United States	Grand Slam	Hard	4R	240	240	Fourth round lost to (Japan) Naomi Osaka; 3–6, 2–6
September 24, 2025 – October 5, 2025	China Open	China	WTA 1000	Hard	W	1000	390	Semifinals lost to (United States) Amanda Anisimova; 1–6, 2–6
October 6, 2025 – October 12, 2025	Wuhan Open	China	WTA 1000	Hard	SF	390	1000	Winner defeated (United States) Jessica Pegula; 6–4, 7–5
November 1, 2025 – November 8, 2025	WTA Finals	Saudi Arabia	WTA Finals	Hard	W	1300	200	Failed to advance into the semifinals 1 win & 2 losses
Total year-end points						6530	6763	▲233 (difference)

- *Denotes tournament does not count as a singles title but points are earned

== Yearly records ==
=== Head-to-head match-ups ===
Gauff has a 48–16 (75%) WTA match win–loss record in the 2025 season. Her record against players who were part of the WTA rankings top ten at the time of their meetings is 10–7 (59%). Bold indicates player was ranked top 10 at the time of at least one meeting. The following list is ordered by number of wins:

- (Canada) Leylah Fernandez 3–0
- (Switzerland) Belinda Bencic 3–1
- **Mirra Andreeva** 2–0
- (United States) Sofia Kenin 2–0
- (Greece) Maria Sakkari 2–0
- **(Poland) Iga Świątek** 2–0
- (Japan) Moyuka Uchijima 2–0
- (Croatia) Donna Vekić 2–0
- (China) Zhang Shuai 2–0
- **(Italy) Jasmine Paolini** 2–3
- Ekaterina Alexandrova 1–0
- (France) Loïs Boisson 1–0
- (Czech Republic) Marie Bouzková 1–0
- (Italy) Lucia Bronzetti 1–0
- (United Kingdom) Jodie Burrage 1–0
- (United States) Danielle Collins 1–0
- (Poland) Magdalena Fręch 1–0
- (Australia) Olivia Gadecki 1–0
- **(United States) Madison Keys** 1–0
- Veronika Kudermetova 1–0
- (United States) Ann Li 1–0
- (Germany) Eva Lys 1–0
- (Czech Republic) Karolína Muchová 1–0
- (United Kingdom) Emma Raducanu 1–0
- Kamilla Rakhimova 1–0
- (Germany) Ella Seidel 1–0
- (Germany) Laura Siegemund 1–0
- (Australia) Ajla Tomljanović 1–0
- (Czech Republic) Tereza Valentová 1–0
- **(China) Zheng Qinwen** 1–0
- (Poland) Magda Linette 1–1
- (Canada) Victoria Mboko 1–1
- **(United States) Jessica Pegula** 1–1
- (China) Wang Xinyu 1–1
- (Ukraine) Dayana Yastremska 1–1
- **Aryna Sabalenka** 1–2
- **(United States) Amanda Anisimova** 0–1
- (Spain) Paula Badosa 0–1
- (Ukraine) Marta Kostyuk 0–1
- (United States) McCartney Kessler 0–1
- (Japan) Naomi Osaka 0–1

=== Top 10 record ===
Result	W–L	Opponent	Rk	Tournament	Surface	Rd	Score	Rk	Ref
Win	1–0	(Poland) Iga Świątek	2	United Cup, Australia	Hard	F	6–4, 6–4	3	
Loss	1–1	(Italy) Jasmine Paolini	6	Stuttgart Open, Germany	Clay (i)	SF	4–6, 3–6	4	
Win	2–1	Mirra Andreeva	7	Madrid Open, Spain	Clay	QF	7–5, 6–1	4	
Win	3–1	(Poland) Iga Świątek	2	Madrid Open, Spain	Clay	SF	6–1, 6–1	4	
Loss	3–2	Aryna Sabalenka	**1**	Madrid Open, Spain	Clay	F	3–6, 6–7^{(3–7)}	4	
Win	4–2	Mirra Andreeva	7	Italian Open, Italy	Clay	QF	6–4, 7–6^{(7–5)}	3	
Win	5–2	(China) Zheng Qinwen	8	Italian Open, Italy	Clay	SF	7–6^{(7–3)}, 4–6, 7–6^{(7–4)}	3	
Loss	5–3	(Italy) Jasmine Paolini	5	Italian Open, Italy	Clay	F	4–6, 2–6	3	
Win	6–3	(United States) Madison Keys	8	French Open, France	Clay	QF	6–7^{(6–8)}, 6–4, 6–1	2	
Win	7–3	Aryna Sabalenka	**1**	French Open, France	Clay	F	6–7^{(5–7)}, 6–2, 6–4	2	
Loss	7–4	(Italy) Jasmine Paolini	9	Cincinnati Open, United States	Hard	QF	6–2, 4–6, 3–6	2	
Loss	7–5	(United States) Amanda Anisimova	4	China Open, China	Hard	SF	1–6, 2–6	3	
Win	8–5	(Italy) Jasmine Paolini	8	Wuhan Open, China	Hard	SF	6–4, 6–3	3	
Win	9–5	(United States) Jessica Pegula	6	Wuhan Open, China	Hard	F	6–4, 7–5	3	
Loss	9–6	(United States) Jessica Pegula	5	WTA Finals, Saudi Arabia	Hard (i)	RR	3–6, 7–6^{(7–4)}, 2–6	3	
Win	10–6	(Italy) Jasmine Paolini	8	WTA Finals, Saudi Arabia	Hard (i)	RR	6–3, 6–2	3	
Loss	10–7	Aryna Sabalenka	**1**	WTA Finals, Saudi Arabia	Hard (i)	RR	6–7^{(5–7)}, 2–6	3	

- Key: (Rk) first use, opponent rank; (Rd) round; (Rk) 2nd use, player rank; (Ref) reference; (F) final; (SF) semifinal; (QF) quarterfinal; (#R) rounds 4, 3, 2, 1; (RR) round-robin stage; (Q#) qualifying rounds or stages (3), 2, 1.

=== Finals ===
==== Singles: 4 (2 titles, 2 runner-ups) ====
Legend Grand Slam (1–0) WTA 1000 (1–2)	Finals by surface Hard (1–0) Clay (1–2)

Result	W–L	Date	Tournament	Tier	Surface	Opponent	Score
Loss	0–1	May 2025	Madrid Open, Spain	WTA 1000	Clay	Aryna Sabalenka	3–6, 6–7^{(3–7)}
Loss	0–2	May 2025	Italian Open, Italy	WTA 1000	Clay	(Italy) Jasmine Paolini	4–6, 2–6
Win	1–2	Jun 2025	French Open, France	Grand Slam	Clay	Aryna Sabalenka	6–7^{(5–7)}, 6–2, 6–4
Win	2–2	Oct 2025	Wuhan Open, China	WTA 1000	Hard	(United States) Jessica Pegula	6–4, 7–5

==== Doubles: 1 (title) ====
Legend WTA 1000 (1–0)	Finals by surface Hard (1–0)

Result	W–L	Date	Tournament	Tier	Surface	Partner	Opponents	Score
Win	1–0	Aug 2025	Canadian Open, Canada	WTA 1000	Hard	(United States) McCartney Kessler	(United States) Taylor Townsend (China) Zhang Shuai	6–4, 1–6, [13–11]

=== Earnings ===
- **Bold** font denotes tournament win

**Singles**
Event	Prize money	Year-to-date
**United Cup**	**$907,000**	$907,000
Australian Open	A$665,000	$1,326,731
Qatar Open	$23,500	$1,350,231
Dubai Tennis Championships	$23,500	$1,373,731
Indian Wells Open	$103,525	$1,477,256
Miami Open	$103,225	$1,580,481
Stuttgart Open	$24,950	$1,605,431
Madrid Open	€523,870	$2,203,321
Italian Open	€512,260	$2,728,561
**French Open**	**€2,550,000**	$5,489,507
German Open	$15,170	$5,504,677
Wimbledon Championships	£66,000	$5,594,142
Canadian Open	$56,703	$5,650,845
Cincinnati Open	$106,900	$5,757,745
US Open	$400,000	$6,157,745
China Open	$332,160	$6,489,905
**Wuhan Open**	**$596,000**	$7,085,905
WTA Finals	$	$
		$7,085,905
**Doubles**
Event	Prize money	Year-to-date
Madrid Open	$32,500	$32,500
Italian Open	$25,050	$57,550
**Canadian Open**	**$131,390**	$188,940
		$188,940
**Total**
		**$7,274,845**

Figures in United States dollars (USD) unless noted.

== See also ==
- 2025 Madison Keys tennis season
- 2025 Aryna Sabalenka tennis season
- 2025 Iga Świątek tennis season
- 2025 Elena Rybakina tennis season
