= 2025 Iga Świątek tennis season =

2025 tennis player season

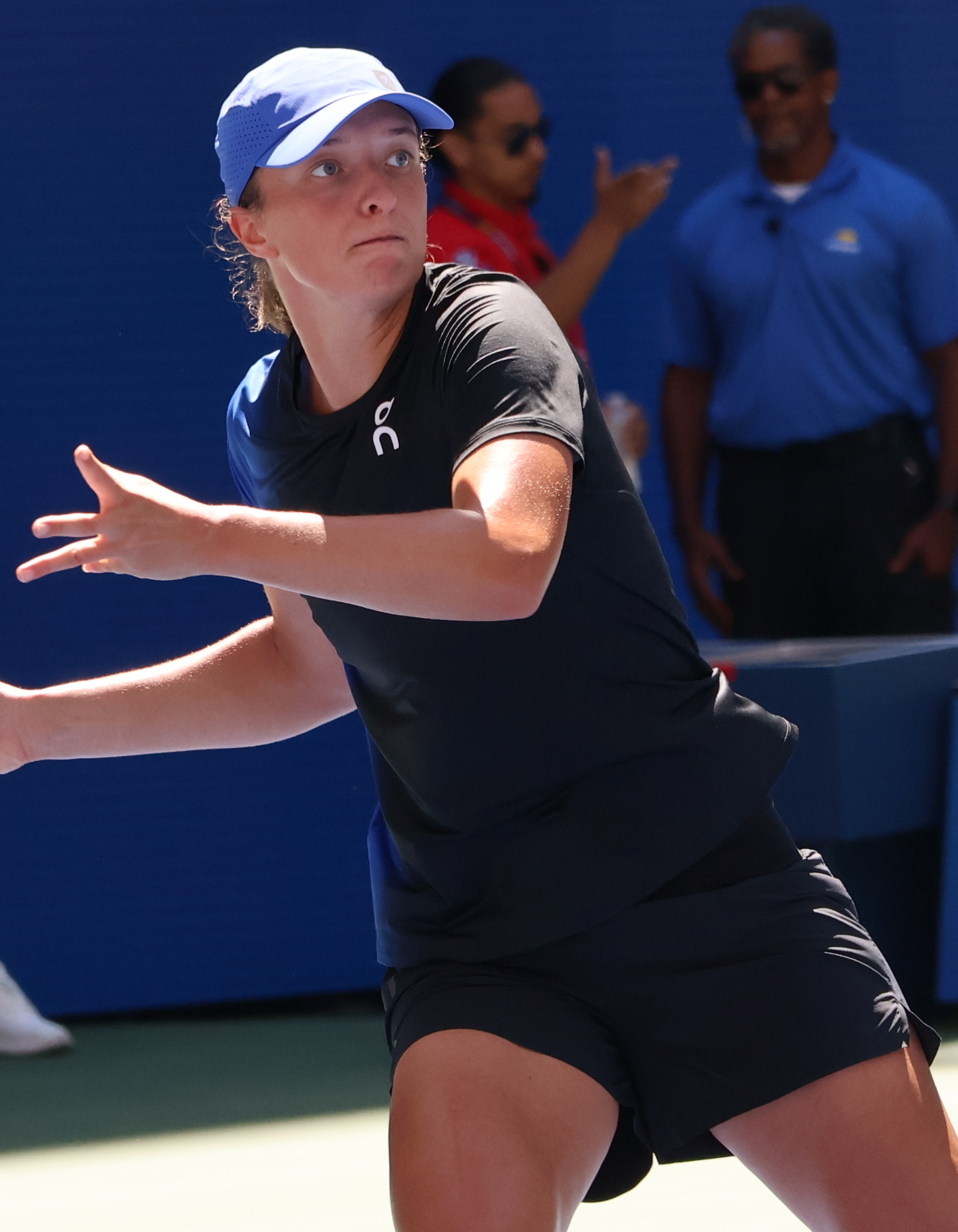
- Swiatek practicing at the 2023 US Open
- Full name: Iga Świątek
- Country: Poland
- Calendar prize money: $10,112,532

Singles
- Season record: 64–17 (79%)
- Calendar titles: 3
- Current ranking: No. 2
- Year-end ranking: No. 2
- Ranking change from previous year: Steady

Grand Slam & significant results
- Australian Open: SF
- French Open: SF
- Wimbledon: W
- US Open: QF
- Championships: RR

Mixed doubles
- Season record: 5–1 (83%)

Grand Slam mixed doubles results
- US Open: F
- Last updated on: 17 November 2025.

The 2025 Iga Świątek tennis season officially began on 30 December 2024 as the start of the 2025 WTA Tour. Iga Świątek entered the season as the world No. 2 player in singles. During the season, she won her first grass title in her career at Wimbledon, which was also her sixth Grand Slam title.

== All matches ==
Key
W	F	SF	QF	#R	RR	Q#	P#	DNQ	A	Z#	PO	G	S	B	NMS	NTI	P	NH

(W) winner; (F) finalist; (SF) semifinalist; (QF) quarterfinalist; (#R) rounds 4, 3, 2, 1; (RR) round-robin stage; (Q#) qualification round; (P#) preliminary round; (DNQ) did not qualify; (A) absent; (Z#) Davis/Fed Cup Zonal Group (with number indication) or (PO) play-off; (G) gold, (S) silver or (B) bronze Olympic/Paralympic medal; (NMS) not a Masters tournament; (NTI) not a Tier I tournament; (P) postponed; (NH) not held; (SR) strike rate (events won / competed); (W–L) win–loss record.
To avoid confusion and double counting, these charts are updated at the conclusion of a tournament or when the player's participation has ended.

=== Singles matches ===
Tournament	Match	Round	Opponent	Rank	Result	Score
United Cup; Perth/Sydney, Australia; United Cup; Hard, outdoor; 27 December 2024 – 5 January 2025	1	RR	(Norway) Malene Helgø	404	Win	6–1, 6–0
United Cup; Perth/Sydney, Australia; United Cup; Hard, outdoor; 27 December 2024 – 5 January 2025	2	RR	(Czech Republic) Karolína Muchová	22	Win	6–3, 6–4
United Cup; Perth/Sydney, Australia; United Cup; Hard, outdoor; 27 December 2024 – 5 January 2025	3	QF	(United Kingdom) Katie Boulter	24	Win	6–7^{(4–7)}, 6–1, 6–4
United Cup; Perth/Sydney, Australia; United Cup; Hard, outdoor; 27 December 2024 – 5 January 2025	4	SF	(Kazakhstan) Elena Rybakina	6	Win	7–6^{(7–5)}, 6–4
United Cup; Perth/Sydney, Australia; United Cup; Hard, outdoor; 27 December 2024 – 5 January 2025	5	F	(United States) Coco Gauff	3	Loss	4–6, 4–6
Australian Open; Melbourne, Australia; Grand Slam; Hard, outdoor; 12 January 2025 – 26 January 2025	6	1R	(Czech Republic) Kateřina Siniaková	50	Win	6–3, 6–4
Australian Open; Melbourne, Australia; Grand Slam; Hard, outdoor; 12 January 2025 – 26 January 2025	7	2R	(Slovakia) Rebecca Šramková	49	Win	6–0, 6–2
Australian Open; Melbourne, Australia; Grand Slam; Hard, outdoor; 12 January 2025 – 26 January 2025	8	3R	(United Kingdom) Emma Raducanu	61	Win	6–1, 6–0
Australian Open; Melbourne, Australia; Grand Slam; Hard, outdoor; 12 January 2025 – 26 January 2025	9	4R	(Germany) Eva Lys (LL)	128	Win	6–0, 6–1
Australian Open; Melbourne, Australia; Grand Slam; Hard, outdoor; 12 January 2025 – 26 January 2025	10	QF	(United States) Emma Navarro (8)	8	Win	6–1, 6–2
Australian Open; Melbourne, Australia; Grand Slam; Hard, outdoor; 12 January 2025 – 26 January 2025	11	SF	(United States) Madison Keys (19)	20	Loss	7–5, 1–6, 6–7^{(8–10)}
Qatar Open; Doha, Qatar; WTA 1000; Hard, outdoor; 9 February 2025 – 15 February 2025	–	1R	Bye			
Qatar Open; Doha, Qatar; WTA 1000; Hard, outdoor; 9 February 2025 – 15 February 2025	12	2R	(Greece) Maria Sakkari	29	Win	6–3, 6–2
Qatar Open; Doha, Qatar; WTA 1000; Hard, outdoor; 9 February 2025 – 15 February 2025	13	3R	(Czech Republic) Linda Nosková	33	Win	6–7^{(1–7)}, 6–4, 6–4
Qatar Open; Doha, Qatar; WTA 1000; Hard, outdoor; 9 February 2025 – 15 February 2025	14	QF	(Kazakhstan) Elena Rybakina (5)	7	Win	6–2, 7–5
Qatar Open; Doha, Qatar; WTA 1000; Hard, outdoor; 9 February 2025 – 15 February 2025	15	SF	(Latvia) Jeļena Ostapenko	37	Loss	3–6, 1–6
Dubai Tennis Championships; Dubai, United Arab Emirates; WTA 1000; Hard, outdoor; 16 February 2025 – 22 February 2025	–	1R	Bye			
Dubai Tennis Championships; Dubai, United Arab Emirates; WTA 1000; Hard, outdoor; 16 February 2025 – 22 February 2025	16	2R	Victoria Azarenka (Note: Russian and Belarus players are not allowed to compete under the name or flag of their country following the Russian invasion of Ukraine.)	34	Win	6–0, 6–2
Dubai Tennis Championships; Dubai, United Arab Emirates; WTA 1000; Hard, outdoor; 16 February 2025 – 22 February 2025	17	3R	(Ukraine) Dayana Yastremska	48	Win	7–5, 6–0
Dubai Tennis Championships; Dubai, United Arab Emirates; WTA 1000; Hard, outdoor; 16 February 2025 – 22 February 2025	18	QF	Mirra Andreeva (12)	14	Loss	3–6, 3–6
Indian Wells Open; Indian Wells, United States; WTA 1000; Hard, outdoor; 5 March 2025 – 16 March 2025	–	1R	Bye			
Indian Wells Open; Indian Wells, United States; WTA 1000; Hard, outdoor; 5 March 2025 – 16 March 2025	19	2R	(France) Caroline Garcia	71	Win	6–2, 6–0
Indian Wells Open; Indian Wells, United States; WTA 1000; Hard, outdoor; 5 March 2025 – 16 March 2025	20	3R	(Ukraine) Dayana Yastremska	46	Win	6–0, 6–2
Indian Wells Open; Indian Wells, United States; WTA 1000; Hard, outdoor; 5 March 2025 – 16 March 2025	21	4R	(Czech Republic) Karolína Muchová (15)	15	Win	6–1, 6–1
Indian Wells Open; Indian Wells, United States; WTA 1000; Hard, outdoor; 5 March 2025 – 16 March 2025	22	QF	(China) Zheng Qinwen (8)	9	Win	6–3, 6–3
Indian Wells Open; Indian Wells, United States; WTA 1000; Hard, outdoor; 5 March 2025 – 16 March 2025	23	SF	Mirra Andreeva (9)	11	Loss	6–7^{(1–7)}, 6–1, 3–6
Miami Open; Miami Gardens, United States; WTA 1000; Hard, outdoor; 18 March 2025 – 30 March 2025	–	1R	Bye			
Miami Open; Miami Gardens, United States; WTA 1000; Hard, outdoor; 18 March 2025 – 30 March 2025	24	2R	(France) Caroline Garcia	74	Win	6–2, 7–5
Miami Open; Miami Gardens, United States; WTA 1000; Hard, outdoor; 18 March 2025 – 30 March 2025	25	3R	(Belgium) Elise Mertens (27)	28	Win	7–6^{(7–2)}, 6–1
Miami Open; Miami Gardens, United States; WTA 1000; Hard, outdoor; 18 March 2025 – 30 March 2025	26	4R	(Ukraine) Elina Svitolina (22)	22	Win	7–6^{(7–5)}, 6–3
Miami Open; Miami Gardens, United States; WTA 1000; Hard, outdoor; 18 March 2025 – 30 March 2025	27	QF	(Philippines) Alexandra Eala (WC)	140	Loss	2–6, 5–7
Stuttgart Open; Stuttgart, Germany; WTA 500; Clay, indoor; 14 April 2025 – 21 April 2025	–	1R	Bye			
Stuttgart Open; Stuttgart, Germany; WTA 500; Clay, indoor; 14 April 2025 – 21 April 2025	28	2R	(Croatia) Jana Fett (Q)	153	Win	6–2, 6–2
Stuttgart Open; Stuttgart, Germany; WTA 500; Clay, indoor; 14 April 2025 – 21 April 2025	29	QF	(Latvia) Jeļena Ostapenko	24	Loss	3–6, 6–3, 2–6
Madrid Open; Madrid, Spain; WTA 1000; Clay, outdoor; 22 April 2025 – 4 May 2025	–	1R	Bye			
Madrid Open; Madrid, Spain; WTA 1000; Clay, outdoor; 22 April 2025 – 4 May 2025	30	2R	(Philippines) Alexandra Eala (WC)	72	Win	4–6, 6–4, 6–2
Madrid Open; Madrid, Spain; WTA 1000; Clay, outdoor; 22 April 2025 – 4 May 2025	31	3R	(Czech Republic) Linda Nosková (31)	31	Win	6–4, 6–2
Madrid Open; Madrid, Spain; WTA 1000; Clay, outdoor; 22 April 2025 – 4 May 2025	32	4R	Diana Shnaider (13)	13	Win	6–0, 6–7^{(3–7)}, 6–4
Madrid Open; Madrid, Spain; WTA 1000; Clay, outdoor; 22 April 2025 – 4 May 2025	33	QF	(United States) Madison Keys (5)	5	Win	0–6, 6–3, 6–2
Madrid Open; Madrid, Spain; WTA 1000; Clay, outdoor; 22 April 2025 – 4 May 2025	34	SF	(United States) Coco Gauff (4)	4	Loss	1–6, 1–6
Italian Open; Rome, Italy; WTA 1000; Clay, outdoor; 6 May 2025 – 18 May 2025	–	1R	Bye			
Italian Open; Rome, Italy; WTA 1000; Clay, outdoor; 6 May 2025 – 18 May 2025	35	2R	(Italy) Elisabetta Cocciaretto (WC)	82	Win	6–1, 6–0
Italian Open; Rome, Italy; WTA 1000; Clay, outdoor; 6 May 2025 – 18 May 2025	36	3R	(United States) Danielle Collins (29)	35	Loss	1–6, 5–7
French Open; Paris, France; Grand Slam; Clay, outdoor; 25 May 2025 – 8 June 2025	37	1R	(Slovakia) Rebecca Šramková	41	Win	6–3, 6–3
French Open; Paris, France; Grand Slam; Clay, outdoor; 25 May 2025 – 8 June 2025	38	2R	(United Kingdom) Emma Raducanu	43	Win	6–1, 6–2
French Open; Paris, France; Grand Slam; Clay, outdoor; 25 May 2025 – 8 June 2025	39	3R	(Romania) Jaqueline Cristian	60	Win	6–2, 7–5
French Open; Paris, France; Grand Slam; Clay, outdoor; 25 May 2025 – 8 June 2025	40	4R	(Kazakhstan) Elena Rybakina (12)	11	Win	1–6, 6–3, 7–5
French Open; Paris, France; Grand Slam; Clay, outdoor; 25 May 2025 – 8 June 2025	41	QF	(Ukraine) Elina Svitolina (13)	14	Win	6–1, 7–5
French Open; Paris, France; Grand Slam; Clay, outdoor; 25 May 2025 – 8 June 2025	42	SF	Aryna Sabalenka (1)	1	Loss	6–7^{(1–7)}, 6–4, 0–6
Bad Homburg Open; Bad Homburg, Germany; WTA 500; Grass, outdoor; 22 June 2025 – 28 June 2025	–	1R	Bye			
Bad Homburg Open; Bad Homburg, Germany; WTA 500; Grass, outdoor; 22 June 2025 – 28 June 2025	43	2R	Victoria Azarenka (Q)	105	Win	6–4, 6–4
Bad Homburg Open; Bad Homburg, Germany; WTA 500; Grass, outdoor; 22 June 2025 – 28 June 2025	44	QF	Ekaterina Alexandrova (8)	18	Win	6–4, 7–6^{(7–5)}
Bad Homburg Open; Bad Homburg, Germany; WTA 500; Grass, outdoor; 22 June 2025 – 28 June 2025	45	SF	(Italy) Jasmine Paolini (2)	4	Win	6–1, 6–3
Bad Homburg Open; Bad Homburg, Germany; WTA 500; Grass, outdoor; 22 June 2025 – 28 June 2025	46	F	(United States) Jessica Pegula (1)	3	Loss	4–6, 5–7
Wimbledon; London, United Kingdom; Grand Slam; Grass, outdoor; 30 June 2025 – 13 July 2025	47	1R	Polina Kudermetova	64	Win	7–5, 6–1
Wimbledon; London, United Kingdom; Grand Slam; Grass, outdoor; 30 June 2025 – 13 July 2025	48	2R	(United States) Caty McNally (PR)	208	Win	5–7, 6–2, 6–1
Wimbledon; London, United Kingdom; Grand Slam; Grass, outdoor; 30 June 2025 – 13 July 2025	49	3R	(United States) Danielle Collins	54	Win	6–2, 6–3
Wimbledon; London, United Kingdom; Grand Slam; Grass, outdoor; 30 June 2025 – 13 July 2025	50	4R	(Denmark) Clara Tauson (23)	22	Win	6–4, 6–1
Wimbledon; London, United Kingdom; Grand Slam; Grass, outdoor; 30 June 2025 – 13 July 2025	51	QF	Liudmila Samsonova (19)	19	Win	6–2, 7–5
Wimbledon; London, United Kingdom; Grand Slam; Grass, outdoor; 30 June 2025 – 13 July 2025	52	SF	(Switzerland) Belinda Bencic	35	Win	6–2, 6–0
Wimbledon; London, United Kingdom; Grand Slam; Grass, outdoor; 30 June 2025 – 13 July 2025	53	W	(United States) Amanda Anisimova (13)	12	Win (1)	6–0, 6–0
Canadian Open; Montreal, Canada; WTA 1000; Hard, outdoor; 27 July 2025 – 7 August 2025	–	1R	Bye			
Canadian Open; Montreal, Canada; WTA 1000; Hard, outdoor; 27 July 2025 – 7 August 2025	54	2R	(China) Guo Hanyu (Q)	259	Win	6–3, 6–1
Canadian Open; Montreal, Canada; WTA 1000; Hard, outdoor; 27 July 2025 – 7 August 2025	55	3R	(Germany) Eva Lys	69	Win	6–2, 6–2
Canadian Open; Montreal, Canada; WTA 1000; Hard, outdoor; 27 July 2025 – 7 August 2025	56	4R	(Denmark) Clara Tauson (16)	19	Loss	6–7^{(1–7)}, 3–6
Cincinnati Open; Mason, United States; WTA 1000; Hard, outdoor; 7 August 2025 – 18 August 2025	–	1R	Bye			
Cincinnati Open; Mason, United States; WTA 1000; Hard, outdoor; 7 August 2025 – 18 August 2025	57	2R	Anastasia Potapova	45	Win	6–1, 6–4
Cincinnati Open; Mason, United States; WTA 1000; Hard, outdoor; 7 August 2025 – 18 August 2025	–	3R	(Ukraine) Marta Kostyuk (25)	27	Walkover	—N/a
Cincinnati Open; Mason, United States; WTA 1000; Hard, outdoor; 7 August 2025 – 18 August 2025	58	4R	(Romania) Sorana Cîrstea (PR)	138	Win	6–4, 6–3
Cincinnati Open; Mason, United States; WTA 1000; Hard, outdoor; 7 August 2025 – 18 August 2025	59	QF	Anna Kalinskaya (28)	34	Win	6–3, 6–4
Cincinnati Open; Mason, United States; WTA 1000; Hard, outdoor; 7 August 2025 – 18 August 2025	60	SF	(Kazakhstan) Elena Rybakina (9)	10	Win	7–5, 6–3
Cincinnati Open; Mason, United States; WTA 1000; Hard, outdoor; 7 August 2025 – 18 August 2025	61	W	(Italy) Jasmine Paolini (7)	9	Win (2)	7–5, 6–4
US Open; New York City, United States; Grand Slam; Hard, outdoor; 24 August 2025 – 7 September 2025	62	1R	(Colombia) Emiliana Arango	81	Win	6–1, 6–2
US Open; New York City, United States; Grand Slam; Hard, outdoor; 24 August 2025 – 7 September 2025	63	2R	(Netherlands) Suzan Lamens	66	Win	6–1, 4–6, 6–4
US Open; New York City, United States; Grand Slam; Hard, outdoor; 24 August 2025 – 7 September 2025	64	3R	Anna Kalinskaya (29)	29	Win	7–6^{(7–2)}, 6–4
US Open; New York City, United States; Grand Slam; Hard, outdoor; 24 August 2025 – 7 September 2025	65	4R	Ekaterina Alexandrova (13)	12	Win	6–3, 6–1
US Open; New York City, United States; Grand Slam; Hard, outdoor; 24 August 2025 – 7 September 2025	66	QF	(United States) Amanda Anisimova (8)	9	Loss	4–6, 3–6
Korea Open; Seoul, South Korea; WTA 500; Hard, outdoor; 15 September 2025 – 21 September 2025	–	1R	Bye			
Korea Open; Seoul, South Korea; WTA 500; Hard, outdoor; 15 September 2025 – 21 September 2025	67	2R	(Romania) Sorana Cîrstea (PR)	66	Win	6–3, 6–2
Korea Open; Seoul, South Korea; WTA 500; Hard, outdoor; 15 September 2025 – 21 September 2025	68	QF	(Czech Republic) Barbora Krejčíková	39	Win	6–0, 6–3
Korea Open; Seoul, South Korea; WTA 500; Hard, outdoor; 15 September 2025 – 21 September 2025	69	SF	(Australia) Maya Joint	46	Win	6–0, 6–2
Korea Open; Seoul, South Korea; WTA 500; Hard, outdoor; 15 September 2025 – 21 September 2025	70	W	Ekaterina Alexandrova (2)	11	Win (3)	1–6, 7–6^{(7–3)}, 7–5
China Open; Beijing, China; WTA 1000; Hard, outdoor; 24 September 2025 – 5 October 2025	–	1R	Bye			
China Open; Beijing, China; WTA 1000; Hard, outdoor; 24 September 2025 – 5 October 2025	71	2R	(China) Yuan Yue (WC)	110	Win	6–0, 6–3
China Open; Beijing, China; WTA 1000; Hard, outdoor; 24 September 2025 – 5 October 2025	72	3R	(Colombia) Camila Osorio	83	Win	6–0, 0–0 ret.
China Open; Beijing, China; WTA 1000; Hard, outdoor; 24 September 2025 – 5 October 2025	73	4R	(United States) Emma Navarro (16)	17	Loss	4–6, 6–4, 0–6
Wuhan Open; Wuhan, China; WTA 1000; Hard, outdoor; 6 October 2025 – 12 October 2025	–	1R	Bye			
Wuhan Open; Wuhan, China; WTA 1000; Hard, outdoor; 6 October 2025 – 12 October 2025	74	2R	(Czech Republic) Marie Bouzková	41	Win	6–1, 6–1
Wuhan Open; Wuhan, China; WTA 1000; Hard, outdoor; 6 October 2025 – 12 October 2025	75	3R	(Switzerland) Belinda Bencic (13)	15	Win	7–6^{(7–2)}, 6–4
Wuhan Open; Wuhan, China; WTA 1000; Hard, outdoor; 6 October 2025 – 12 October 2025	76	QF	(Italy) Jasmine Paolini (7)	8	Loss	1–6, 2–6
WTA Finals; Riyadh, Saudi Arabia; Year-end championships; Hard, indoor; 1 November 2025 – 8 November 2025	77	RR	(United States) Madison Keys (7)	7	Win	6–1, 6–2
WTA Finals; Riyadh, Saudi Arabia; Year-end championships; Hard, indoor; 1 November 2025 – 8 November 2025	78	RR	(Kazakhstan) Elena Rybakina (6)	6	Loss	6–3, 1–6, 0–6
WTA Finals; Riyadh, Saudi Arabia; Year-end championships; Hard, indoor; 1 November 2025 – 8 November 2025	79	RR	(United States) Amanda Anisimova (4)	4	Loss	7–6^{(7–3)}, 4–6, 2–6
Billie Jean King Cup play-offs; Gorzów Wielkopolski, Poland; Billie Jean King Cup; Hard, indoor; 14 November 2025 – 16 November 2025	80	PO	(New Zealand) Elyse Tse	909	Win	6–0, 6–1
Billie Jean King Cup play-offs; Gorzów Wielkopolski, Poland; Billie Jean King Cup; Hard, indoor; 14 November 2025 – 16 November 2025	81	PO	(Romania) Gabriela Lee	292	Win	6–2, 6–0

=== Mixed doubles matches ===
Tournament	Match	Round	Opponent	Combined Rank	Result	Score
United Cup; Perth/Sydney, Australia; United Cup; Hard, outdoor; 27 December 2024 – 5 January 2025; Partner: (Poland) Hubert Hurkacz	1	RR	(Norway) Ulrikke Eikeri / (Norway) Casper Ruud	44	Win	6–3, 0–6, [10–8]
United Cup; Perth/Sydney, Australia; United Cup; Hard, outdoor; 27 December 2024 – 5 January 2025; Partner: (Poland) Hubert Hurkacz	2	RR	(Czech Republic) Tomáš Macháč / (Czech Republic) Karolína Muchová	47	Win	7–6^{(7–3)}, 6–3
United Cup; Perth/Sydney, Australia; United Cup; Hard, outdoor; 27 December 2024 – 5 January 2025; Partner: (Poland) Hubert Hurkacz	–	QF	(United Kingdom) Katie Boulter / (United Kingdom) Charles Broom	180	Withdrew	—N/a
United Cup; Perth/Sydney, Australia; United Cup; Hard, outdoor; 27 December 2024 – 5 January 2025; Partner: (Poland) Hubert Hurkacz	–	SF	(Kazakhstan) Elena Rybakina / (Kazakhstan) Alexander Shevchenko	84	Withdrew	—N/a
United Cup; Perth/Sydney, Australia; United Cup; Hard, outdoor; 27 December 2024 – 5 January 2025; Partner: (Poland) Hubert Hurkacz	–	F	(United States) Taylor Fritz / (United States) Coco Gauff	7	Withdrew	—N/a
US Open; New York City, United States; Grand Slam; Hard, outdoor; 24 August 2025 – 7 September 2025; Partner: (Norway) Casper Ruud	3	1R	(United States) Madison Keys / (United States) Frances Tiafoe	23	Win	4–1, 4–2
US Open; New York City, United States; Grand Slam; Hard, outdoor; 24 August 2025 – 7 September 2025; Partner: (Norway) Casper Ruud	4	QF	(United States) Caty McNally / (Italy) Lorenzo Musetti (WC)	97	Win	4–1, 4–2
US Open; New York City, United States; Grand Slam; Hard, outdoor; 24 August 2025 – 7 September 2025; Partner: (Norway) Casper Ruud	5	SF	(United Kingdom) Jack Draper / (United States) Jessica Pegula (1)	9	Win	3–5, 5–3, [10–8]
US Open; New York City, United States; Grand Slam; Hard, outdoor; 24 August 2025 – 7 September 2025; Partner: (Norway) Casper Ruud	6	F	(Italy) Sara Errani / (Italy) Andrea Vavassori (WC)	17	Loss	3–6, 7–5, [6–10]

== Tournament schedule ==
Key
W	F	SF	QF	#R	RR

(W) winner; (F) finalist; (SF) semifinalist; (QF) quarterfinalist; (#R) rounds 4, 3, 2, 1; (RR) round-robin stage.

=== Singles schedule ===
Date	Tournament	Location	Tier	Surface	Prev. result	Prev. points	New points	Result
27 December 2024 – 5 January 2025	United Cup	Australia	United Cup	Hard	F	500	325	Final lost to (United States) Coco Gauff; 4–6, 4–6
12 January 2025 – 26 January 2025	Australian Open	Australia	Grand Slam	Hard	3R	130	780	Semifinals lost to (United States) Madison Keys; 7–5, 1–6, 6–7^{(8–10)}
9 February 2025 – 15 February 2025	Qatar Open	Qatar	WTA 1000	Hard	W	1000	390	Semifinals lost to (Latvia) Jeļena Ostapenko; 3–6, 1–6
16 February 2025 – 22 February 2025	Dubai Tennis Championships	United Arab Emirates	WTA 1000	Hard	SF	390	215	Quarterfinals lost to Mirra Andreeva; 3–6, 3–6
5 March 2025 – 16 March 2025	Indian Wells Open	United States	WTA 1000	Hard	W	1000	390	Semifinals lost to Mirra Andreeva; 6–7^{(1–7)}, 6–1, 3–6
18 March 2025 – 30 March 2025	Miami Open	United States	WTA 1000	Hard	4R	120	215	Quarterfinals lost to (Philippines) Alexandra Eala; 2–6, 5–7
14 April 2025 – 21 April 2025	Stuttgart Open	Germany	WTA 500	Clay (i)	SF	195	108	Quarterfinals lost to (Latvia) Jeļena Ostapenko; 3–6, 6–3, 2–6
22 April 2025 – 4 May 2025	Madrid Open	Spain	WTA 1000	Clay	W	1000	390	Semifinals lost to (United States) Coco Gauff; 1–6, 1–6
7 May 2025 – 18 May 2025	Italian Open	Italy	WTA 1000	Clay	W	1000	65	Third round lost to (United States) Danielle Collins; 1–6, 5–7
26 May 2025 – 9 June 2025	French Open	France	Grand Slam	Clay	W	2000	780	Semifinals lost to Aryna Sabalenka; 6–7^{(1–7)}, 6–4, 0–6
23 June 2025 – 29 June 2025	Bad Homburg Open	Germany	WTA 500	Grass	A	0	325	Final lost to (United States) Jessica Pegula; 4–6, 5–7
30 June 2025 – 13 July 2025	Wimbledon	United Kingdom	Grand Slam	Grass	3R	130	2000	Winner defeated (United States) Amanda Anisimova; 6–0, 6–0
27 July 2025 – 7 August 2025	Canadian Open	Canada	WTA 1000	Hard	A	0	120	Fourth round lost to (Denmark) Clara Tauson; 6–7^{(1–7)}, 3–6
7 August 2025 – 18 August 2025	Cincinnati Open	United States	WTA 1000	Hard	SF	—N/a	1000	Winner defeated (Italy) Jasmine Paolini; 7–5, 6–4
24 August 2025 – 7 September 2025	US Open	United States	Grand Slam	Hard	QF	430	430	Quarterfinals lost to (United States) Amanda Anisimova; 4–6, 3–6
15 September 2025 – 21 September 2025	Korea Open	South Korea	WTA 500	Hard	A	0	500	Winner defeated Ekaterina Alexandrova; 1–6, 7–6^{(7–3)}, 7–5
24 September 2025 – 5 October 2025	China Open	China	WTA 1000	Hard	A	0	120	Fourth round lost to (United States) Emma Navarro; 4–6, 6–4, 0–6
6 October 2025 – 12 October 2025	Wuhan Open	China	WTA 1000	Hard	A	0	215	Quarterfinals lost to (Italy) Jasmine Paolini; 1–6, 2–6
1 November 2025 – 8 November 2025	WTA Finals	Saudi Arabia	WTA Finals	Hard	RR	400	200	Failed to advance into the semifinals 1 win & 2 losses
Total year-end points						8370	8395	

=== Mixed doubles schedule ===
Date	Tournament	Location	Tier	Surface	Prev. result	Result
27 December 2024 – 5 January 2025	United Cup	Australia	United Cup	Hard	F	Final withdrew against (United States) Taylor Fritz / (United States) Coco Gauff; N/A
24 August 2025 – 7 September 2025	US Open	United States	Grand Slam	Hard	A	Final lost to (Italy) Sara Errani / (Italy) Andrea Vavassori; 3–6, 7–5, [6–10]

== Yearly records ==
=== Head-to-head match-ups ===
Świątek has a 64–17 (79%) WTA match win–loss record in the 2025 season. Her record against players who were part of the WTA rankings top ten at the time of their meetings is 9–8 (53%). Bold indicates player was ranked top 10 at the time of at least one meeting. The following list is ordered by number of wins:

- **(Kazakhstan) Elena Rybakina** 4–1
- Ekaterina Alexandrova 3–0
- Victoria Azarenka 2–0
- (Switzerland) Belinda Bencic 2–0
- (Romania) Sorana Cîrstea 2–0
- (France) Caroline Garcia 2–0
- Anna Kalinskaya 2–0
- (Germany) Eva Lys 2–0
- (Czech Republic) Karolína Muchová 2–0
- (Czech Republic) Linda Nosková 2–0
- (United Kingdom) Emma Raducanu 2–0
- (Slovakia) Rebecca Šramková 2–0
- (Ukraine) Elina Svitolina 2–0
- (Ukraine) Dayana Yastremska 2–0
- **(United States) Madison Keys** 2–1
- **(Italy) Jasmine Paolini** 2–1
- (Colombia) Emiliana Arango 1–0
- (United Kingdom) Katie Boulter 1–0
- (Czech Republic) Marie Bouzková 1–0
- (Italy) Elisabetta Cocciaretto 1–0
- (Romania) Jaqueline Cristian 1–0
- (Croatia) Jana Fett 1–0
- (China) Guo Hanyu 1–0
- (Norway) Malene Helgø 1–0
- (Australia) Maya Joint 1–0
- (Czech Republic) Barbora Krejčíková 1–0
- Polina Kudermetova 1–0
- (Netherlands) Suzan Lamens 1–0
- (Romania) Gabriela Lee 1–0
- (United States) Caty McNally 1–0
- (Belgium) Elise Mertens 1–0
- (Colombia) Camila Osorio 1–0
- Anastasia Potapova 1–0
- (Greece) Maria Sakkari 1–0
- Liudmila Samsonova 1–0
- Diana Shnaider 1–0
- (Czech Republic) Kateřina Siniaková 1–0
- (New Zealand) Elyse Tse 1–0
- (China) Yuan Yue 1–0
- **(China) Zheng Qinwen** 1–0
- (United States) Danielle Collins 1–1
- (Philippines) Alexandra Eala 1–1
- **(United States) Emma Navarro** 1–1
- (Denmark) Clara Tauson 1–1
- (United States) **Amanda Anisimova** 1–2
- **(United States) Jessica Pegula** 0–1
- **Aryna Sabalenka** 0–1
- Mirra Andreeva 0–2
- **(United States) Coco Gauff** 0–2
- (Latvia) Jeļena Ostapenko 0–2

=== Top 10 record ===
- Key: (Rk) first use, opponent rank; (Rd) round; (Rk) 2nd use, player rank; (Ref) reference; (F) final; (SF) semifinal; (QF) quarterfinal; (#R) rounds 4, 3, 2, 1; (RR) round-robin stage; (Q#) qualifying rounds or stages (3), 2, 1.

==== Singles ====
Result	W–L	Opponent	Rk	Tournament	Surface	Rd	Score	Rk	Ref
Win	1–0	(Kazakhstan) Elena Rybakina	6	United Cup, Australia	Hard	SF	7–6^{(7–5)}, 6–4	2	
Loss	1–1	(United States) Coco Gauff	3	United Cup, Australia	Hard	F	4–6, 4–6	2	
Win	2–1	(United States) Emma Navarro	8	Australian Open, Australia	Hard	QF	6–1, 6–2	2	
Win	3–1	(Kazakhstan) Elena Rybakina	7	Qatar Open, Qatar	Hard	QF	6–2, 7–5	2	
Win	4–1	(China) Zheng Qinwen	9	Indian Wells Open, United States	Hard	QF	6–3, 6–3	2	
Win	5–1	(United States) Madison Keys	5	Madrid Open, Spain	Clay	QF	0–6, 6–3, 6–2	2	
Loss	5–2	(United States) Coco Gauff	4	Madrid Open, Spain	Clay	SF	1–6, 1–6	2	
Loss	5–3	Aryna Sabalenka	**1**	French Open, France	Clay	SF	6–7^{(1–7)}, 6–4, 0–6	5	
Win	6–3	(Italy) Jasmine Paolini	4	Bad Homburg Open, Germany	Grass	SF	6–1, 6–3	8	
Loss	6–4	(United States) Jessica Pegula	3	Bad Homburg Open, Germany	Grass	F	4–6, 5–7	8	
Win	7–4	(Kazakhstan) Elena Rybakina	10	Cincinnati Open, United States	Hard	SF	7–5, 6–3	3	
Win	8–4	(Italy) Jasmine Paolini	9	Cincinnati Open, United States	Hard	F	7–5, 6–4	3	
Loss	8–5	(United States) Amanda Anisimova	9	US Open, United States	Hard	QF	4–6, 3–6	2	
Loss	8–6	(Italy) Jasmine Paolini	8	Wuhan Open, China	Hard	QF	1–6, 2–6	2	
Win	9–6	(United States) Madison Keys	7	WTA Finals, Saudi Arabia	Hard (i)	RR	6–1, 6–2	2	
Loss	9–7	(Kazakhstan) Elena Rybakina	6	WTA Finals, Saudi Arabia	Hard (i)	RR	6–3, 1–6, 0–6	2	
Loss	9–8	(United States) Amanda Anisimova	4	WTA Finals, Saudi Arabia	Hard (i)	RR	7–6^{(7–3)}, 4–6, 2–6	2	

=== Finals ===
==== Singles: 4 (3 titles, 1 runner-up) ====
Legend Grand Slam tournaments (1–0) WTA Tour Championships (0–0) WTA Elite Trophy (0–0) WTA 1000 (1–0) WTA 500 (1–1) WTA 250 (0–0)	Finals by surface Hard (2–0) Clay (0–0) Grass (1–1)	Finals by setting Outdoor (3–1) Indoor (0–0)

Result	W–L	Date	Tournament	Tier	Surface	Opponent	Score
Loss	0–1	Jun 2025	Bad Homburg Open, Germany	WTA 500	Grass	(United States) Jessica Pegula	4–6, 5–7
Win	1–1	Jul 2025	Wimbledon, United Kingdom	Grand Slam	Grass	(United States) Amanda Anisimova	6–0, 6–0
Win	2–1	Aug 2025	Cincinnati Open, United States	WTA 1000	Hard	(Italy) Jasmine Paolini	7–5, 6–4
Win	3–1	Sep 2025	Korea Open, South Korea	WTA 500	Hard	Ekaterina Alexandrova	1–6, 7–6^{(7–3)}, 7–5

=== Earnings ===
#	Tournament	Singles Prize money	Doubles Prize money	Mixed doubles Prize money	Year-to-date
1.	United Cup	$600,900	$0	$0	$600,900
2.	Australian Open	$694,291	$0	$0	$1,295,191
3.	Qatar Open	$181,400	$0	$0	$1,476,591
4.	Dubai Tennis Championships	$83,470	$0	$0	$1,560,061
5.	Indian Wells Open	$333,125	$0	$0	$1,893,186
6.	Miami Open	$189,075	$0	$0	$2,082,261
7.	Stuttgart Open	$24,950	$0	$0	$2,107,211
8.	Madrid Open	$332,160	$0	$0	$2,439,371
9.	Italian Open	$44,057	$0	$0	$2,483,428
10.	French Open	$747,079	$0	$0	$3,230,507
11.	Bad Homburg Open	$101,000	$0	$0	$3,331,507
12.	Wimbledon Championships	$4,066,572	$0	$0	$7,398,079
13.	Canadian Open	$56,703	$0	$0	$7,454,782
14.	Cincinnati Open	$752,275	$0	$0	$8,207,057
15.	US Open	$660,000	$0	$200,000	$9,067,057
16.	Korea Open	$164,000	$0	$0	$9,231,057
17.	China Open	$103,225	$0	$0	$9,334,282
18.	Wuhan Open	$83,250	$0	$0	$9,417,532
19.	WTA Finals	$695,000	$0	$0	$10,112,532
**Total prize money**		**$9,912,532**	**$0**	**$200,000**	**$10,112,532**

== See also ==
- 2025 Coco Gauff tennis season
- 2025 Madison Keys tennis season
- 2025 Aryna Sabalenka tennis season
- 2025 Elena Rybakina tennis season
