= 2025 Aryna Sabalenka tennis season =

2025 tennis player season

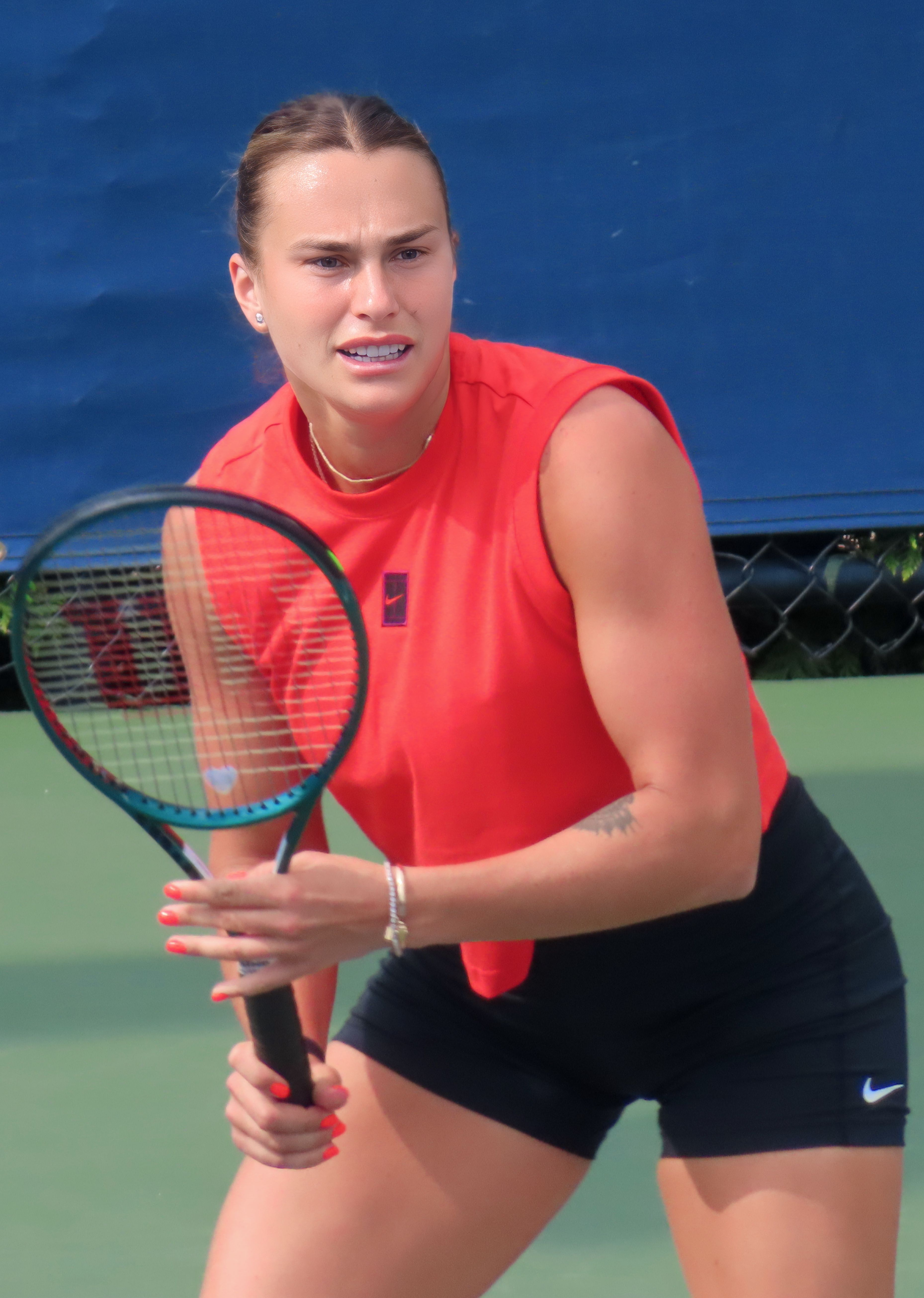
- Sabalenka at the 2024 US Open
- Full name: Aryna Siarhiejeŭna Sabalenka
- Country: (not allowed to play under the Belarusian flag)
- Calendar prize money: $15,008,519

Singles
- Season record: 63–12 (84%)
- Calendar titles: 4
- Current ranking: No. 1
- Year-end ranking: No. 1
- Ranking change from previous year: Steady

Grand Slam & significant results
- Australian Open: F
- French Open: F
- Wimbledon: SF
- US Open: W
- Championships: F
- Last updated on: 23 November 2025.

The 2025 Aryna Sabalenka tennis season officially began on 30 December 2024, with the start of the Brisbane International in Brisbane and concluded at the 2025 WTA Finals. Notably, Sabalenka was ranked No. 1 during all 52 weeks of 2025. For her performance in the year, she won the 2026 Laureus World Sports Award for Sportswoman of the Year.

== Yearly summary ==
=== Early hard court season ===
Sabalenka started 2025 by winning the Brisbane International, defeating Renata Zarazúa, Yulia Putintseva, Marie Bouzková, and Mirra Andreeva to reach the final, where she came back from a set down against Polina Kudermetova to claim the 18th singles title of her career.

Sabalenka kick started her quest for a three-peat at the Australian Open by defeating former world No. 3, Sloane Stephens, in straight sets in the first round. In the second and third rounds, she defeated Jéssica Bouzas Maneiro and Clara Tauson, respectively, both matches ending in straight sets. Sabalenka then continued her journey at the Australian Open by defeating Mirra Andreeva, Anastasia Pavlyuchenkova, and Paula Badosa to advance to the final for the third time in a row. In the final, Sabalenka lost in three sets to Madison Keys, who won her first major title.

At the Qatar Ladies Open she lost in the first round to Ekaterina Alexandrova in three sets. At the Dubai Championships, Sabalenka defeated Veronika Kudermetova in straight sets. In the round of 16, she faced Clara Tauson, whom she played at the Australian Open earlier in the year but this time Sabalenka lost in straight sets. After her loss in Dubai, Sabalenka played at Indian Wells where she defeated McCartney Kessler in straight sets. She then defeated Bronzetti and in the fourth round, Sabalenka took on lucky loser Sonay Kartal and recorded again a straight set win. She advanced to the semifinals after defeating Liudmila Samsonova. Her next opponent was Madison Keys, who defeated her at the Australian Open earlier in the year, but this time Sabalenka took her revenge to reach the final, where she lost to Mirra Andreeva in three sets.

Sabalenka then played at the Miami Open. In the second round, Sabalenka defeated Viktoriya Tomova in straight sets to advance to the third round. Next Sabalenka faced Elena-Gabriela Ruse and won the match as Ruse retired injured. In the fourth round, Sabalenka defeated defending champion Danielle Collins. She continued with straight-set victories over Qinwen Zheng and Jasmine Paolini to reach the final. There, Sabalenka defeated Pegula in straight sets to claim her first Miami Open title.

=== Clay court season ===
At the Stuttgart Open Sabalenka was supposed to face Anastasia Potapova but Potapova withdrew after winning her first match. Sabalenka defeated Elise Mertens in the quarterfinals and fifth seed Jasmine Paolini in the semifinals to reach her fifth final of the season. She lost the championship match for the fourth time at the tournament to unseeded Jeļena Ostapenko.

In the second round of the Mutua Madrid Open, Sabalenka defeated Anna Blinkova in straight sets. She came back from one set down against Elise Mertens to advance to the fourth round. Following straight sets victories over Peyton Stearns and Marta Kostyuk she advanced to the semifinals, where she defeated Elina Svitolina to reach her fourth Madrid final. With her win over Coco Gauff in the final, Sabalenka claimed her third Madrid Open title and became the third woman to surpass 11,000 points in the WTA ranking.

In Rome, Sabalenka won her second-round match against Anastasia Potapova in straight sets. In the third round against Sofia Kenin she came back from a set down to win. In the fourth round she faced Marta Kostyuk, whom she had played earlier in Madrid; Sabalenka defeated Kostyuk in straight sets to advance to the quarterfinal, where she lost to Zheng Qinwen.

At the French Open, Sabalenka defeated in straight sets Kamilla Rakhimova, Jil Teichmann, Olga Danilović and Amanda Anisimova to reach the quarterfinals where she faced Zheng Qinwen and avenged her Italian Open loss to this player. Sabalenka defeated the defending champion Iga Świątek in the semifinals and lost to Coco Gauff in the final.

=== Grass court season ===
Sabalenka then played at the Berlin Open. She won in straight sets in her second-round match against Rebeka Masarova. In the quarterfinal, she faced Elena Rybakina; Sabalenka came back from 2-6 down in the final-set tiebreak and saved 4 match points to defeat Rybakina and advance to the semifinal, where she lost to Markéta Vondroušová in straight sets.

After Berlin, Sabalenka played at the Wimbledon Championship. Sabalenka beat Carson Branstine, Marie Bouzkova, Emma Raducanu, Elise Mertens, and Laura Siegemund to advance to the semifinal. In the semifinal, Sabalenka lost to Amanda Anisimova.

=== North American hard court season ===
Sabalenka withdrew from the National Bank Open due to fatigue.

Sabalenka then played at the Cincinnati Open. Sabalenka played Markéta Vondroušová in the second round, where she won in straight sets. In the third round, Sabalenka played Emma Raducanu, and Sabalenka won in three sets. In the fourth round, Sabalenka defeated Jessica Bouzas Maneiro in straight set to advance to the quarterfinal where she faced Elena Rybakina. Sabalenka lost to Rybakina in straight set in the quarterfinal.

After Cincinnati, Sabalenka played at the US Open. She defeated Rebeka Masarova, Polina Kudermetova, Leylah Fernandez, and Cristina Bucșa to reach her twelfth consecutive major quarterfinal. Her quarterfinal opponent Markéta Vondroušová withdrew with an injury, and Sabalenka received a walkover into the semifinal. In the semifinal, Sabalenka faced Jessica Pegula in a rematch of the 2024 final, winning in three sets and reaching her third consecutive US Open final. Sabalenka faced Amanda Anisimova in the final, in a rematch of their Wimbledon semifinal. Sabalenka went on to win the final in straight sets, winning her fourth major title and second consecutive US Open title. With her win, she became the first singles player to defend a US Open title since Serena Williams won the 2014 US Open.

=== Asian swing ===
Sabalenka withdrew from Beijing due to injury.

Sabalenka then played at the Wuhan Open, where she is a three-time defending champion. In the second round, Sabalenka beat Rebecca Sramkova from a set down to advance into the third round, and defeated Liudmila Samsonova in straght set. Then, in the quarterfinal, Sabalenka defeated Elena Rybakina in straight set to advance to the semifinal. Sabalenka lost to Jessica Pegula in the semifinal, and ended her 20 matches winning streak in Wuhan.

After Wuhan, Sabalenka played at the WTA Finals. Sabalenka won three matches in her group stage by beating Jasmine Paolini, Jessica Pegula, and Coco Gauff, and advance to the semifinal, where she faced Amanda Anisimova. In the semifinal, Sabalenka defeated Anisimova in three sets and advanced to the final where she took on Elena Rybakina. In the final, Sabalenka lost to Rybakina in straight sets.

=== Exhibition: Battle of the Sexes ===
On 28 December 2025, Sabalenka (women's singles world No. 1) and Nick Kyrgios (men's singles world No. 671) contested an exhibition match promoted as the Battle of the Sexes at the Coca-Cola Arena in Dubai. The event was organized by their shared management agency, Evolve. The match was played as a three-set contest under modified rules: the dimensions of Sabalenka's side of the court were reduced by 9%, and both players were restricted to a single serve per point. In the event of a tie, a 10-point match tiebreak would have been played. According to Evolve, the court-size adjustment was intended to "reflect average movement-speed differences between men and women". Kyrgios defeated Sabalenka in straight sets, 6–3, 6–3.

== All matches ==
This table chronicles all the matches of Aryna Sabalenka in 2025.

Key
W	F	SF	QF	#R	RR	Q#	P#	DNQ	A	Z#	PO	G	S	B	NMS	NTI	P	NH

(W) winner; (F) finalist; (SF) semifinalist; (QF) quarterfinalist; (#R) rounds 4, 3, 2, 1; (RR) round-robin stage; (Q#) qualification round; (P#) preliminary round; (DNQ) did not qualify; (A) absent; (Z#) Davis/Fed Cup Zonal Group (with number indication) or (PO) play-off; (G) gold, (S) silver or (B) bronze Olympic/Paralympic medal; (NMS) not a Masters tournament; (NTI) not a Tier I tournament; (P) postponed; (NH) not held; (SR) strike rate (events won / competed); (W–L) win–loss record.
To avoid confusion and double counting, these charts are updated at the conclusion of a tournament or when the player's participation has ended.

=== Singles matches ===
Tournament	Match	Round	Opponent	Rank	Result	Score
Brisbane International; Brisbane, Australia; WTA 500; Hard, outdoor; 30 December 2024 – 6 January 2025	–	1R	Bye			
Brisbane International; Brisbane, Australia; WTA 500; Hard, outdoor; 30 December 2024 – 6 January 2025	1	2R	(Mexico) Renata Zarazúa	75	Win	6–4, 6–0
Brisbane International; Brisbane, Australia; WTA 500; Hard, outdoor; 30 December 2024 – 6 January 2025	2	3R	(Kazakhstan) Yulia Putintseva (15)	29	Win	7–6^{(7–2)}, 6–4
Brisbane International; Brisbane, Australia; WTA 500; Hard, outdoor; 30 December 2024 – 6 January 2025	3	QF	(Czech Republic) Marie Bouzková	44	Win	6–3, 6–4
Brisbane International; Brisbane, Australia; WTA 500; Hard, outdoor; 30 December 2024 – 6 January 2025	4	SF	Mirra Andreeva (Note: Russian and Belarus players are not allowed to compete under the name or flag of their country following the Russian invasion of Ukraine.) (8)	16	Win	6–3, 6–2
Brisbane International; Brisbane, Australia; WTA 500; Hard, outdoor; 30 December 2024 – 6 January 2025	5	W	Polina Kudermetova (Q)	107	Win (1)	4–6, 6–3, 6–2
Australian Open; Melbourne, Australia; Grand Slam; Hard, outdoor; 12 January 2025 – 26 January 2025	6	1R	(United States) Sloane Stephens	81	Win	6–3, 6–2
Australian Open; Melbourne, Australia; Grand Slam; Hard, outdoor; 12 January 2025 – 26 January 2025	7	2R	(Spain) Jéssica Bouzas Maneiro	54	Win	6–3, 7–5
Australian Open; Melbourne, Australia; Grand Slam; Hard, outdoor; 12 January 2025 – 26 January 2025	8	3R	(Denmark) Clara Tauson	42	Win	7–6^{(7–5)}, 6–4
Australian Open; Melbourne, Australia; Grand Slam; Hard, outdoor; 12 January 2025 – 26 January 2025	9	4R	Mirra Andreeva (14)	15	Win	6–1, 6–2
Australian Open; Melbourne, Australia; Grand Slam; Hard, outdoor; 12 January 2025 – 26 January 2025	10	QF	Anastasia Pavlyuchenkova (27)	32	Win	6–2, 2–6, 6–3
Australian Open; Melbourne, Australia; Grand Slam; Hard, outdoor; 12 January 2025 – 26 January 2025	11	SF	(Spain) Paula Badosa (11)	12	Win	6–4, 6–2
Australian Open; Melbourne, Australia; Grand Slam; Hard, outdoor; 12 January 2025 – 26 January 2025	12	F	(United States) Madison Keys (19)	14	Loss	3–6, 6–2, 5–7
Qatar Open; Doha, Qatar; WTA 1000; Hard, outdoor; 9 February 2025 – 15 February 2025	–	1R	Bye			
Qatar Open; Doha, Qatar; WTA 1000; Hard, outdoor; 9 February 2025 – 15 February 2025	13	2R	Ekaterina Alexandrova	26	Loss	6–3, 3–6, 6–7^{(5–7)}
Dubai Tennis Championships; Dubai, United Arab Emirates; WTA 1000; Hard, outdoor; 16 February 2025 – 22 February 2025	–	1R	Bye			
Dubai Tennis Championships; Dubai, United Arab Emirates; WTA 1000; Hard, outdoor; 16 February 2025 – 22 February 2025	14	2R	Veronika Kudermetova (Q)	50	Win	6–3, 6–4
Dubai Tennis Championships; Dubai, United Arab Emirates; WTA 1000; Hard, outdoor; 16 February 2025 – 22 February 2025	15	3R	(Denmark) Clara Tauson	38	Loss	3–6, 2–6
Indian Wells Open; Indian Wells, United States; WTA 1000; Hard, outdoor; 5 March 2025 – 16 March 2025	–	1R	Bye			
Indian Wells Open; Indian Wells, United States; WTA 1000; Hard, outdoor; 5 March 2025 – 16 March 2025	16	2R	(United States) McCartney Kessler	48	Win	7–6^{(7–4)}, 6–3
Indian Wells Open; Indian Wells, United States; WTA 1000; Hard, outdoor; 5 March 2025 – 16 March 2025	17	3R	(Italy) Lucia Bronzetti	62	Win	6–1, 6–2
Indian Wells Open; Indian Wells, United States; WTA 1000; Hard, outdoor; 5 March 2025 – 16 March 2025	18	4R	(United Kingdom) Sonay Kartal (LL)	83	Win	6–1, 6–2
Indian Wells Open; Indian Wells, United States; WTA 1000; Hard, outdoor; 5 March 2025 – 16 March 2025	19	QF	Liudmila Samsonova (24)	25	Win	6–2, 6–3
Indian Wells Open; Indian Wells, United States; WTA 1000; Hard, outdoor; 5 March 2025 – 16 March 2025	20	SF	(United States) Madison Keys (5)	5	Win	6–0, 6–1
Indian Wells Open; Indian Wells, United States; WTA 1000; Hard, outdoor; 5 March 2025 – 16 March 2025	21	F	Mirra Andreeva (9)	11	Loss	6–2, 4–6, 3–6
Miami Open; Miami Gardens, United States; WTA 1000; Hard, outdoor; 18 March 2025 – 30 March 2025	–	1R	Bye			
Miami Open; Miami Gardens, United States; WTA 1000; Hard, outdoor; 18 March 2025 – 30 March 2025	22	2R	(Bulgaria) Viktoriya Tomova	64	Win	6–3, 6–0
Miami Open; Miami Gardens, United States; WTA 1000; Hard, outdoor; 18 March 2025 – 30 March 2025	23	3R	(Romania) Elena-Gabriela Ruse (Q)	102	Win	6–1, ret.
Miami Open; Miami Gardens, United States; WTA 1000; Hard, outdoor; 18 March 2025 – 30 March 2025	24	4R	(United States) Danielle Collins (14)	15	Win	6–4, 6–4
Miami Open; Miami Gardens, United States; WTA 1000; Hard, outdoor; 18 March 2025 – 30 March 2025	25	QF	(China) Zheng Qinwen (9)	9	Win	6–2, 7–5
Miami Open; Miami Gardens, United States; WTA 1000; Hard, outdoor; 18 March 2025 – 30 March 2025	26	SF	(Italy) Jasmine Paolini (6)	7	Win	6–2, 6–2
Miami Open; Miami Gardens, United States; WTA 1000; Hard, outdoor; 18 March 2025 – 30 March 2025	27	W	(United States) Jessica Pegula (4)	4	Win (2)	7–5, 6–2
Stuttgart Open; Stuttgart, Germany; WTA 500; Clay, indoor; 14 April 2025 – 21 April 2025	–	1R	Bye			
Stuttgart Open; Stuttgart, Germany; WTA 500; Clay, indoor; 14 April 2025 – 21 April 2025	–	2R	Anastasia Potapova	38	Walkover	—N/a
Stuttgart Open; Stuttgart, Germany; WTA 500; Clay, indoor; 14 April 2025 – 21 April 2025	28	QF	(Belgium) Elise Mertens	29	Win	6–4, 6–1
Stuttgart Open; Stuttgart, Germany; WTA 500; Clay, indoor; 14 April 2025 – 21 April 2025	29	SF	(Italy) Jasmine Paolini (5)	6	Win	7–5, 6–4
Stuttgart Open; Stuttgart, Germany; WTA 500; Clay, indoor; 14 April 2025 – 21 April 2025	30	F	(Latvia) Jeļena Ostapenko	24	Loss	4–6, 1–6
Madrid Open; Madrid, Spain; WTA 1000; Clay, outdoor; 22 April 2025 – 4 May 2025	–	1R	Bye			
Madrid Open; Madrid, Spain; WTA 1000; Clay, outdoor; 22 April 2025 – 4 May 2025	31	2R	Anna Blinkova (Q)	76	Win	6–3, 6–4
Madrid Open; Madrid, Spain; WTA 1000; Clay, outdoor; 22 April 2025 – 4 May 2025	32	3R	(Belgium) Elise Mertens (28)	26	Win	3–6, 6–2, 6–1
Madrid Open; Madrid, Spain; WTA 1000; Clay, outdoor; 22 April 2025 – 4 May 2025	33	4R	(United States) Peyton Stearns	44	Win	6–2, 6–4
Madrid Open; Madrid, Spain; WTA 1000; Clay, outdoor; 22 April 2025 – 4 May 2025	34	QF	(Ukraine) Marta Kostyuk (24)	36	Win	7–6^{(7–4)}, 7–6^{(9–7)}
Madrid Open; Madrid, Spain; WTA 1000; Clay, outdoor; 22 April 2025 – 4 May 2025	35	SF	(Ukraine) Elina Svitolina (17)	17	Win	6–3, 7–5
Madrid Open; Madrid, Spain; WTA 1000; Clay, outdoor; 22 April 2025 – 4 May 2025	36	W	(United States) Coco Gauff (4)	4	Win (3)	6–3, 7–6^{(7–3)}
Italian Open; Rome, Italy; WTA 1000; Clay, outdoor; 6 May 2025 – 18 May 2025	–	1R	Bye			
Italian Open; Rome, Italy; WTA 1000; Clay, outdoor; 6 May 2025 – 18 May 2025	37	2R	Anastasia Potapova	34	Win	6–2, 6–2
Italian Open; Rome, Italy; WTA 1000; Clay, outdoor; 6 May 2025 – 18 May 2025	38	3R	(United States) Sofia Kenin (31)	31	Win	3–6, 6–3, 6–3
Italian Open; Rome, Italy; WTA 1000; Clay, outdoor; 6 May 2025 – 18 May 2025	39	4R	(Ukraine) Marta Kostyuk	27	Win	6–1, 7–6^{(10–8)}
Italian Open; Rome, Italy; WTA 1000; Clay, outdoor; 6 May 2025 – 18 May 2025	40	QF	(China) Zheng Qinwen (8)	8	Loss	4–6, 3–6
French Open; Paris, France; Grand Slam; Clay, outdoor; 25 May 2025 – 8 June 2025	41	1R	Kamilla Rakhimova	86	Win	6–1, 6–0
French Open; Paris, France; Grand Slam; Clay, outdoor; 25 May 2025 – 8 June 2025	42	2R	(Switzerland) Jil Teichmann	97	Win	6–3, 6–1
French Open; Paris, France; Grand Slam; Clay, outdoor; 25 May 2025 – 8 June 2025	43	3R	(Serbia) Olga Danilović	34	Win	6–2, 6–3
French Open; Paris, France; Grand Slam; Clay, outdoor; 25 May 2025 – 8 June 2025	44	4R	(United States) Amanda Anisimova (16)	16	Win	7–5, 6–3
French Open; Paris, France; Grand Slam; Clay, outdoor; 25 May 2025 – 8 June 2025	45	QF	(China) Zheng Qinwen (8)	7	Win	7–6^{(7–3)}, 6–3
French Open; Paris, France; Grand Slam; Clay, outdoor; 25 May 2025 – 8 June 2025	46	SF	(Poland) Iga Świątek (5)	5	Win	7–6^{(7–1)}, 4–6, 6–0
French Open; Paris, France; Grand Slam; Clay, outdoor; 25 May 2025 – 8 June 2025	47	F	(United States) Coco Gauff (2)	2	Loss	7–6^{(7–5)}, 2–6, 4–6
Berlin Tennis Open; Berlin, Germany; WTA 500; Grass, outdoor; 16 June 2025 – 22 June 2025	–	1R	Bye			
Berlin Tennis Open; Berlin, Germany; WTA 500; Grass, outdoor; 16 June 2025 – 22 June 2025	48	2R	(Switzerland) Rebeka Masarova (Q)	112	Win	6–2, 7–6^{(8–6)}
Berlin Tennis Open; Berlin, Germany; WTA 500; Grass, outdoor; 16 June 2025 – 22 June 2025	49	QF	(Kazakhstan) Elena Rybakina	11	Win	7–6^{(8–6)}, 3–6, 7–6^{(8–6)}
Berlin Tennis Open; Berlin, Germany; WTA 500; Grass, outdoor; 16 June 2025 – 22 June 2025	50	SF	(Czech Republic) Markéta Vondroušová (PR)	164	Loss	2–6, 4–6
Wimbledon; London, United Kingdom; Grand Slam; Grass, outdoor; 30 June 2025 – 13 July 2025	51	1R	(Canada) Carson Branstine (Q)	194	Win	6–1, 7–5
Wimbledon; London, United Kingdom; Grand Slam; Grass, outdoor; 30 June 2025 – 13 July 2025	52	2R	(Czech Republic) Marie Bouzková	48	Win	7–6^{(7–4)}, 6–4
Wimbledon; London, United Kingdom; Grand Slam; Grass, outdoor; 30 June 2025 – 13 July 2025	53	3R	(United Kingdom) Emma Raducanu	40	Win	7–6^{(8–6)}, 6–4
Wimbledon; London, United Kingdom; Grand Slam; Grass, outdoor; 30 June 2025 – 13 July 2025	54	4R	(Belgium) Elise Mertens (24)	23	Win	6–4, 7–6^{(7–4)}
Wimbledon; London, United Kingdom; Grand Slam; Grass, outdoor; 30 June 2025 – 13 July 2025	55	QF	(Germany) Laura Siegemund	104	Win	4–6, 6–2, 6–4
Wimbledon; London, United Kingdom; Grand Slam; Grass, outdoor; 30 June 2025 – 13 July 2025	56	SF	(United States) Amanda Anisimova (13)	12	Loss	4–6, 6–4, 4–6
Canadian Open; Montreal, Canada; WTA 1000; Hard, outdoor; 27 July 2025 – 7 August 2025	Withdrew					
Cincinnati Open; Mason, United States; WTA 1000; Hard, outdoor; 7 August 2025 – 18 August 2025	–	1R	Bye			
Cincinnati Open; Mason, United States; WTA 1000; Hard, outdoor; 7 August 2025 – 18 August 2025	57	2R	(Czech Republic) Markéta Vondroušová (PR)	59	Win	7–5, 6–1
Cincinnati Open; Mason, United States; WTA 1000; Hard, outdoor; 7 August 2025 – 18 August 2025	58	3R	(United Kingdom) Emma Raducanu (30)	39	Win	7–6^{(7–3)}, 4–6, 7–6^{(7–5)}
Cincinnati Open; Mason, United States; WTA 1000; Hard, outdoor; 7 August 2025 – 18 August 2025	59	4R	(Spain) Jéssica Bouzas Maneiro	42	Win	6–1, 7–5
Cincinnati Open; Mason, United States; WTA 1000; Hard, outdoor; 7 August 2025 – 18 August 2025	60	QF	(Kazakhstan) Elena Rybakina (9)	10	Loss	1–6, 4–6
US Open; New York City, United States; Grand Slam; Hard, outdoor; 24 August 2025 – 7 September 2025	61	1R	(Switzerland) Rebeka Masarova	108	Win	7–5, 6–1
US Open; New York City, United States; Grand Slam; Hard, outdoor; 24 August 2025 – 7 September 2025	62	2R	Polina Kudermetova	67	Win	7–6^{(7–4)}, 6–2
US Open; New York City, United States; Grand Slam; Hard, outdoor; 24 August 2025 – 7 September 2025	63	3R	(Canada) Leylah Fernandez (31)	30	Win	6–3, 7–6^{(7–2)}
US Open; New York City, United States; Grand Slam; Hard, outdoor; 24 August 2025 – 7 September 2025	64	4R	(Spain) Cristina Bucșa	95	Win	6–1, 6–4
US Open; New York City, United States; Grand Slam; Hard, outdoor; 24 August 2025 – 7 September 2025	–	QF	(Czech Republic) Markéta Vondroušová	60	Walkover	—N/a
US Open; New York City, United States; Grand Slam; Hard, outdoor; 24 August 2025 – 7 September 2025	65	SF	(United States) Jessica Pegula (4)	4	Win	4–6, 6–3, 6–4
US Open; New York City, United States; Grand Slam; Hard, outdoor; 24 August 2025 – 7 September 2025	66	W	(United States) Amanda Anisimova (8)	9	Win (4)	6–3, 7–6^{(7–3)}
Wuhan Open; Wuhan, China; WTA 1000; Hard, outdoor; 6 October 2025 – 12 October 2025	–	1R	Bye			
Wuhan Open; Wuhan, China; WTA 1000; Hard, outdoor; 6 October 2025 – 12 October 2025	67	2R	(Slovakia) Rebecca Šramková	68	Win	4–6, 6–3, 6–1
Wuhan Open; Wuhan, China; WTA 1000; Hard, outdoor; 6 October 2025 – 12 October 2025	68	3R	Liudmila Samsonova (16)	20	Win	6–3, 6–2
Wuhan Open; Wuhan, China; WTA 1000; Hard, outdoor; 6 October 2025 – 12 October 2025	69	QF	(Kazakhstan) Elena Rybakina (8)	9	Win	6–3, 6–3
Wuhan Open; Wuhan, China; WTA 1000; Hard, outdoor; 6 October 2025 – 12 October 2025	70	SF	(United States) Jessica Pegula (6)	6	Loss	6–2, 4–6, 6–7^{(2–7)}
WTA Finals; Riyadh, Saudi Arabia; Year-end championships; Hard, indoor; 1 November 2025 – 8 November 2025	71	RR	(Italy) Jasmine Paolini (8)	8	Win	6–3, 6–1
WTA Finals; Riyadh, Saudi Arabia; Year-end championships; Hard, indoor; 1 November 2025 – 8 November 2025	72	RR	(United States) Jessica Pegula (5)	5	Win	6–4, 2–6, 6–3
WTA Finals; Riyadh, Saudi Arabia; Year-end championships; Hard, indoor; 1 November 2025 – 8 November 2025	73	RR	(United States) Coco Gauff (3)	3	Win	7–6^{(7–5)}, 6–2
WTA Finals; Riyadh, Saudi Arabia; Year-end championships; Hard, indoor; 1 November 2025 – 8 November 2025	74	SF	(United States) Amanda Anisimova (4)	4	Win	6–3, 3–6, 6–3
WTA Finals; Riyadh, Saudi Arabia; Year-end championships; Hard, indoor; 1 November 2025 – 8 November 2025	75	F	(Kazakhstan) Elena Rybakina (6)	6	Loss	3–6, 6–7^{(0–7)}

== Schedule ==
Per Aryna Sabalenka, this is her current 2025 schedule (subject to change).

=== Singles schedule ===
Key
W	F	SF	QF	#R	RR

(W) winner; (F) finalist; (SF) semifinalist; (QF) quarterfinalist; (#R) rounds 4, 3, 2, 1; (RR) round-robin stage.

Date	Tournament	Location	Tier	Surface	Prev. result	Prev. points	New points	Result
30 December 2024 – 6 January 2025	Brisbane International	Australia	WTA 500	Hard	F	325	500	Winner defeated Polina Kudermetova; 4–6, 6–3, 6–2
12 January 2025– 26 January 2025	Australian Open	Australia	Grand Slam	Hard	W	2000	1300	Final lost to (United States) Madison Keys; 3–6, 6–2, 5–7
9 February 2025 – 15 February 2025	Qatar Open	Qatar	WTA 1000	Hard	A	0	10	Second round lost to Ekaterina Alexandrova; 6–3, 3–6, 6–7^{(5–7)}
16 February 2025 – 22 February 2025	Dubai Tennis Championships	United Arab Emirates	WTA 1000	Hard	2R	10	120	Third round lost to (Denmark) Clara Tauson; 3–6, 2–6
5 March 2025 – 16 March 2025	Indian Wells Open	United States	WTA 1000	Hard	4R	120	650	Final lost to Mirra Andreeva; 6–2, 4–6, 3–6
18 March 2025 – 30 March 2025	Miami Open	United States	WTA 1000	Hard	3R	65	1000	Winner defeated (United States) Jessica Pegula; 7–5, 6–2
14 April 2025 – 21 April 2025	Stuttgart Open	Germany	WTA 500	Clay (i)	QF	108	325	Final lost to (Latvia) Jeļena Ostapenko; 4–6, 1–6
22 April 2025 – 4 May 2025	Madrid Open	Spain	WTA 1000	Clay	F	650	1000	Winner defeated (United States) Coco Gauff; 6–3, 7–6^{(7–3)}
7 May 2025 – 18 May 2025	Italian Open	Italy	WTA 1000	Clay	F	650	215	Quarterfinals lost to (China) Zheng Qinwen; 4–6, 3–6
26 May 2025 – 9 June 2025	French Open	France	Grand Slam	Clay	QF	430	1300	Final lost to (United States) Coco Gauff; 7–6^{(7–5)}, 2–6, 4–6
16 June 2025 – 22 June 2025	German Open	Germany	WTA 500	Grass	QF	108	195	Semifinals lost to (Czech Republic) Markéta Vondroušová; 2–6, 4–6
30 June 2025 – 13 July 2025	Wimbledon Championships	United Kingdom	Grand Slam	Grass	A	0	780	Semifinals lost to (United States) Amanda Anisimova; 4–6, 6–4, 4–6
27 July 2025 – 7 August 2025	Canadian Open	Canada	WTA 1000	Hard	QF	215	0	Withdrew
7 August 2025 – 18 August 2025	Cincinnati Open	United States	WTA 1000	Hard	W	1000	215	Quarterfinals lost to (Kazakhstan) Elena Rybakina; 1–6, 4–6
24 August 2025 – 7 September 2025	US Open	United States	Grand Slam	Hard	W	2000	2000	Winner defeated (United States) Amanda Anisimova; 6–3, 7–6^{(7–3)}
24 September 2025 – 5 October 2025	China Open	China	WTA 1000	Hard	QF	215	0	Withdrew
6 October 2025 – 12 October 2025	Wuhan Open	China	WTA 1000	Hard	W	1000	390	Semifinals lost to (United States) Jessica Pegula; 6–2, 4–6, 6–7^{(2–7)}
1 November 2025 – 8 November 2025	WTA Finals	Saudi Arabia	WTA Finals	Hard	SF	400	1000	Final lost to (Kazakhstan) Elena Rybakina; 3–6, 6–7^{(0–7)}
Total year-end points						9416	10870	▲1454

== Yearly records ==
=== Head-to-head match-ups ===
Sabalenka has a 63–12 (84%) WTA match win–loss record in the 2025 season. Her record against players who were part of the WTA rankings top ten at the time of their meetings is 15–5 (75%). Bold indicates player was ranked top 10 at the time of at least one meeting. The following list is ordered by number of wins:

- (Belgium) Elise Mertens 3–0
- (Italy) **Jasmine Paolini** 3–0
- (United States) **Amanda Anisimova** 3–1
- (United States) **Jessica Pegula** 3–1
- (Spain) Jéssica Bouzas Maneiro 2–0
- (Czech Republic) Marie Bouzková 2–0
- (Ukraine) Marta Kostyuk 2–0
- Polina Kudermetova 2–0
- (Switzerland) Rebeka Masarova 2–0
- (United Kingdom) Emma Raducanu 2–0
- Liudmila Samsonova 2–0
- Mirra Andreeva 2–1
- (United States) **Coco Gauff** 2–1
- (China) **Zheng Qinwen** 2–1
- (Kazakhstan) **Elena Rybakina** 2–2
- (Spain) Paula Badosa 1–0
- Anna Blinkova 1–0
- (Canada) Carson Branstine 1–0
- (Italy) Lucia Bronzetti 1–0
- (Spain) Cristina Bucșa 1–0
- (United States) Danielle Collins 1–0
- (Serbia) Olga Danilović 1–0
- (Canada) Leylah Fernandez 1–0
- (United Kingdom) Sonay Kartal 1–0
- (United States) Sofia Kenin 1–0
- (United States) McCartney Kessler 1–0
- Veronika Kudermetova 1–0
- Anastasia Pavlyuchenkova 1–0
- Anastasia Potapova 1–0
- (Kazakhstan) Yulia Putintseva 1–0
- Kamilla Rakhimova 1–0
- (Romania) Elena-Gabriela Ruse 1–0
- (Germany) Laura Siegemund 1–0
- (Slovakia) Rebecca Šramková 1–0
- (United States) Peyton Stearns 1–0
- (United States) Sloane Stephens 1–0
- (Ukraine) Elina Svitolina 1–0
- (Poland) **Iga Świątek** 1–0
- (Switzerland) Jil Teichmann 1–0
- (Bulgaria) Viktoriya Tomova 1–0
- (Mexico) Renata Zarazúa 1–0
- (United States) **Madison Keys** 1–1
- (Denmark) Clara Tauson 1–1
- (Czech Republic) Markéta Vondroušová 1–1
- Ekaterina Alexandrova 0–1
- (Latvia) Jeļena Ostapenko 0–1

=== Top 10 record ===
Result	W–L	Opponent	Rk	Tournament	Surface	Rd	Score	Rk	Ref
Win	1–0	(United States) Madison Keys	5	Indian Wells Open, United States	Hard	SF	6–0, 6–1	1	
Win	2–0	(China) Zheng Qinwen	9	Miami Open, United States	Hard	QF	6–2, 7–5	1	
Win	3–0	(Italy) Jasmine Paolini	7	Miami Open, United States	Hard	SF	6–2, 6–2	1	
Win	4–0	(United States) Jessica Pegula	4	Miami Open, United States	Hard	F	7–5, 6–2	1	
Win	5–0	(Italy) Jasmine Paolini	6	Stuttgart Open, Germany	Clay (i)	SF	7–5, 6–4	1	
Win	6–0	(United States) Coco Gauff	4	Madrid Open, Spain	Clay	F	6–3, 7–6^{(7–3)}	1	
Loss	6–1	(China) Zheng Qinwen	8	Italian Open, Italy	Clay	QF	4–6, 3–6	1	
Win	7–1	(China) Zheng Qinwen	7	French Open, France	Clay	QF	7–6^{(7–3)}, 6–3	1	
Win	8–1	(Poland) Iga Świątek	5	French Open, France	Clay	SF	7–6^{(7–1)}, 4–6, 6–0	1	
Loss	8–2	(United States) Coco Gauff	2	French Open, France	Clay	F	7–6^{(7–5)}, 2–6, 4–6	1	
Loss	8–3	(Kazakhstan) Elena Rybakina	10	Cincinnati Open, United States	Hard	QF	1–6, 4–6	1	
Win	9–3	(United States) Jessica Pegula	4	US Open, United States	Hard	SF	4–6, 6–3, 6–4	1	
Win	10–3	(United States) Amanda Anisimova	9	US Open, United States	Hard	F	6–3, 7–6^{(7–3)}	1	
Win	11–3	(Kazakhstan) Elena Rybakina	9	Wuhan Open, China	Hard	QF	6–3, 6–3	1	
Loss	11–4	(United States) Jessica Pegula	6	Wuhan Open, China	Hard	SF	6–2, 4–6, 6–7^{(2–7)}	1	
Win	12–4	(Italy) Jasmine Paolini	8	WTA Finals, Saudi Arabia	Hard (i)	RR	6–3, 6–1	1	
Win	13–4	(United States) Jessica Pegula	5	WTA Finals, Saudi Arabia	Hard (i)	RR	6–4, 2–6, 6–3	1	
Win	14–4	(United States) Coco Gauff	3	WTA Finals, Saudi Arabia	Hard (i)	RR	7–6^{(7–5)}, 6–2	1	
Win	15–4	(United States) Amanda Anisimova	4	WTA Finals, Saudi Arabia	Hard (i)	SF	6–3, 3–6, 6–3	1	
Loss	15–5	(Kazakhstan) Elena Rybakina	6	WTA Finals, Saudi Arabia	Hard (i)	F	3–6, 6–7^{(0–7)}	1	

- Key: (Rk) first use, opponent rank; (Rd) round; (Rk) 2nd use, player rank; (Ref) reference; (F) final; (SF) semifinal; (QF) quarterfinal; (#R) rounds 4, 3, 2, 1; (RR) round-robin stage; (Q#) qualifying rounds or stages (3), 2, 1.

=== Finals ===
==== Singles: 9 (4 titles, 5 runner-ups) ====
Legend Grand Slam tournaments (1–2) WTA Tour Championships (0–1) WTA 1000 (2–1) WTA 500 (1–1)	Finals by surface Hard (3–3) Clay (1–2)	Finals by setting Outdoor (4–3) Indoor (0–2)

Result	W–L	Date	Tournament	Tier	Surface	Opponent	Score
Win	1–0	Jan 2025	Brisbane International, Australia	WTA 500	Hard	Polina Kudermetova	4–6, 6–3, 6–2
Loss	1–1	Jan 2025	Australian Open, Australia	Grand Slam	Hard	(United States) Madison Keys	3–6, 6–2, 5–7
Loss	1–2	Mar 2025	Indian Wells Open, United States	WTA 1000	Hard	Mirra Andreeva	6–2, 4–6, 3–6
Win	2–2	Mar 2025	Miami Open, United States	WTA 1000	Hard	(United States) Jessica Pegula	7–5, 6–2
Loss	2–3	Apr 2025	Stuttgart Open, Germany	WTA 500	Clay (i)	(Latvia) Jeļena Ostapenko	4–6, 1–6
Win	3–3	May 2025	Madrid Open, Spain	WTA 1000	Clay	(United States) Coco Gauff	6–3, 7–6^{(7–3)}
Loss	3–4	Jun 2025	French Open, France	Grand Slam	Clay	(United States) Coco Gauff	7–6^{(7–5)}, 2–6, 4–6
Win	4–4	Sep 2025	US Open, United States	Grand Slam	Hard	(United States) Amanda Anisimova	6–3, 7–6^{(7–3)}
Loss	4–5	Nov 2025	WTA Finals, Saudi Arabia	WTA Finals	Hard (i)	(Kazakhstan) Elena Rybakina	3–6, 6–7^{(0–7)}

=== Earnings ===
- **Bold** font denotes tournament win

**Singles**
Event	Prize money	Year-to-date
**Brisbane International**	**$192,475**	$192,475
Australian Open	A$1,900,000	$1,391,705
Qatar Open	$23,500	$1,415,205
Dubai Tennis Championships	$41,600	$1,456,805
Indian Wells Open	$599,625	$2,056,430
**Miami Open**	**$1,124,380**	$3,180,810
Stuttgart Open	$87,825	$3,268,635
**Madrid Open**	**€985,030**	$4,381,852
Italian Open	€124,700	$4,536,415
French Open	€1,275,000	$5,916,888
German Open	$59,100	$5,975,988
Wimbledon Championships	£775,000	$7,026,519
Cincinnati Open	$106,900	$7,133,419
**US Open**	**$5,000,000**	$12,133,419
Wuhan Open	$180,100	$12,313,519
WTA Finals	$2,695,000	$15,008,519
		$15,008,519
**Total**
		**$15,008,519**

Figures in United States dollars (USD) unless noted.

== See also ==
- 2025 Coco Gauff tennis season
- 2025 Madison Keys tennis season
- 2025 Iga Świątek tennis season
- 2025 Elena Rybakina tennis season
