= 2025 Miami Open – Women's doubles =

Women's doubles
- 2025 Miami Open

Final
- Champions: Mirra Andreeva; Diana Shnaider
- Runners-up: (Spain) Cristina Bucșa (Japan) Miyu Kato
- Score: 6–3, 6–7^{(5–7)}, [10–2]

Events
Singles	men	women
Doubles	men	women
- Miami Open

Mirra Andreeva and Diana Shnaider defeated Cristina Bucșa and Miyu Kato in the final, 6–3, 6–7^{(5–7)}, [10–2] to win the women's doubles tennis title at the 2025 Miami Open. It was the first WTA 1000 doubles title and second WTA Tour doubles title for both players.

Sofia Kenin and Bethanie Mattek-Sands were the reigning champions, but chose not to compete together this year. Kenin partnered Lyudmyla Kichenok, but lost in the second round to Caroline Dolehide and Storm Hunter. Mattek-Sands partnered Marie Bouzková, but lost in the first round to Anna Kalinskaya and Caty McNally.

== Seeds ==
1. (Czech Republic) Kateřina Siniaková / (United States) Taylor Townsend (semifinals)
2. (Canada) Gabriela Dabrowski / (New Zealand) Erin Routliffe (first round)
3. (Italy) Sara Errani / (Italy) Jasmine Paolini (second round)
4. (Latvia) Jeļena Ostapenko / (Australia) Ellen Perez (first round)
5. (Chinese Taipei) Chan Hao-ching / Veronika Kudermetova (first round)
6. (Kazakhstan) Anna Danilina / Irina Khromacheva (first round)
7. (Belgium) Elise Mertens / (China) Zhang Shuai (quarterfinals)
8. (United States) Sofia Kenin / (Ukraine) Lyudmyla Kichenok (second round)

== Draw ==
Key

- Q = Qualifier
- WC = Wild card
- LL = Lucky loser
- Alt = Alternate
- ITF = ITF entry
- PR = Protected ranking
- SR = Special ranking
- SE = Special exempt
- JE = Junior exempt
- JR = Junior Accelerator Programme entrant
- CO = College Accelerator Programme entrant
- NG = Next Gen Accelerator Program entrant
- w/o = Walkover
- r = Retired
- d = Defaulted

=== Finals ===
Semifinals
1	(Czech Republic) Kateřina Siniaková (United States) Taylor Townsend	6	5	[2]
(Spain) Cristina Bucșa (Japan) Miyu Kato	2	7	[10]
Mirra Andreeva; Diana Shnaider	6	7
(China) Jiang Xinyu (Chinese Taipei) Wu Fang-hsien	0	5

Final
(Spain) Cristina Bucșa (Japan) Miyu Kato	3	7^{7}	[2]
Mirra Andreeva; Diana Shnaider	6	6^{5}	[10]

=== Top half ===
First round
1	(Czech Republic) K Siniaková (United States) T Townsend	6	6
A Panova (Hungary) F Stollár	2	1
(Czech Republic) M Bouzková (United States) B Mattek-Sands	2	2
PR	A Kalinskaya (United States) C McNally	6	6
PR	(United States) C Dolehide (Australia) S Hunter	6	6
Alt	(Poland) M Linette (Ukraine) D Yastremska	1	1
(Canada) L Fernandez (United States) N Melichar-Martinez	2	6^{6}
8	(United States) S Kenin (Ukraine) L Kichenok	6	7^{8}
3	(Italy) S Errani (Italy) J Paolini	6	5	[12]
(Ukraine) N Kichenok (Indonesia) A Sutjiadi	1	7	[10]
(Spain) C Bucșa (Japan) M Kato	6	6
Alt	(United States) Q Gleason (Brazil) I Martins	3	4
(Hungary) T Babos (Brazil) L Stefani	6	6
(Norway) U Eikeri (Mexico) G Olmos	3	4
(Romania) M Niculescu (Poland) K Piter	6	3	[7]
7	(Belgium) E Mertens (China) S Zhang	4	6	[10]

Second round
1	(Czech Republic) K Siniaková (United States) T Townsend	6	6
PR	A Kalinskaya (United States) C McNally	4	2
PR	(United States) C Dolehide (Australia) S Hunter	6	6
8	(United States) S Kenin (Ukraine) L Kichenok	4	4
3	(Italy) S Errani (Italy) J Paolini	6^{4}	2
(Spain) C Bucșa (Japan) M Kato	7^{7}	6
(Hungary) T Babos (Brazil) L Stefani	3	1
7	(Belgium) E Mertens (China) S Zhang	6	6

Quarterfinals
1	(Czech Republic) K Siniaková (United States) T Townsend	7	6
PR	(United States) C Dolehide (Australia) S Hunter	5	2
(Spain) C Bucșa (Japan) M Kato	4	7	[10]
7	(Belgium) E Mertens (China) S Zhang	6	5	[8]

Semifinals
1	(Czech Republic) K Siniaková (United States) T Townsend	6	5	[2]
(Spain) C Bucșa (Japan) M Kato	2	7	[10]

=== Bottom half ===
First round
5	(Chinese Taipei) H-c Chan; V Kudermetova	5	4
WC	(China) Y Xu (China) Z Yang	7	6
M Andreeva; D Shnaider	6^{7}	6	[10]
WC	(United States) M Kessler (United States) R Montgomery	7^{9}	4	[5]
(Slovakia) T Mihalíková (United Kingdom) O Nicholls	6	6
(Czech Republic) L Nosková (Denmark) C Tauson	2	4
Alt	E Alexandrova (United States) P Stearns	4	6	[10]
4	(Latvia) J Ostapenko (Australia) E Perez	6	2	[7]
6	(Kazakhstan) A Danilina; I Khromacheva	6	3	[7]
(United States) A Krueger (United States) J Pegula	2	6	[10]
(China) X Jiang (Chinese Taipei) F-h Wu	6	7
(United States) A Muhammad (Netherlands) D Schuurs	3	5
(Japan) S Aoyama (Japan) E Hozumi	2	5
(United States) D Collins (United States) D Krawczyk	6	7
(China) Xin Wang (China) S Zheng	6	7^{8}
2	(Canada) G Dabrowski (New Zealand) E Routliffe	4	6^{6}

Second round
WC	(China) Y Xu (China) Z Yang	1	2
M Andreeva; D Shnaider	6	6
(Slovakia) T Mihalíková (United Kingdom) O Nicholls	4	3
Alt	E Alexandrova (United States) P Stearns	6	6
(United States) A Krueger (United States) J Pegula	3^{r}
(China) X Jiang (Chinese Taipei) F-h Wu	1
(United States) D Collins (United States) D Krawczyk	3	3
(China) Xin Wang (China) S Zheng	6	6

Quarterfinals
M Andreeva; D Shnaider	5	6	[10]
Alt	E Alexandrova (United States) P Stearns	7	3	[4]
(China) X Jiang (Chinese Taipei) F-h Wu	6	6
(China) Xin Wang (China) S Zheng	3	4

Semifinals
M Andreeva; D Shnaider	6	7
(China) X Jiang (Chinese Taipei) F-h Wu	0	5

== Seeded teams ==
The following are the seeded teams. Seedings are based on WTA rankings as of 3 March 2025.

Country	Player	Country	Player	Rank	Seed
CZE	Kateřina Siniaková	USA	Taylor Townsend	3	1
CAN	Gabriela Dabrowski	NZL	Erin Routliffe	7	2
ITA	Sara Errani	ITA	Jasmine Paolini	13	3
LAT	Jeļena Ostapenko	AUS	Ellen Perez	21	4
TPE	Chan Hao-ching		Veronika Kudermetova	23	5
KAZ	Anna Danilina		Irina Khromacheva	31	6
BEL	Elise Mertens	CHN	Zhang Shuai	33	7
USA	Sofia Kenin	UKR	Lyudmyla Kichenok	37	8

== Other entry information ==
=== Wildcards ===
- (United States) McCartney Kessler / (United States) Robin Montgomery
- ~~(Ukraine) Marta Kostyuk / (Romania) Elena-Gabriela Ruse~~
- (China) Xu Yifan / (China) Yang Zhaoxuan

=== Protected ranking ===
- (United States) Caroline Dolehide / (Australia) Storm Hunter
- Anna Kalinskaya / (United States) Caty McNally

=== Alternates ===
- Ekaterina Alexandrova / (United States) Peyton Stearns
- (United States) Quinn Gleason / (Brazil) Ingrid Martins
- (Poland) Magda Linette / (Ukraine) Dayana Yastremska

=== Withdrawals ===
- (Brazil) Beatriz Haddad Maia / (Germany) Laura Siegemund → replaced by (Poland) Magda Linette / (Ukraine) Dayana Yastremska
- (Ukraine) Marta Kostyuk / (Romania) Elena-Gabriela Ruse → replaced by (United States) Quinn Gleason / (Brazil) Ingrid Martins
- Anastasia Potapova / (Kazakhstan) Yulia Putintseva → replaced by Ekaterina Alexandrova / (United States) Peyton Stearns
