= 2025 National Bank Open – Women's doubles =

Women's doubles
- 2025 National Bank Open

Final
- Champions: (United States) Coco Gauff (United States) McCartney Kessler
- Runners-up: (United States) Taylor Townsend (China) Zhang Shuai
- Score: 6–4, 1–6, [13–11]

Details
- Draw: 32
- Seeds: 8

Events
Singles	men	women
Doubles	men	women
- National Bank Open

Coco Gauff and McCartney Kessler defeated Taylor Townsend and Zhang Shuai in the final, 6–4, 1–6, [13–11] to win the women's doubles tennis title at the 2025 Canadian Open.

Caroline Dolehide and Desirae Krawczyk were the defending champions, but chose not to compete together. Dolehide partnered Sofia Kenin, but lost in the semifinals to Townsend and Zhang. Krawczyk partnered Giuliana Olmos, but lost in the first round to Maya Joint and Caty McNally.

Townsend retained the WTA No. 1 doubles ranking after Jeļena Ostapenko lost in the quarterfinals. Kateřina Siniaková was also in contention at the beginning of the tournament.

== Seeds ==
1. (Italy) Sara Errani / (Italy) Jasmine Paolini (second round)
2. (Canada) Gabriela Dabrowski / (New Zealand) Erin Routliffe (first round)
3. (United States) Taylor Townsend / (China) Zhang Shuai (final)
4. Veronika Kudermetova / (Belgium) Elise Mertens (second round)
5. Mirra Andreeva / Diana Shnaider (first round)
6. (United States) Asia Muhammad / (Netherlands) Demi Schuurs (first round)
7. (Ukraine) Lyudmyla Kichenok / (Australia) Ellen Perez (second round)
8. (Hungary) Tímea Babos / (Brazil) Luisa Stefani (second round)

== Draw ==
Key

- Q = Qualifier
- WC = Wild card
- LL = Lucky loser
- Alt = Alternate
- ITF = ITF entry
- PR = Protected ranking
- SR = Special ranking
- SE = Special exempt
- JE = Junior exempt
- JR = Junior Accelerator Programme entrant
- CO = College Accelerator Programme entrant
- NG = Next Gen Accelerator Program entrant
- w/o = Walkover
- r = Retired
- d = Defaulted

=== Finals ===
Semifinals
(United States) Coco Gauff (United States) McCartney Kessler	5	6	[10]
(Serbia) Olga Danilović (Chinese Taipei) Hsieh Su-wei	7	4	[6]
3	(United States) Taylor Townsend (China) Zhang Shuai	6	6
(United States) Caroline Dolehide (United States) Sofia Kenin	2	4

Final
(United States) Coco Gauff (United States) McCartney Kessler	6	1	[13]
3	(United States) Taylor Townsend (China) Zhang Shuai	4	6	[11]

=== Top half ===
First round
1	(Italy) S Errani (Italy) J Paolini	6	6
WC	(Canada) B Fernandez (Canada) L Fernandez	4	2
PR	(Czech Republic) B Krejčíková (Latvia) J Ostapenko	6	7^{8}
(Slovakia) T Mihalíková (United Kingdom) O Nicholls	3	6^{6}
(Hungary) F Stollár (Chinese Taipei) F-h Wu	6^{6}	4
(United States) C Gauff (United States) M Kessler	7^{8}	6
(United States) N Melichar-Martinez; L Samsonova	5	1
7	(Ukraine) L Kichenok (Australia) E Perez	7	6
4	V Kudermetova (Belgium) E Mertens	6	4	[10]
(Brazil) B Haddad Maia (Germany) L Siegemund	4	6	[8]
(Poland) K Piter (United States) S Santamaria	6^{5}	7^{7}	[5]
(China) H Guo; A Panova	7^{7}	6^{4}	[10]
WC	(United States) P Stearns (Czech Republic) M Vondroušová	3	6	[10]
(United States) M Keys (United States) J Pegula	6	2	[5]
(Serbia) O Danilović (Chinese Taipei) S-w Hsieh	7^{7}	6
5	M Andreeva; D Shnaider	6^{4}	4

Second round
1	(Italy) S Errani (Italy) J Paolini	6^{3}	2
PR	(Czech Republic) B Krejčíková (Latvia) J Ostapenko	7^{7}	6
(United States) C Gauff (United States) M Kessler	6	4	[10]
7	(Ukraine) L Kichenok (Australia) E Perez	3	6	[1]
4	V Kudermetova (Belgium) E Mertens	5	3
(China) H Guo; A Panova	7	6
WC	(United States) P Stearns (Czech Republic) M Vondroušová	4	2
(Serbia) O Danilović (Chinese Taipei) S-w Hsieh	6	6

Quarterfinals
PR	(Czech Republic) B Krejčíková (Latvia) J Ostapenko	4	6	[7]
(United States) C Gauff (United States) M Kessler	6	3	[10]
(China) H Guo; A Panova	2	7^{7}	[5]
(Serbia) O Danilović (Chinese Taipei) S-w Hsieh	6	6^{5}	[10]

Semifinals
(United States) C Gauff (United States) M Kessler	5	6	[10]
(Serbia) O Danilović (Chinese Taipei) S-w Hsieh	7	4	[6]

=== Bottom half ===
First round
8	(Hungary) T Babos (Brazil) L Stefani	6	3	[10]
PR	(China) Y Xu (China) Z Yang	4	6	[2]
WC	(Canada) K Cross (Canada) V Mboko	3	6^{0}
(Chinese Taipei) H-c Chan (China) X Jiang	6	7^{7}
(Kazakhstan) A Danilina (Serbia) A Krunić	6	6
(Australia) D Kasatkina (Czech Republic) L Nosková	4	0
I Khromacheva (Indonesia) A Sutjiadi	6^{5}	5
3	(United States) T Townsend (China) S Zhang	7^{7}	7
6	(United States) A Muhammad (Netherlands) D Schuurs	6^{8}	4
(Japan) S Aoyama (Spain) C Bucșa	7^{10}	6
PR	(Australia) M Joint (United States) C McNally	4	7	[11]
(United States) D Krawczyk (Mexico) G Olmos	6	5	[9]
PR	K Rakhimova (Kazakhstan) G Voskoboeva	6	6
(Norway) U Eikeri (Japan) E Hozumi	2	4
(United States) C Dolehide (United States) S Kenin	7^{7}	3	[10]
2	(Canada) G Dabrowski (New Zealand) E Routliffe	6^{5}	6	[7]

Second round
8	(Hungary) T Babos (Brazil) L Stefani	6^{6}	7	[6]
(Chinese Taipei) H-c Chan (China) X Jiang	7^{8}	5	[10]
(Kazakhstan) A Danilina (Serbia) A Krunić	7^{7}	6^{5}	[4]
3	(United States) T Townsend (China) S Zhang	6^{5}	7^{7}	[10]
(Japan) S Aoyama (Spain) C Bucșa	6	4	[10]
PR	(Australia) M Joint (United States) C McNally	2	6	[6]
PR	K Rakhimova (Kazakhstan) G Voskoboeva	3	4
(United States) C Dolehide (United States) S Kenin	6	6

Quarterfinals
(Chinese Taipei) H-c Chan (China) X Jiang	2	0
3	(United States) T Townsend (China) S Zhang	6	6
(Japan) S Aoyama (Spain) C Bucșa	6	5	[5]
(United States) C Dolehide (United States) S Kenin	3	7	[10]

Semifinals
3	(United States) T Townsend (China) S Zhang	6	6
(United States) C Dolehide (United States) S Kenin	2	4

== Seeded teams ==
The following are the seeded teams. Seedings are based on WTA rankings as of 21 July 2025.

Country	Player	Country	Player	Rank	Seed
ITA	Sara Errani	ITA	Jasmine Paolini	12	1
CAN	Gabriela Dabrowski	NZL	Erin Routliffe	12	2
USA	Taylor Townsend	CHN	Zhang Shuai	17	3
	Veronika Kudermetova	BEL	Elise Mertens	18	4
	Mirra Andreeva		Diana Shnaider	23	5
USA	Asia Muhammad	NED	Demi Schuurs	29	6
UKR	Lyudmyla Kichenok	AUS	Ellen Perez	35	7
HUN	Tímea Babos	BRA	Luisa Stefani	45	8

== Other entry information ==
=== Wildcards ===
- (Canada) Kayla Cross / (Canada) Victoria Mboko
- (Canada) Bianca Fernandez / (Canada) Leylah Fernandez
- (United States) Peyton Stearns / (Czech Republic) Markéta Vondroušová

=== Protected ranking ===
- (Australia) Maya Joint / (United States) Caty McNally
- (Czech Republic) Barbora Krejčiková / (Latvia) Jeļena Ostapenko
- Kamilla Rakhimova / (Kazakhstan) Galina Voskoboeva
- (China) Xu Yifan / (China) Yang Zhaoxuan
