= 2025 National Bank Open =

Canadian tennis tournament

- Date: 26 July–7 August 2025
- Edition: 135th (men) / 123rd (women)
- Category: ATP Tour Masters 1000 (men); WTA 1000 (women)
- Draw: 96S / 32D
- Prize money: $9,193,540 (men) $5,152,599 (women)
- Surface: Hard / outdoor
- Location: Toronto, Ontario, Canada (men); Montreal, Quebec, Canada (women)

Champions

Men's singles
- (United States) Ben Shelton

Women's singles
- (Canada) Victoria Mboko

Men's doubles
- (United Kingdom) Julian Cash / (United Kingdom) Lloyd Glasspool

Women's doubles
- (United States) Coco Gauff / (United States) McCartney Kessler
- Canadian Open (tennis)

The 2025 Canadian Open, branded as the 2025 National Bank Open presented by Rogers for sponsorship reasons, was a combined men's and women's tennis tournament played on outdoor hardcourts from July 26 to August 7, 2025.

The men's event took place at Sobeys Stadium in Toronto and the women's event took place at IGA Stadium in Montreal. It was the 135th edition of the men's tournament—a mandatory Masters 1000 event on the 2025 ATP Tour, and the 123rd edition of the women's tournament—a mandatory WTA 1000 event on the 2025 WTA Tour. This was the first year the tournament was expanded from 56 to 96 singles players.

== Champions ==
=== Men's singles ===
- (United States) Ben Shelton def. Karen Khachanov, 6–7^{(5–7)}, 6–4, 7–6^{(7–3)}

=== Women's singles ===
- (Canada) Victoria Mboko def. (Japan) Naomi Osaka, 2–6, 6–4, 6–2

=== Men's doubles ===
- (United Kingdom) Julian Cash / (United Kingdom) Lloyd Glasspool def. (United Kingdom) Joe Salisbury / (United Kingdom) Neal Skupski, 6–3, 6–7^{(5–7)}, [13–11]

=== Women's doubles ===
- (United States) Coco Gauff / (United States) McCartney Kessler def. (United States) Taylor Townsend / (China) Zhang Shuai, 6–4, 1–6, [13–11]

== Points and prize money ==
=== Point distribution ===
Event	W	F	SF	QF	R16	R32	R64	R128	Q	Q1
Men's singles	1000	650	400	200	100	50	30*	10**	20	0
Men's doubles	1000	600	360	180	90	0	—N/a	—N/a	—N/a	—N/a
Women's singles	1000	650	390	215	120	65	35*	10	30	2
Women's doubles	1000	650	390	215	120	10	—N/a	—N/a	—N/a	—N/a

* Players with byes receive first-round points.
** Singles players with wild cards earn 0 points.

=== Prize money ===
Event	W	F	SF	QF	Round of 16	Round of 32	Round of 64	Round of 128
Men's singles	$1,124,380	$597,890	$332,180	$189,075	$103,225	$60,400	$35,260	$23,760
Women's singles	$752,275	$391,600	$206,100	$107,000	$56,703	$33,000	$19,705	$12,770
Men's doubles*	$312,740	$169,880	$93,310	$51,470	$28,310	$13,510	—N/a	—N/a
Women's doubles*	$262,780	$139,120	$74,700	$37,360	$19,970	$10,950	—N/a	—N/a

_{*per team}
