= 2025 Miami Open =

- Date: March 18–30
- Edition: 40th
- Category: ATP Masters 1000 (ATP); WTA 1000 (WTA)
- Draw: 96S / 48Q / 32D
- Surface: Hard - outdoor
- Location: Miami Gardens, Florida, United States
- Venue: Hard Rock Stadium

Champions

Men's singles
- (Czech Republic) Jakub Menšík

Women's singles
- Aryna Sabalenka

Men's doubles
- (El Salvador) Marcelo Arévalo / (Croatia) Mate Pavić

Women's doubles
- Mirra Andreeva / Diana Shnaider
- Miami Open

The 2025 Miami Open was a professional hardcourt tennis tournament played from March 18 to March 30, 2025, on the grounds of Hard Rock Stadium in Miami Gardens, Florida. It was the 40th edition of the combined men's and women's event and was classified as an ATP Masters 1000 event on the 2025 ATP Tour and a WTA 1000 event on the 2025 WTA Tour.

Jannik Sinner and Danielle Collins were the reigning champions in the men's and women's singles draw, respectively. Sinner was not able to defend his title as he was serving a suspension following two positive doping tests at the 2024 Indian Wells Open, and Collins lost in the fourth round to Aryna Sabalenka.

== Champions ==
=== Men's singles ===
- (Czech Republic) Jakub Menšík def. (Serbia) Novak Djokovic, 7–6^{(7–4)}, 7–6^{(7–4)}

=== Women's singles ===
- Aryna Sabalenka def. (United States) Jessica Pegula, 7–5, 6–2

=== Men's doubles ===
- (El Salvador) Marcelo Arévalo / (Croatia) Mate Pavić def. (United Kingdom) Julian Cash / (United Kingdom) Lloyd Glasspool, 7–6^{(7–3)}, 6–3

=== Women's doubles ===
- Mirra Andreeva / Diana Shnaider def. (Spain) Cristina Bucșa / (Japan) Miyu Kato, 6–3, 6–7^{(5–7)}, [10–2]

== Points and prize money ==
=== Point distribution ===
Event	W	F	SF	QF	R16	R32	R64	R128	Q	Q2	Q1
Men's singles	1000	650	400	200	100	50	30*	10**	20	10	0
Men's doubles	1000	600	360	180	90	0	—N/a	—N/a	—N/a	—N/a	—N/a
Women's singles	1000	650	390	215	120	65	35*	10	30	20	2
Women's doubles	1000	650	390	215	120	10	—N/a	—N/a	—N/a	—N/a	—N/a

* Players with byes receive first-round points.
** Singles players with wild cards earn 0 points.

=== Prize money ===
Event	W	F	SF	QF	R16	R32	R64	R128	Q2	Q1
Men's singles	$1,124,380	$597,890	$332,160	$189,075	$103,225	$60,440	$35,260	$23,760	$13,795	$7,155
Women's singles	$1,124,380	$597,890	$332,160	$189,075	$103,225	$60,440	$35,260	$23,760	$13,795	$7,155
Men's doubles*	$457,150	$242,020	$129,970	$65,000	$34,850	$19,050	—N/a	—N/a	—N/a	—N/a
Women's doubles*	$457,150	$242,020	$129,970	$65,000	$34,850	$19,050	—N/a	—N/a	—N/a	—N/a

*per team

== See also ==
- 2025 ATP Tour
- 2025 WTA Tour
- ATP Tour Masters 1000
- WTA 1000 tournaments
