= 2025 Qatar TotalEnergies Open =

- Date: 9–15 February 2025
- Edition: 23rd
- Category: WTA 1000
- Draw: 56S / 28D
- Prize money: $3,654,963
- Surface: Hard / outdoor
- Location: Doha, Qatar
- Venue: Khalifa International Tennis and Squash Complex

Champions

Singles
- (United States) Amanda Anisimova

Doubles
- (Italy) Sara Errani / (Italy) Jasmine Paolini
← 2024 ·	WTA Qatar Open	· 2026 →

The 2025 Qatar TotalEnergies Open is a professional women's tennis tournament played on outdoor hard courts. It is the 23rd edition of the WTA Qatar Open, and a WTA 1000 tournament on the 2025 WTA Tour. It takes place at the International Tennis and Squash complex in Doha, Qatar, from 9 to 15 February 2025.

== Champions ==
=== Singles ===
- (United States) Amanda Anisimova def. (Latvia) Jeļena Ostapenko, 6–4, 6–3

=== Doubles ===
- (Italy) Sara Errani / (Italy) Jasmine Paolini def. (China) Jiang Xinyu / (Chinese Taipei) Wu Fang-hsien, 7–5, 7–6^{(12–10)}

== Points and prize money ==
=== Point distribution ===
Event	W	F	SF	QF	Round of 16	Round of 32	Round of 64	Q	Q2	Q1
Singles	1000	650	390	215	120	65*	10	30	20	2
Doubles	1000	650	390	215	120	10	—	—	—	—

=== Prize money ===
Event	W	F	SF	QF	R16	R32	R64	Q2	Q1
Singles	$597,000	$351,801	$181,400	$83,470	$41,600	$23,500	$16,900	$10,074	$5,270
Doubles**	$175,900	$98,950	$53,140	$27,480	$15,570	$10,380	—	—	—

* Players with byes receive first-round points.
** Per team.

== Doubles main-draw entrants ==
=== Seeds ===
Country	Player	Country	Player	Rank^{1}	Seed
CAN	Gabriela Dabrowski	NZL	Erin Routliffe	6	1
TPE	Hsieh Su-wei	LAT	Jeļena Ostapenko	13	2
ITA	Sara Errani	ITA	Jasmine Paolini	19	3
USA	Sofia Kenin	UKR	Lyudmyla Kichenok	27	4
TPE	Chan Hao-ching		Veronika Kudermetova	31	5
BEL	Elise Mertens	AUS	Ellen Perez	35	6
KAZ	Anna Danilina		Irina Khromacheva	36	7
USA	Asia Muhammad	NED	Demi Schuurs	38	8

- Rankings are as of 3 February 2025

=== Other entrants ===
The following pairs received a wildcard into the doubles main draw:

- (United States) Bethanie Mattek-Sands / (Czech Republic) Lucie Šafářová
- (United States) Peyton Stearns / (Brazil) Luisa Stefani
- (China) Wang Xinyu / (China) Zheng Saisai
