= 2025 Mutua Madrid Open =

- Date: 22 April − 4 May
- Edition: 23rd (men); 16th (women)
- Category: ATP Tour Masters 1000 (men); WTA 1000 (women)
- Draw: 96S / 32D
- Prize money: €8,055,385
- Surface: Clay / outdoor
- Location: Madrid, Spain
- Venue: Park Manzanares

Champions

Men's singles
- (Norway) Casper Ruud

Women's singles
- Aryna Sabalenka

Men's doubles
- (Spain) Marcel Granollers / (Argentina) Horacio Zeballos

Women's doubles
- (Romania) Sorana Cîrstea / Anna Kalinskaya
- Madrid Open

The 2025 Mutua Madrid Open was a professional tennis tournament played on outdoor clay courts at the Park Manzanares in Madrid, Spain from 22 April to 4 May 2025. It was the 23rd edition of the event on the ATP Tour and 16th on the WTA Tour. It is classified as an ATP 1000 event on the 2025 ATP Tour and a WTA 1000 event on the 2025 WTA Tour.

On 28 April, play was interrupted and eventually abandoned because of a widespread power outage in Spain and southern Europe.

== Champions ==
=== Men's singles ===
- (Norway) Casper Ruud def. (United Kingdom) Jack Draper, 7–5, 3–6, 6–4

=== Women's singles ===
- Aryna Sabalenka def. (United States) Coco Gauff, 6–3, 7–6^{(7–3)}

=== Men's doubles ===
- (Spain) Marcel Granollers / (Argentina) Horacio Zeballos def. (El Salvador) Marcelo Arévalo / (Croatia) Mate Pavić 6–4, 6–4

=== Women's doubles ===
- (Romania) Sorana Cîrstea / Anna Kalinskaya def. Veronika Kudermetova / (Belgium) Elise Mertens, 6–7^{(10–12)}, 6–2, [12–10]

== Point distribution ==
Event	W	F	SF	QF	R16	R32	R64	R128	Q	Q2	Q1
Men's singles	1000	650	400	200	100	50	30*	10	20	10	0
Men's doubles	1000	600	360	180	90	0	—N/a	—N/a	—N/a	—N/a	—N/a
Women's singles	1000	650	390	215	120	65	35*	10	30	20	2
Women's doubles	1000	650	390	215	120	10	—N/a	—N/a	—N/a	—N/a	—N/a

* Players with byes receive first-round points.

=== Prize money ===
Event	W	F	SF	QF	R16	R32	R64	R128	Q2	Q1
Men's singles	€985,030	€523,870	€291,040	€165,680	€90,445	€52,925	€30,895	€20,820	€12,090	€6,270
Women's singles	€985,030	€523,870	€291,040	€165,680	€90,445	€52,925	€30,895	€20,820	€12,090	€6,270
Men's doubles*	€400,560	€212,060	€113,880	€56,950	€30,540	€16,690	—N/a	—N/a	—N/a	—N/a
Women's doubles*	€400,560	€212,060	€113,880	€56,950	€30,540	€16,690	—N/a	—N/a	—N/a	—N/a

*per team
