= 2025 Porsche Tennis Grand Prix =

Women's tennis tournament

- Date: 14–21 April
- Edition: 47th
- Category: WTA 500
- Draw: 28S / 14D
- Prize money: € 925,661
- Surface: Clay (indoor)
- Location: Stuttgart, Germany
- Venue: Porsche-Arena

Champions

Singles
- (Latvia) Jeļena Ostapenko

Doubles
- (Canada) Gabriela Dabrowski / (New Zealand) Erin Routliffe
- Porsche Tennis Grand Prix

The 2025 Porsche Tennis Grand Prix was a women's professional tennis tournament played on indoor clay courts at the Porsche Arena in Stuttgart, Germany, from 14 April until 21 April 2025. It was the 47th edition of the Porsche Tennis Grand Prix and a WTA 500 tournament on the 2025 WTA Tour.

== Champions ==
=== Singles ===
- (Latvia) Jeļena Ostapenko def. Aryna Sabalenka, 6–4, 6–1

=== Doubles ===
- (Canada) Gabriela Dabrowski / (New Zealand) Erin Routliffe def. Ekaterina Alexandrova / (China) Zhang Shuai, 6–3, 6–3

== Point distribution ==
Event	W	F	SF	QF	R16	R32	Q	Q2	Q1
Singles	500	325	195	108	60	1	25	13	1
Doubles	500	325	195	108	1	—N/a	—N/a	—N/a	—N/a

=== Prize money ===
Event	W	F	SF	QF	Round of 16	Round of 32	Q2	Q1
Singles	$142,610	$87,825	$51,305	$27,040	$13,760	$9,828	$8,090	$4,860
Doubles	$47,220	$28,700	$16,660	$8,550	$5,750	—N/a	—N/a	—N/a
Doubles prize money per team

== Singles main draw entrants ==
=== Seeds ===
Country	Player	Rank	Seed
	Aryna Sabalenka	1	1
POL	Iga Świątek	2	2
USA	Jessica Pegula	3	3
USA	Coco Gauff	4	4
ITA	Jasmine Paolini	6	5
	Mirra Andreeva	7	6
USA	Emma Navarro	11	7
	Diana Shnaider	13	8

- Rankings are as of 7 April 2025.

=== Other entrants ===
The following players received wildcards into the main draw:

- (Germany) Eva Lys
- (Germany) Tatjana Maria
- (Germany) Jule Niemeier
- (Germany) Laura Siegemund

The following players received entry from the qualifying draw:

- (Croatia) Jana Fett
- Veronika Kudermetova
- Aliaksandra Sasnovich
- (Ukraine) Dayana Yastremska

The following players received entry as lucky losers:

- Erika Andreeva
- (Italy) Sara Errani
- (Germany) Ella Seidel

=== Withdrawals ===
- (Spain) Paula Badosa → replaced by Erika Andreeva
- (United States) Danielle Collins → replaced by (Germany) Ella Seidel
- (Czech Republic) Barbora Krejčíková → replaced by Anastasia Potapova
- (China) Zheng Qinwen → replaced by (Italy) Sara Errani

== Doubles main draw entrants ==
Country	Player	Country	Player	Rank	Seed
CAN	Gabriela Dabrowski	NZL	Erin Routliffe	8	1
ITA	Sara Errani	ITA	Jasmine Paolini	12	2
TPE	Chan Hao-ching		Veronika Kudermetova	29	3
USA	Asia Muhammad	NED	Demi Schuurs	34	4

- Rankings as of 7 April 2025.
