= 2025 WTA Finals =

- Date: 1–8 November
- Edition: 54th (singles) / 49th (doubles)
- Draw: 8S / 8D
- Prize money: $15,500,000
- Surface: Hard (indoor)
- Location: Riyadh, Saudi Arabia
- Venue: King Saud University Indoor Arena

Champions

Singles
- (Kazakhstan) Elena Rybakina

Doubles
- Veronika Kudermetova / (Belgium) Elise Mertens
- WTA Finals

The 2025 WTA Finals was a professional women's year-end championship tennis tournament that was organized from 1 to 8 November 2025 by the Women's Tennis Association (WTA). It was held in Riyadh, Saudi Arabia for the second straight year and was the 54th edition of the singles event and the 49th edition of the doubles competition. The tournament was contested by the eight highest-ranked singles players and doubles teams of the 2025 WTA Tour.

== Champions ==
=== Singles ===
- (Kazakhstan) Elena Rybakina def. Aryna Sabalenka, 6–3, 7–6^{(7–0)}

=== Doubles ===
- Veronika Kudermetova / (Belgium) Elise Mertens def. (Hungary) Tímea Babos / (Brazil) Luisa Stefani, 7–6^{(7–4)}, 6–1

== Tournament ==
=== Qualifying ===
Eight players/teams to compete in singles/doubles. To qualify, players/teams have to play a minimum of eight WTA 1000 or WTA 500 tournaments during the season. Players/teams are qualified in the following sequence:

1. Ranked top seven in the leaderboard;
2. The highest-ranked current-year Grand Slam winning player/team ranked from eighth to twentieth;
3. The second-highest-ranked current-year Grand Slam winning player/team ranked from eighth to twentieth, if one player/team ranked in the top seven withdraws;
4. The next player who is ranked eighth or below.

In the singles, point totals are calculated by combining point totals from eighteen tournaments (excluding ITF and WTA 125 tournaments). Of these eighteen tournaments, a player's results from the following events are included:

- The four Grand Slam events;
- Six best mandatory WTA 1000 tournaments from the following seven events: Indian Wells, Miami, Madrid, Rome, Toronto/Montreal, Cincinnati and Beijing;
- The best mandatory WTA 1000 tournament from the following three events: Doha, Dubai and Wuhan;
- The best seven results from any other mandatory WTA 1000, WTA 500 and WTA 250 tournaments.

In the doubles, point totals are calculated by any combination of twelve tournaments throughout the year. Unlike in the singles, this combination does not need to include results from the Grand Slams or WTA 1000 tournaments.

=== Format ===
Both the singles and doubles event features eight players/teams in a round-robin event, split into two groups of four.

Over the first six days of competition, each player/team meets the other three players/teams in her group, with the top two in each group advancing to the semifinals. The first-placed player/team in one group meets the second-placed player/team in the other group, and vice versa. The winners of each semifinal meet in the championship match.

=== Round robin tie-breaking methods ===
The final standings are made using these methods:

1. Greatest number of match wins
2. Greatest number of matches played
3. Head-to-head results if only two players are tied, or if three players are tied then:

a. If three players each have the same number of wins, a player having played less than all three matches is automatically eliminated and the player advancing to the single-elimination competition is the winner of the match-up of the two remaining tied players.
b. Highest percentage of sets won
c. Highest percentage of games won

== Prize money and points ==
The total prize money for the 2025 WTA Finals is US$15,250,000, an increase of 69.44% compared to the 2023 edition. The tables below break down the prize money, participation fees are prorated on a per match basis.

Stage	Prize money		Points
Stage	Singles	Doubles (Note: Prize money for doubles is per team.)	Points
Champion	RR (Note: RR means prize money or points won in the round-robin round.) + $3,770,000	RR + $775,000	RR + 900
Runner-up	RR + $1,270,000	RR + $255,000	RR + 400
Round robin win per match	+$350,000	+$70,000	200
Participation Fee	$335,000	$140,000	—N/a
Alternates	$250,000	$106,000	—N/a

- An undefeated champion would earn the maximum 1,500 points and $5,155,000 in singles or $1,125,000 in doubles.
- Participation fees are prorated on a per match basis. Singles: 1 match = $225,000 2 matches = $275,000 and 3 matches = $335,000. Doubles: 1 match = $94,000 2 matches = $116,000 and 3 matches = $140,000.
- Alternate fees are also prorated on a per-match basis. Singles: 0 matches = $140,000, 1 match = $200,000, 2 matches = $250,000. Doubles: 0 matches= $60,000, 1 match = $84,000, 2 matches= $106,000

== Qualified players ==
=== Singles ===
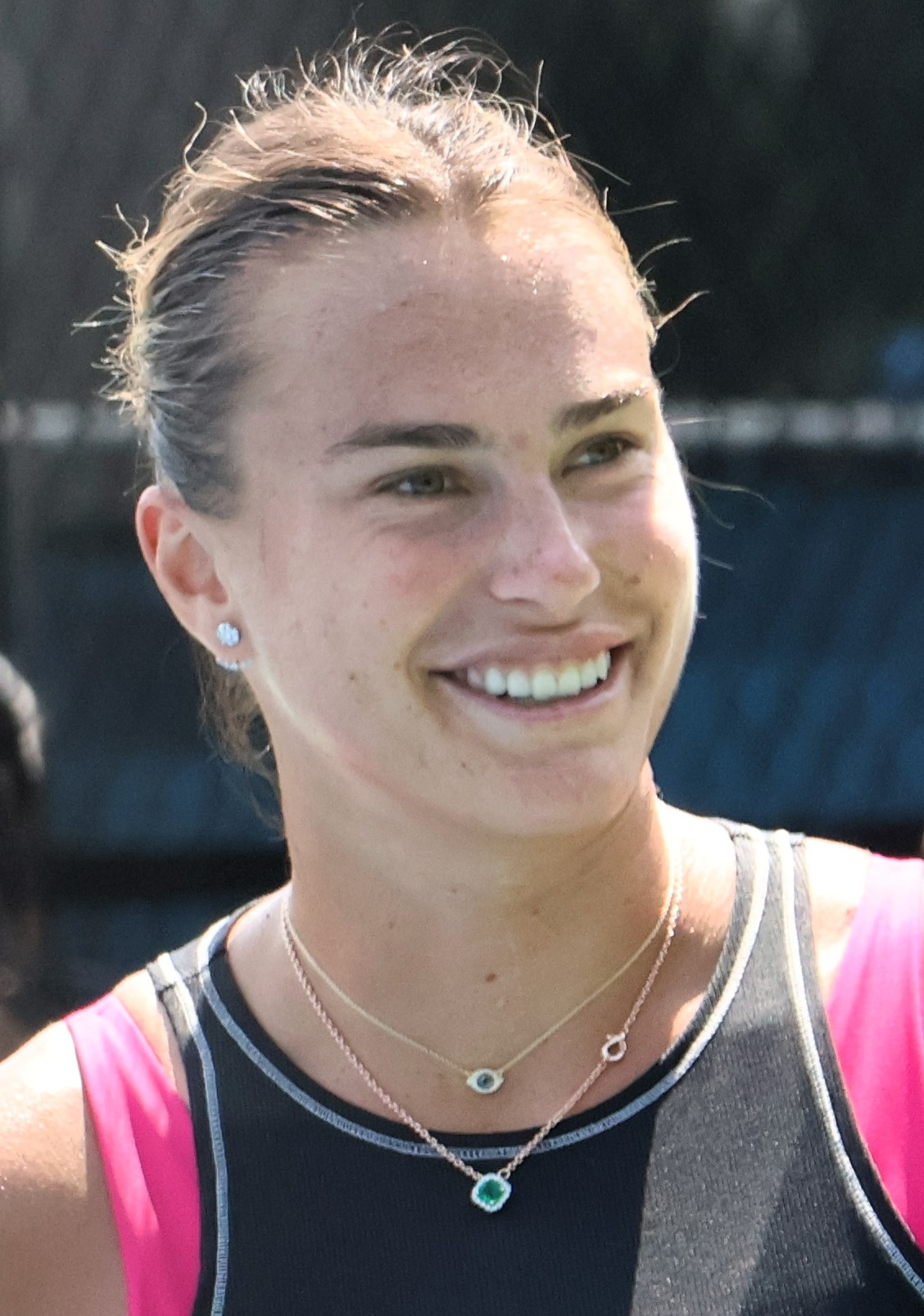
Sabalenka

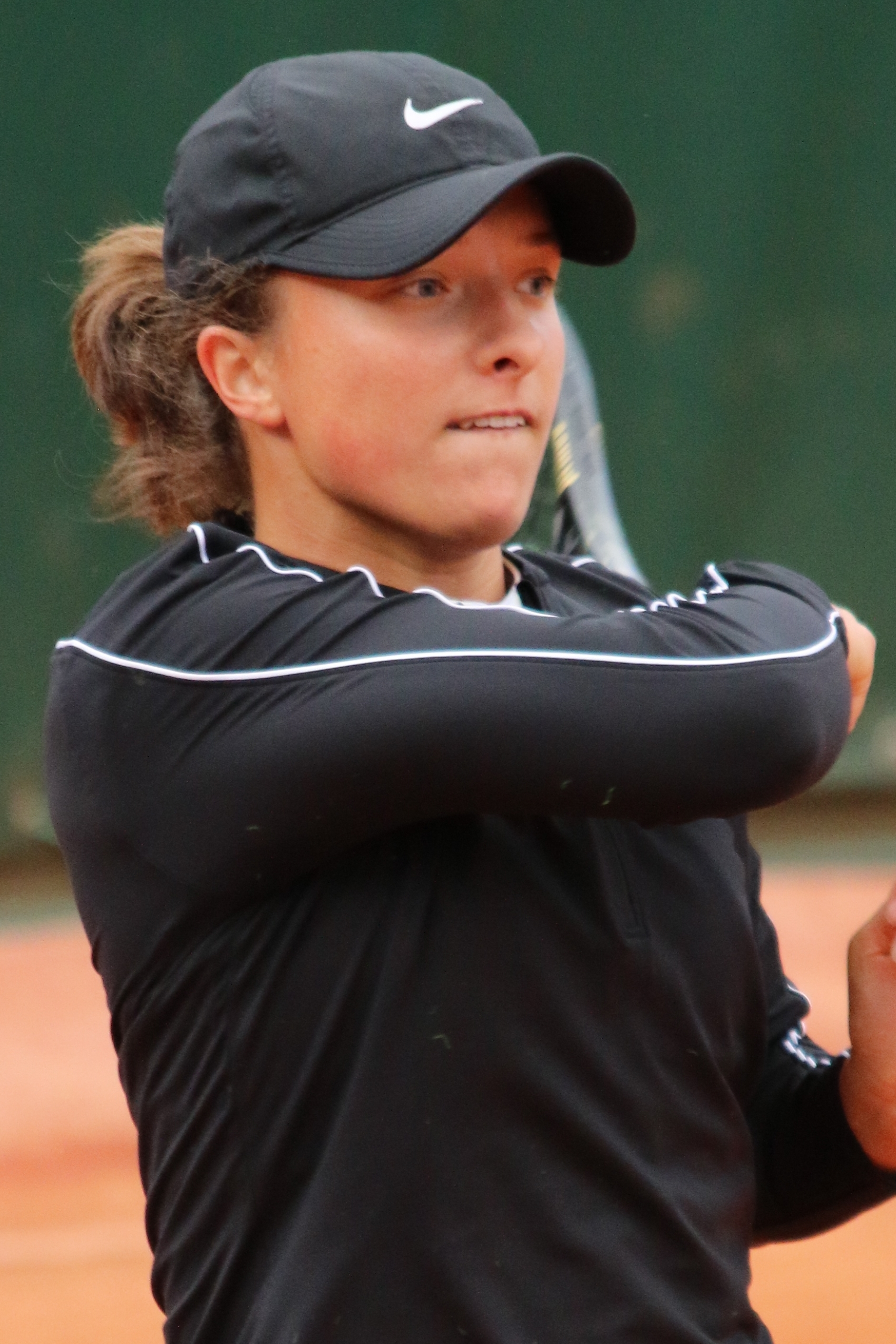
Świątek

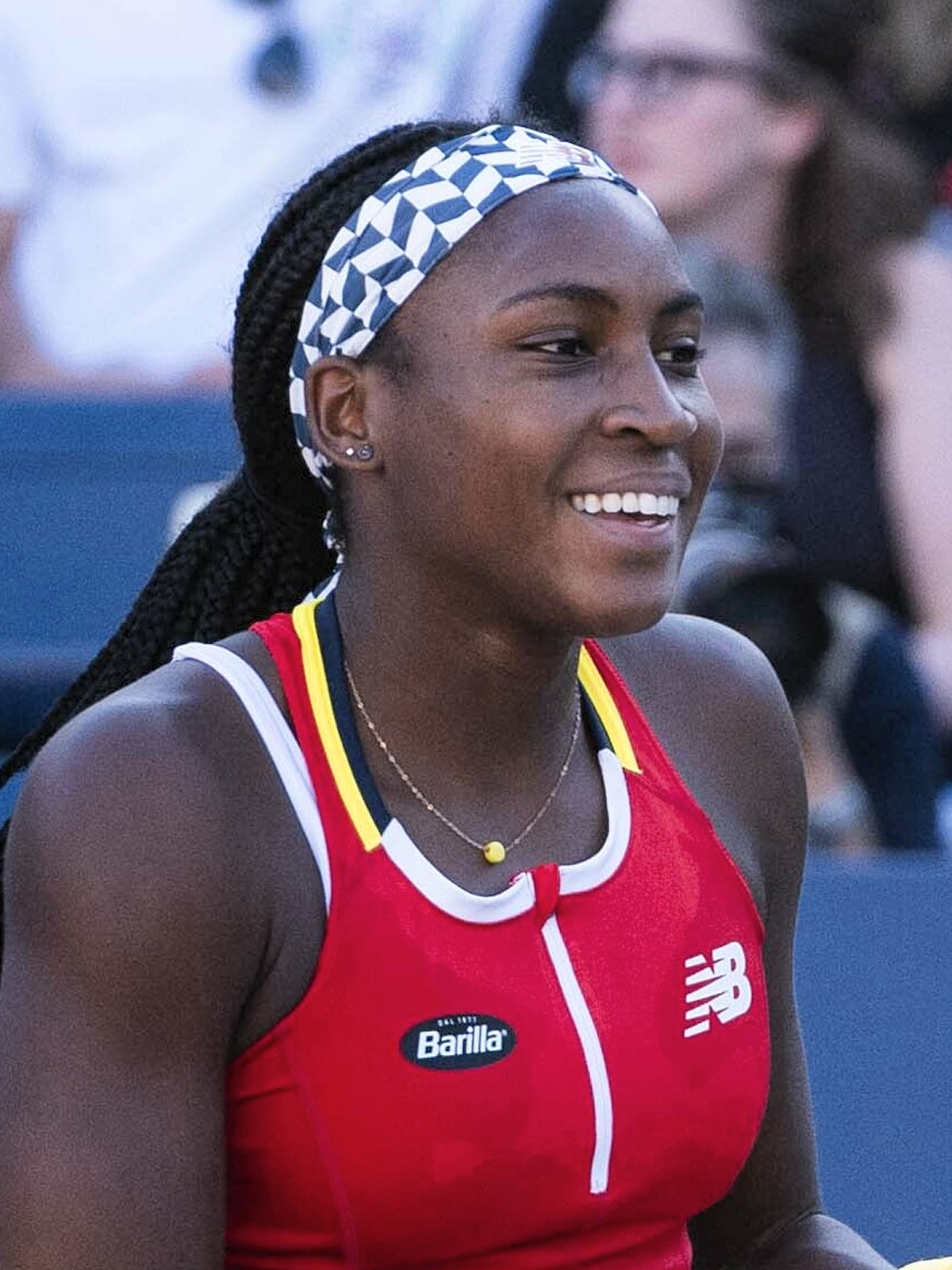
Gauff

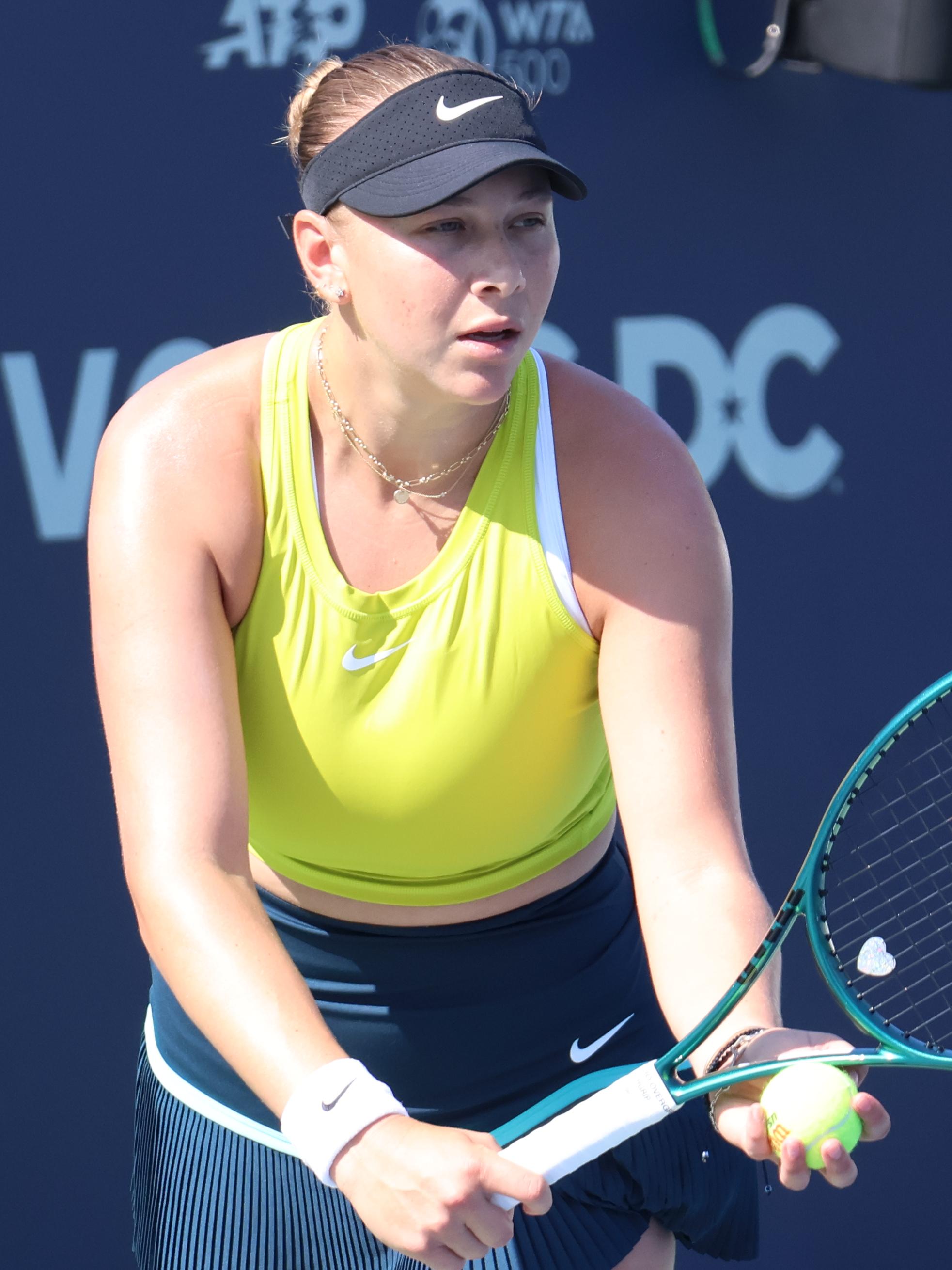
Anisimova

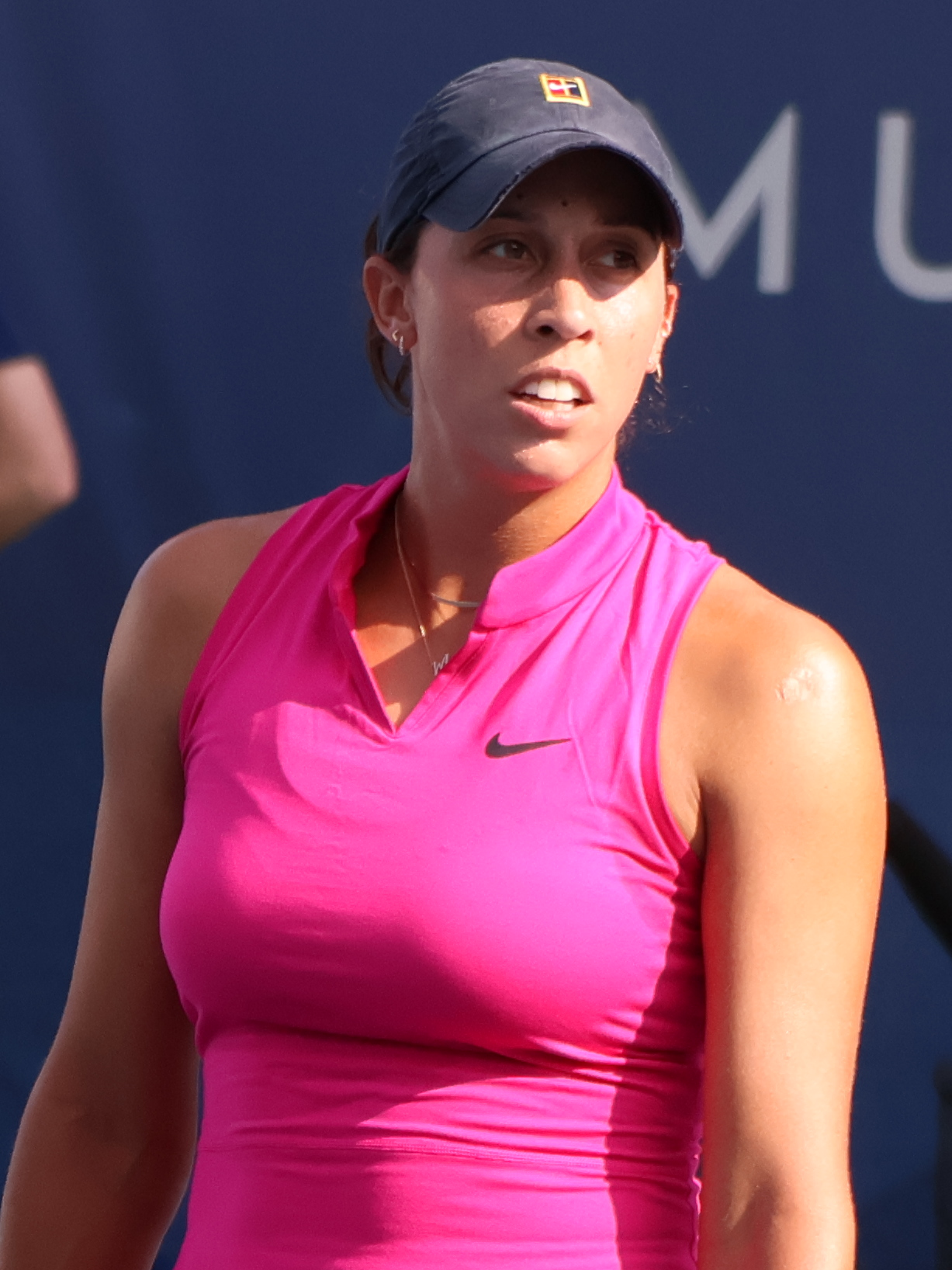
Keys

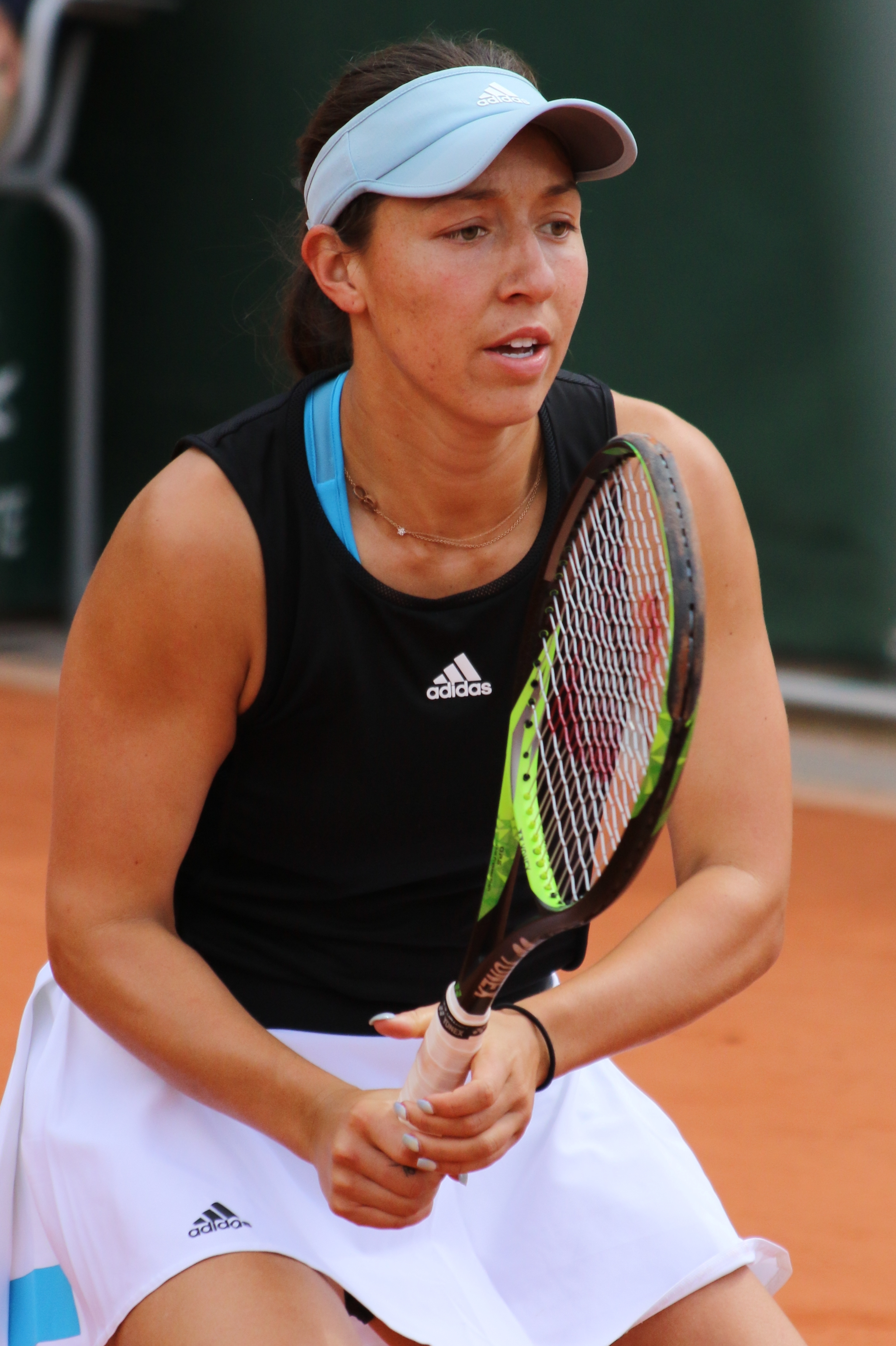
Pegula

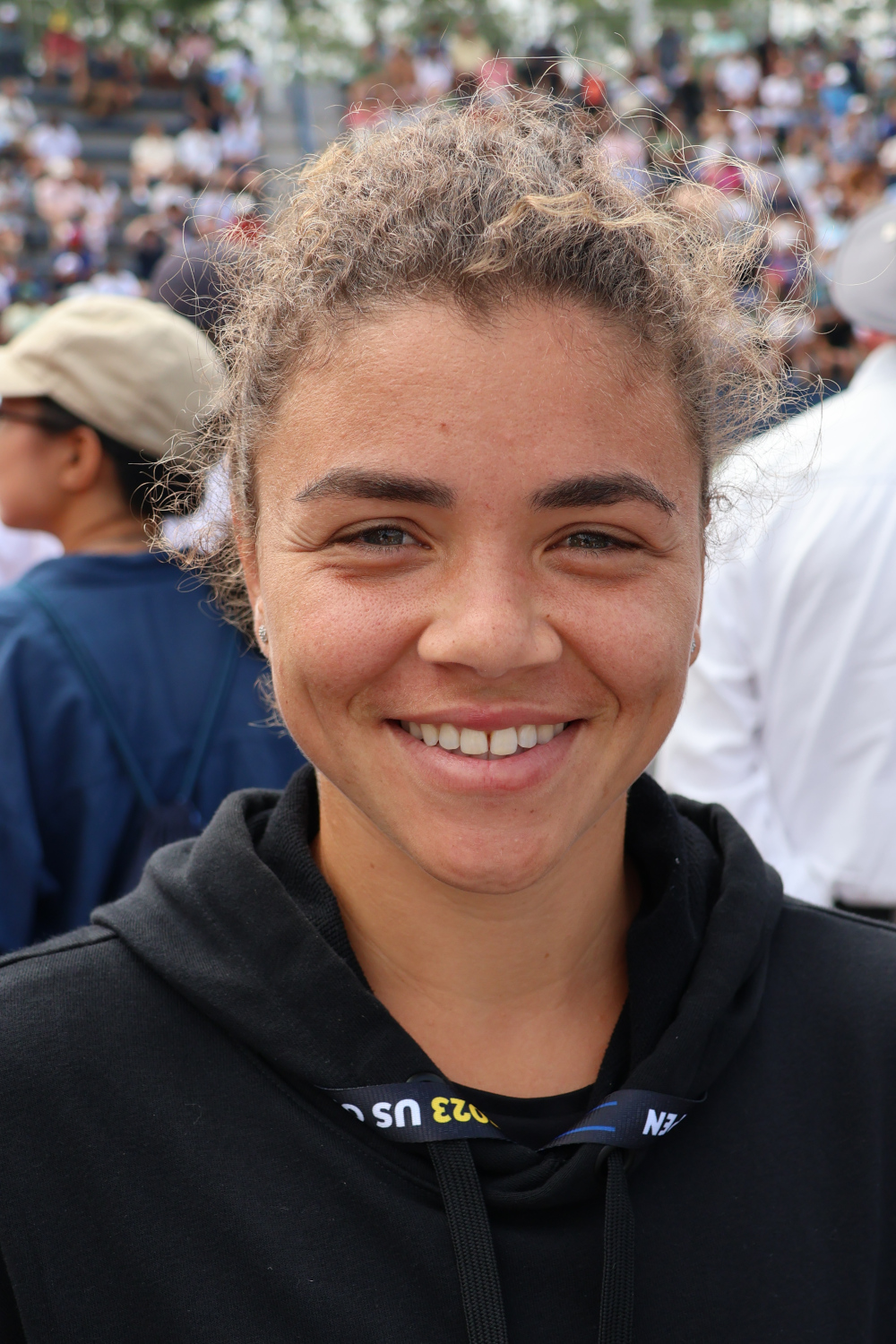
Paolini

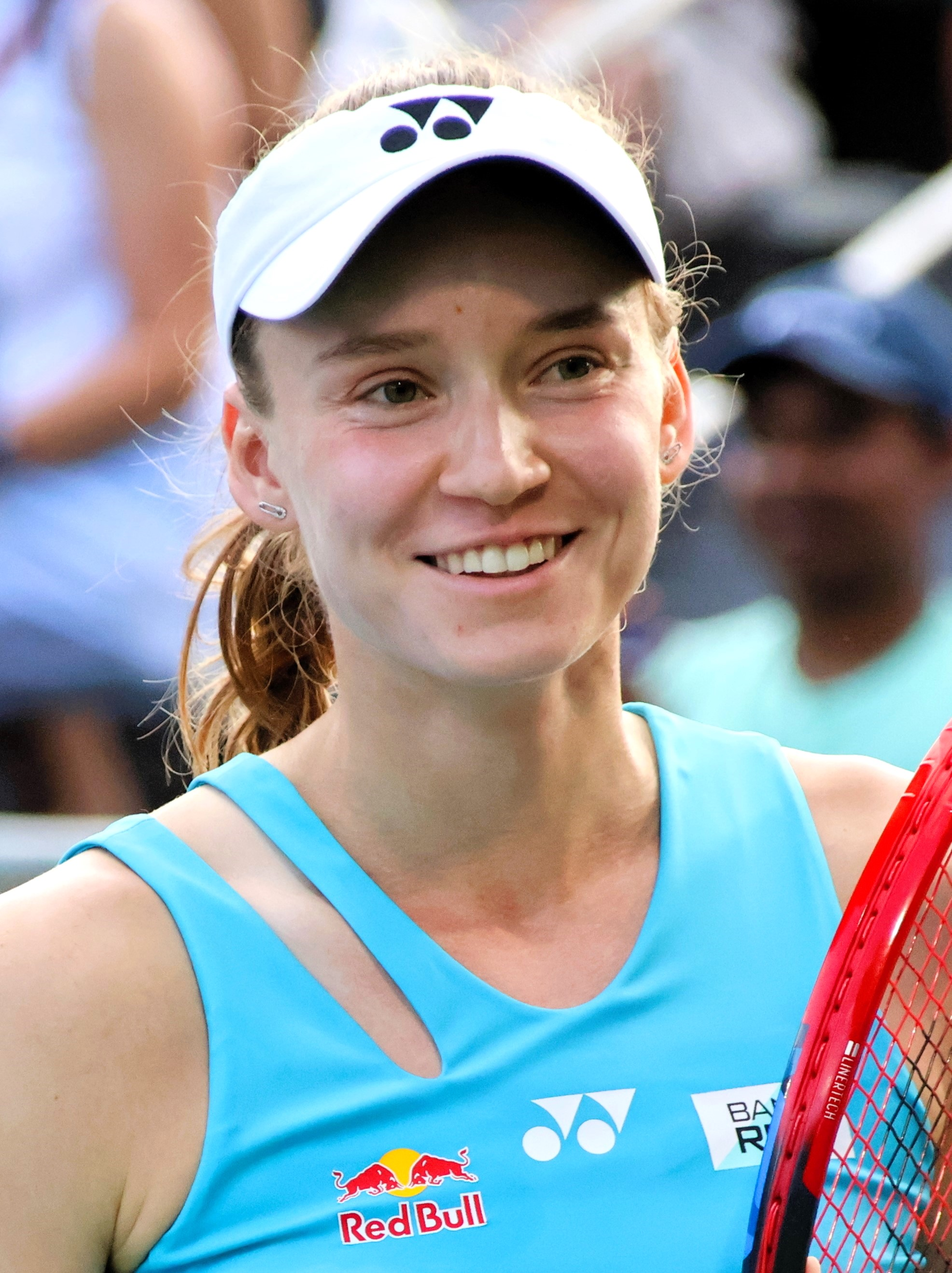
Rybakina

#	Players	Date qualified
1	Aryna Sabalenka	8 July
2	(Poland) Iga Świątek	17 August
3	(United States) Coco Gauff	30 September
4	(United States) Amanda Anisimova	2 October
5	(United States) Madison Keys	2 October
6	(United States) Jessica Pegula	13 October
7	(Italy) Jasmine Paolini	18 October
8	(Kazakhstan) Elena Rybakina	23 October

=== Doubles ===
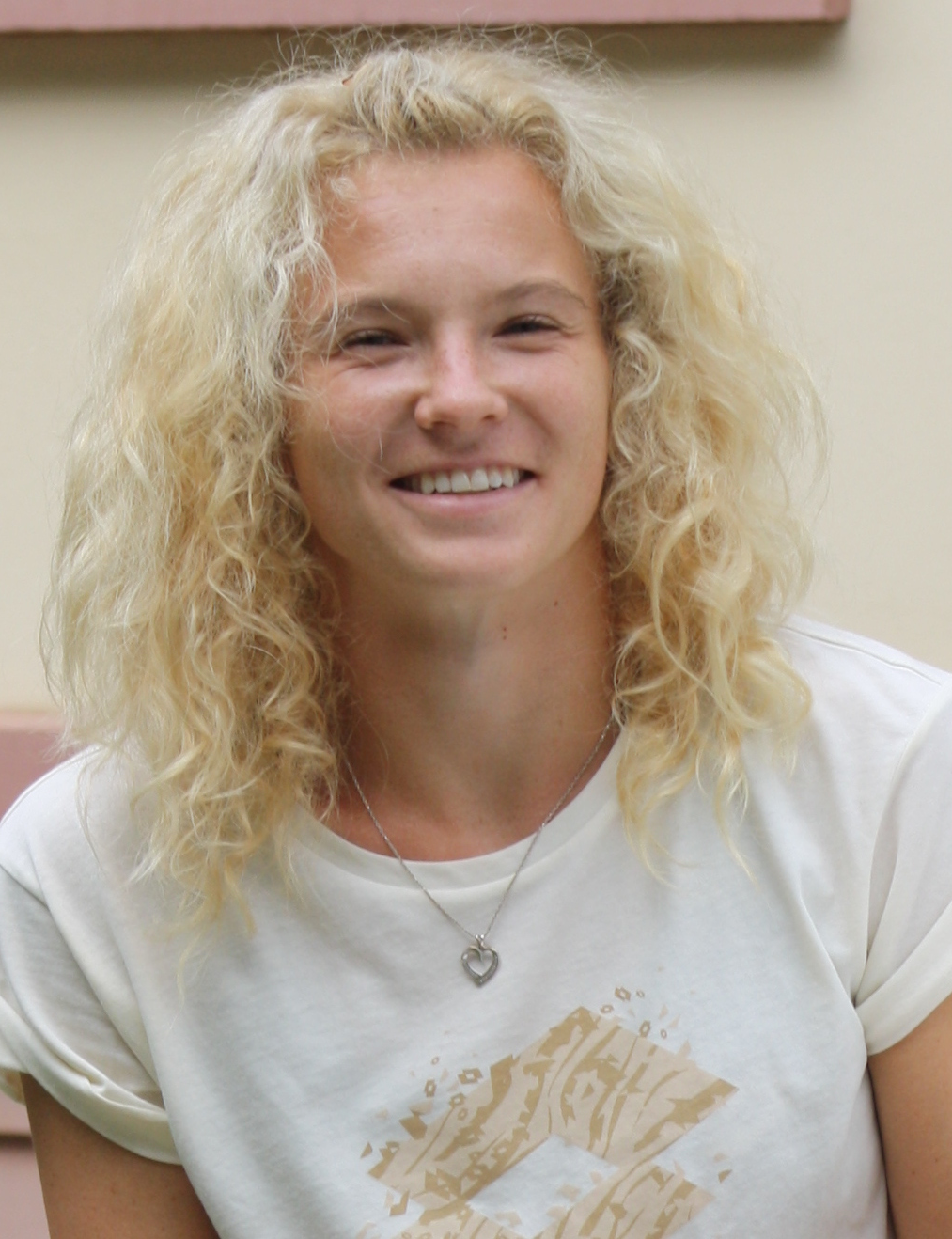
Siniaková

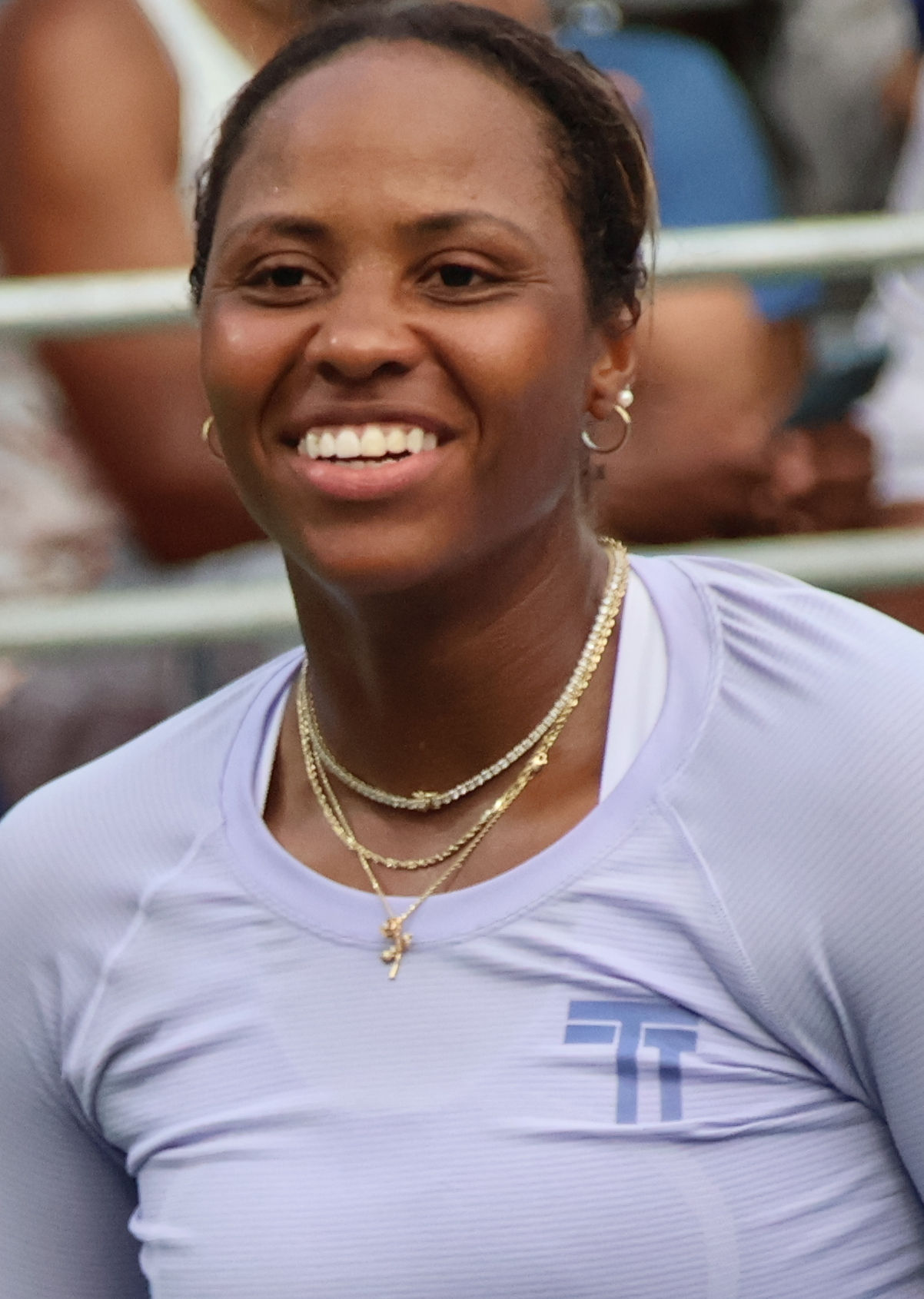
Townsend

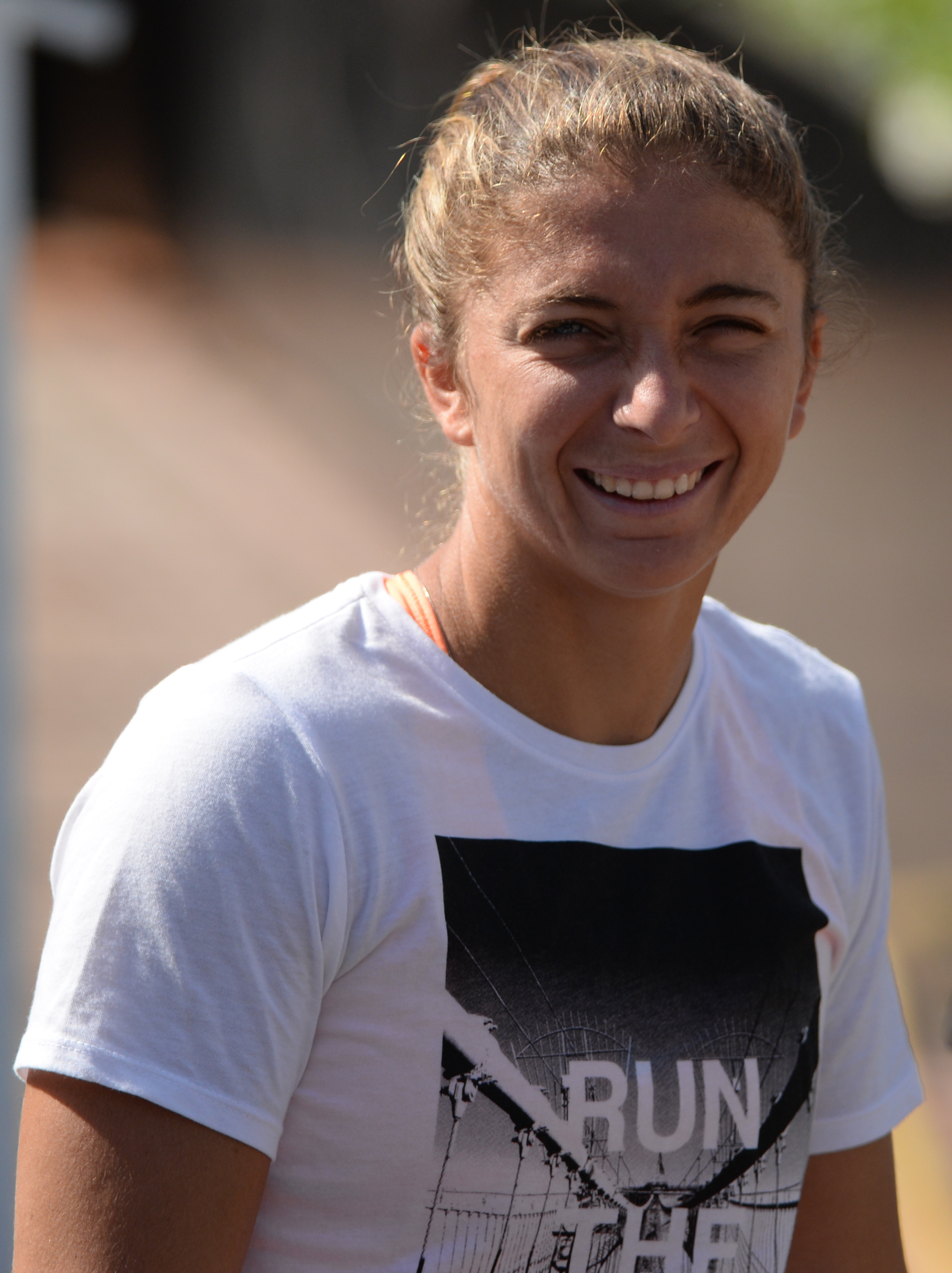
Errani

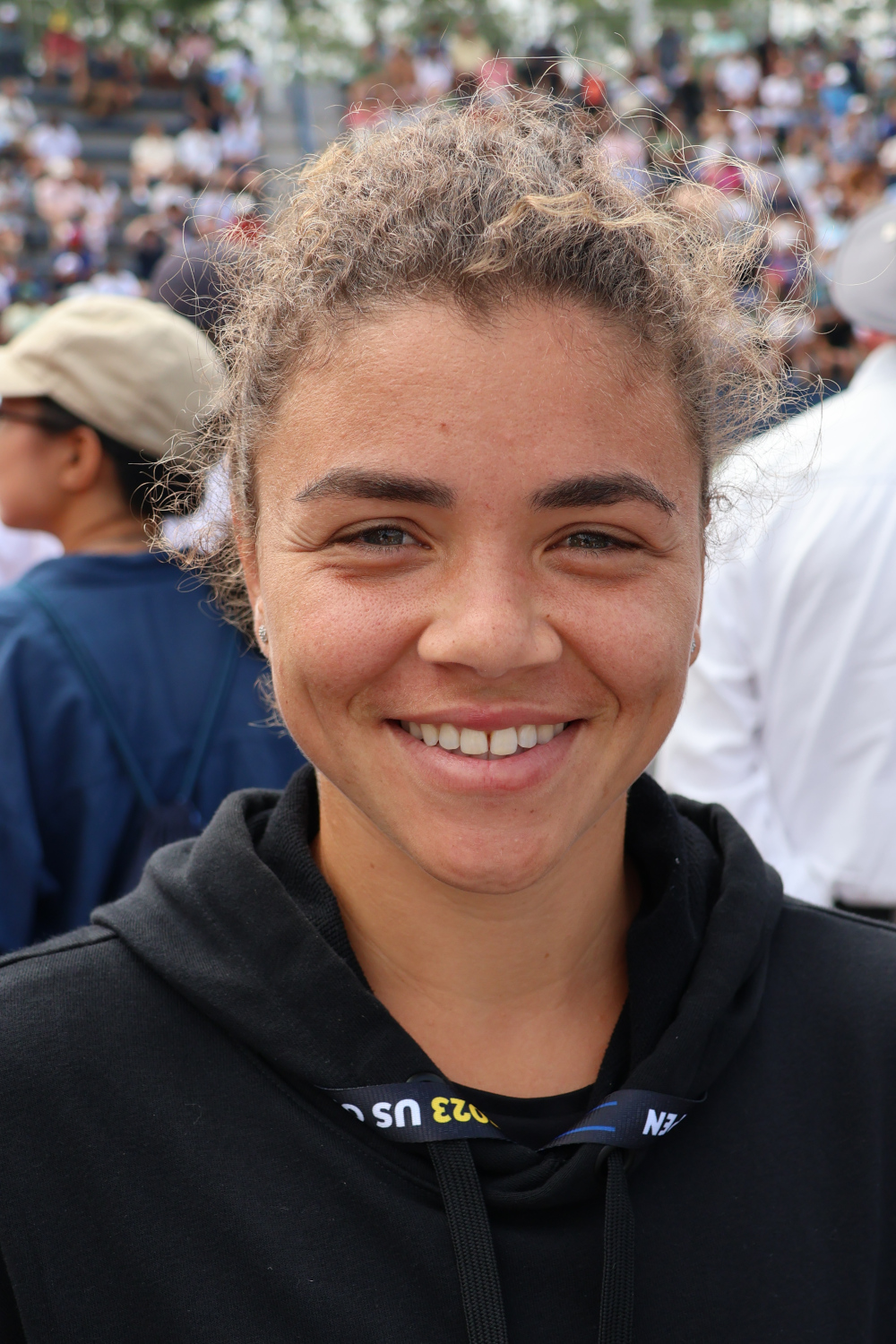
Paolini

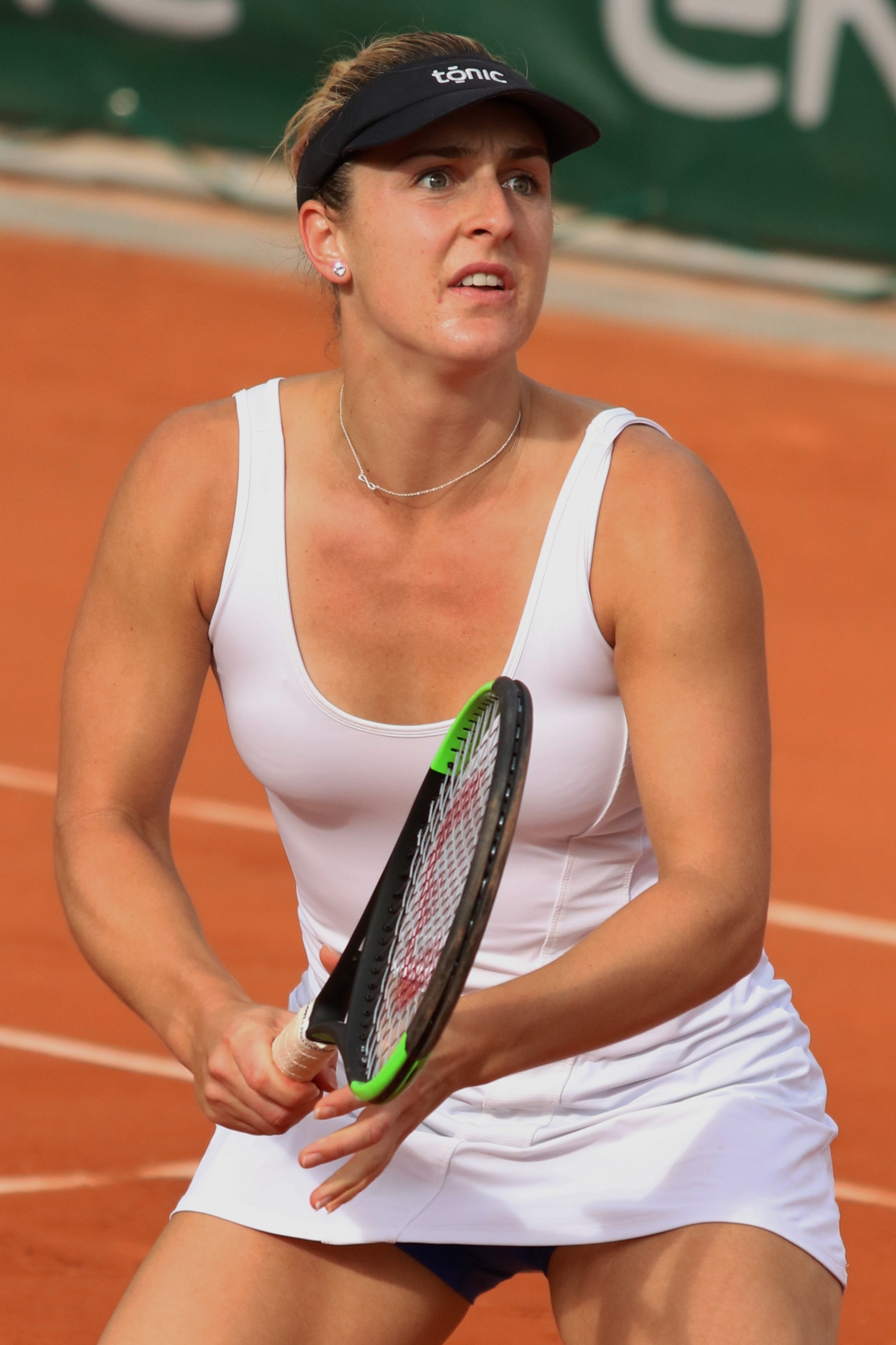
Dabrowski

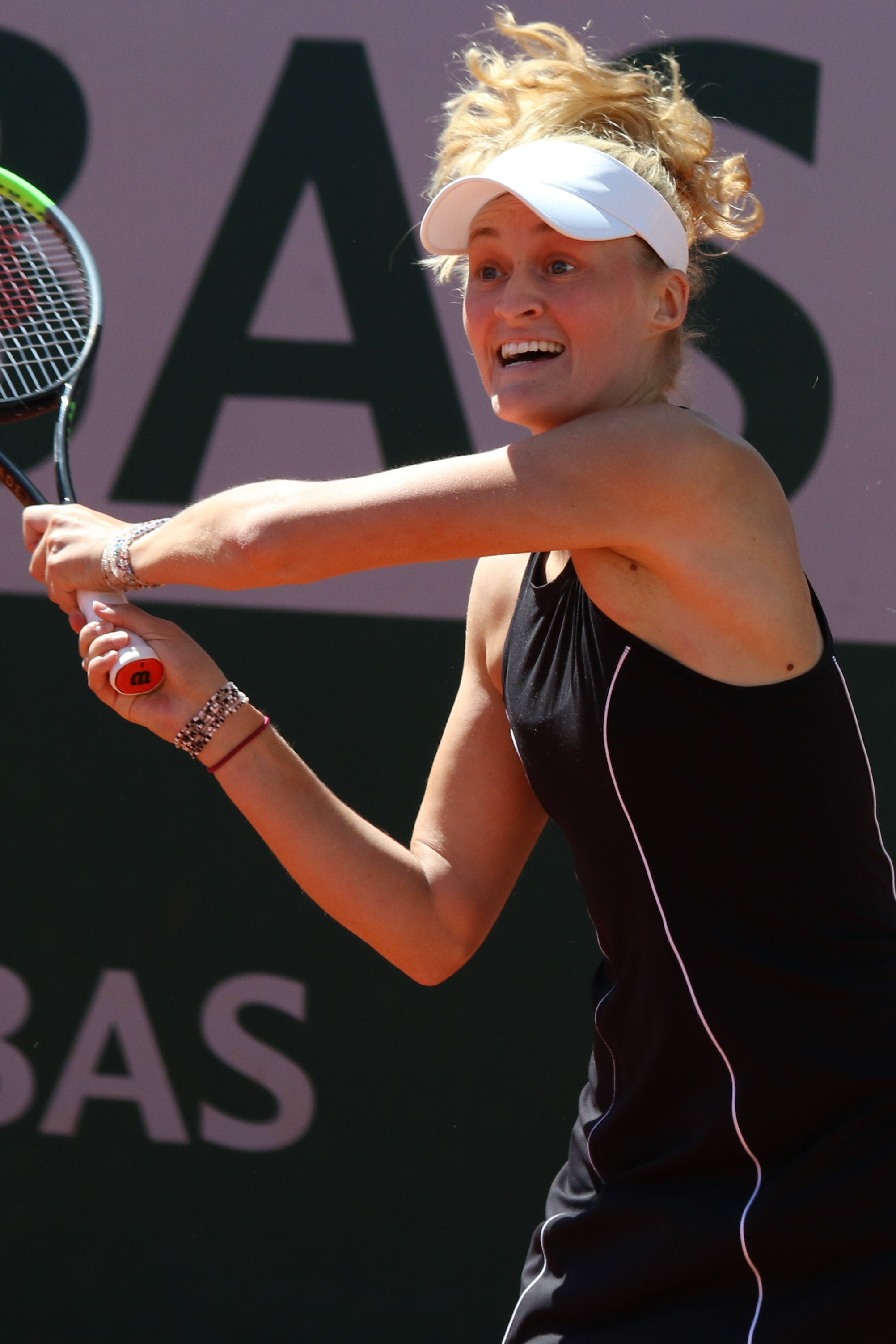
Routliffe

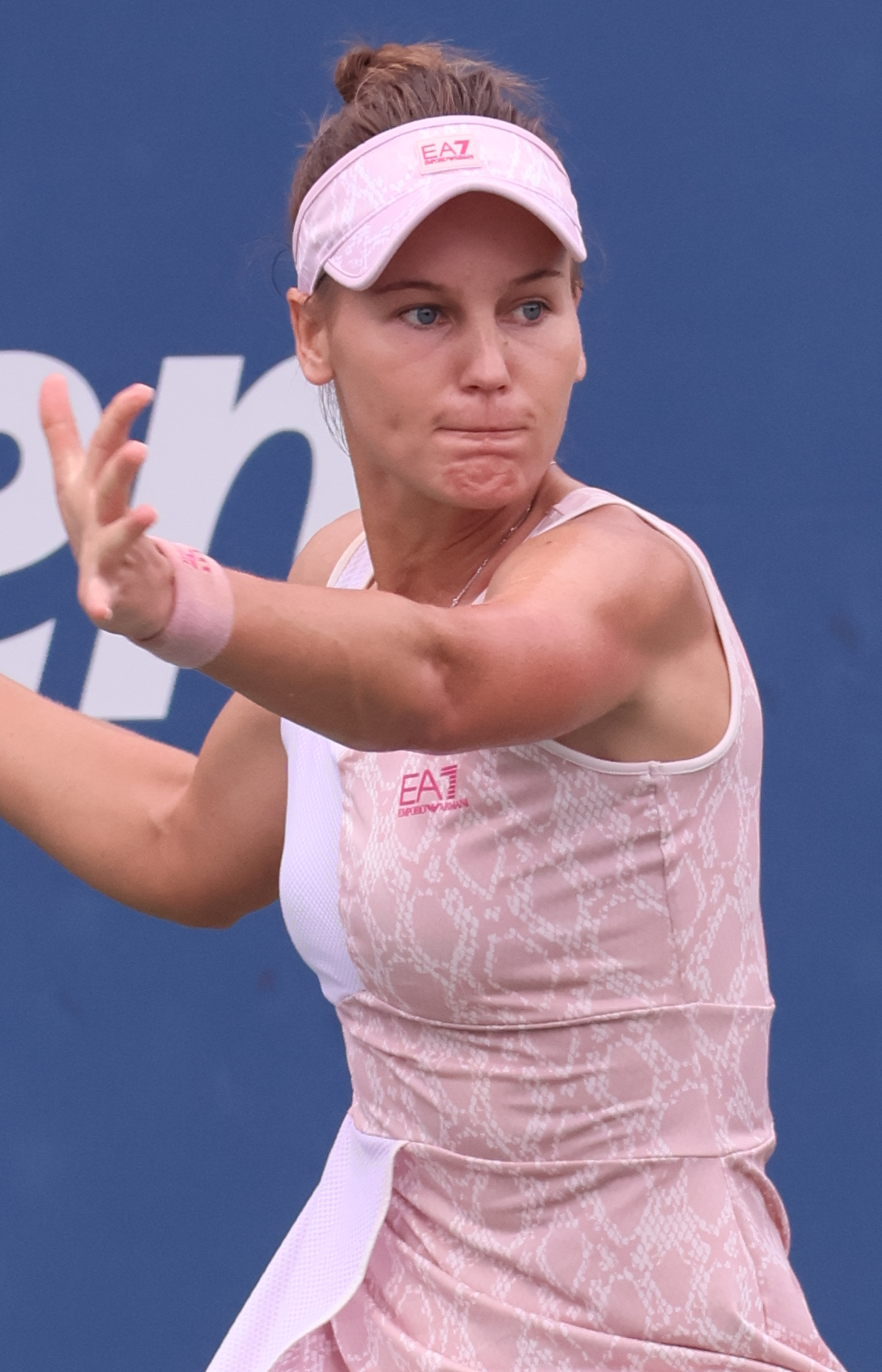
Kudermetova

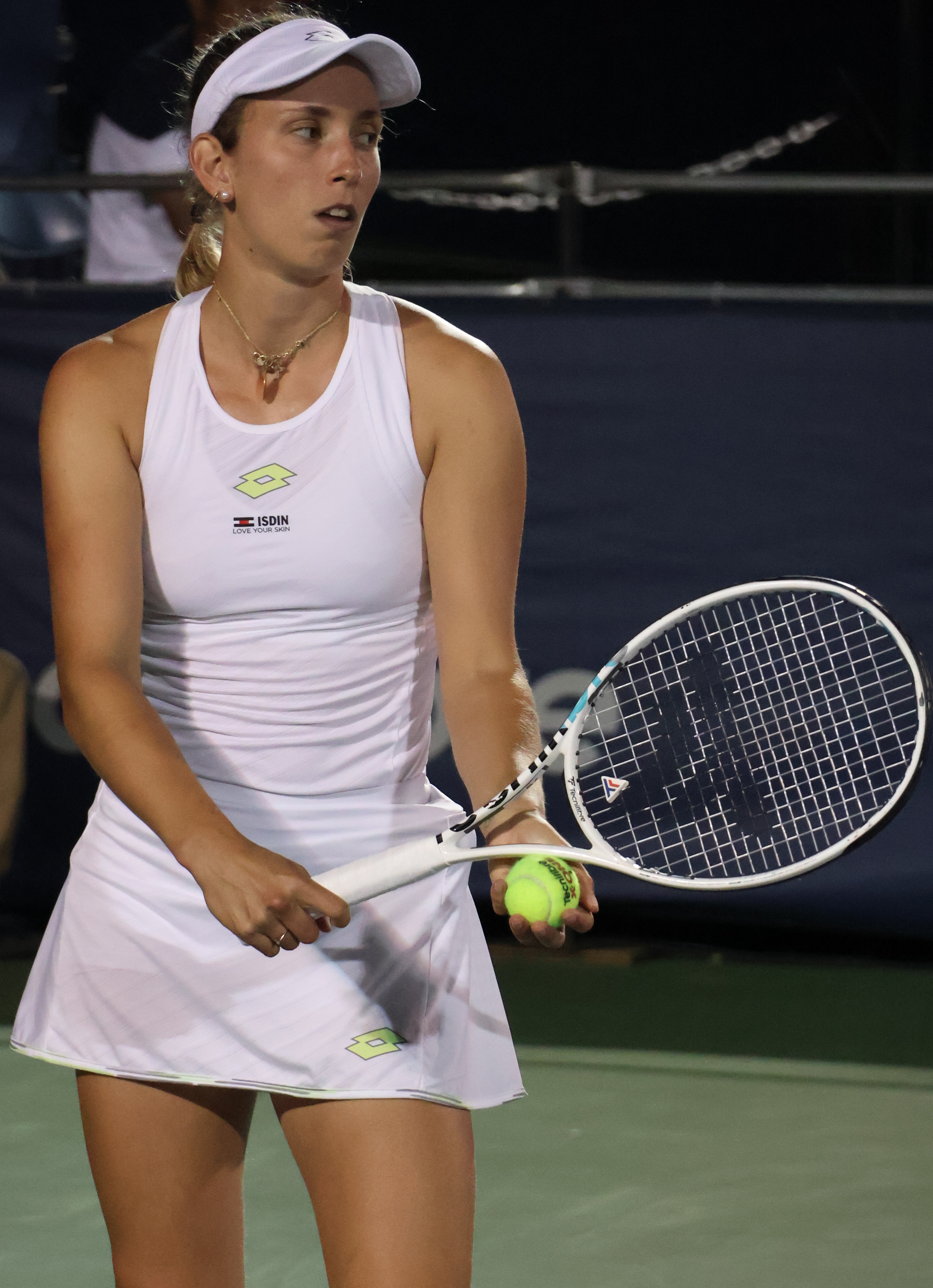
Mertens

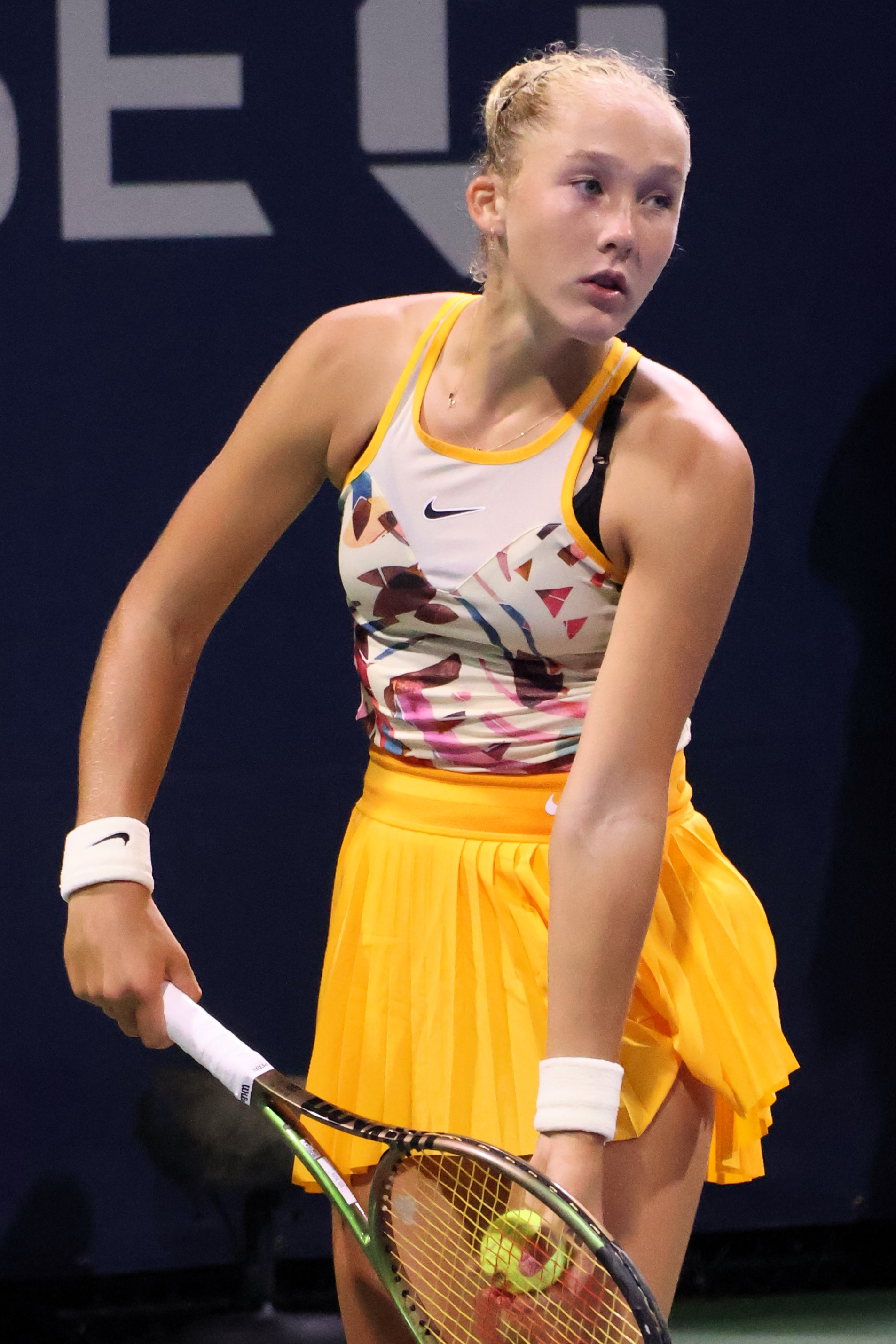
Andreeva

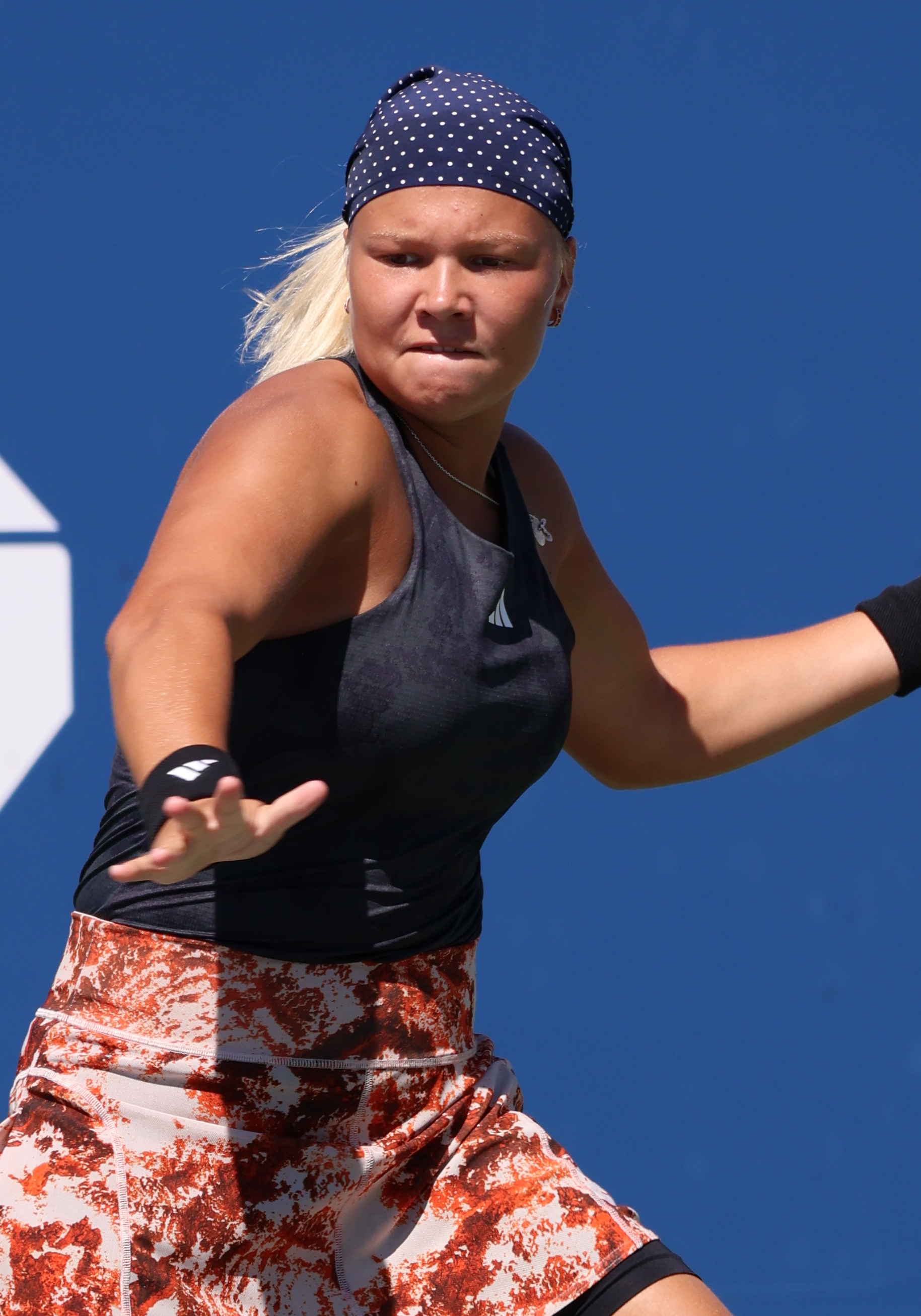
Shnaider

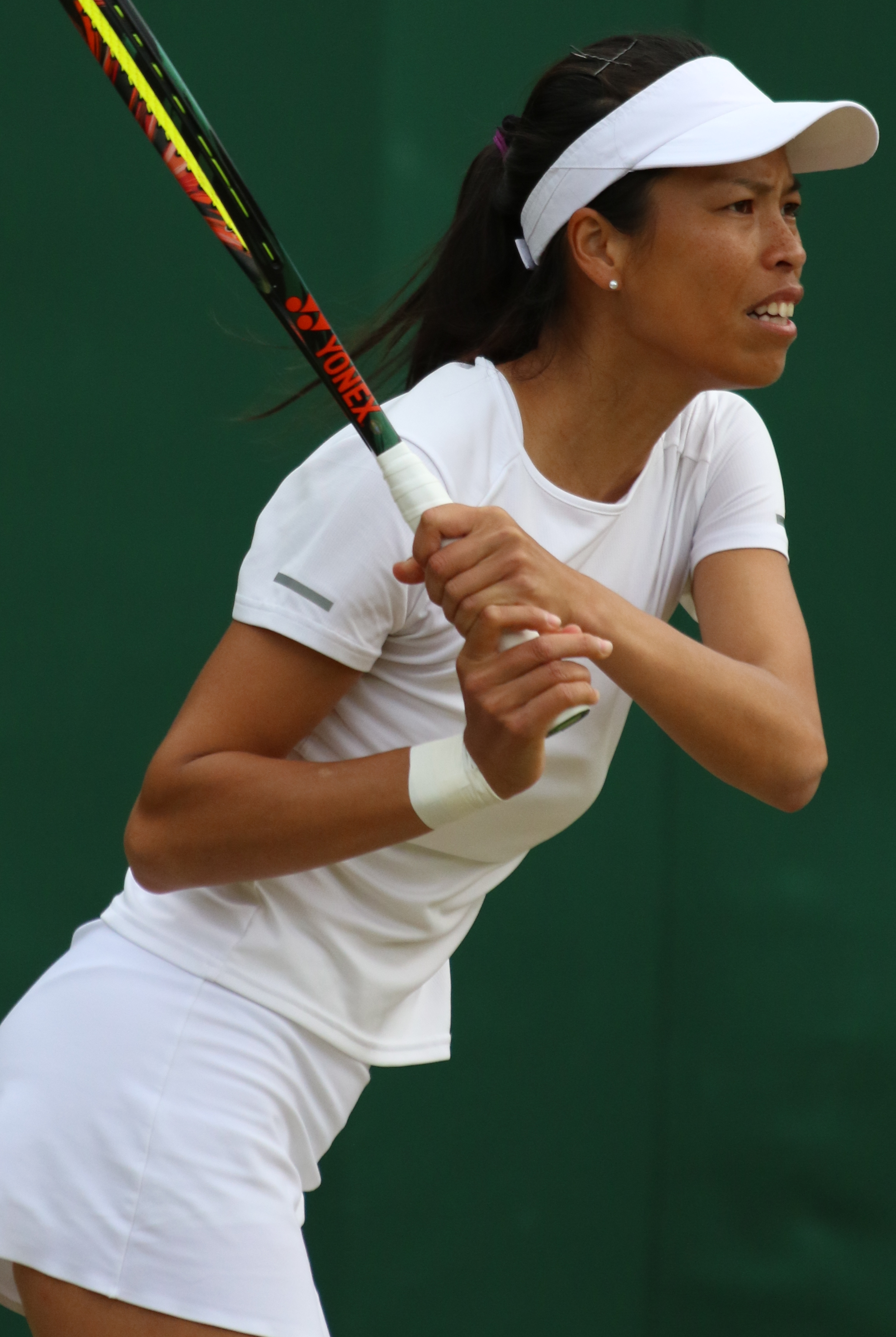
Hsieh

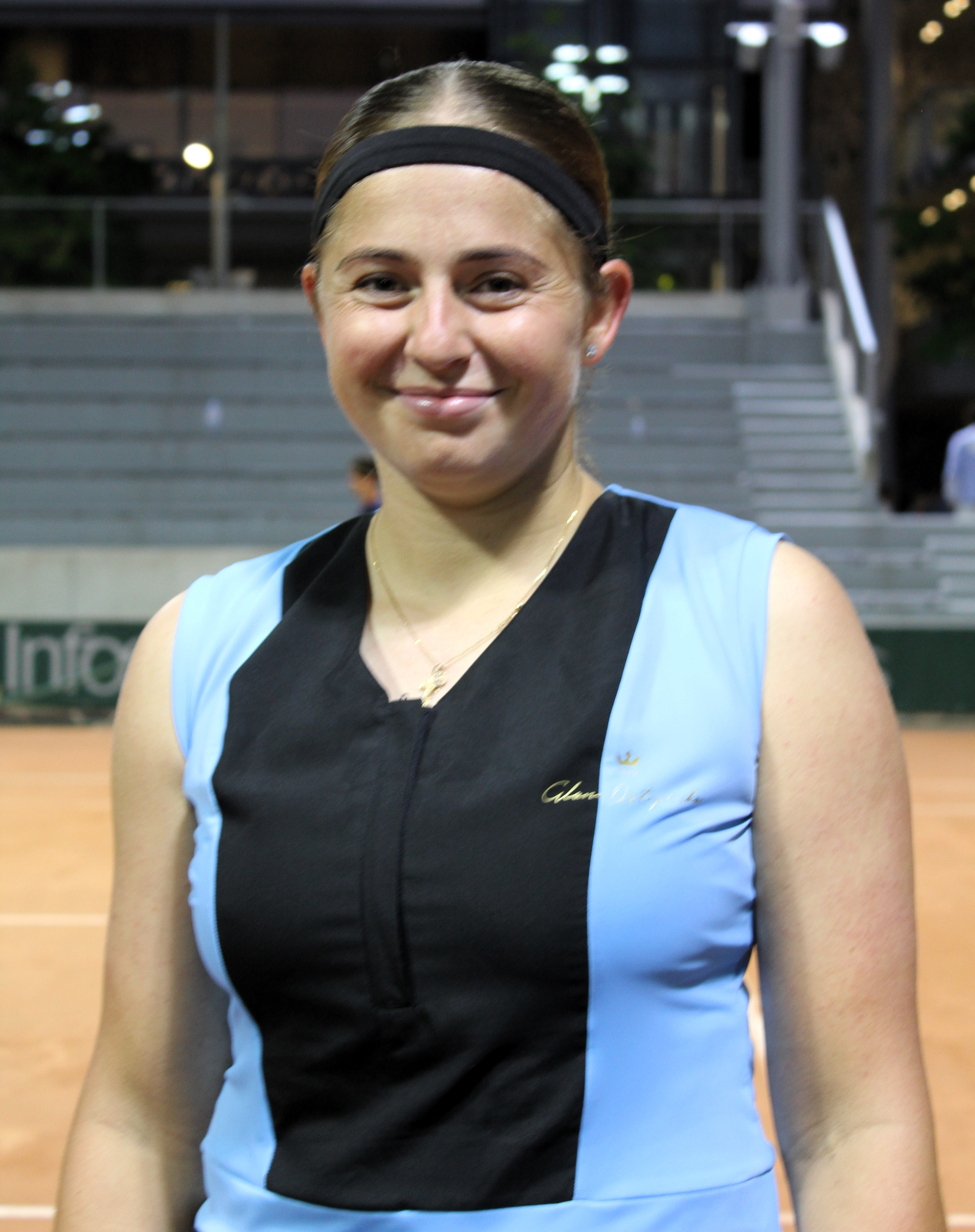
Ostapenko

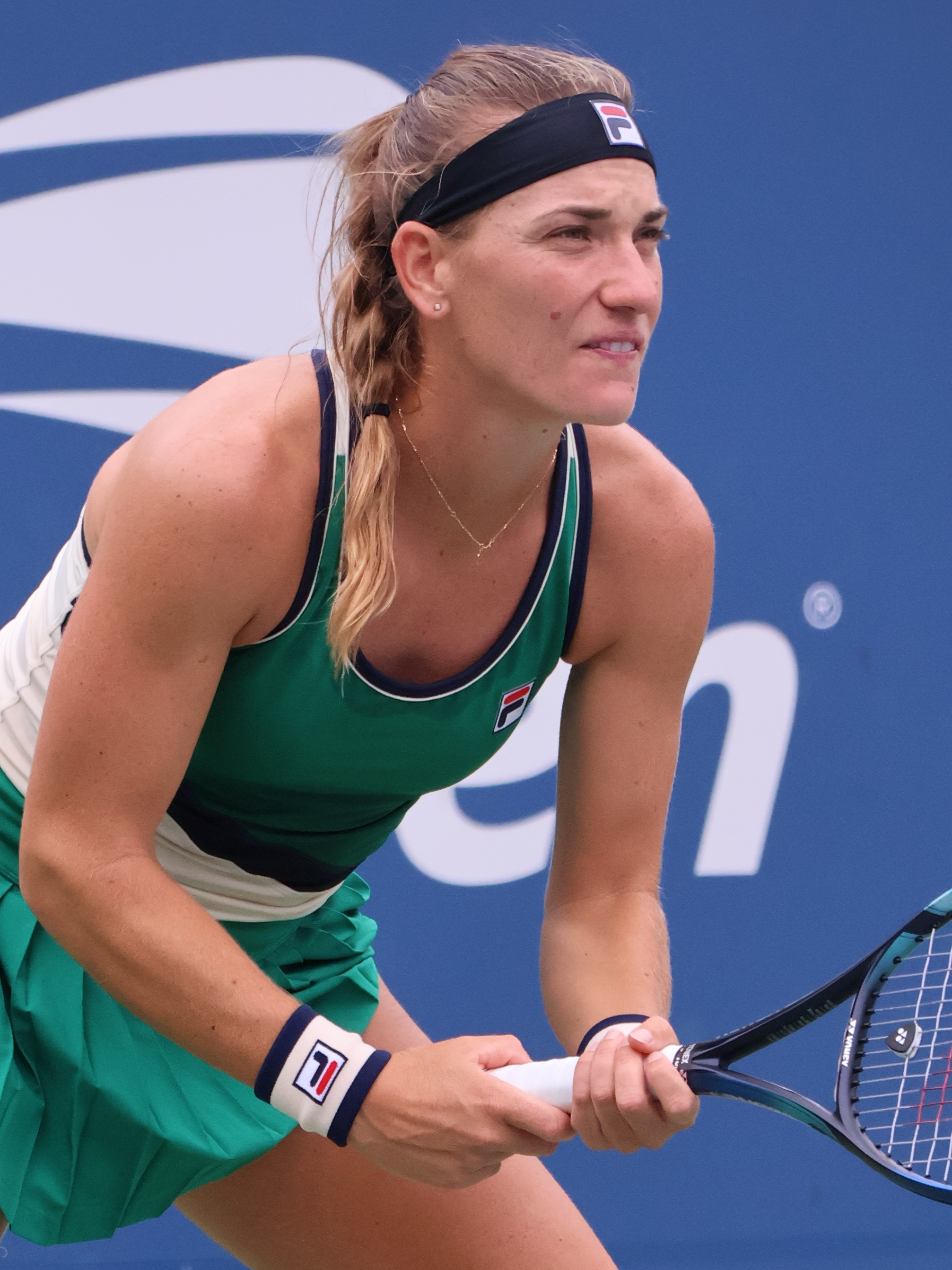
Babos

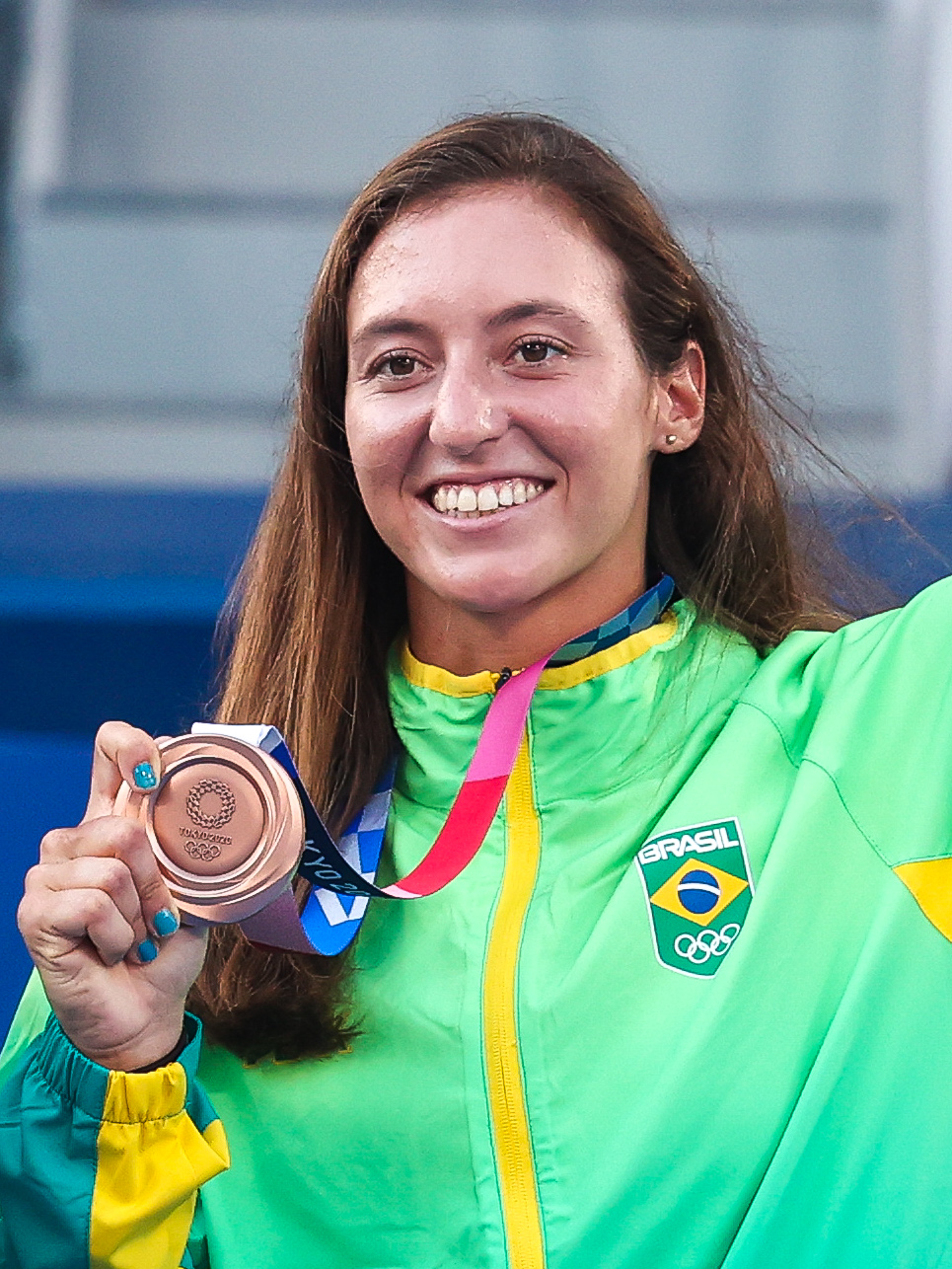
Stefani

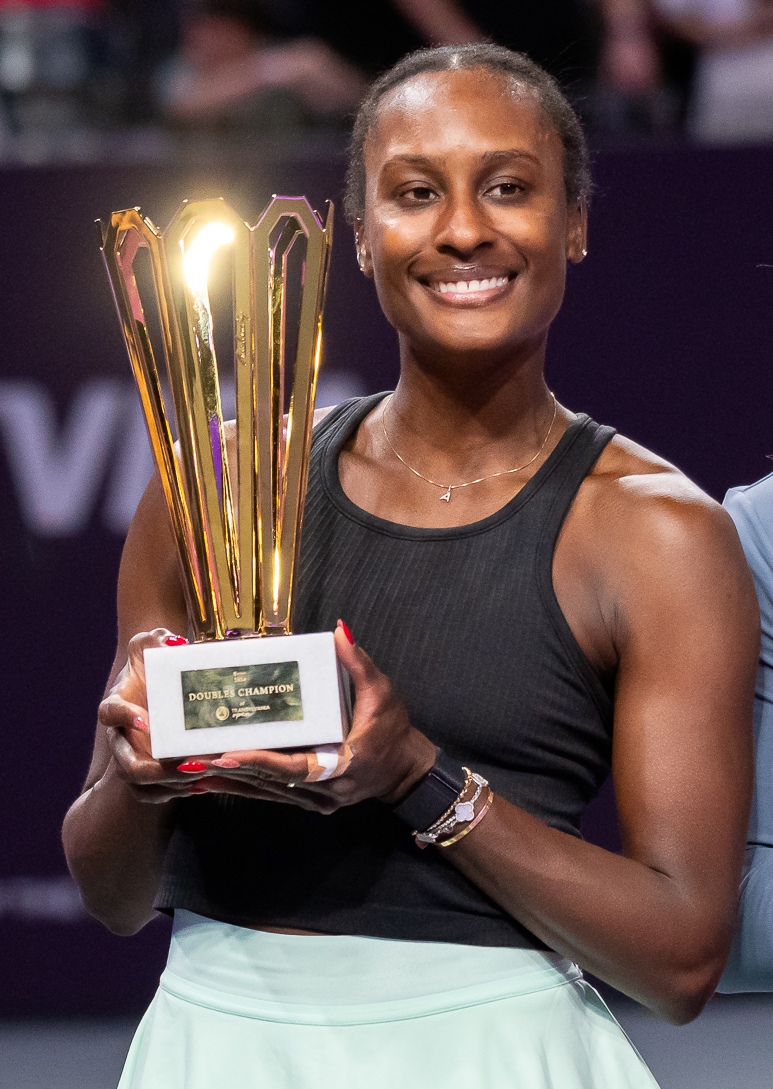
Muhammad

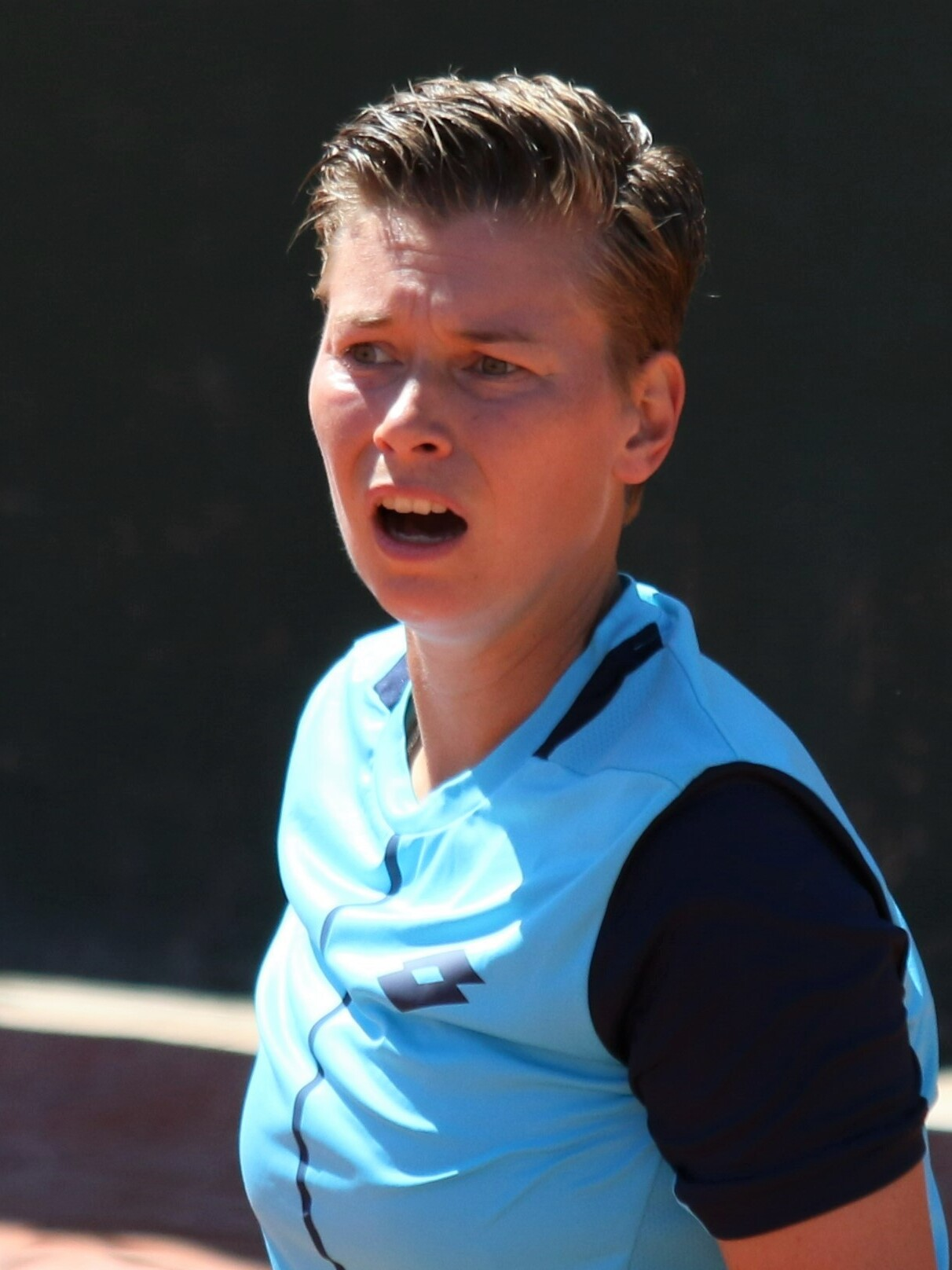
Schuurs

#	Players	Date qualified
1	(Czech Republic) Kateřina Siniaková (United States) Taylor Townsend	15 September
2	(Italy) Sara Errani (Italy) Jasmine Paolini	15 September
3	(Canada) Gabriela Dabrowski (New Zealand) Erin Routliffe	15 September
4	Veronika Kudermetova (Belgium) Elise Mertens	22 September
5	Mirra Andreeva; Diana Shnaider	1 October
6	(Chinese Taipei) Hsieh Su-wei (Latvia) Jeļena Ostapenko	13 October
7	(Hungary) Tímea Babos (Brazil) Luisa Stefani	20 October
8	(United States) Asia Muhammad (Netherlands) Demi Schuurs	20 October

== Points breakdown ==
Key
W	F	SF	QF	#R	RR	Q#	DNQ	A	NH

(W) winner; (F) finalist; (SF) semifinalist; (QF) quarterfinalist; (#R) rounds 4, 3, 2, 1; (RR) round-robin stage; (Q#) qualification round; (DNQ) did not qualify; (A) absent; (NH) not held; (SR) strike rate (events won / competed); (W–L) win–loss record.
To avoid confusion and double counting, these charts are updated at the conclusion of a tournament or when the player's participation has ended.

=== Singles ===
† Player qualified for WTA Finals.

Rank	Player	Grand Slam				WTA 1000 (Note: 0-point penalties were applied for every WTA 1000 in which players had or would have been accepted into the main draw but were absent and if players fail to fulfill their WTA 500 tournaments commitment obligations. These cases are marked with P.)							Best other							Total points	Tourn	Titles
Rank	Player	Grand Slam				Best combined						WTA only	Best other							Total points	Tourn	Titles
Rank	Player	AUS	FRA	WIM	USO	1	2	3	4	5	6	WTA only	1	2	3	4	5	6	7	Total points	Tourn	Titles
1^{†}	Aryna Sabalenka	F 1300	F 1300	SF; 780	W 2000	W 1000	W 1000	F 650	QF; 215	QF; 215	A 0	SF; 390	W 500	F 325	SF; 195	P 0	P 0			9,870	15	4
2^{†}	(Poland) Iga Świątek	SF; 780	SF; 780	W 2000	QF; 430	W 1000	SF; 390	SF; 390	QF; 215	R16; 120	R16; 120	SF; 390	W 500	F 325	F 325	QF; 215	QF; 215	P 0	P 0	8,195	18	3
3^{†}	(United States) Coco Gauff	QF; 430	W 2000	R128; 10	R16; 240	F 650	F 650	SF; 390	QF; 215	R16; 120	R16; 120	W 1000	W 500	R16; 120	QF; 108	R32; 10	P 0	P 0		6,563	17	3
4^{†}	(United States) Amanda Anisimova	R64; 70	R16; 240	F 1300	F 1300	W 1000	R16; 120	R16; 120	R32; 35	R64; 10	R64; 10	W 1000	F 325	SF; 195	QF; 108	QF; 54	P 0	P 0	P 0	5,887	18	2
5^{†}	(United States) Jessica Pegula	R32; 130	R16; 240	R128; 10	SF; 780	F 650	SF; 390	R16; 120	R32; 65	R32; 65	R32; 65	F 650	W 500	W 500	F 325	W 250	QF; 215	R16; 120	QF; 108	5,183	22	3
6^{†}	(Kazakhstan) Elena Rybakina	R16; 240	R16; 240	R32; 130	R16; 240	SF; 390	SF; 390	R16; 120	R32; 65	R32; 65	R32; 65	SF; 390	W 500	W 500	QF; 215	QF; 215	SF; 195	SF; 195	SF; 195	4,350	22	2
7^{†}	(United States) Madison Keys	W 2000	QF; 430	R32; 130	R128; 10	SF; 390	QF; 215	QF; 215	R16; 120	R32; 65	R32; 65	A 0	W 500	SF; 195	P 0	P 0	P 0			4,335	15	2
8^{†}	(Italy) Jasmine Paolini	R32; 130	R16; 240	R64; 70	R32; 130	W 1000	F 650	SF; 390	QF; 215	R16; 120	R32; 65	SF; 390	SF; 195	SF; 195	SF; 195	R16; 120	R16; 120	QF; 90	R64; 10	4,325	19	1
Alternates
9	Mirra Andreeva	R16; 240	QF; 430	QF; 430	R32; 130	W 1000	QF; 215	QF; 215	R16; 120	R32; 65	R32; 35	W 1000	SF; 195	QF; 108	R32; 65	R16; 60	R32; 10	R32; 1	P 0	4,319	18	2
10	Ekaterina Alexandrova	R128; 10	R16; 240	R16; 240	R16; 240	R16; 120	R16; 120	R64; 10	R64; 10	R64; 10	P 0	SF; 390	W 500	F 325	F 325	F 325	SF; 195	SF; 195	R16; 120	3,375	25	1

=== Doubles ===
† Team qualified for WTA Finals

Rank	Team	Points												Total points	Tourn	Titles
Rank	Team	1	2	3	4	5	6	7	8	9	10	11	12	Total points	Tourn	Titles
1^{†}	(Italy) Sara Errani (Italy) Jasmine Paolini	W 2000	W 1000	W 1000	W 1000	SF; 780	SF; 390	F 325	R32; 130	R32; 130	R16; 120	R16; 120	R16; 120	7,115	14	4
2^{†}	(Czech Republic) Kateřina Siniaková (United States) Taylor Townsend	W 2000	F 1300	W 1000	SF; 780	QF; 430	SF; 390	SF; 390						6,290	7	2
3^{†}	(Canada) Gabriela Dabrowski (New Zealand) Erin Routliffe	W 2000	W 1000	SF; 780	W 500	QF; 430	QF; 215	SF; 195	R16; 120	QF; 108	R16; 10	R32; 10	R32; 10	5,378	16	3
4^{†}	Veronika Kudermetova (Belgium) Elise Mertens	W 2000	SF; 780	F 650	F 650	QF; 430	R16; 120	R16; 120	R16; 120	SF; 98				4,968	9	1
5^{†}	Mirra Andreeva; Diana Shnaider	W 1000	SF; 780	SF; 780	W 500	QF; 430	SF; 390	SF; 390	R16; 240	R16; 120	R32; 10	R32; 10	R32; 10	4,660	14	2
6^{†}	(Chinese Taipei) Hsieh Su-wei (Latvia) Jeļena Ostapenko	F 1300	F 1300	F 650	SF; 390	SF; 390	R32; 130	R16; 120	R16; 10	R16; 1				4,291	9	0
7^{†}	(Hungary) Tímea Babos (Brazil) Luisa Stefani	W 500	W 500	W 500	QF; 430	QF; 430	F 325	W 250	R16; 240	QF; 215	SF; 195	SF; 195	R16; 120	3,900	19	4
8^{†}	(United States) Asia Muhammad (Netherlands) Demi Schuurs	W 1000	W 500	QF; 430	R16; 240	R16; 240	QF; 215	SF; 195	R32; 130	R16; 120	R16; 120	R16; 120	R16; 120	3,430	22	2
Alternates
9	(Kazakhstan) Anna Danilina (Serbia) Aleksandra Krunić	F 1300	F 650	F 325	W 250	R16; 240	QF; 215	R16; 120	QF; 108	R32; 10				3,218	9	1
10	(China) Guo Hanyu; Alexandra Panova	F 650	W 500	W 500	F 325	R16; 240	QF; 215	R32; 130	R32; 130	R16; 120	R32; 10	R16; 1	R16; 1	2,822	12	2

== Head-to-head records ==
Below are the singles head-to-head records as they approached the tournament.

		Sabalenka	Świątek	Gauff	Anisimova	Pegula	Rybakina	Keys	Paolini	Overall	YTD W–L
1	Aryna Sabalenka		5–8	5–6	4–6	8–3	8–5	5–2	5–2	40–32	59–11
2	(Poland) Iga Świątek	8–5		11–4	1–1	6–5	6–4	5–2	6–1	43–22	61–15
3	(United States) Coco Gauff	6–5	4–11		1–2	3–4	1–0	3–3	3–3	21–28	47–14
4	(United States) Amanda Anisimova	6–4	1–1	2–1		0–3	0–0	0–0	2–0	11–9	45–16
5	(United States) Jessica Pegula	3–8	5–6	4–3	3–0		3–1	1–2	5–1	24–21	50–19
6	(Kazakhstan) Elena Rybakina	5–8	4–6	0–1	0–0	1–3		3–3	3–3	16–24	53–19
7	(United States) Madison Keys	2–5	2–5	3–3	0–0	2–1	3–3		1–1	13–18	37–13
8	(Italy) Jasmine Paolini	2–5	1–6	3–3	0–2	1–5	3–3	1–1		11–25	43–18

== See also ==
- WTA rankings
- 2025 WTA Tour
- 2025 ATP Finals
