= 2025 Bad Homburg Open =

- Date: 23–29 June
- Edition: 5th
- Category: WTA 500
- Draw: 32S / 16D
- Prize money: $1,064,510
- Surface: Grass
- Location: Bad Homburg, Germany
- Venue: TC Bad Homburg

Champions

Singles
- (United States) Jessica Pegula

Doubles
- (China) Guo Hanyu / Alexandra Panova
- Bad Homburg Open

The 2025 Bad Homburg Open powered by Solarwatt was a women's professional tennis tournament played on outdoor grass courts at the TC Bad Homburg in Bad Homburg, Germany, from 23 to 29 June 2025. It was the fourth edition of the Bad Homburg Open and is classified as a WTA 500 event on the 2025 WTA Tour.

== Champions ==
=== Singles ===
- (United States) Jessica Pegula def. (Poland) Iga Świątek, 6–4, 7–5

=== Doubles ===
- (China) Guo Hanyu / Alexandra Panova def. (Ukraine) Lyudmyla Kichenok / (Australia) Ellen Perez, 4–6, 7–6^{(7–4)}, [10–5]

== Singles main-draw entrants ==
=== Seeds ===
Country	Player	Rank^{1}	Seed
USA	Jessica Pegula	3	1
ITA	Jasmine Paolini	5	2
	Mirra Andreeva	7	3
POL	Iga Świątek	8	4
USA	Emma Navarro	9	5
	Diana Shnaider	12	6
UKR	Elina Svitolina	14	7
	Ekaterina Alexandrova	18	8

- ^{1} Rankings are as of 16 June 2025.

=== Other entrants ===
The following players received wildcards into the main draw:

- (Germany) Tatjana Maria
- (Japan) Naomi Osaka
- (Greece) Maria Sakkari
- (Germany) Laura Siegemund

The following player received entry using a protected ranking:

- (Switzerland) Belinda Bencic

The following player received entry as a special exempt:

- ~~(China) Wang Xinyu~~

The following players received entry from the qualifying draw:

- Victoria Azarenka
- (Serbia) Olga Danilović
- (Czech Republic) Kateřina Siniaková
- (Australia) Ajla Tomljanović

The following players received entry as a lucky loser:

- (United States) Ashlyn Krueger
- Veronika Kudermetova

=== Withdrawals ===
- (Spain) Paula Badosa → replaced by (Kazakhstan) Yulia Putintseva
- Liudmila Samsonova → replaced by Veronika Kudermetova
- (China) Wang Xinyu → replaced by (United States) Ashlyn Krueger

== Doubles main-draw entrants ==
=== Seeds ===
Country	Player	Country	Player	Rank^{1}	Seed
CAN	Gabriela Dabrowski	NZL	Erin Routliffe	8	1
UKR	Lyudmyla Kichenok	AUS	Ellen Perez	28	2
USA	Asia Muhammad	NED	Demi Schuurs	29	3
HUN	Tímea Babos	BRA	Luisa Stefani	51	4

- ^{1} Rankings are as of 16 June 2025.

=== Other entrants ===
The following pair received a wildcard into the doubles main draw:

- (United States) Caty McNally / (Germany) Nastasja Schunk

The following pair received entry as alternates:

- (Germany) Tayisiya Morderger / (Germany) Yana Morderger

=== Withdrawals ===
- (China) Wang Xinyu / (China) Zheng Saisai → replaced by (Germany) Tayisiya Morderger / (Germany) Yana Morderger
