= 2025 Mutua Madrid Open – Women's doubles =

Women's doubles
- 2025 Mutua Madrid Open

Final
- Champions: (Romania) Sorana Cîrstea; Anna Kalinskaya
- Runners-up: Veronika Kudermetova (Belgium) Elise Mertens
- Score: 6–7^{(10–12)}, 6–2, [12–10]

Details
- Draw: 32
- Seeds: 8

Events
Singles	men	women
Doubles	men	women
← 2024 ·	Mutua Madrid Open	· 2026 →

Sorana Cîrstea and Anna Kalinskaya defeated Veronika Kudermetova and Elise Mertens in the final, 6–7^{(10–12)}, 6–2, [12–10] to win the women's doubles tennis title at the 2025 Madrid Open. They saved a championship point in the match tiebreak.

Cristina Bucșa and Sara Sorribes Tormo were the defending champions, but Sorribes Tormo chose not to participate this year, having announced an indefinite break from professional tennis. Bucșa partnered Shuko Aoyama, but lost in the first round to Anna Danilina and Irina Khromacheva.

== Seeds ==
1. (Canada) Gabriela Dabrowski / (New Zealand) Erin Routliffe (first round)
2. (Italy) Sara Errani / (Italy) Jasmine Paolini (second round)
3. (Chinese Taipei) Hsieh Su-wei / (Latvia) Jeļena Ostapenko (semifinals)
4. (United States) Caroline Dolehide / (United States) Desirae Krawczyk (first round)
5. Mirra Andreeva / Diana Shnaider (second round)
6. (Kazakhstan) Anna Danilina / Irina Khromacheva (second round)
7. (United States) Asia Muhammad / (Netherlands) Demi Schuurs (first round)
8. (United States) Sofia Kenin / (Ukraine) Lyudmyla Kichenok (quarterfinals)

== Draw ==
=== Key ===
- Q = Qualifier
- WC = Wild card
- LL = Lucky loser
- Alt = Alternate
- ITF = ITF entry
- PR = Protected ranking
- SR = Special ranking
- SE = Special exempt
- JE = Junior exempt
- JR = Junior Accelerator Programme entrant
- CO = College Accelerator Programme entrant
- NG = Next Gen Accelerator Program entrant
- w/o = Walkover
- r = Retired
- d = Defaulted

=== Finals ===
Semifinals
(Romania) Sorana Cîrstea; Anna Kalinskaya	7^{7}	6
3	(Chinese Taipei) Hsieh Su-wei (Latvia) Jeļena Ostapenko	6^{2}	4
WC	Victoria Azarenka (United States) Ashlyn Krueger	6	4	[8]
Veronika Kudermetova (Belgium) Elise Mertens	4	6	[10]

Final
(Romania) Sorana Cîrstea; Anna Kalinskaya	6^{10}	6	[12]
Veronika Kudermetova (Belgium) Elise Mertens	7^{12}	2	[10]

=== Top half ===
First round
1	(Canada) G Dabrowski (New Zealand) E Routliffe	3	6	[7]
(Romania) S Cîrstea; A Kalinskaya	6	4	[10]
(Norway) U Eikeri (Japan) E Hozumi	6	6
(Hungary) T Babos (Brazil) L Stefani	1	0
(Czech Republic) L Nosková (Denmark) C Tauson	7^{7}	5	[12]
(United Kingdom) K Boulter (Australia) D Kasatkina	6^{4}	7	[10]
(Japan) S Aoyama (Spain) C Bucșa	7	5	[10]
6	(Kazakhstan) A Danilina; I Khromacheva	5	7	[12]
3	(Chinese Taipei) S-w Hsieh (Latvia) J Ostapenko	6	6
(Slovakia) T Mihalíková (United Kingdom) O Nicholls	2	2
(Ukraine) N Kichenok (China) Y Xu	6	6
A Panova (Hungary) F Stollár	0	3
(Brazil) B Haddad Maia (Germany) L Siegemund	6	6
(China) Xin Wang (China) S Zheng	4	2
(United States) N Melichar-Martinez; L Samsonova	6^{4}	7^{7}	[10]
5	M Andreeva; D Shnaider	7^{7}	6^{3}	[12]

Second round
(Romania) S Cîrstea; A Kalinskaya	7	7
(Norway) U Eikeri (Japan) E Hozumi	5	5
(Czech Republic) L Nosková (Denmark) C Tauson	3	6	[10]
6	(Kazakhstan) A Danilina; I Khromacheva	6	4	[7]
3	(Chinese Taipei) S-w Hsieh (Latvia) J Ostapenko	6	7^{7}
(Ukraine) N Kichenok (China) Y Xu	1	6^{5}
(Brazil) B Haddad Maia (Germany) L Siegemund	0	7^{7}	[10]
5	M Andreeva; D Shnaider	6	6^{4}	[8]

Quarterfinals
(Romania) S Cîrstea; A Kalinskaya	6	6
(Czech Republic) L Nosková (Denmark) C Tauson	0	3
3	(Chinese Taipei) S-w Hsieh (Latvia) J Ostapenko	7	6
(Brazil) B Haddad Maia (Germany) L Siegemund	5	3

Semifinals
(Romania) S Cîrstea; A Kalinskaya	7^{7}	6
3	(Chinese Taipei) S-w Hsieh (Latvia) J Ostapenko	6^{2}	4

=== Bottom half ===
First round
7	(United States) A Muhammad (Netherlands) D Schuurs	4	4
WC	V Azarenka (United States) A Krueger	6	6
E Alexandrova (United States) P Stearns	6^{6}	6	[10]
A Blinkova (Chinese Taipei) F-h Wu	7^{8}	2	[4]
PR	(Australia) S Hunter (Australia) E Perez	6^{5}	6	[11]
(Canada) L Fernandez (Kazakhstan) Y Putintseva	7^{7}	4	[9]
WC	(United States) C Gauff (United States) R Montgomery	6	6
4	(United States) C Dolehide (United States) D Krawczyk	3	0
8	(United States) S Kenin (Ukraine) L Kichenok	7	6
(Romania) M Niculescu (Poland) K Piter	5	3
WC	(United States) M Keys (Greece) M Sakkari	7^{7}	4	[10]
(Poland) M Linette (Slovakia) R Šramková	6^{3}	6	[6]
V Kudermetova (Belgium) E Mertens	6	6
(Japan) M Kato (Indonesia) A Sutjiadi	3	3
(Chinese Taipei) H-c Chan (Mexico) G Olmos	4	7^{7}	[6]
2	(Italy) S Errani (Italy) J Paolini	6	6^{3}	[10]

Second round
WC	V Azarenka (United States) A Krueger	6	4	[10]
E Alexandrova (United States) P Stearns	3	6	[5]
PR	(Australia) S Hunter (Australia) E Perez	4	3
WC	(United States) C Gauff (United States) R Montgomery	6	6
8	(United States) S Kenin (Ukraine) L Kichenok	6	6
WC	(United States) M Keys (Greece) M Sakkari	3	4
V Kudermetova (Belgium) E Mertens	6	6
2	(Italy) S Errani (Italy) J Paolini	1	3

Quarterfinals
WC	V Azarenka (United States) A Krueger	7^{7}	6
WC	(United States) C Gauff (United States) R Montgomery	6^{5}	3
8	(United States) S Kenin (Ukraine) L Kichenok	3	1
V Kudermetova (Belgium) E Mertens	6	6

Semifinals
WC	V Azarenka (United States) A Krueger	6	4	[8]
V Kudermetova (Belgium) E Mertens	4	6	[10]

== Seeded teams ==
The following are the seeded teams. Seedings are based on WTA rankings as of 14 April 2025.

Country	Player	Country	Player	Rank	Seed
CAN	Gabriela Dabrowski	NZL	Erin Routliffe	8	1
ITA	Sara Errani	ITA	Jasmine Paolini	12	2
TPE	Hsieh Su-wei	LAT	Jeļena Ostapenko	14	3
USA	Caroline Dolehide	USA	Desirae Krawczyk	30	4
	Mirra Andreeva		Diana Shnaider	31	5
KAZ	Anna Danilina		Irina Khromacheva	34	6
USA	Asia Muhammad	NED	Demi Schuurs	34	7
USA	Sofia Kenin	UKR	Lyudmyla Kichenok	46	8

== Other entry information ==
=== Wildcards ===
- Victoria Azarenka / (United States) Ashlyn Krueger
- (United States) Coco Gauff / (United States) Robin Montgomery
- (United States) Madison Keys / (Greece) Maria Sakkari

=== Protected ranking ===
- (Australia) Storm Hunter / (Australia) Ellen Perez
