= 2025 Mutua Madrid Open – Women's singles =

Women's singles
- 2025 Mutua Madrid Open

Final
- Champion: Aryna Sabalenka
- Runner-up: (United States) Coco Gauff
- Score: 6–3, 7–6^{(7–3)}

Details
- Draw: 96 (12Q, 8WC)
- Seeds: 32

Events
Singles	men	women
Doubles	men	women
- Madrid Open

Aryna Sabalenka defeated Coco Gauff in the final, 6–3, 7–6^{(7–3)} to win the women's singles tennis title at the 2025 Madrid Open. It was her third Madrid Open title, ninth WTA 1000 title, and 20th career WTA Tour title. Sabalenka was the second woman to win three singles titles at the tournament since its establishment in 2009, equaling Petra Kvitová.

Iga Świątek was the defending champion, but lost in the semifinals to Gauff.

== Seeds ==
All seeds received a bye into the second round.

1. Aryna Sabalenka (champion)
2. (Poland) Iga Świątek (semifinals)
3. (United States) Jessica Pegula (third round)
4. (United States) Coco Gauff (final)
5. (United States) Madison Keys (quarterfinals)
6. (Italy) Jasmine Paolini (third round)
7. Mirra Andreeva (quarterfinals)
8. (China) Zheng Qinwen (second round)
9. (Spain) Paula Badosa (withdrew)
10. (Kazakhstan) Elena Rybakina (third round)
11. (United States) Emma Navarro (third round)
12. (Czech Republic) Karolína Muchová (withdrew)
13. Diana Shnaider (fourth round)
14. (Australia) Daria Kasatkina (third round)
15. (United States) Amanda Anisimova (second round)
16. (Brazil) Beatriz Haddad Maia (third round)
17. (Ukraine) Elina Svitolina (semifinals)
18. Liudmila Samsonova (third round)
19. (Croatia) Donna Vekić (fourth round)
20. (Denmark) Clara Tauson (second round)
21. Ekaterina Alexandrova (fourth round)
22. (Kazakhstan) Yulia Putintseva (second round)
23. (Latvia) Jeļena Ostapenko (second round)
24. (Ukraine) Marta Kostyuk (quarterfinals)
25. (Canada) Leylah Fernandez (second round)
26. (Tunisia) Ons Jabeur (second round)
27. (Poland) Magdalena Fręch (third round)
28. (Belgium) Elise Mertens (third round)
29. (Poland) Magda Linette (second round)
30. Anna Kalinskaya (third round)
31. (Czech Republic) Linda Nosková (third round)
32. (United States) Sofia Kenin (third round)

Click on the seed number of a player to go to their draw section.

== Draw ==
Key

- Q = Qualifier
- WC = Wild card
- LL = Lucky loser
- Alt = Alternate
- ITF = ITF entry
- PR = Protected ranking
- SR = Special ranking
- SE = Special exempt
- JE = Junior exempt
- JR = Junior Accelerator Programme entrant
- CO = College Accelerator Programme entrant
- NG = Next Gen Accelerator Program entrant
- w/o = Walkover
- r = Retired
- d = Defaulted

=== Finals ===
Quarterfinals
1	Aryna Sabalenka	7^{7}	7^{9}
24	(Ukraine) Marta Kostyuk	6^{4}	6^{7}
(Japan) Moyuka Uchijima	2	1
17	(Ukraine) Elina Svitolina	6	6
7	Mirra Andreeva	5	1
4	(United States) Coco Gauff	7	6
5	(United States) Madison Keys	6	3	2
2	(Poland) Iga Świątek	0	6	6

Semifinals
1	Aryna Sabalenka	6	7
17	(Ukraine) Elina Svitolina	3	5
4	(United States) Coco Gauff	6	6
2	(Poland) Iga Świątek	1	1

Final
1	Aryna Sabalenka	6	7^{7}
4	(United States) Coco Gauff	3	6^{3}

=== Top half ===
==== Section 1 ====
First round
Q	A Blinkova	6	6
Q	(Hungary) P Udvardy	4	2
WC	(Colombia) E Arango	3	3
(Colombia) C Osorio	6	6
WC	(Australia) A Tomljanović	3	6	5
Q	(Switzerland) R Masarova	6	1	7
(United States) P Stearns	5	6	6
(Australia) K Birrell	7	3	4

Second round
1	A Sabalenka	6	6
Q	A Blinkova	3	4
(Colombia) C Osorio	3	3
28	(Belgium) E Mertens	6	6
22	(Kazakhstan) Y Putintseva	3	3
Q	(Switzerland) R Masarova	6	6
(United States) P Stearns	6	2	7
15	(United States) A Anisimova	2	6	5

Third round
1	A Sabalenka	3	6	6
28	(Belgium) E Mertens	6	2	1
Q	(Switzerland) R Masarova	2	0
(United States) P Stearns	6	6

Fourth round
1	A Sabalenka	6	6
(United States) P Stearns	2	4

==== Section 2 ====
First round
V Kudermetova	6	6
P Kudermetova	2	2
(Netherlands) S Lamens	6^{4}	4
(United Kingdom) E Raducanu	7^{7}	6
(New Zealand) L Sun	3	6	6
(France) V Gracheva	6	1	4
(United States) A Krueger	7^{9}	4	2
A Potapova	6^{7}	6	6

Second round
LL	(Spain) C Bucșa	6	6^{1}	5
V Kudermetova	4	7^{7}	7
(United Kingdom) E Raducanu	4	6	2
24	(Ukraine) M Kostyuk	6	2	6
32	(United States) S Kenin	6	6
(New Zealand) L Sun	3	2
A Potapova	6	6
8	(China) Q Zheng	4	4

Third round
V Kudermetova	0	6	4
24	(Ukraine) M Kostyuk	6	4	6
32	(United States) S Kenin	6	4	6^{6}
A Potapova	3	6	7^{8}

Fourth round
24	(Ukraine) M Kostyuk	6	6
A Potapova	3	2

==== Section 3 ====
First round
(Germany) E Lys	6	6
Q	(Serbia) T Kostović	2	2
(Japan) M Uchijima	1	6	6
WC	(United States) R Montgomery	6	4	3
V Azarenka	4	2
(Serbia) O Danilović	6	6
(United States) A Parks	6	6
WC	(Andorra) V Jiménez Kasintseva	3	3

Second round
3	(United States) J Pegula	6	6
(Germany) E Lys	2	2
(Japan) M Uchijima	4	6	6
26	(Tunisia) O Jabeur	6	3	4
21	E Alexandrova	6	6
(Serbia) O Danilović	3	4
(United States) A Parks	2	5
14	(Australia) D Kasatkina	6	7

Third round
3	(United States) J Pegula	3	2
(Japan) M Uchijima	6	6
21	E Alexandrova	6	7^{7}
14	(Australia) D Kasatkina	3	6^{3}

Fourth round
(Japan) M Uchijima	6	7^{7}
21	E Alexandrova	4	6^{5}

==== Section 4 ====
First round
(United States) M Kessler	2	4
PR	(Canada) B Andreescu	6	6
(Romania) J Cristian	2	5
(United Kingdom) S Kartal	6	7
(China) Xin Wang	4	6^{7}
(Greece) M Sakkari	6	7^{9}
(United Kingdom) K Boulter	4	6	6
(Czech Republic) K Siniaková	6	2	1

Second round
10	(Kazakhstan) E Rybakina	6	6
PR	(Canada) B Andreescu	3	2
(United Kingdom) S Kartal	3	1
17	(Ukraine) E Svitolina	6	6
29	(Poland) M Linette	6^{5}	3
(Greece) M Sakkari	7^{7}	6
(United Kingdom) K Boulter	1	2
6	(Italy) J Paolini	6	6

Third round
10	(Kazakhstan) E Rybakina	3	4
17	(Ukraine) E Svitolina	6	6
(Greece) M Sakkari	6	6
6	(Italy) J Paolini	2	1

Fourth round
17	(Ukraine) E Svitolina	6	6
(Greece) M Sakkari	3	4

=== Bottom half ===
==== Section 5 ====
First round
(Mexico) R Zarazúa	2	6	1
(Czech Republic) M Bouzková	6	4	6
(Spain) J Bouzas Maneiro	6	6
(Egypt) M Sherif	3	1
(Armenia) E Avanesyan	4	4
(United States) C Dolehide	6	6
Q	(Ukraine) Y Starodubtseva	6	6
WC	(Czech Republic) L Fruhvirtová	2	2

Second round
7	M Andreeva	6	6
(Czech Republic) M Bouzková	3	4
(Spain) J Bouzas Maneiro	7	6^{2}	4
27	(Poland) M Fręch	5	7^{7}	6
18	L Samsonova	6	6
(United States) C Dolehide	4	4
Q	(Ukraine) Y Starodubtseva	7^{7}	6
LL	(Italy) E Cocciaretto	6^{5}	4

Third round
7	M Andreeva	7	6
27	(Poland) M Fręch	5	3
18	L Samsonova	6	6^{2}	0
Q	(Ukraine) Y Starodubtseva	2	7^{7}	6

Fourth round
7	M Andreeva	6	6
Q	(Ukraine) Y Starodubtseva	1	4

==== Section 6 ====
First round
LL	(United States) B Pera	6	6
Q	(Croatia) J Fett	4	3
(Switzerland) B Bencic	6	6
Q	(Turkey) Z Sönmez	0	2
Q	A Sasnovich	3	2
(United States) A Li	6	6
Q	(United Kingdom) F Jones	6^{5}	6	3
(Ukraine) D Yastremska	7^{7}	4	6

Second round
16	(Brazil) B Haddad Maia	2	6	6
LL	(United States) B Pera	6	3	1
(Switzerland) B Bencic	7	7
20	(Denmark) C Tauson	5	5
25	(Canada) L Fernandez	4	6	4
(United States) A Li	6	3	6
(Ukraine) D Yastremska	6	2	5
4	(United States) C Gauff	0	6	7

Third round
16	(Brazil) B Haddad Maia	3	6	6^{2}
(Switzerland) B Bencic	6	4	7^{7}
(United States) A Li	2	3
4	(United States) C Gauff	6	6

Fourth round
(Switzerland) B Bencic	4	2
4	(United States) C Gauff	6	6

==== Section 7 ====
First round
(Japan) N Osaka	4	6	4
(Italy) L Bronzetti	6	2	6
Q	(France) D Parry	6	6
(Romania) I-C Begu	3	4
PR	(Romania) S Cîrstea	2	7	6^{4}
WC	(United States) H Baptiste	6	5	7^{7}
Q	(Australia) M Joint	6	2	6
WC	(Spain) C Martínez Círez	2	6	4

Second round
5	(United States) M Keys	6	6
(Italy) L Bronzetti	4	3
Q	(France) D Parry	6^{4}	4
30	A Kalinskaya	7^{7}	6
19	(Croatia) D Vekić	6	6
WC	(United States) H Baptiste	4	3
Q	(Australia) M Joint	5	5
11	(United States) E Navarro	7	7

Third round
5	(United States) M Keys	7	7^{7}
30	A Kalinskaya	5	6^{3}
19	(Croatia) D Vekić	4	6	6
11	(United States) E Navarro	6	3	2

Fourth round
5	(United States) M Keys	6	6
19	(Croatia) D Vekić	2	3

==== Section 8 ====
First round
(United States) K Volynets	6	6
PR	(Czech Republic) P Kvitová	4	0
PR	(Latvia) A Sevastova	6	7
A Pavlyuchenkova	4	5
Q	(Argentina) ML Carlé	6	6
(Slovakia) R Šramková	3	2
(Bulgaria) V Tomova	3	2
WC	(Philippines) A Eala	6	6

Second round
13	D Shnaider	6	6
(United States) K Volynets	1	2
PR	(Latvia) A Sevastova	7^{7}	6
23	(Latvia) J Ostapenko	6^{2}	2
31	(Czech Republic) L Nosková	7	6
Q	(Argentina) ML Carlé	5	1
WC	(Philippines) A Eala	6	4	2
2	(Poland) I Świątek	4	6	6

Third round
13	D Shnaider	6	6
PR	(Latvia) A Sevastova	0	0
31	(Czech Republic) L Nosková	4	2
2	(Poland) I Świątek	6	6

Fourth round
13	D Shnaider	0	7^{7}	4
2	(Poland) I Świątek	6	6^{3}	6

== Seeded players ==
The following are the seeded players. Seedings are based on WTA rankings as of 14 April 2025. Rankings and points before are as of 21 April 2025.

Under the 2025 Rulebook, points from six of the seven combined WTA 1000 tournaments (which include Madrid) are required to be counted in a player's ranking.

Seed	Rank	Player	Points before	Points defending	Points earned	Points after	Status
1	1	Aryna Sabalenka	10,768	650	1,000	11,118	Champion, defeated (United States) Coco Gauff [4]
2	2	(Poland) Iga Świątek	7,383	1,000	390	6,773	Semifinals lost to (United States) Coco Gauff [4]
3	3	(United States) Jessica Pegula	6,208	(30)^{†}	65	6,243	Third round lost to (Japan) Moyuka Uchijima
4	4	(United States) Coco Gauff	6,073	120	650	6,603	Runner-up, lost to Aryna Sabalenka [1]
5	5	(United States) Madison Keys	4,999	390	215	4,824	Quarterfinals lost to (Poland) Iga Świątek [2]
6	6	(Italy) Jasmine Paolini	4,930	120	65	4,875	Third round lost to (Greece) Maria Sakkari
7	7	Mirra Andreeva	4,781	215	215	4,781	Quarterfinals lost to (United States) Coco Gauff [4]
8	8	(China) Zheng Qinwen	4,193	10	10	4,193	Second round lost to Anastasia Potapova
9	9	(Spain) Paula Badosa	3,821	(60)^{‡}	0	3,761	Withdrew due to back injury
10	11	(Kazakhstan) Elena Rybakina	3,308	390	65	2,983	Third round lost to (Ukraine) Elina Svitolina [17]
11	10	(United States) Emma Navarro	3,797	65	65	3,797	Third round lost to (Croatia) Donna Vekić [19]
12	12	(Czech Republic) Karolína Muchová	2,919	(0)^{†}	0	2,919	Withdrew due to illness
13	13	Diana Shnaider	2,913	10	120	3,023	Fourth round lost to (Poland) Iga Świątek [2]
14	14	(Australia) Daria Kasatkina	2,741	120	65	2,686	Third round lost to Ekaterina Alexandrova [21]
15	16	(United States) Amanda Anisimova	2,617	10	10	2,617	Second round lost to (United States) Peyton Stearns
16	19	(Brazil) Beatriz Haddad Maia	2,209	215	65	2,059	Third round lost to (Switzerland) Belinda Bencic
17	17	(Ukraine) Elina Svitolina	2,430	10	390	2,810	Semifinals lost to Aryna Sabalenka [1]
18	20	Liudmila Samsonova	2,150	65	65	2,150	Third round lost to (Ukraine) Yuliia Starodubtseva [Q]
19	21	(Croatia) Donna Vekić	2,141	35	120	2,226	Fourth round lost to (United States) Madison Keys [5]
20	23	(Denmark) Clara Tauson	2,035	2	10	2,043	Second round lost to (Switzerland) Belinda Bencic
21	22	Ekaterina Alexandrova	2,048	10	120	2,158	Fourth round lost to (Japan) Moyuka Uchijima
22	24	(Kazakhstan) Yulia Putintseva	1,873	215	10	1,668	Second round lost to (Switzerland) Rebeka Masarova [Q]
23	18	(Latvia) Jeļena Ostapenko	2,345	120	10	2,235	Second round lost to (Latvia) Anastasija Sevastova [PR]
24	36	(Ukraine) Marta Kostyuk	1,481	10	215	1,686	Quarterfinals lost to Aryna Sabalenka [1]
25	25	(Canada) Leylah Fernandez	1,763	65	10	1,708	Second round lost to (United States) Ann Li
26	28	(Tunisia) Ons Jabeur	1,663	215	10	1,458	Second round lost to (Japan) Moyuka Uchijima
27	27	(Poland) Magdalena Fręch	1,745	10	65	1,800	Third round lost to Mirra Andreeva [7]
28	26	(Belgium) Elise Mertens	1,756	10	65	1,811	Third round lost to Aryna Sabalenka [1]
29	33	(Poland) Magda Linette	1,556	35	(30)^{§}	1,551	Second round lost to (Greece) Maria Sakkari
30	29	Anna Kalinskaya	1,619	10	65	1,674	Third round lost to (United States) Madison Keys [5]
31	31	(Czech Republic) Linda Nosková	1,573	10	65	1,628	Third round lost to (Poland) Iga Świątek [2]
32	32	(United States) Sofia Kenin	1,563	10	65	1,618	Third round lost to Anastasia Potapova

† The player withdrew from the 2024 tournament but was not required to carry a 0-point penalty in her ranking due to a long-term injury exemption. Points from her 18th best result will be deducted instead.
‡ The player is defending points from her 18th best result.
§ The player is substituting her next best result as it is higher than the Madrid result, which does not need to be counted in her rankings.

=== Withdrawn seeded players ===
The following players would have been seeded, but withdrew before the tournament began.

Rank	Player	Points before	Points dropping	Points after	Withdrawal reason
15	(Czech Republic) Barbora Krejčíková	2,674	10	2,664	Back injury
30	(United States) Danielle Collins	1,581	120	1,461	

== Other entry information ==
=== Wildcards ===
- (Colombia) Emiliana Arango
- (United States) Hailey Baptiste
- (Philippines) Alexandra Eala
- (Czech Republic) Linda Fruhvirtová
- (Andorra) Victoria Jiménez Kasintseva
- (Spain) Carlota Martínez Círez
- (United States) Robin Montgomery
- (Australia) Ajla Tomljanović

=== Protected ranking ===
- (Canada) Bianca Andreescu
- (Romania) Sorana Cîrstea
- (Czech Republic) Petra Kvitová
- (Latvia) Anastasija Sevastova

=== Withdrawals ===
- § (Spain) Paula Badosa → replaced by (Spain) Cristina Bucșa
- ‡ (United States) Danielle Collins → replaced by (Germany) Eva Lys
- § (Ukraine) Anhelina Kalinina → replaced by (United States) Bernarda Pera
- ‡ (Czech Republic) Barbora Krejčíková → replaced by (United States) Katie Volynets
- § (Czech Republic) Karolína Muchová → replaced by (Italy) Elisabetta Cocciaretto
- ‡ (Czech Republic) Markéta Vondroušová → replaced by (United States) Caroline Dolehide

‡ – withdrew from entry list
§ – withdrew from main draw

== Qualifying ==
=== Seeds ===
1. Anna Blinkova (qualified)
2. (United States) Bernarda Pera (qualifying competition, lucky loser)
3. (Turkey) Zeynep Sönmez (qualified)
4. (Australia) Maya Joint (qualified)
5. (Germany) Tatjana Maria (first round)
6. Kamilla Rakhimova (first round)
7. (Netherlands) Arantxa Rus (first round)
8. (Romania) Anca Todoni (first round, retired)
9. (Italy) Elisabetta Cocciaretto (qualifying competition, lucky loser)
10. (Romania) Elena-Gabriela Ruse (first round)
11. (Australia) Olivia Gadecki (first round)
12. (Spain) Cristina Bucșa (qualifying competition, lucky loser)
13. (Germany) Laura Siegemund (first round)
14. (Switzerland) Jil Teichmann (qualifying competition)
15. Erika Andreeva (first round)
16. (Hungary) Anna Bondár (first round)
17. (Ukraine) Yuliia Starodubtseva (qualified)
18. Anastasia Zakharova (first round)
19. (United Kingdom) Harriet Dart (first round)
20. Aliaksandra Sasnovich (qualified)
21. (Spain) Nuria Párrizas Díaz (first round)
22. (France) Diane Parry (qualified)
23. (Croatia) Antonia Ružić (qualifying competition)
24. (Argentina) María Lourdes Carlé (qualified)

=== Qualifiers ===
1. Anna Blinkova
2. (Argentina) María Lourdes Carlé
3. (Turkey) Zeynep Sönmez
4. (Australia) Maya Joint
5. Aliaksandra Sasnovich
6. (Croatia) Jana Fett
7. (Switzerland) Rebeka Masarova
8. (Ukraine) Yuliia Starodubtseva
9. (France) Diane Parry
10. (Serbia) Teodora Kostović
11. (Hungary) Panna Udvardy
12. (United Kingdom) Francesca Jones

=== Lucky losers ===
1. (United States) Bernarda Pera
2. (Italy) Elisabetta Cocciaretto
3. (Spain) Cristina Bucșa

=== Qualifying draw ===
==== First qualifier ====
First round
1	Anna Blinkova	6	6
WC	(Spain) Neus Torner Sensano	3	3
WC	(Spain) Kaitlin Quevedo	6	6
21	(Spain) Nuria Párrizas Díaz	2	4

Qualifying competition
1	Anna Blinkova	6	7^{9}
WC	(Spain) Kaitlin Quevedo	4	6^{7}

==== Second qualifier ====
First round
2	(United States) Bernarda Pera	6	6
WC	(Spain) Ruth Roura Llaverias	2	4
(Ukraine) Daria Snigur	7	6^{7}	4
24	(Argentina) María Lourdes Carlé	5	7^{9}	6

Qualifying competition
2	(United States) Bernarda Pera	6^{4}	2
24	(Argentina) María Lourdes Carlé	7^{7}	6

==== Third qualifier ====
First round
3	(Turkey) Zeynep Sönmez	7^{10}	6
(Spain) Leyre Romero Gormaz	6^{8}	3
(United States) Varvara Lepchenko	6	6^{3}	6
19	(United Kingdom) Harriet Dart	4	7^{7}	3

Qualifying competition
3	(Turkey) Zeynep Sönmez	6	6
(United States) Varvara Lepchenko	2	2

==== Fourth qualifier ====
First round
4	(Australia) Maya Joint	6	2	6
(Italy) Sara Errani	4	6	2
PR	(Belgium) Yanina Wickmayer	1	2
14	(Switzerland) Jil Teichmann	6	6

Qualifying competition
4	(Australia) Maya Joint	7^{7}	6
14	(Switzerland) Jil Teichmann	6^{2}	1

==== Fifth qualifier ====
First round
5	(Germany) Tatjana Maria	3	3
WC	(Italy) Tyra Caterina Grant	6	6
PR	(Sweden) Mirjam Björklund	3	1
20	Aliaksandra Sasnovich	6	6

Qualifying competition
WC	(Italy) Tyra Caterina Grant	1	5
20	Aliaksandra Sasnovich	6	7

==== Sixth qualifier ====
First round
6	Kamilla Rakhimova	3	3
(Croatia) Jana Fett	6	6
WC	(Spain) Ariana Geerlings	4	2
23	(Croatia) Antonia Ružić	6	6

Qualifying competition
(Croatia) Jana Fett	6	3	6
23	(Croatia) Antonia Ružić	2	6	4

==== Seventh qualifier ====
First round
7	(Netherlands) Arantxa Rus	1	5
(Switzerland) Rebeka Masarova	6	7
(Czech Republic) Sára Bejlek	7	6
16	(Hungary) Anna Bondár	5	3

Qualifying competition
(Switzerland) Rebeka Masarova	6	5	6
(Czech Republic) Sára Bejlek	2	7	2

==== Eighth qualifier ====
First round
8	(Romania) Anca Todoni	3^{r}
(France) Elsa Jacquemot	3
(France) Chloé Paquet	6	3	0
17	(Ukraine) Yuliia Starodubtseva	2	6	6

Qualifying competition
(France) Elsa Jacquemot	6^{5}	6	5
17	(Ukraine) Yuliia Starodubtseva	7^{7}	2	7

==== Ninth qualifier ====
First round
9	(Italy) Elisabetta Cocciaretto	6	6
(Australia) Priscilla Hon	2	1
Oksana Selekhmeteva	2	5
22	(France) Diane Parry	6	7

Qualifying competition
9	(Italy) Elisabetta Cocciaretto	2	2
22	(France) Diane Parry	6	6

==== Tenth qualifier ====
First round
10	(Romania) Elena-Gabriela Ruse	4	6	6^{3}
WC	(Serbia) Teodora Kostović	6	2	7^{7}
(Italy) Lucrezia Stefanini	7	6
15	Erika Andreeva	5	4

Qualifying competition
WC	(Serbia) Teodora Kostović	6	6
(Italy) Lucrezia Stefanini	2	2

==== Eleventh qualifier ====
First round
11	(Australia) Olivia Gadecki	7^{7}	5	1
(Hungary) Panna Udvardy	6^{2}	7	6
(Germany) Jule Niemeier	6	7
18	Anastasia Zakharova	3	5

Qualifying competition
(Hungary) Panna Udvardy	6	6
(Germany) Jule Niemeier	2	3

==== Twelfth qualifier ====
First round
12	(Spain) Cristina Bucșa	7	6
(Poland) Maja Chwalińska	5	0
(United Kingdom) Francesca Jones	6	6
13	(Germany) Laura Siegemund	4	3

Qualifying competition
12	(Spain) Cristina Bucșa	6^{3}	6	1
(United Kingdom) Francesca Jones	7^{7}	3	6
