= 2025 Bad Homburg Open – Doubles =

Doubles
- 2025 Bad Homburg Open

Final
- Champions: (China) Guo Hanyu; Alexandra Panova
- Runners-up: (Ukraine) Lyudmyla Kichenok (Australia) Ellen Perez
- Score: 4−6, 7−6^{(7−4)}, [10−5]

Events
Singles	Doubles
← 2024 ·	Bad Homburg Open	· 2026 →

Guo Hanyu and Alexandra Panova defeated Lyudmyla Kichenok and Ellen Perez in the final, 4−6, 7−6^{(7−4)}, [10−5] to win the women's doubles tennis title at the 2025 Bad Homburg Open.

Nicole Melichar-Martinez and Perez were the defending champions, but chose to compete with different partners. Melichar-Martinez partnered Nadiia Kichenok, but lost in the quarterfinals to Guo and Panova.

== Seeds ==
1. (Canada) Gabriela Dabrowski / (New Zealand) Erin Routliffe (first round)
2. (Ukraine) Lyudmyla Kichenok / (Australia) Ellen Perez (final)
3. (United States) Asia Muhammad / (Netherlands) Demi Schuurs (first round)
4. (Hungary) Tímea Babos / (Brazil) Luisa Stefani (semifinals)

== Draw ==
=== Key ===
- Q = Qualifier
- WC = Wild card
- LL = Lucky loser
- Alt = Alternate
- ITF = ITF entry
- PR = Protected ranking
- SR = Special ranking
- SE = Special exempt
- JE = Junior exempt
- JR = Junior Accelerator Programme entrant
- CO = College Accelerator Programme entrant
- NG = Next Gen Accelerator Program entrant
- w/o = Walkover
- r = Retired
- d = Defaulted

=== Draw ===
First round
1	(Canada) G Dabrowski (New Zealand) E Routliffe	7^{9}	5	[8]
(China) X Jiang (Chinese Taipei) F-h Wu	6^{7}	7	[10]
(China) Y Xu (China) Z Yang	7^{7}	7
Alt	(Germany) T Morderger (Germany) Y Morderger	6^{4}	5
3	(United States) A Muhammad (Netherlands) D Schuurs	6	5	[6]
(Ukraine) N Kichenok (United States) N Melichar-Martinez	4	7	[10]
(China) H Guo; A Panova	6	6
I Khromacheva (Hungary) F Stollár	3	4
(Czech Republic) A Dețiuc (Netherlands) B Schoofs	6^{0}	6	[7]
(Norway) U Eikeri (Japan) M Ninomiya	7^{7}	3	[10]
(Slovakia) T Mihalíková (United Kingdom) O Nicholls	3	6^{4}
4	(Hungary) T Babos (Brazil) L Stefani	6	7^{7}
WC	(United States) C McNally (Germany) N Schunk	2	0
(Chinese Taipei) H-c Chan (Denmark) C Tauson	6	6
(Netherlands) I Haverlag (Brazil) I Martins	6^{3}	7	[8]
2	(Ukraine) L Kichenok (Australia) E Perez	7^{7}	5	[10]

Quarterfinals
(China) X Jiang (Chinese Taipei) F-h Wu	4	7^{7}	[5]
(China) Y Xu (China) Z Yang	6	6^{3}	[10]
(Ukraine) N Kichenok (United States) N Melichar-Martinez	6	6^{2}	[10]
(China) H Guo; A Panova	4	7^{7}	[12]
(Norway) U Eikeri (Japan) M Ninomiya	4	2
4	(Hungary) T Babos (Brazil) L Stefani	6	6
(Chinese Taipei) H-c Chan (Denmark) C Tauson	6	4	[7]
2	(Ukraine) L Kichenok (Australia) E Perez	4	6	[10]

Semifinals
(China) Y Xu (China) Z Yang	3	4
(China) H Guo; A Panova	6	6
4	(Hungary) T Babos (Brazil) L Stefani	3	2
2	(Ukraine) L Kichenok (Australia) E Perez	6	6

Final
(China) H Guo; A Panova	4	7^{7}	[10]
2	(Ukraine) L Kichenok (Australia) E Perez	6	6^{4}	[5]
