= 2025 Bad Homburg Open – Singles =

Singles
- 2025 Bad Homburg Open

Final
- Champion: (United States) Jessica Pegula
- Runner-up: (Poland) Iga Świątek
- Score: 6–4, 7–5

Details
- Draw: 28 (4 Q / 4 WC)
- Seeds: 8

Events
Singles	Doubles
- Bad Homburg Open

Jessica Pegula defeated Iga Świątek in the final, 6–4, 7–5 to win the women's singles tennis title at the 2025 Bad Homburg Open. It was her ninth career WTA Tour singles title.

Diana Shnaider was the defending champion, but lost to Donna Vekić in the first round, in a rematch of the previous year's final.

== Seeds ==
The top four seeds received a bye into the second round.

1. (United States) Jessica Pegula (champion)
2. (Italy) Jasmine Paolini (semifinals)
3. Mirra Andreeva (quarterfinals)
4. (Poland) Iga Świątek (final)
5. (United States) Emma Navarro (quarterfinals)
6. Diana Shnaider (first round)
7. (Ukraine) Elina Svitolina (second round)
8. Ekaterina Alexandrova (quarterfinals)

== Draw ==
Key

- Q = Qualifier
- WC = Wild card
- LL = Lucky loser
- Alt = Alternate
- ITF = ITF entry
- PR = Protected ranking
- SR = Special ranking
- SE = Special exempt
- JE = Junior exempt
- JR = Junior Accelerator Programme entrant
- CO = College Accelerator Programme entrant
- NG = Next Gen Accelerator Program entrant
- w/o = Walkover
- r = Retired
- d = Defaulted

=== Finals ===
Semifinals
1	(United States) Jessica Pegula	6^{2}	7	6
(Czech Republic) Linda Nosková	7^{7}	5	1
4	(Poland) Iga Świątek	6	6
2	(Italy) Jasmine Paolini	1	3

Final
1	(United States) Jessica Pegula	6	7
4	(Poland) Iga Świątek	4	5

=== Top half ===
First round
LL	V Kudermetova	6^{4}	5
Q	(Czech Republic) K Siniaková	7^{7}	7
WC	(Japan) N Osaka	7^{8}	7^{7}
Q	(Serbia) O Danilović	6^{6}	6^{4}
(Ukraine) M Kostyuk	2	5
5	(United States) E Navarro	6	7
(Poland) M Fręch	7^{8}	3	3
(Denmark) C Tauson	6^{6}	6	6
Q	(Australia) A Tomljanović	3	2
(Czech Republic) L Nosková	6	6
(Croatia) D Vekić	6	6
6	D Shnaider	3	3

Second round
1	(United States) J Pegula	6	6
Q	(Czech Republic) K Siniaková	2	3
WC	(Japan) N Osaka	4	4
5	(United States) E Navarro	6	6
3	M Andreeva	3	6	6
(Denmark) C Tauson	6	3	1
(Czech Republic) L Nosková	2	6	6
(Croatia) D Vekić	6	2	4

Quarterfinals
1	(United States) J Pegula	6	1	6
5	(United States) E Navarro	4	6	3
3	M Andreeva	3	3
(Czech Republic) L Nosková	6	6

Semifinals
1	(United States) J Pegula	6^{2}	7	6
(Czech Republic) L Nosková	7^{7}	5	1

=== Bottom half ===
First round
8	E Alexandrova	6	6
PR	(Switzerland) B Bencic	1	2
(Kazakhstan) Y Putintseva	5	6^{6}
WC	(Greece) M Sakkari	7	7^{8}
Q	V Azarenka	6	6
WC	(Germany) L Siegemund	2	2
7	(Ukraine) E Svitolina	7	6
(Belgium) E Mertens	5	4
LL	(United States) A Krueger	1	4
(Brazil) B Haddad Maia	6	6
(Canada) L Fernandez	6	7^{7}
WC	(Germany) T Maria	0	6^{1}

Second round
8	E Alexandrova	6	6^{2}	6
WC	(Greece) M Sakkari	3	7^{7}	3
Q	V Azarenka	4	4
4	(Poland) I Świątek	6	6
7	(Ukraine) E Svitolina	6	4	6^{7}
(Brazil) B Haddad Maia	3	6	7^{9}
(Canada) L Fernandez	6^{8}	6^{6}
2	(Italy) J Paolini	7^{10}	7^{8}

Quarterfinals
8	E Alexandrova	4	6^{5}
4	(Poland) I Świątek	6	7^{7}
(Brazil) B Haddad Maia	5	5
2	(Italy) J Paolini	7	7

Semifinals
4	(Poland) I Świątek	6	6
2	(Italy) J Paolini	1	3

== Qualifying ==
=== Seeds ===
1. (United States) Ashlyn Krueger (qualifying competition, lucky loser)
2. (Serbia) Olga Danilović (qualified)
3. Veronika Kudermetova (qualifying competition, lucky loser)
4. (Germany) Eva Lys (qualifying competition, retired)
5. (Australia) Ajla Tomljanović (qualified)
6. (Ukraine) Yuliia Starodubtseva (qualifying competition)
7. (Czech Republic) Kateřina Siniaková (qualified)
8. Victoria Azarenka (qualified)

=== Qualifiers ===
1. (Czech Republic) Kateřina Siniaková
2. (Serbia) Olga Danilović
3. Victoria Azarenka
4. (Australia) Ajla Tomljanović

=== Lucky losers ===
1. (United States) Ashlyn Krueger
2. Veronika Kudermetova

=== Qualifying draw ===
==== First qualifier ====
First round
1	(United States) Ashlyn Krueger	3	7	6
Maria Timofeeva	6	5	3
(France) Harmony Tan	1	4
7	(Czech Republic) Kateřina Siniaková	6	6

Qualifying competition
1	(United States) Ashlyn Krueger	5	2
7	(Czech Republic) Kateřina Siniaková	7	6

==== Second qualifier ====
First round
2	(Serbia) Olga Danilović	6	7
WC	(Germany) Nastasja Schunk	4	5
PR	Vitalia Diatchenko	6	3	1
6	(Ukraine) Yuliia Starodubtseva	3	6	6

Qualifying competition
2	(Serbia) Olga Danilović	7^{7}	6
6	(Ukraine) Yuliia Starodubtseva	6^{4}	2

==== Third qualifier ====
First round
3	Veronika Kudermetova	6	6
(Netherlands) Arantxa Rus	1	1
(United States) Caty McNally	6	2	0
8	Victoria Azarenka	4	6	6

Qualifying competition
3	Veronika Kudermetova	7^{7}	3	4
8	Victoria Azarenka	6^{4}	6	6

==== Fourth qualifier ====
First round
4	(Germany) Eva Lys	6	4	6
PR	(Croatia) Ana Konjuh	2	6	4
WC	(Romania) Sorana Cîrstea	2	3
5	(Australia) Ajla Tomljanović	6	6

Qualifying competition
4	(Germany) Eva Lys	4	2^{r}
5	(Australia) Ajla Tomljanović	6	3
