= 2025 ATP Finals =

- Date: 9–16 November
- Edition: 56th (singles) / 51st (doubles)
- Category: ATP Finals
- Draw: 8S/8D
- Surface: Hard (indoor)
- Location: Turin, Italy
- Venue: Inalpi Arena

Champions

Singles
- (Italy) Jannik Sinner

Doubles
- (Finland) Harri Heliövaara / (United Kingdom) Henry Patten
- ATP Finals

The 2025 ATP Finals (also known as the 2025 Nitto ATP Finals due to Nitto sponsorship) was a men's tennis tournament which ran from 9 to 16 November 2025. It was played on indoor hard courts at the Inalpi Arena in Turin, Italy for the fifth consecutive time, and was the season-ending event for the highest-ranked singles players and doubles teams on the 2025 ATP Tour. This tournament was the 56th and 51st editions of the singles and doubles events, respectively.

== Champions ==
=== Singles ===
- (Italy) Jannik Sinner def. (Spain) Carlos Alcaraz, 7–6^{(7–4)}, 7–5

=== Doubles ===
- (Finland) Harri Heliövaara / (United Kingdom) Henry Patten def. (United Kingdom) Joe Salisbury / (United Kingdom) Neal Skupski, 7–5, 6–3

== Format ==
The ATP Finals group stage has a round-robin format, with eight players/teams divided into two groups of four and each player/team in a group playing the other three in the group. The eight seeds are determined by the PIF ATP rankings and ATP Doubles Team Rankings on the Monday after the last ATP Tour tournament of the calendar year. All singles matches, including the final, are best of three sets with tie-breaks in each set including the third. All doubles matches are two sets (no ad) and a Match Tie-break.

In deciding placement within a group, the following criteria are used, in order:

1. Most wins.
2. Most matches played (e.g., a 2–1 record beats a 2–0 record).
3. Head-to-head result between tied players/teams.
4. Highest percentage of sets won.
5. Highest percentage of games won.
6. ATP rank after the last ATP Tour tournament of the year.

Criteria 4–6 are used only in the event of a three-way tie; if one of these criteria decided a winner or loser among the three, the remaining two will have been ranked by head-to-head result.

The top two of each group will advance to semifinals, with the winner of each group playing the runner-up of the other group. The winners of the semifinals then will play for the title.

== Prize money, ranking points and trophies ==
The 2025 ATP Finals had a total prize money pool of US$15,500,000, an increase of 1.64% compared to 2024. An undefeated singles champion could earn a maximum of $5,071,000, while an undefeated doubles team could earn $959,300. The tournament awarded the following ranking points and prize money, per victory (doubles prize money is per team):

Stage	Singles	Doubles	Points
Final win	$2,367,000	$356,800	500
Semi-final win	$1,183,500	$178,500	400
Round-robin match win	$396,500	$96,600	200
Participation fee	3 matches = $331,000; 2 matches = $248,250; 1 match = $165,500	3 matches = $134,200; 2 matches = $100,650; 1 match = $67,100	—N/a
Alternates	$155,000	$51,700	—N/a
Undefeated champion	$5,071,000	$959,300	1500

- An undefeated champion would earn the maximum 1,500 ranking points, and $5,071,000 in singles or $959,300 in doubles.

Additional prizes include the ATP Finals trophy and the ATP year-end No. 1 trophy, all made by London-based silversmiths Thomas Lyte.

== Qualification ==
=== Singles ===
Eight players compete at the tournament, with two named alternates. Players receive places in the following order of precedence:

1. First, the top 7 players in the ATP Race to Turin after the final week of the ATP Tour on 8 November 2025
2. Second, up to two 2025 Grand Slam tournament winners ranked anywhere 8th–20th, in ranking order
3. Third, the eighth ranked player in the ATP rankings

In the event of this totaling more than 8 players, those lower down in the selection order become the alternates. If further alternates are needed, these players are selected by the ATP.

Provisional rankings are published weekly as the ATP Race to Turin, coinciding with the 52-week rolling ATP rankings on the date of selection. Points are accumulated in Grand Slam, ATP Tour, United Cup, ATP Challenger Tour and ITF Tour tournaments. Players accrue points across 19 tournaments, usually made up of:

- The 4 Grand Slam tournaments
- The 8 mandatory ATP Masters 1000 tournaments
- The best results from any 7 other tournaments that carry ranking points (Monte-Carlo Masters, United Cup, ATP 500, ATP 250, Challenger, ITF)
- Player can replace up to 3 mandatory Masters 1000 results with a better score from ATP 500 or ATP 250

=== Doubles ===
Eight teams compete at the tournament, with one named alternate. The eight competing teams receive places according to the same order of precedence as in singles. The named alternate will be offered first to any unaccepted teams in the selection order, then to the highest ranked unaccepted team, and then to a team selected by the ATP. Points are accumulated in the same competitions as for the singles tournament. However, for Doubles teams there are no commitment tournaments, so teams are ranked according to their 19 highest points scoring results from any tournaments on the ATP Tour.

== Qualified players ==
=== Singles ===
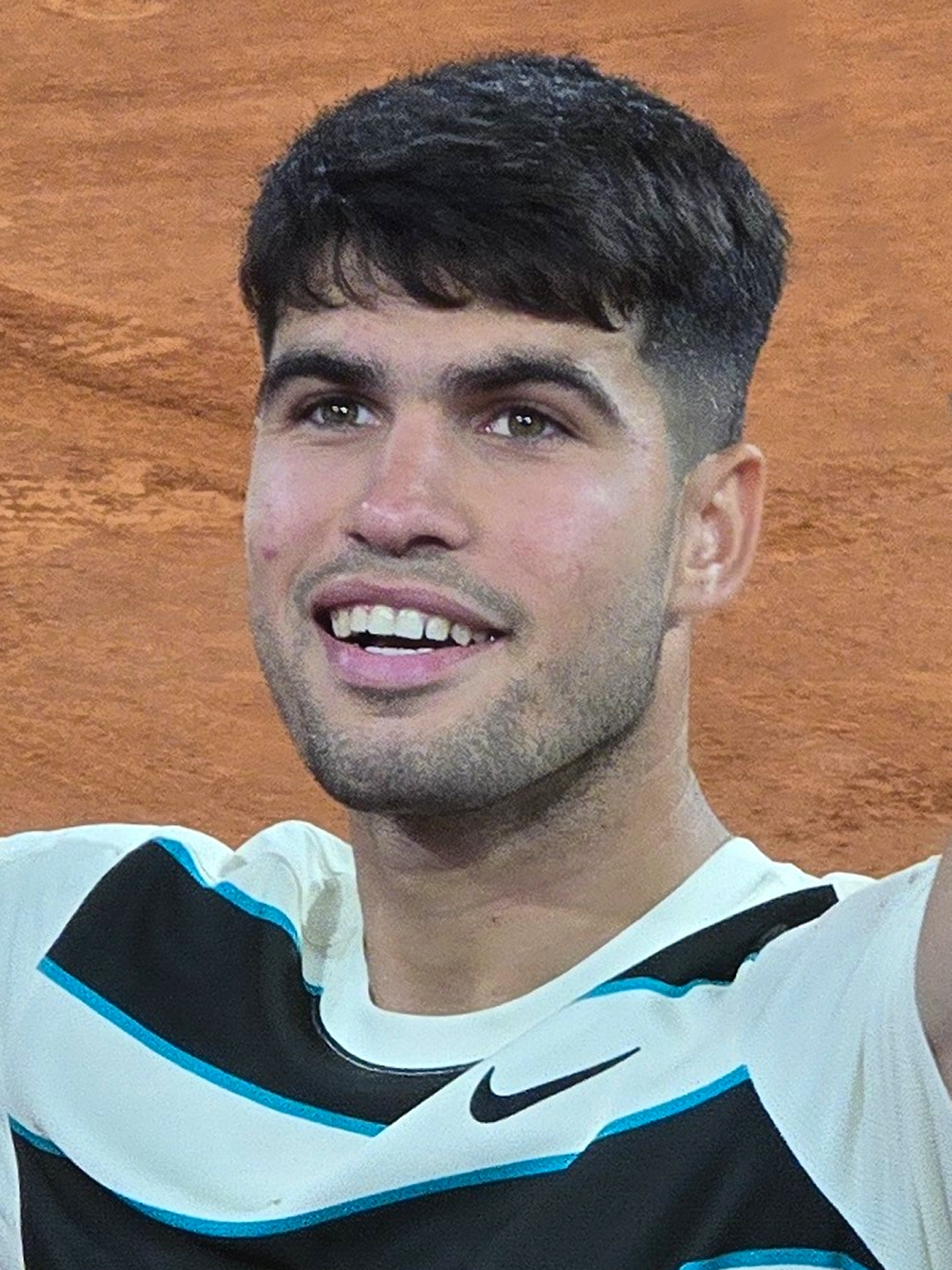
Alcaraz

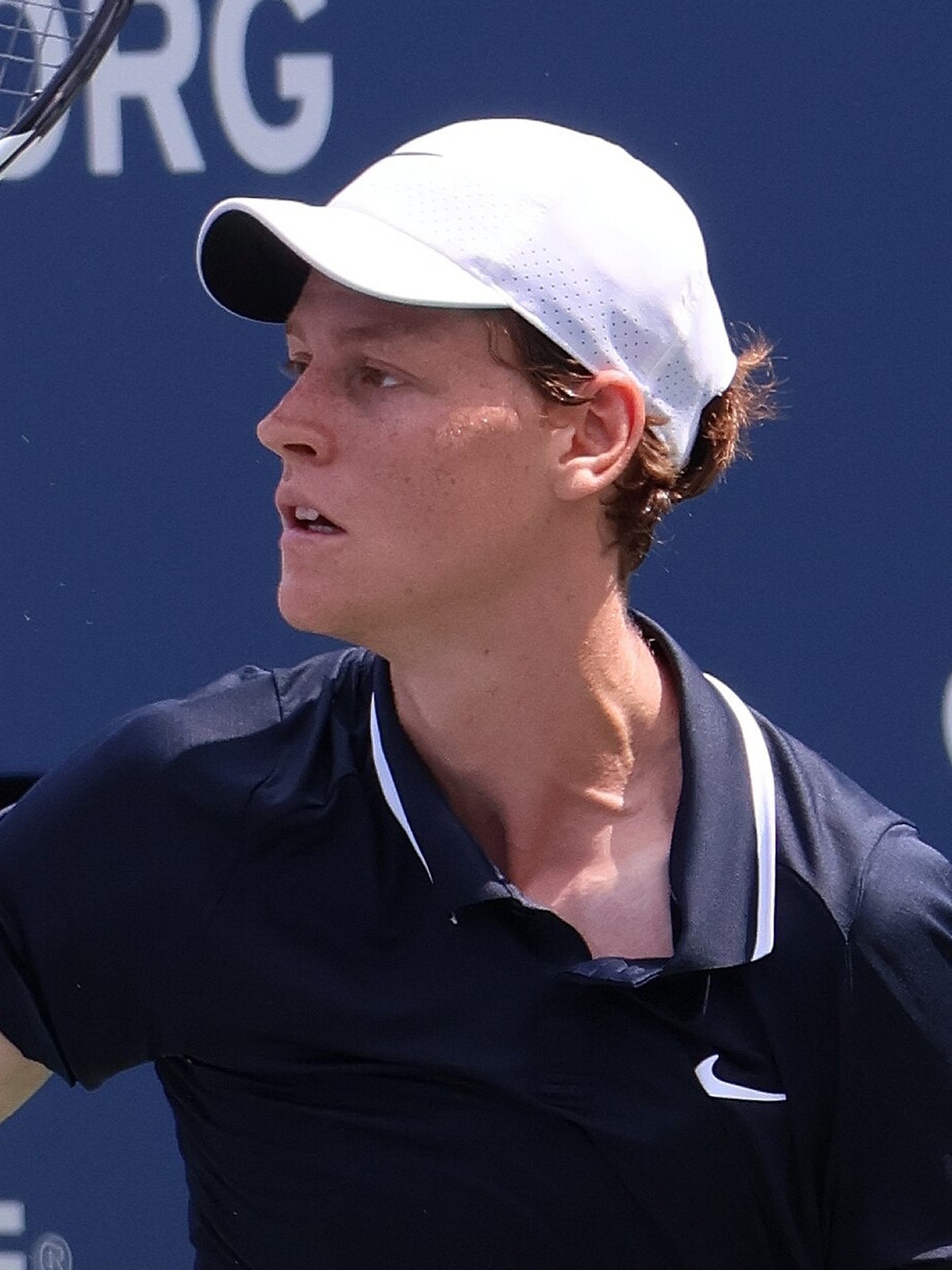
Sinner

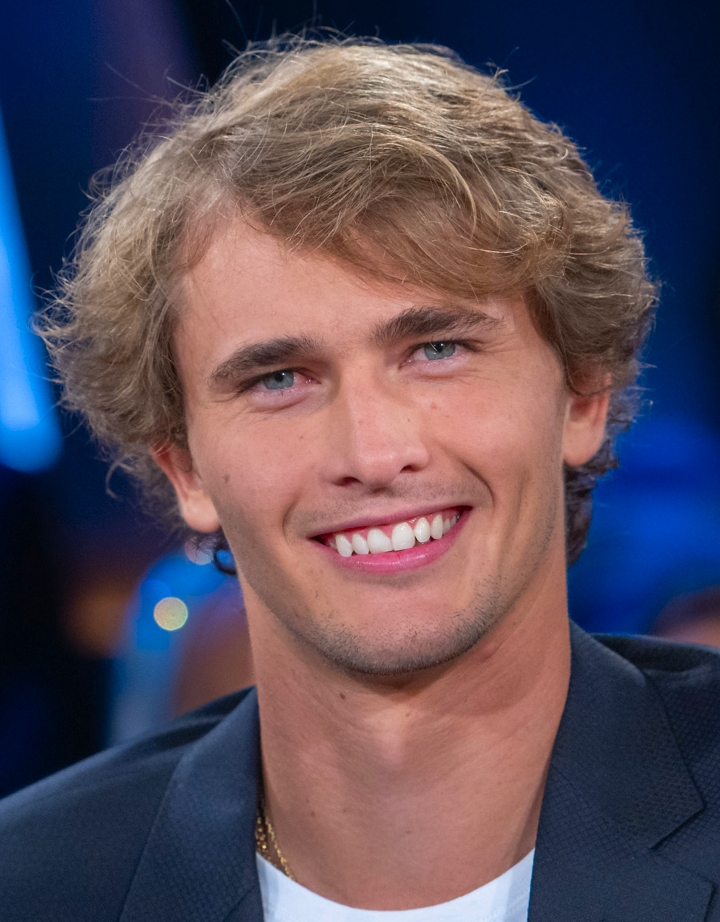
Zverev

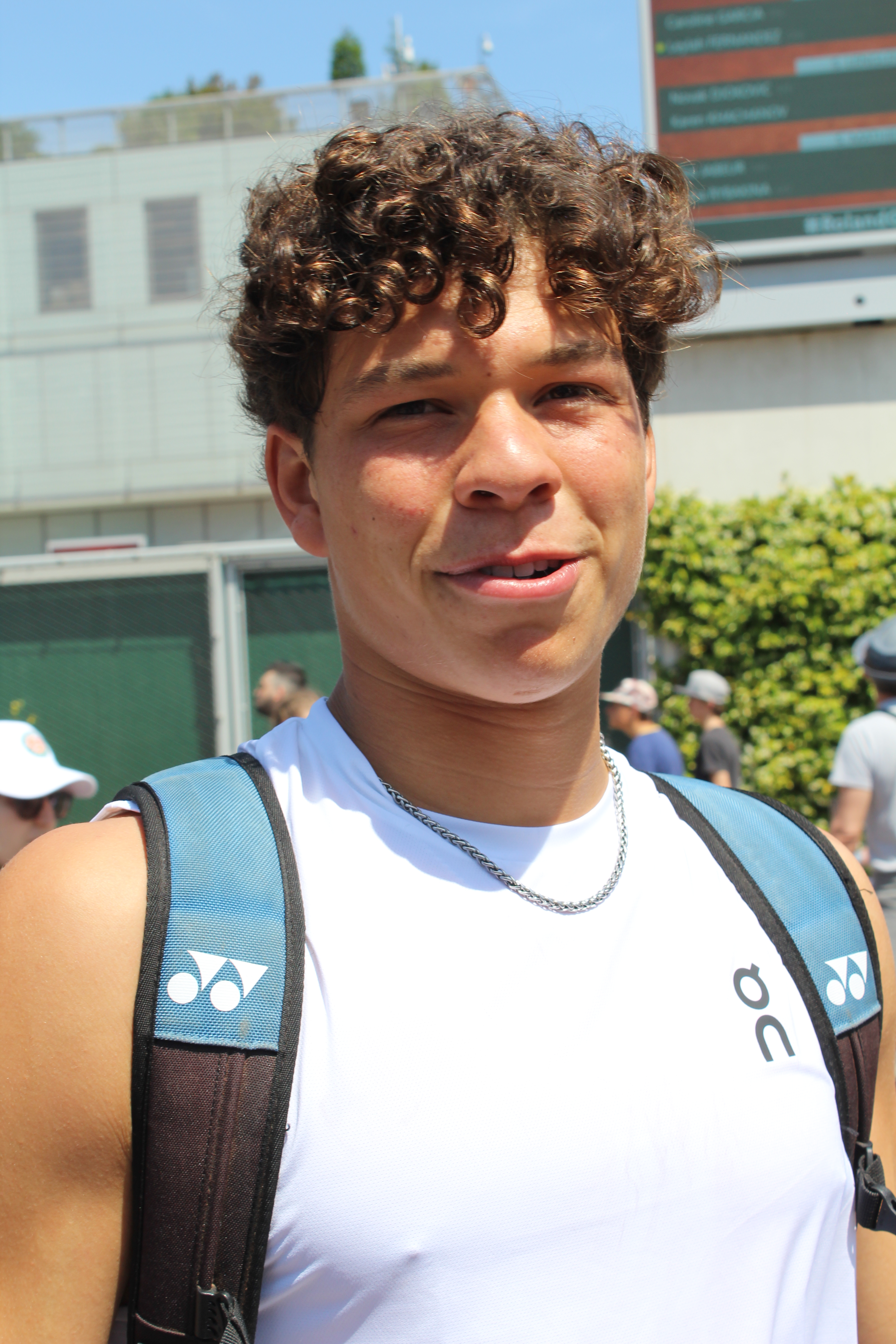
Shelton

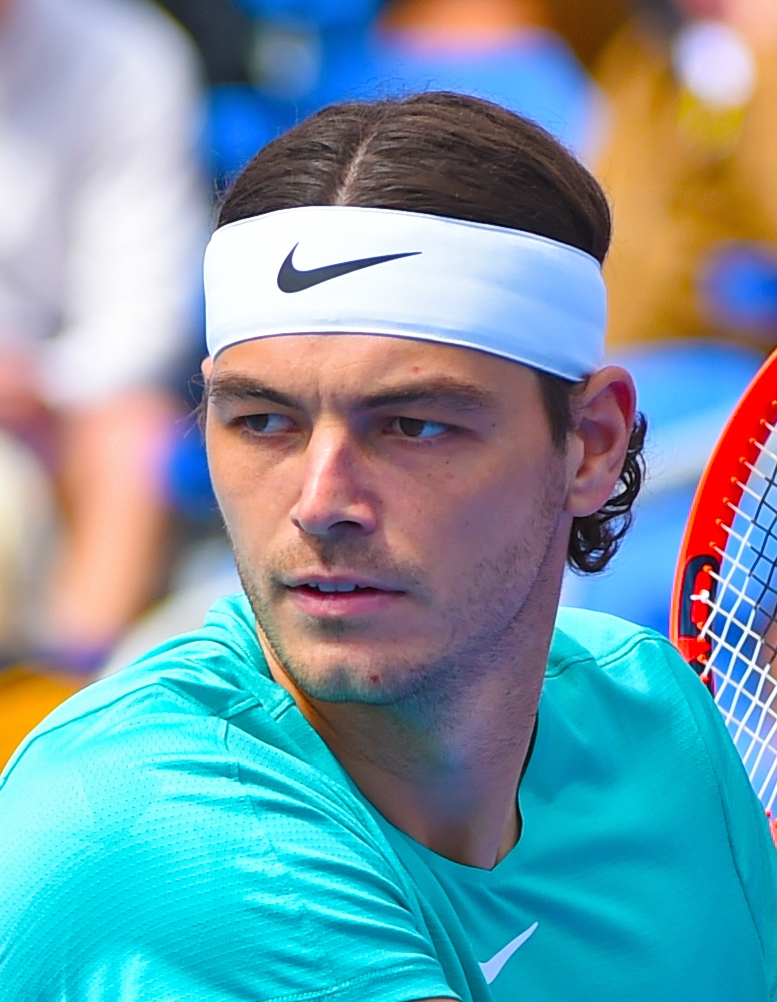
Fritz

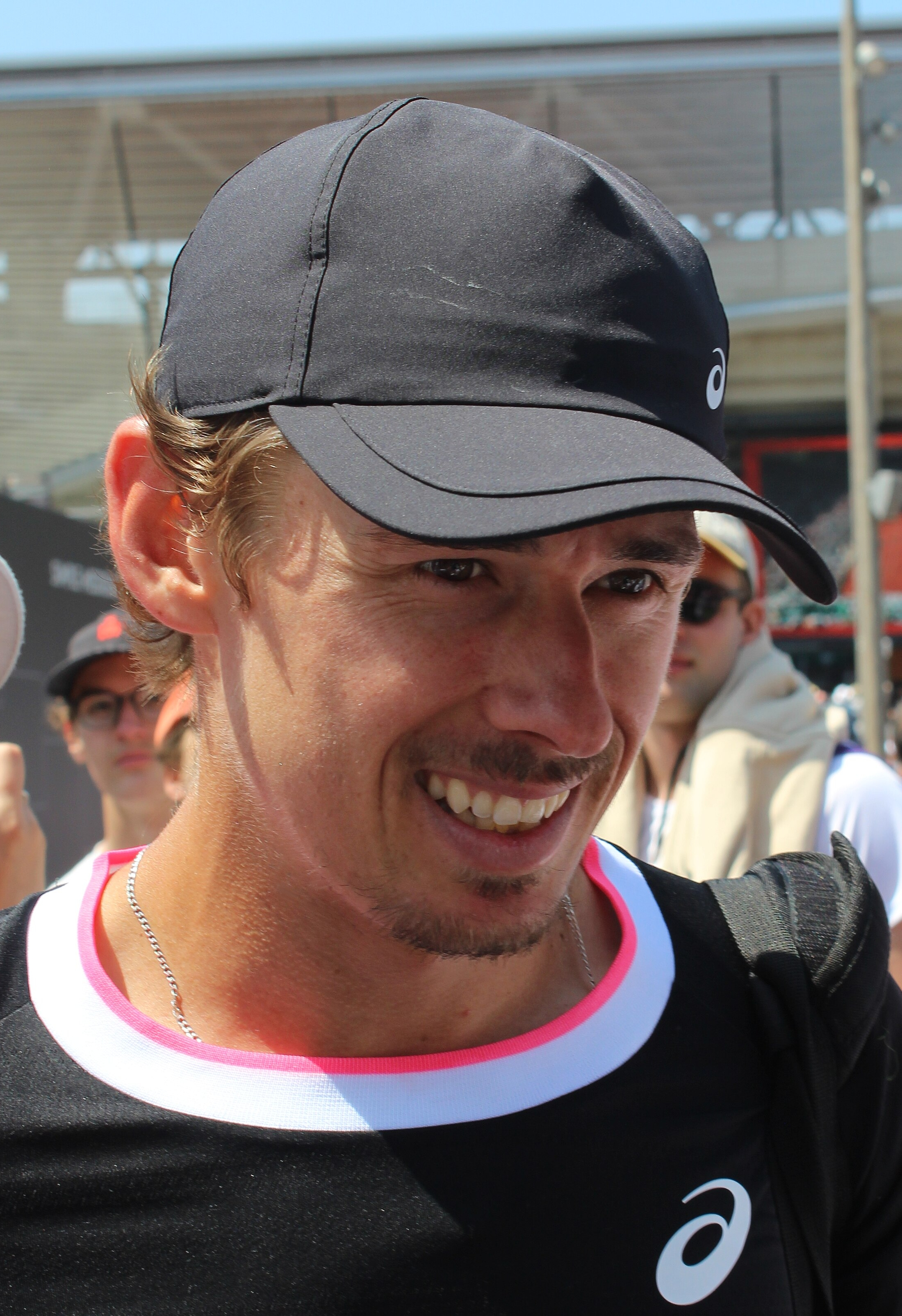
de Minaur

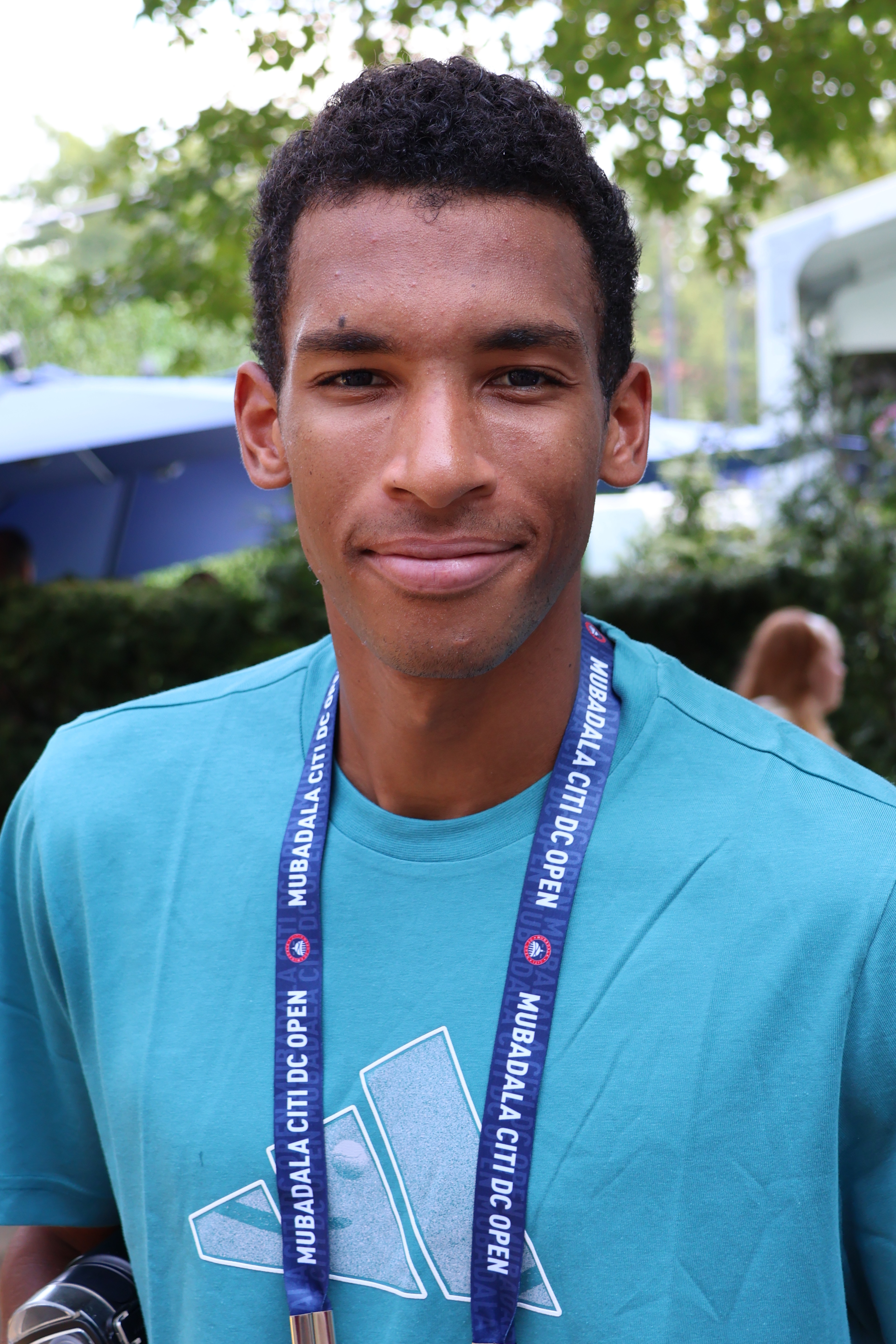
Auger-Aliassime

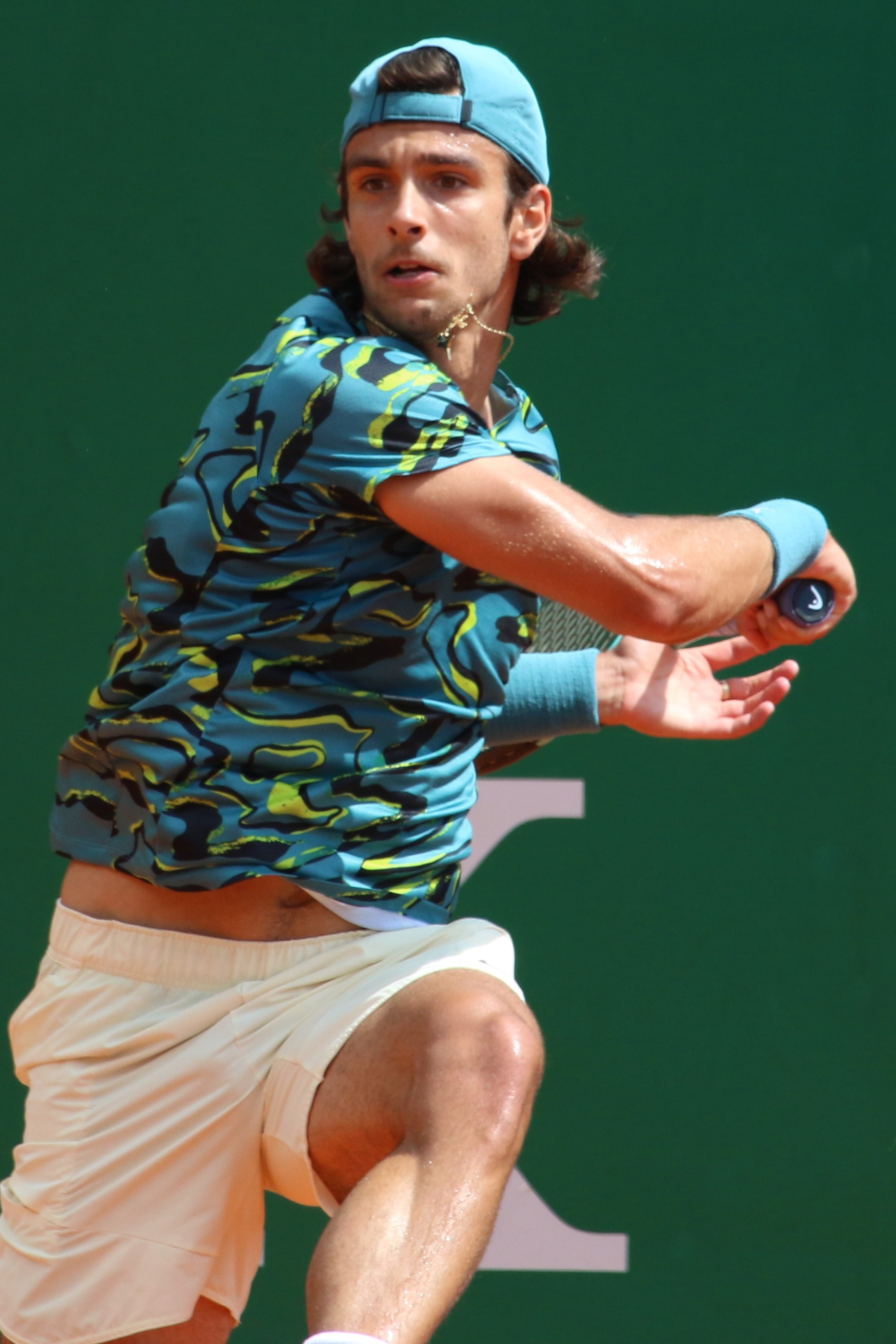
Musetti

#	Player	Age*	Date qualified
1	(Spain) Carlos Alcaraz	22 years, 188 days	9 July
2	(Italy) Jannik Sinner	24 years, 85 days	8 August
3	(Germany) Alexander Zverev	28 years, 203 days	24 October
–^{x}	~~(Serbia) Novak Djokovic~~	38 years, 171 days	18 October
4	(United States) Ben Shelton	23 years, 31 days	30 October
5	(United States) Taylor Fritz	28 years, 12 days	29 October
6	(Australia) Alex de Minaur	26 years, 265 days	30 October
7	(Canada) Félix Auger-Aliassime	25 years, 93 days	8 November
8	(Italy) Lorenzo Musetti	23 years, 251 days	8 November

^{x} Player withdrew due to injury

* - at start of tournament.

=== Doubles ===
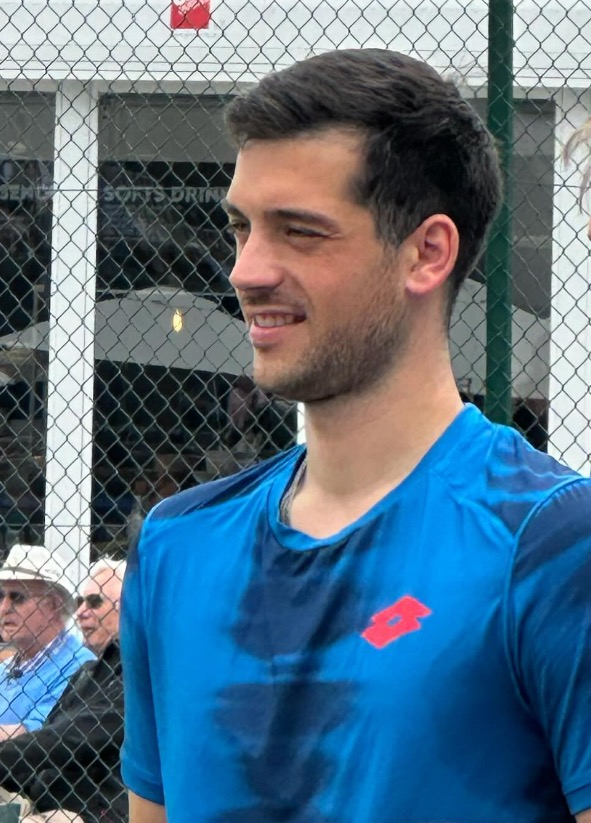
Cash

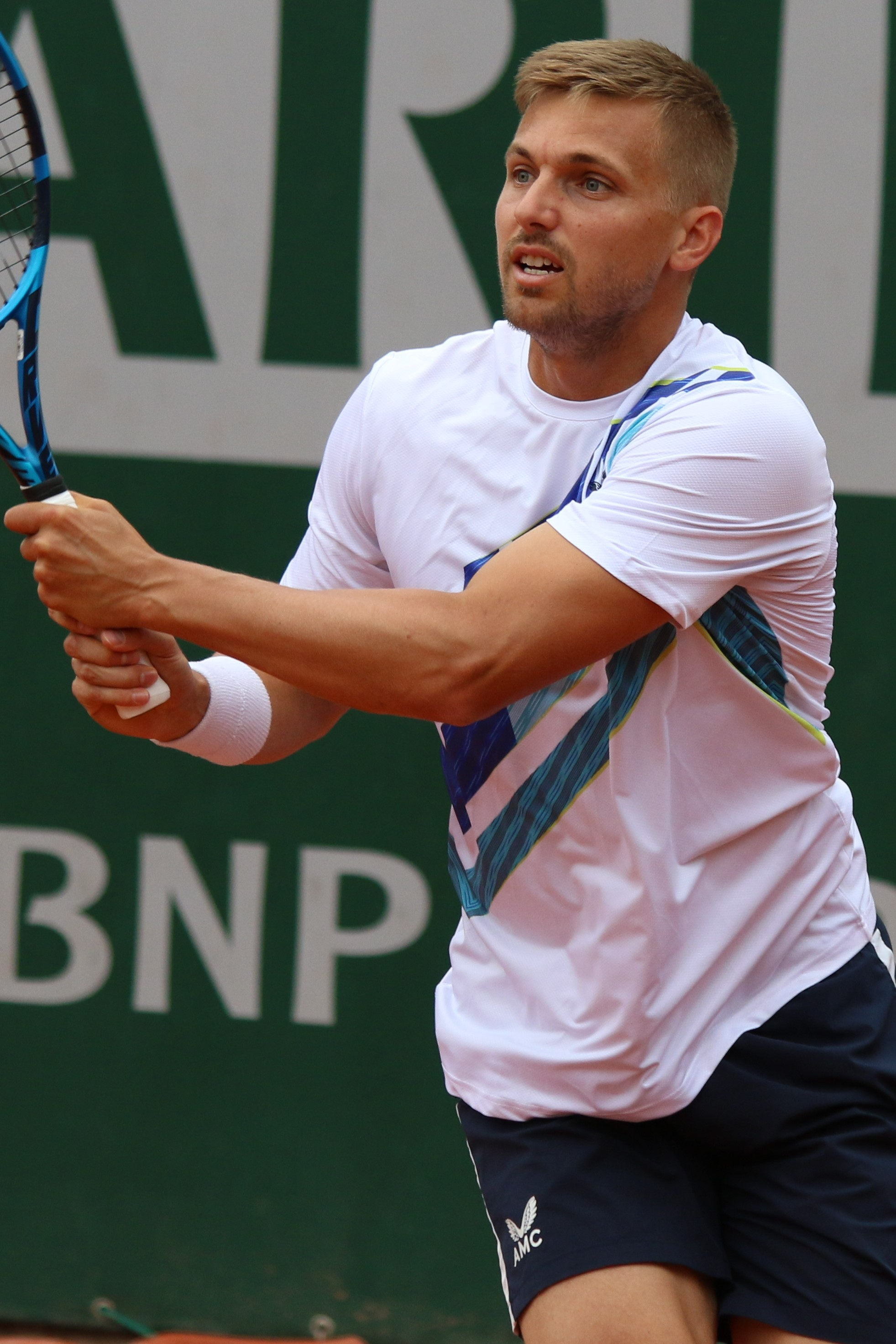
Glasspool

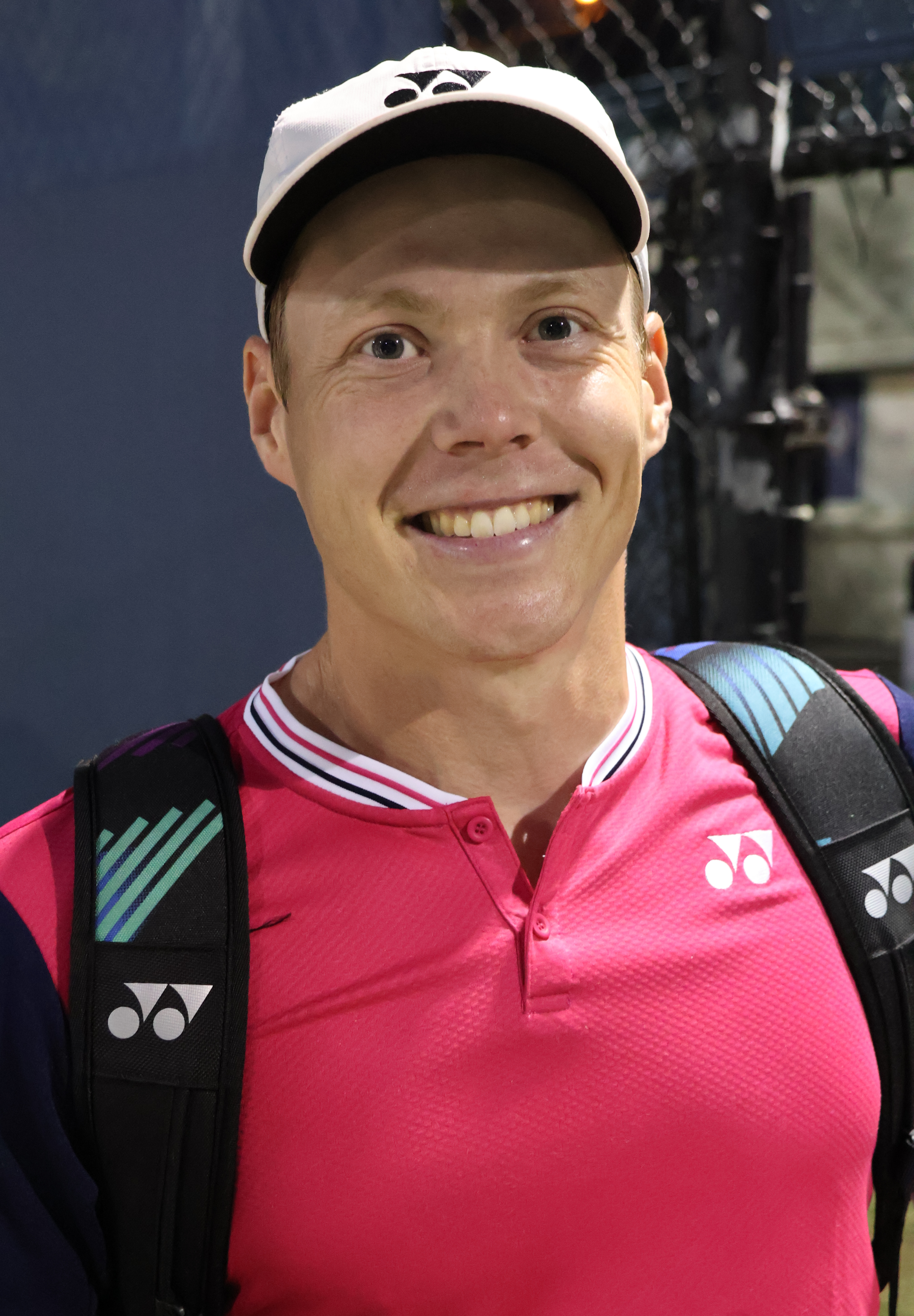
Heliövaara

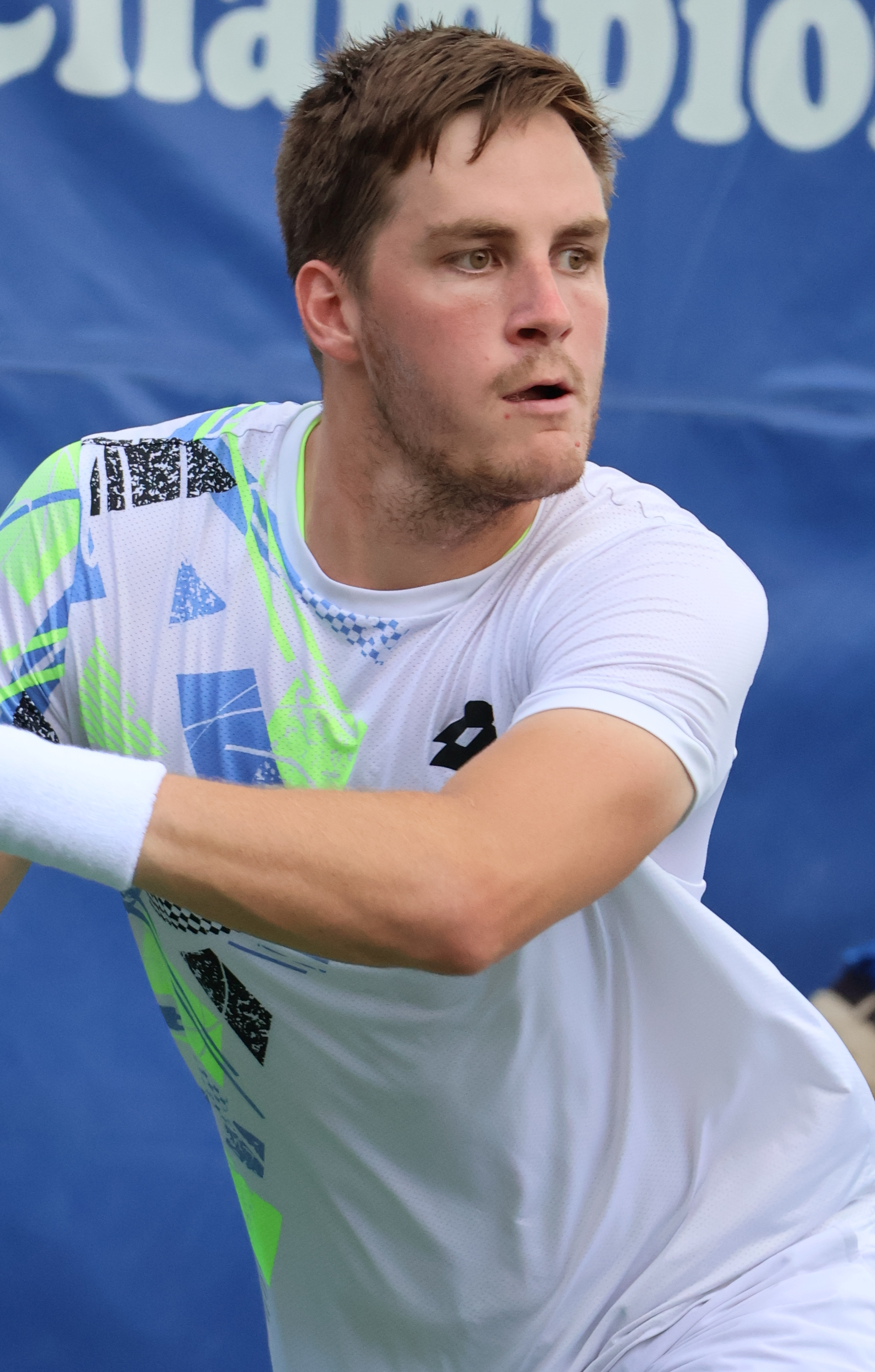
Patten

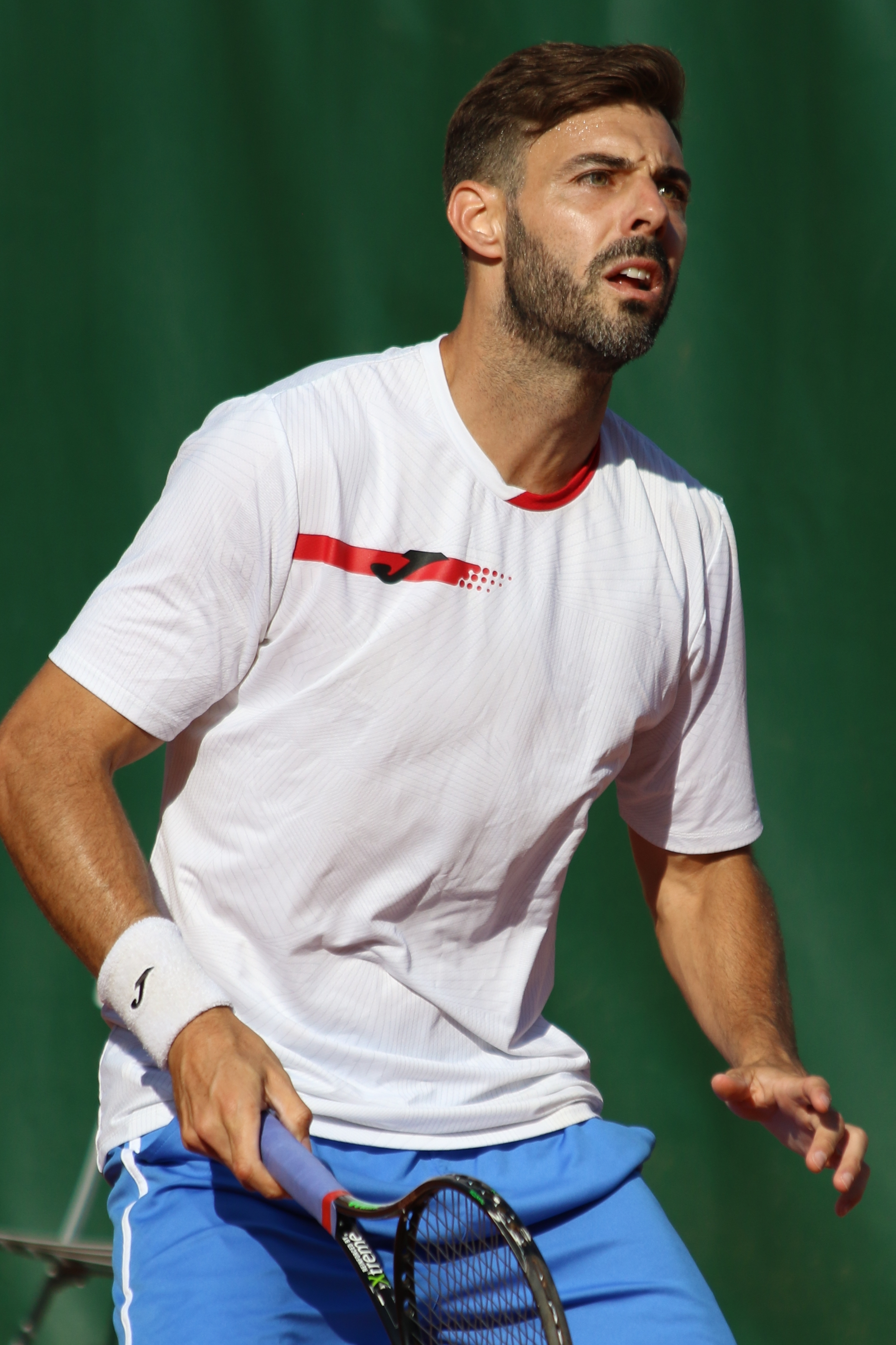
Granollers

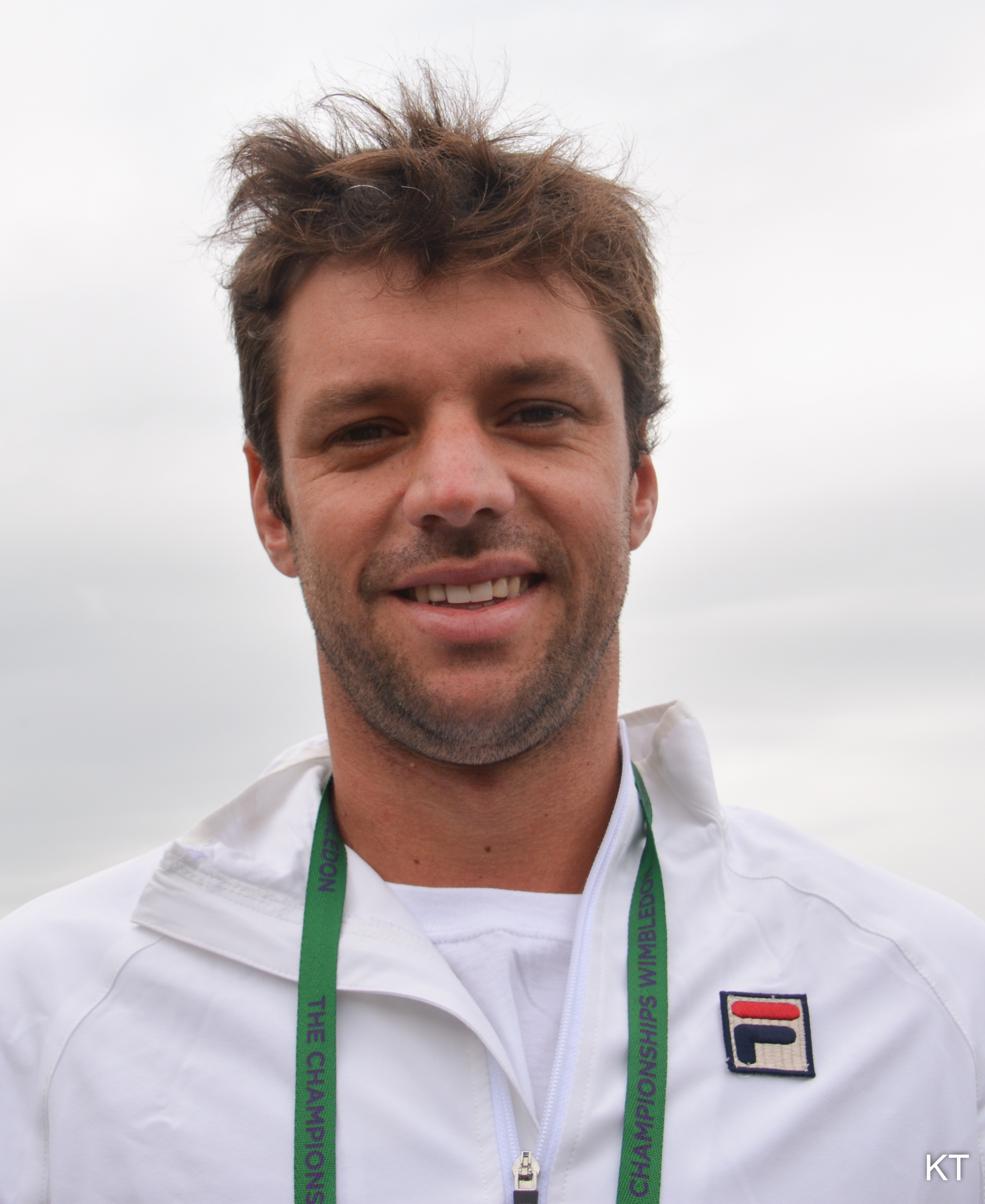
Zeballos

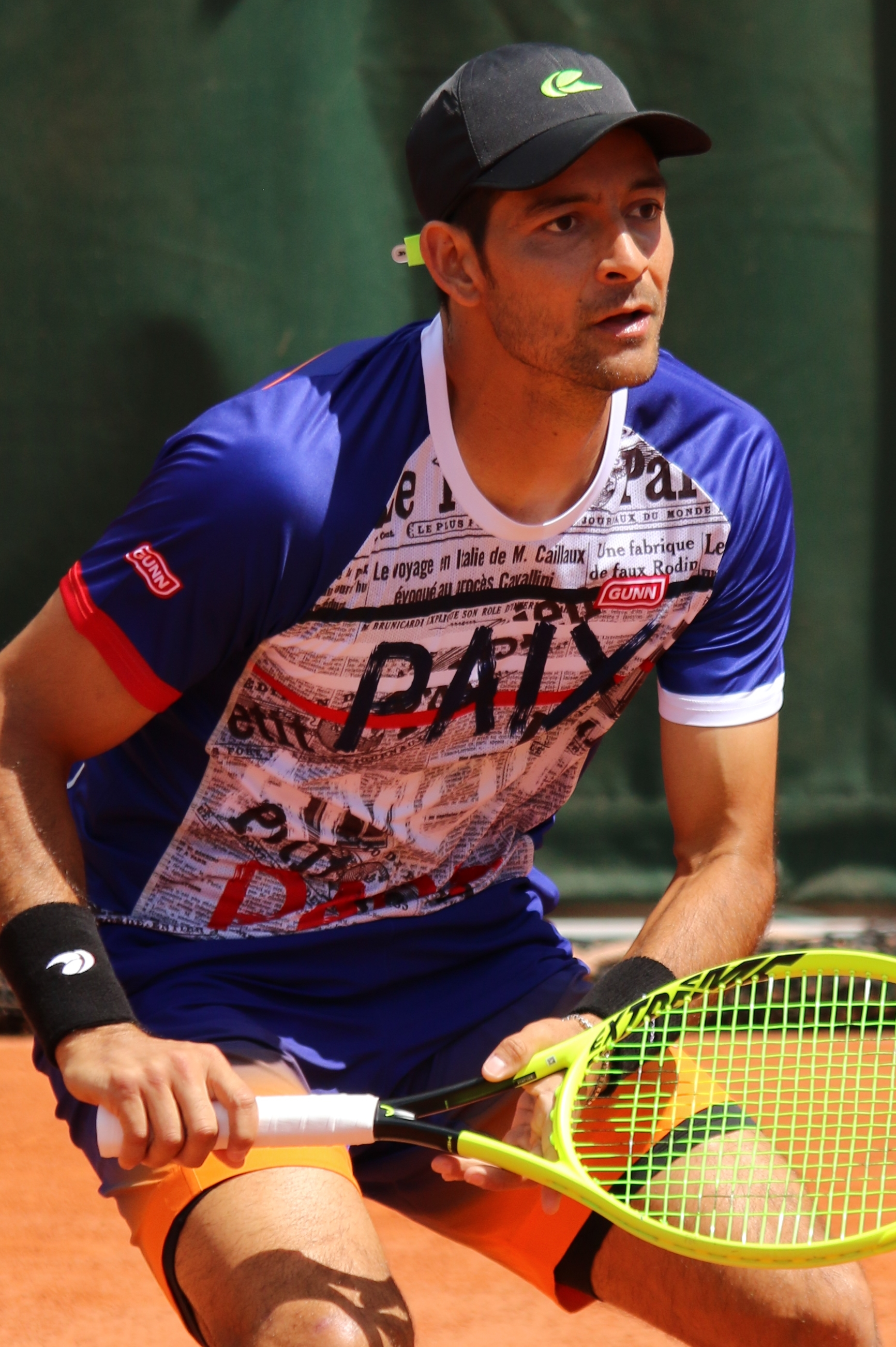
Arévalo

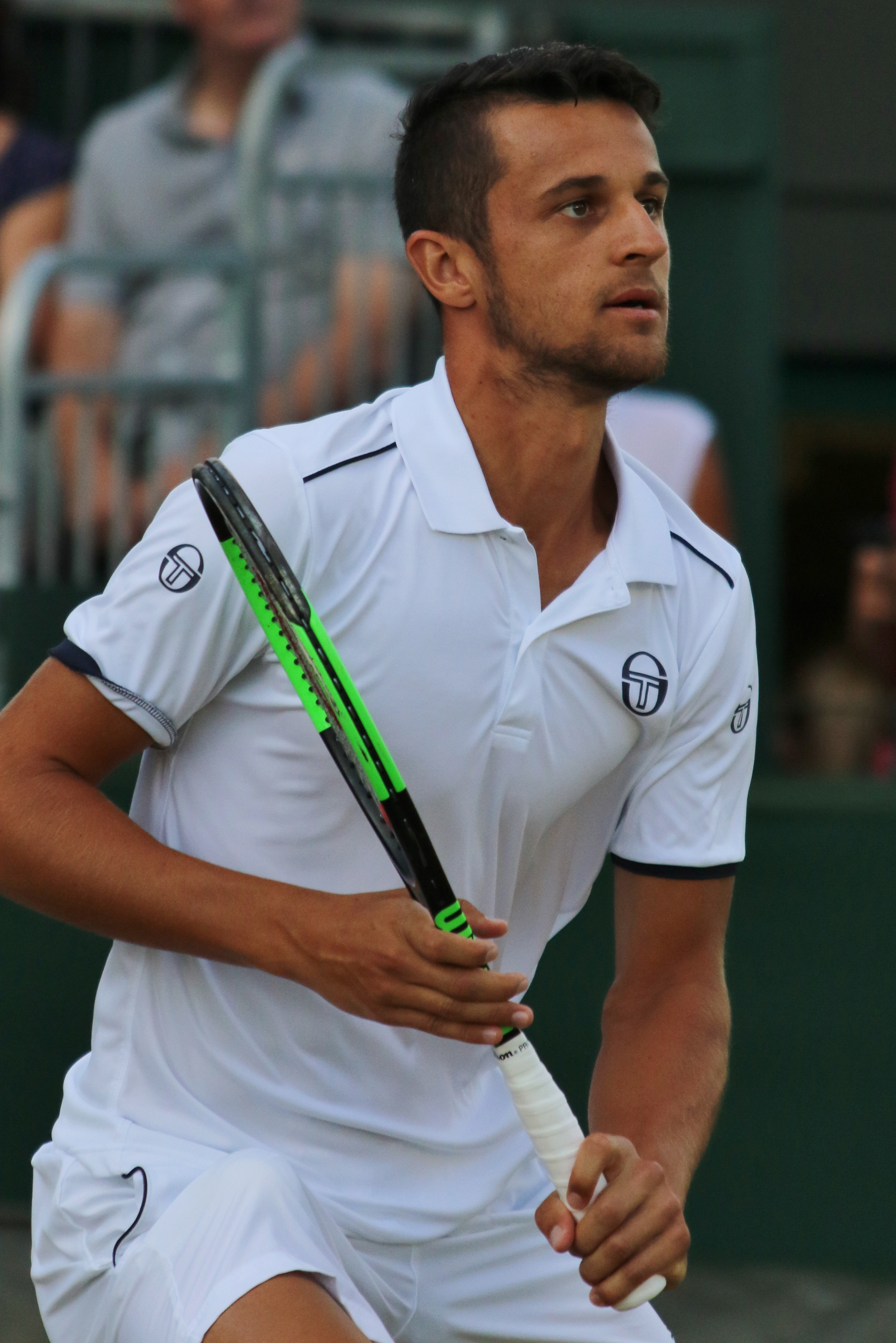
Pavić

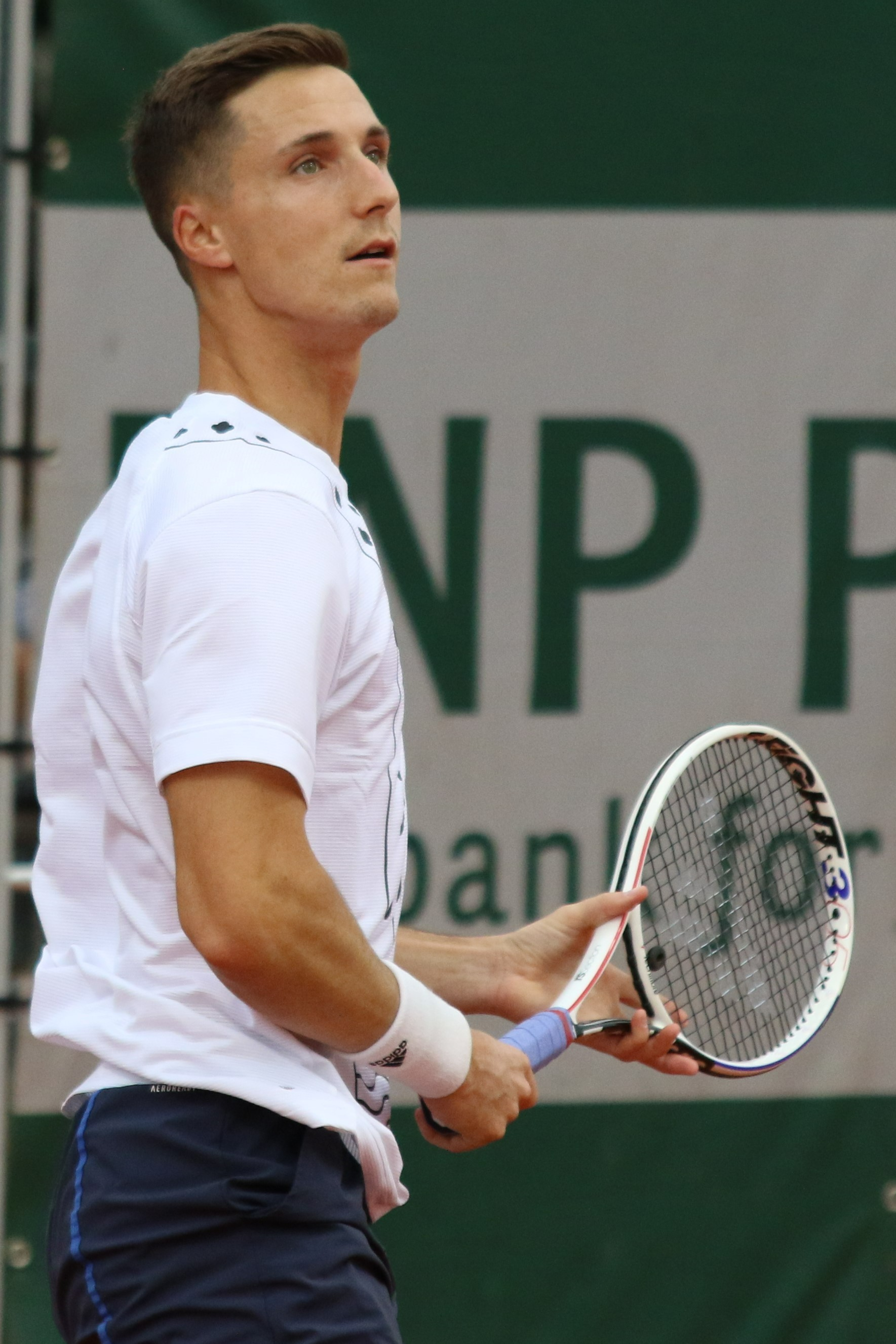
Salisbury

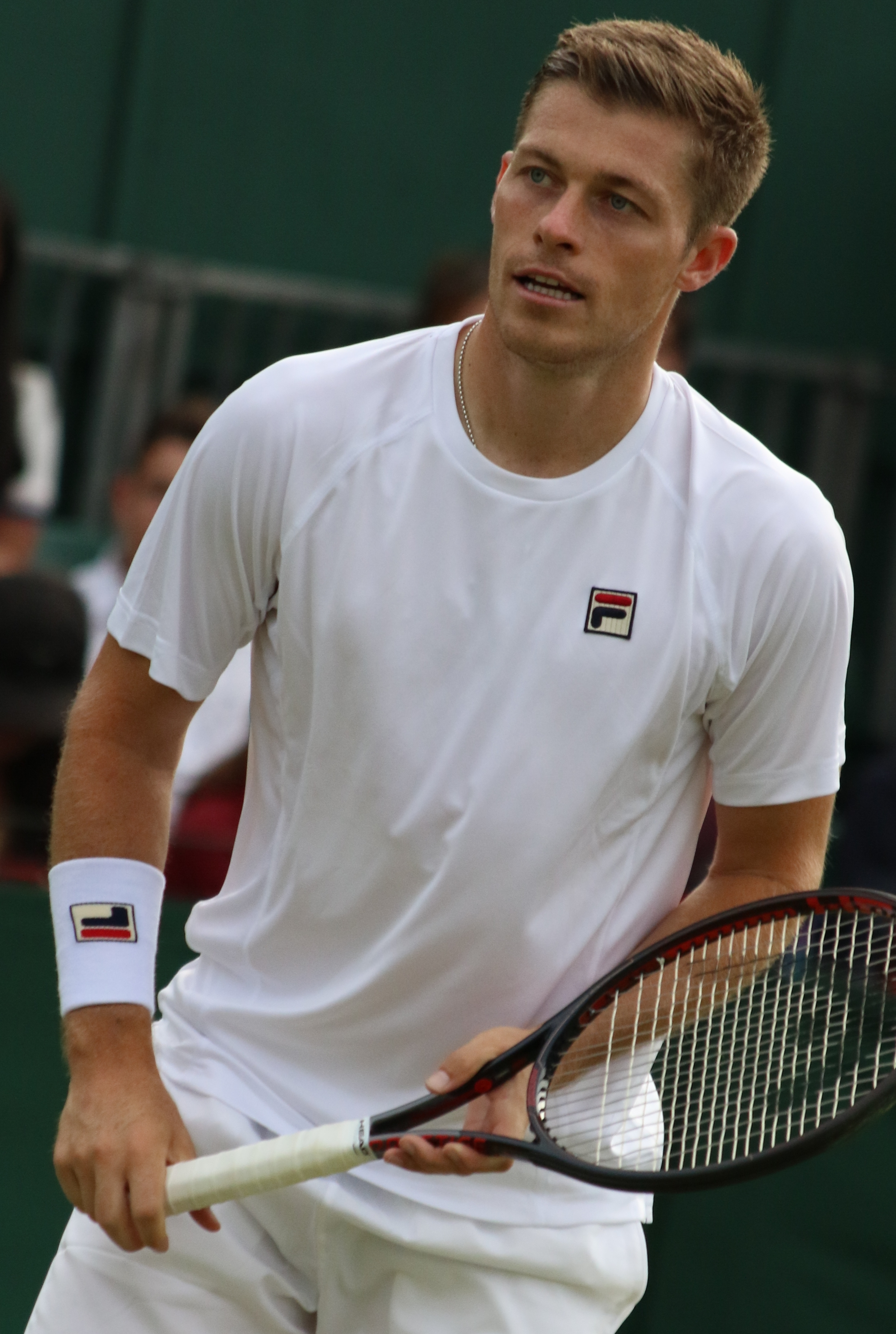
Skupski

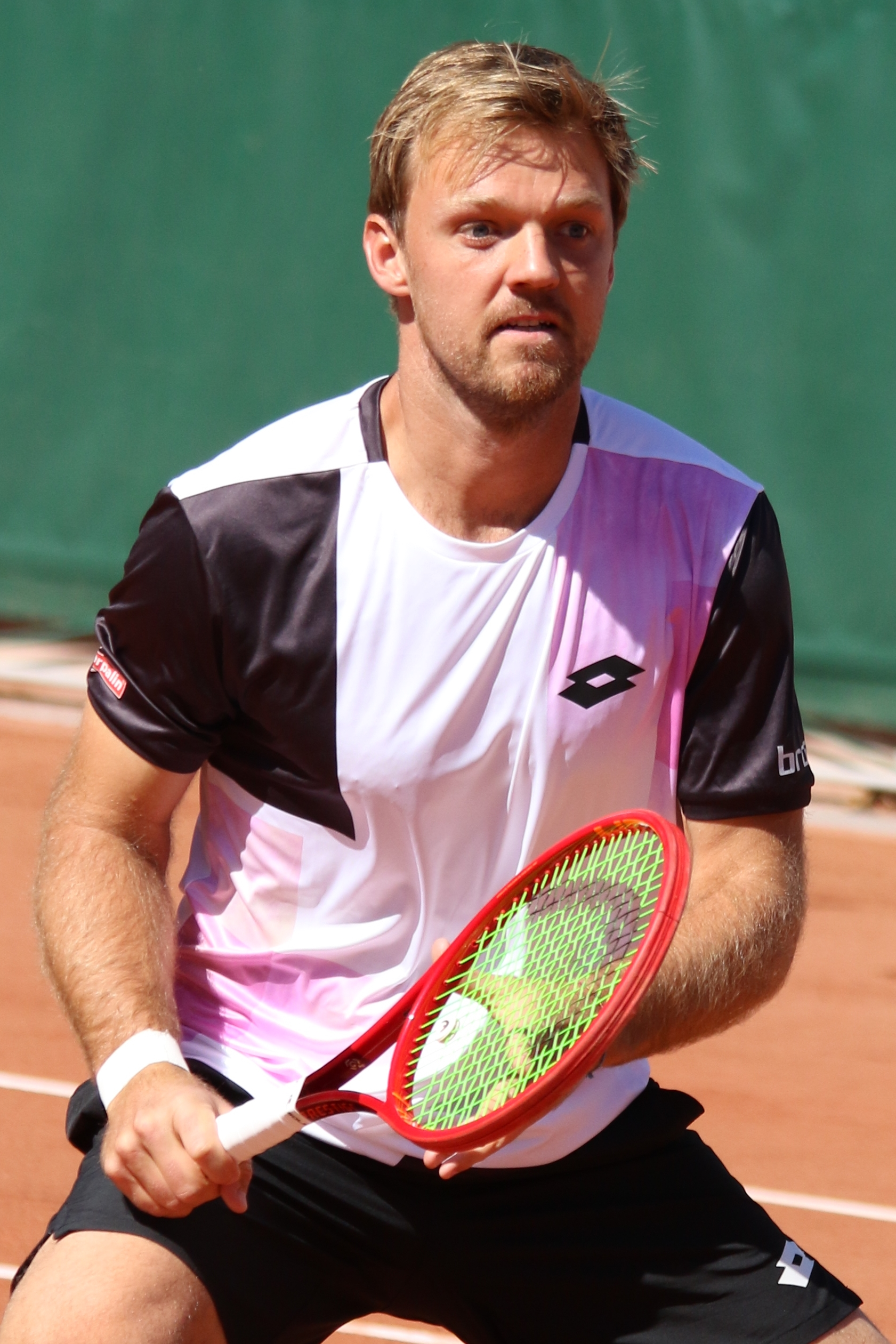
Krawietz

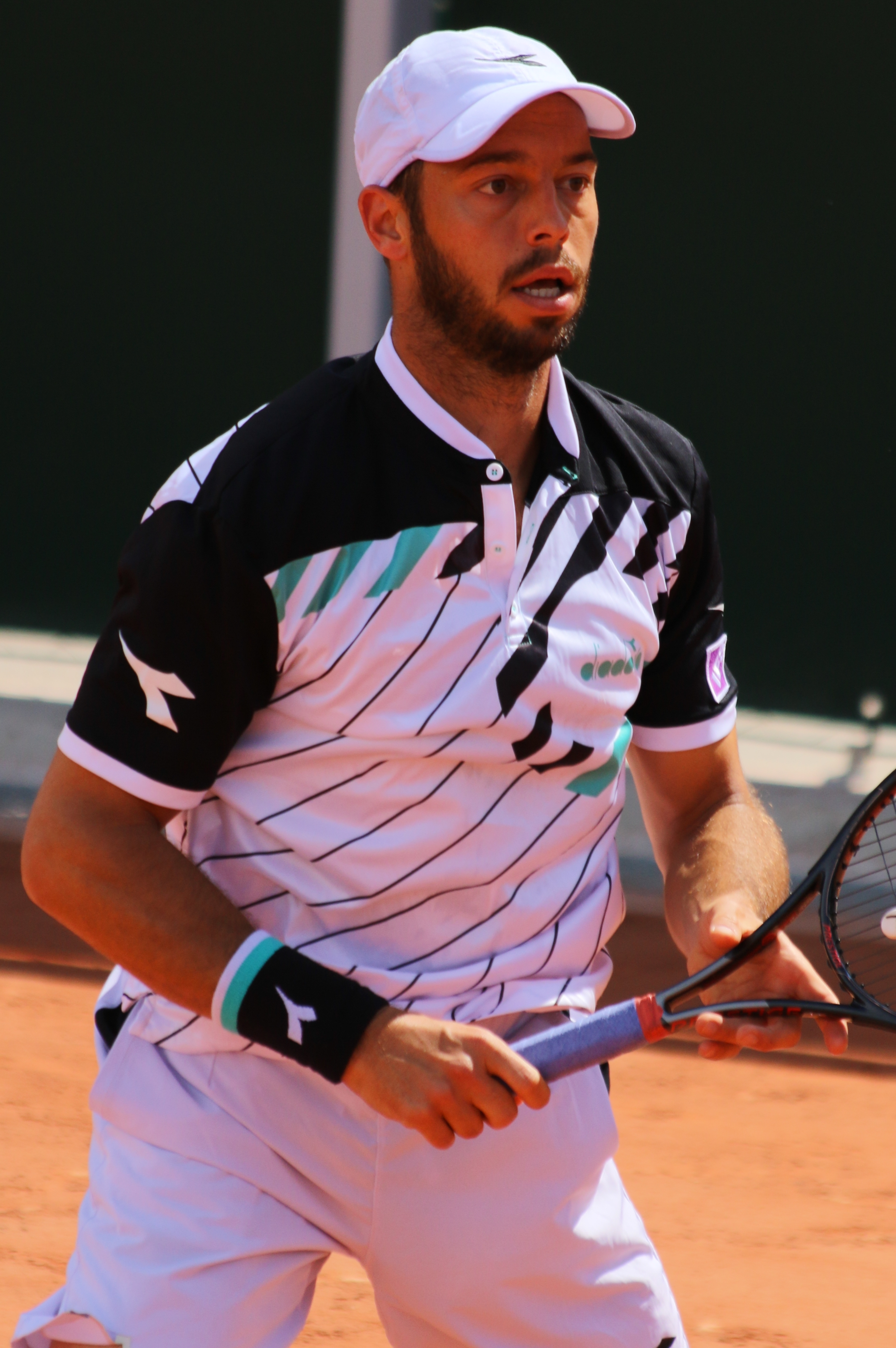
Pütz

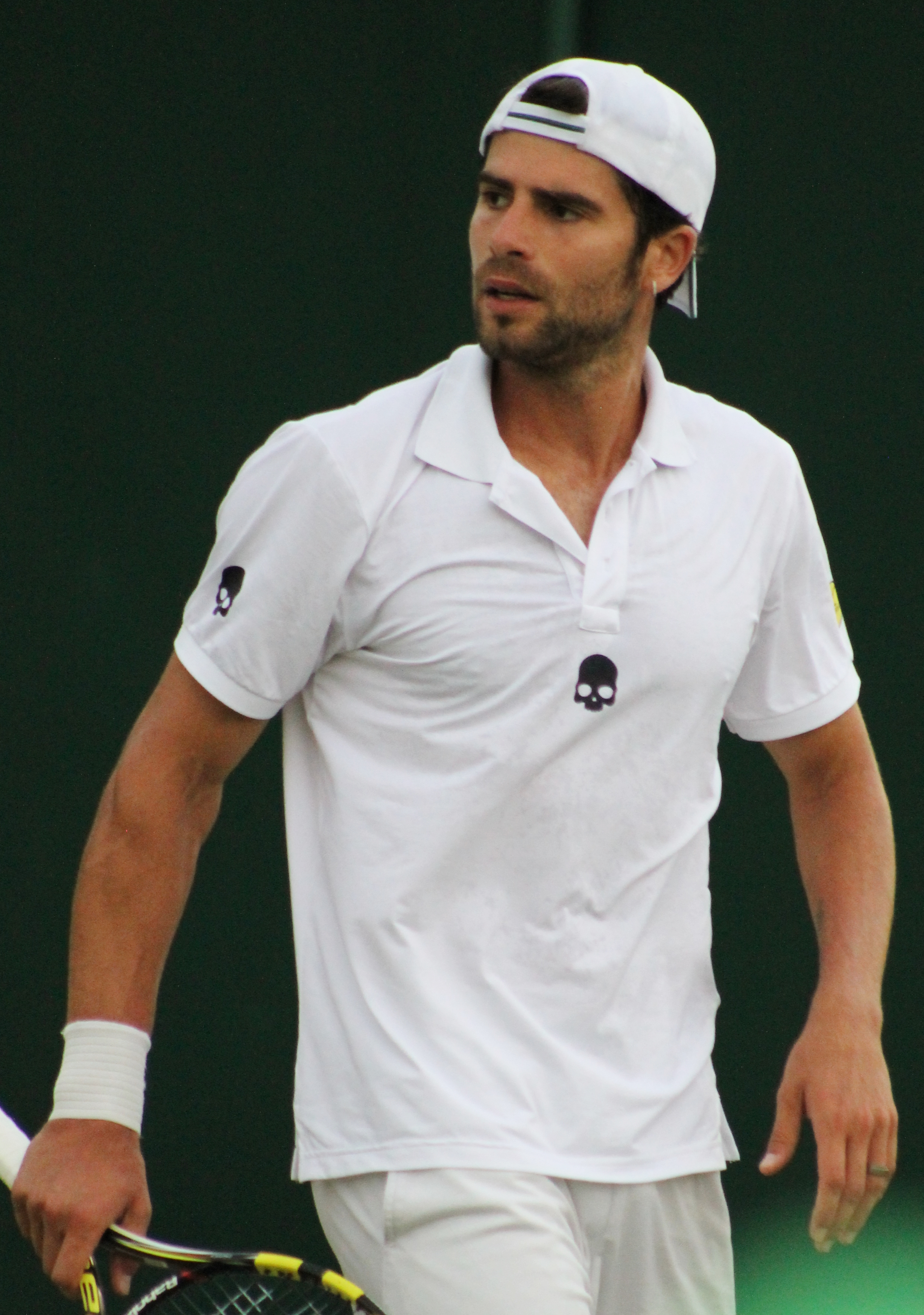
Bolelli

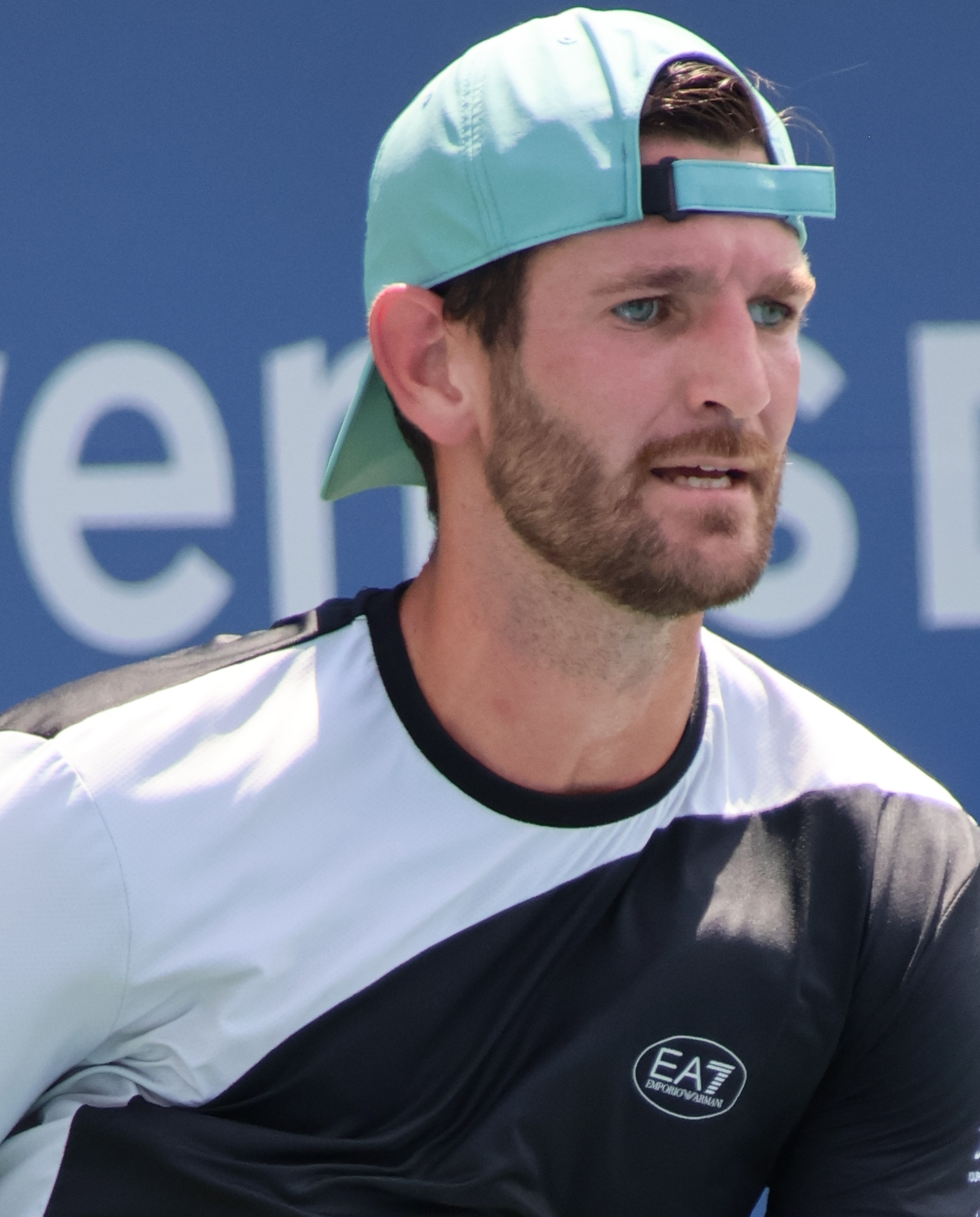
Vavassori

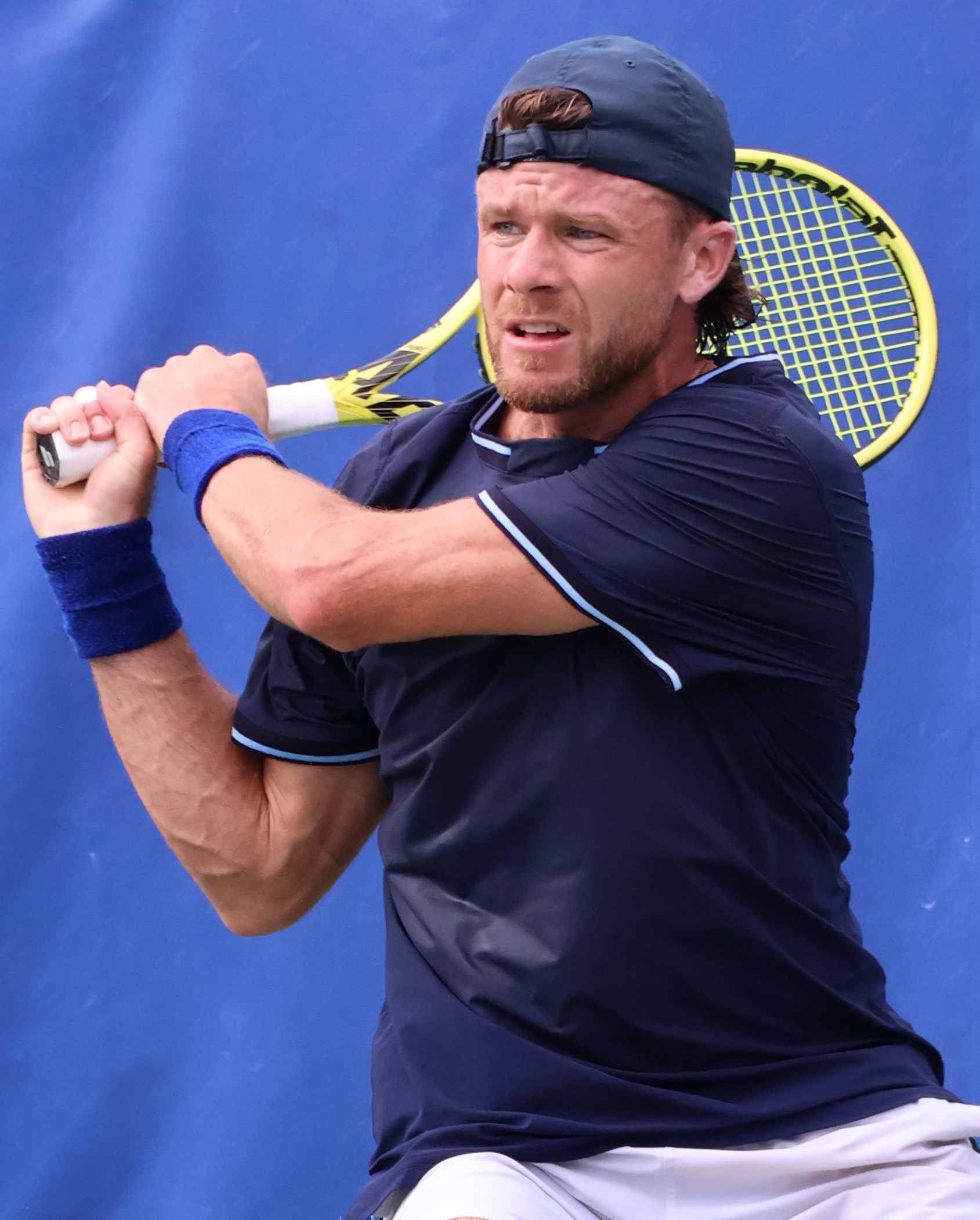
Harrison

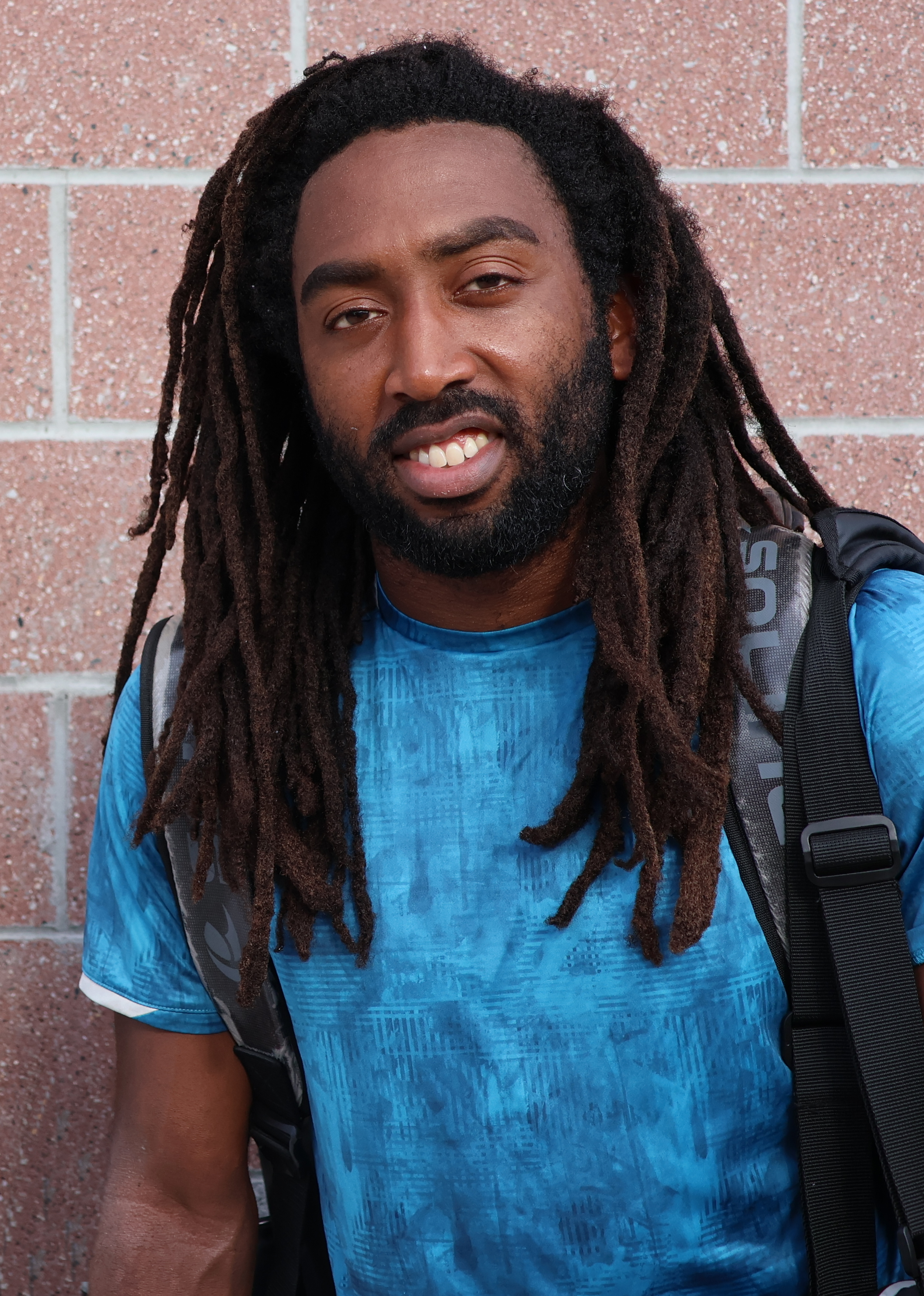
King

#	Players	Age*	Date qualified
1	(United Kingdom) Julian Cash (United Kingdom) Lloyd Glasspool	29 years, 72 days 31 years, 355 days	8 August
2	(Finland) Harri Heliövaara (United Kingdom) Henry Patten	36 years, 158 days 29 years, 187 days	1 October
3	(Spain) Marcel Granollers (Argentina) Horacio Zeballos	39 years, 211 days 40 years, 196 days	6 September
4	(El Salvador) Marcelo Arévalo (Croatia) Mate Pavić	35 years, 23 days 32 years, 128 days	18 September
5	(United Kingdom) Joe Salisbury (United Kingdom) Neal Skupski	33 years, 203 days 35 years, 343 days	2 October
6	(Germany) Kevin Krawietz (Germany) Tim Pütz	33 years, 289 days 37 years, 355 days	27 October
7	(Italy) Simone Bolelli (Italy) Andrea Vavassori	35 years, 23 days 32 years, 128 days	28 October
8	(United States) Christian Harrison (United States) Evan King	31 years, 164 days 33 years, 229 days	30 October

== Points breakdown ==
=== Singles ===
† Player qualified for ATP Finals.
- Player withdrew due to injury.

Rank	Player	Grand Slam				ATP Masters 1000 (mandatory) (Note: Player can replace points from up to three mandatory Masters 1000 with other next-best results. Ranking points are shown in italics in these cases.)								Best other (Note: Commitment players are required to play at least four 500 events. Those who fail to do so have to drop as many results as the number of 500 events missed. These cases are marked with P.)							Total points	Tourn	Titles
Rank	Player	AO	RG	WIM	USO	IW	MI	MA	IT	CA	CI	SH	PA	1	2	3	4	5	6	7	Total points	Tourn	Titles
1^{†}	(Spain) Carlos Alcaraz	QF; 400	W 2000	F 1300	W 2000	SF; 400	R64; 10	A 0	W 1000	A 0	W 1000	A 0	R32; 10	W 1000	W 500	W 500	W 500	F 330	QF; 100		11,050	15	8
2^{†}	(Italy) Jannik Sinner	W 2000	F 1300	W 2000	F 1300	A 0 (Note: Sinner was suspended from 9 February to 4 May after settling with the World Anti-Doping Agency following two positive drug tests in 2024.)	A 0	A 0	F 650	A 0	F 650	R32; 50	W 1000	W 500	W 500	R16; 50					10,000	11	5
3^{†}	(Germany) Alexander Zverev	F 1300	QF; 400	R128; 10	R32; 100	R16; 50	R16; 100	R16; 100	QF; 200	SF; 400	SF; 400	R32; 50	SF; 400	W 500	F 330	SF; 200	F 165	QF; 100	QF; 100	QF; 55	4,960	23	1
–	(Serbia) Novak Djokovic	SF; 800	SF; 800	SF; 800	SF; 800	R64; 10	F 650	R64; 10	A 0	A 0	A 0	SF; 400	A 0	W 250	W 250	QF; 50	R32; 10	R32; 0			4,830	13	2
4^{†}	(United States) Ben Shelton	SF; 800	R16; 200	QF; 400	R32; 100	QF; 200	R64; 10	R32; 50	R64; 10	W 1000	QF; 200	R64; 10	QF; 200	F 330	SF; 200	SF; 100	R16; 50	R16; 50	R16; 50	R64; 10	3,970	22	1
5^{†}	(United States) Taylor Fritz	R32; 100	R128; 10	SF; 800	QF; 400	R16; 100	SF; 400	R16; 100	QF; 50	SF; 400	R16; 100	R32; 50	R16; 100	F 330	W 295	W 250	W 250	QF; 100	R16; 50	R16; 50	3,935	22	3
6^{†}	(Australia) Alex de Minaur	QF; 400	R64; 50	R16; 200	QF; 400	R16; 100	R16; 100	R16; 100	R16; 100	QF; 200	RR; 55	QF; 200	QF; 200	W 500	SF; 400	F 330	SF; 200	SF; 200	QF; 100	QF; 100	3,935	22	1
7^{†}	(Canada) Félix Auger-Aliassime	R64; 50	R128; 10	R64; 50	SF; 800	SF; 100	R32; 50	SF; 100	A 0	RR; 55	QF; 200	QF; 200	F 650	F 330	W 250	W 250	W 250	SF; 200	SF; 200	QF; 100	3,845	26	3
8^{†}	(Italy) Lorenzo Musetti	R32; 100	SF; 800	R128; 10	QF; 400	R32; 50	R16; 100	SF; 400	SF; 400	R32; 50	QF; 50	R16; 100	QF; 50	F 650	SF; 200	F 165	F 165	QF; 100	QF; 50	P 0	3,840	21	0
Alternates
–	(United Kingdom) Jack Draper	R16; 200	R16; 200	R64; 50	R64; 50	W 1000	R64; 10	F 650	QF; 200	A 0	A 0	A 0	A 0	F 330	SF; 200	R16; 100					2,990	11	1
9	(Kazakhstan) Alexander Bublik	R128; 10	QF; 400	R128; 10	R16; 200	QF; 50	R64; 30	R16; 100	R64; 30	A 0	A 0	R16; 25	SF; 400	W 500	W 250	W 250	W 250	W 175	QF; 100	F 90	2,870	27	5
10	(Norway) Casper Ruud	R64; 50	R64; 50	A 0	R64; 50	R64; 10	R16; 100	W 1000	QF; 200	R16; 100	R16; 50	QF; 50	R32; 10	F 330	W 250	SF; 200	R16; 100	QF; 100	QF; 100	RR; 85	2,835	20	2

=== Doubles ===
† Team qualified for ATP Finals.

Rank	Team	Points																			Total points	Tourn	Titles
Rank	Team	1	2	3	4	5	6	7	8	9	10	11	12	13	14	15	16	17	18	19	Total points	Tourn	Titles
1^{†}	(United Kingdom) Julian Cash (United Kingdom) Lloyd Glasspool	W 2000	W 1000	F 600	F 600	F 600	W 500	W 500	W 500	QF; 360	SF; 360	W 250	W 250	R16; 180	SF; 180	F 150	R16; 90	QF; 90	QF; 90	QF; 45	8,345	23	7
2^{†}	(Finland) Harri Heliövaara (United Kingdom) Henry Patten	W 2000	W 1000	W 500	QF; 360	QF; 360	SF; 360	SF; 360	SF; 360	F 300	QF; 180	QF; 180	SF; 180	SF; 180	SF; 180	SF; 180	R16; 90	R16; 90	SF; 90	SF; 90	7,040	22	3
3^{†}	(Spain) Marcel Granollers (Argentina) Horacio Zeballos	W 2000	W 2000	W 1000	SF; 720	W 500	W 250	QF; 180	W 175	R32; 0	R32; 0	R32; 0	R16; 0	R16; 0							6,825	13	5
4^{†}	(El Salvador) Marcelo Arévalo (Croatia) Mate Pavić	W 1000	W 1000	W 1000	SF; 720	F 600	QF; 360	SF; 360	SF; 360	R16; 180	QF; 180	QF; 180	SF; 180	R32; 90	QF; 90	QF; 90	QF; 90	QF; 90	SF; 90	QF; 45	6,705	20	3
5^{†}	(United Kingdom) Joe Salisbury (United Kingdom) Neal Skupski	F 1200	F 1200	F 600	QF; 360	SF; 360	SF; 360	F 300	F 300	SF; 180	R32; 90	R16; 90	R16; 90	R16; 90	R16; 90	QF; 90	QF; 90	SF; 90	SF; 90	R32; 0	5,670	22	0
6^{†}	(Germany) Kevin Krawietz (Germany) Tim Pütz	W 1000	SF; 720	W 500	SF; 360	SF; 360	F 300	R16; 180	R16; 180	QF; 180	QF; 180	QF; 180	F 150	R32; 90	R16; 90	QF; 90	QF; 90	QF; 90	QF; 45	R16; 0	4,785	19	2
7^{†}	(Italy) Simone Bolelli (Italy) Andrea Vavassori	F 1200	W 500	W 500	W 500	F 300	W 250	R16; 180	QF; 180	R32; 90	R32; 90	R16; 90	R16; 90	QF; 90	SF; 90	R32; 0	R16; 0	R32; 0	R32; 0	R32; 0	4,150	24	4
8^{†}	(United States) Christian Harrison (United States) Evan King	SF; 720	W 545	W 545	SF; 360	SF; 360	W 250	QF; 180	QF; 180	QF; 180	SF; 180	F 150	R16; 90	QF; 90	R64; 0	R64; 0	R32; 0	R32; 0	R16; 0	R16; 0	3,830	27	3
Alternates
9	(Monaco) Hugo Nys (France) Édouard Roger-Vasselin	SF; 720	W 500	QF; 360	QF; 360	F 300	R16; 180	F 150	F 150	R16; 90	R16; 90	R16; 90	R16; 90	R16; 90	R16; 90	QF; 90	QF; 90	SF; 90	QF; 45	QF; 45	3,620	21	1
10	(France) Sadio Doumbia (France) Fabien Reboul	F 600	QF; 360	F 300	W 250	R16; 180	W 125	R32; 90	R32; 90	R16; 90	QF; 90	QF; 90	QF; 90	QF; 90	SF; 90	SF; 90	SF; 90	SF; 90	SF; 60	SF; 60	2,925	35	1

== Head-to-head records ==
Below are the head-to-head records as they approached the tournament.

=== Singles ===
		Alcaraz	Sinner	Zverev	Shelton	Fritz	de Minaur	Auger-Aliassime	Musetti	Overall	YTD W–L
1	(Spain) Carlos Alcaraz		10–5	6–6	3–0	4–1	4–0	4–3	6–1	37–16	67–8
2	(Italy) Jannik Sinner	5–10		5–4	7–1	4–1	12–0	3–2	3–0	39–18	53–6
3	(Germany) Alexander Zverev	6–6	4–5		4–0	5–9	8–3	6–3	2–3	35–29	54–23
4	(United States) Ben Shelton	0–3	1–7	0–4		1–1	1–0	0–1	1–2	4–18	40–21
5	(United States) Taylor Fritz	1–4	1–4	9–5	1–1		5–5	3–1	2–3	22–23	52–21
6	(Australia) Alex de Minaur	0–4	0–12	3–8	0–1	5–5		1–3	1–3	10–36	55–21
7	(Canada) Félix Auger-Aliassime	3–4	2–3	3–6	1–0	1–3	3–1		4–4	17–21	48–22
8	(Italy) Lorenzo Musetti	1–6	0–3	3–2	2–1	3–2	3–1	4–4		16–19	44–20

=== Doubles ===
		Cash; Glasspool	Heliövaara; Patten	Granollers; Zeballos	Arévalo; Pavić	Salisbury; Skupski	Krawietz; Pütz	Bolelli; Vavassori	Harrison; King	Overall	YTD W–L
1	(United Kingdom) Julian Cash (United Kingdom) Lloyd Glasspool		4–1	1–0	1–1	3–0	4–1	1–2	0–0	14–5	58–15
2	(Finland) Harri Heliövaara (United Kingdom) Henry Patten	1–4		1–2	1–2	2–1	1–1	2–1	0–1	8–12	46–19
3	(Spain) Marcel Granollers (Argentina) Horacio Zeballos	0–1	2–1		4–1	3–1	3–0	2–2	0–0	14–6	31–7
4	(El Salvador) Marcelo Arévalo (Croatia) Mate Pavić	1–1	2–1	1–4		1–2	2–5	4–1	3–0	14–14	47–17
5	(United Kingdom) Joe Salisbury (United Kingdom) Neal Skupski	0–3	1–2	1–3	2–1		0–1	1–1	1–2	6–13	42–21
6	(Germany) Kevin Krawietz (Germany) Tim Pütz	1–4	1–1	0–3	5–2	1–0		3–3	1–0	12–13	41–16
7	(Italy) Simone Bolelli (Italy) Andrea Vavassori	2–1	1–2	2–2	1–4	1–1	3–3		0–1	10–14	35–20
8	(United States) Christian Harrison (United States) Evan King	0–0	1–0	0–0	0–3	2–1	0–1	1–0		4–5	34–23

== See also ==
- ATP rankings
- 2025 ATP Tour
- 2025 WTA Finals
- ATP Finals appearances
