= 2025 Dubai Tennis Championships – Women's doubles =

Women's doubles
- 2025 Dubai Tennis Championships

Final
- Champions: (Czech Republic) Kateřina Siniaková (United States) Taylor Townsend
- Runners-up: (Chinese Taipei) Hsieh Su-wei (Latvia) Jeļena Ostapenko
- Score: 7–6^{(7–5)}, 6–4

Details
- Draw: 28 (3 WC)
- Seeds: 8

Events
| Singles | men | women |
| Doubles | men | women |
- Dubai Tennis Championships

Defending champion Kateřina Siniaková and her partner Taylor Townsend defeated Hsieh Su-wei and Jeļena Ostapenko in the final, 7–6^{(7–5)}, 6–4 to win the women's doubles tennis title at the 2025 Dubai Tennis Championships.

Storm Hunter was the other reigning champion, but she did not participate this year.

== Seeds ==
The top four seeds received a bye into the second round.

1. (Czech Republic) Kateřina Siniaková / (United States) Taylor Townsend (champions)
2. (Canada) Gabriela Dabrowski / (New Zealand) Erin Routliffe (second round)
3. (Chinese Taipei) Hsieh Su-wei / (Latvia) Jeļena Ostapenko (final)
4. (Italy) Sara Errani / (Italy) Jasmine Paolini (withdrew)
5. (Belgium) Elise Mertens / (Australia) Ellen Perez (first round)
6. (Chinese Taipei) Chan Hao-ching / Veronika Kudermetova (first round)
7. (United States) Sofia Kenin / (Ukraine) Lyudmyla Kichenok (first round)
8. (Kazakhstan) Anna Danilina / Irina Khromacheva (second round)

== Draw ==
Key

- Q = Qualifier
- WC = Wild card
- LL = Lucky loser
- Alt = Alternate
- ITF = ITF entry
- PR = Protected ranking
- SR = Special ranking
- SE = Special exempt
- JE = Junior exempt
- JR = Junior Accelerator Programme entrant
- CO = College Accelerator Programme entrant
- NG = Next Gen Accelerator Program entrant
- w/o = Walkover
- r = Retired
- d = Defaulted

=== Finals ===
Semifinals
1 | (Czech Republic) Kateřina Siniaková (United States) Taylor Townsend | 7 | 7
(France) Kristina Mladenovic (China) Zhang Shuai | 5 | 5
3 | (Chinese Taipei) Hsieh Su-wei (Latvia) Jeļena Ostapenko | 6 | 4 | [10]
PR | (China) Xu Yifan (China) Yang Zhaoxuan | 4 | 6 | [2]

Final
1 | (Czech Republic) Kateřina Siniaková (United States) Taylor Townsend | 7^{7} | 6
3 | (Chinese Taipei) Hsieh Su-wei (Latvia) Jeļena Ostapenko | 6^{5} | 4

=== Top half ===
First round
(United States) P Stearns (New Zealand) L Sun | 3 | 6 | [10]
(Canada) L Fernandez (Ukraine) N Kichenok | 6 | 2 | [5]
WC | (Japan) A Ito; E Yashina | 3 | 6^{3}
(Brazil) B Haddad Maia (Germany) L Siegemund | 6 | 7^{7}
(United States) A Muhammad (Netherlands) D Schuurs | 6 | 1 | [13]
5 | (Belgium) E Mertens (Australia) E Perez | 3 | 6 | [11]
(Norway) U Eikeri (Romania) M Niculescu | 3 | 4
A Panova (Hungary) F Stollár | 6 | 6
(Hungary) T Babos (United States) N Melichar-Martinez | 6 | 3 | [7]
(United States) M Kessler (Denmark) C Tauson | 3 | 6 | [10]
(France) K Mladenovic (China) S Zhang | 6 | 6
7 | (United States) S Kenin (Ukraine) L Kichenok | 1 | 2

Second round
1 | (Czech Republic) K Siniaková (United States) T Townsend | w/o
(United States) P Stearns (New Zealand) L Sun
(Brazil) B Haddad Maia (Germany) L Siegemund | 6 | 6
(United States) A Muhammad (Netherlands) D Schuurs | 2 | 3
4 | (Italy) S Errani (Italy) J Paolini
A Panova (Hungary) F Stollár | w/o
(United States) M Kessler (Denmark) C Tauson
(France) K Mladenovic (China) S Zhang | w/o

Quarterfinals
1 | (Czech Republic) K Siniaková (United States) T Townsend | 3 | 6 | [10]
(Brazil) B Haddad Maia (Germany) L Siegemund | 6 | 4 | [7]
A Panova (Hungary) F Stollár | 2 | 4
(France) K Mladenovic (China) S Zhang | 6 | 6

Semifinals
1 | (Czech Republic) K Siniaková (United States) T Townsend | 7 | 7
(France) K Mladenovic (China) S Zhang | 5 | 5

=== Bottom half ===
First round
8 | (Kazakhstan) A Danilina; I Khromacheva | 6 | 6
A Potapova; Y Sizikova | 1 | 3
(Spain) C Bucșa (Japan) M Kato | 6 | 4 | [4]
(United States) B Mattek-Sands (Brazil) L Stefani | 1 | 6 | [10]
(United States) D Krawczyk (Mexico) G Olmos | 7 | 6
(Japan) S Aoyama (Japan) E Hozumi | 5 | 3
6 | (Chinese Taipei) H-c Chan; V Kudermetova | 4 | 2
(Slovakia) T Mihalíková (United Kingdom) O Nicholls | 6 | 6
WC | (China) X Jiang (Chinese Taipei) F-h Wu | 0 | 0
PR | (China) Y Xu (China) Z Yang | 6 | 6
(Czech Republic) L Nosková (Kazakhstan) Y Putintseva | 6 | 6
(China) Xin Wang (China) S Zheng | 3 | 4

Second round
8 | (Kazakhstan) A Danilina; I Khromacheva | 5 | 6^{0}
(United States) B Mattek-Sands (Brazil) L Stefani | 7 | 7^{7}
(United States) D Krawczyk (Mexico) G Olmos | 2 | 2
3 | (Chinese Taipei) S-w Hsieh (Latvia) J Ostapenko | 6 | 6
(Slovakia) T Mihalíková (United Kingdom) O Nicholls | 3 | 1
PR | (China) Y Xu (China) Z Yang | 6 | 6
(Czech Republic) L Nosková (Kazakhstan) Y Putintseva | 4 | 6 | [10]
2 | (Canada) G Dabrowski (New Zealand) E Routliffe | 6 | 3 | [2]

Quarterfinals
(United States) B Mattek-Sands (Brazil) L Stefani | 5 | 7 | [3]
3 | (Chinese Taipei) S-w Hsieh (Latvia) J Ostapenko | 7 | 5 | [10]
PR | (China) Y Xu (China) Z Yang | 6 | 3 | [10]
(Czech Republic) L Nosková (Kazakhstan) Y Putintseva | 4 | 6 | [8]

Semifinals
3 | (Chinese Taipei) S-w Hsieh (Latvia) J Ostapenko | 6 | 4 | [10]
PR | (China) Y Xu (China) Z Yang | 4 | 6 | [2]
