= 2025 National Bank Open – Men's doubles =

Men's doubles
- 2025 National Bank Open

Final
- Champions: (United Kingdom) Julian Cash (United Kingdom) Lloyd Glasspool
- Runners-up: (United Kingdom) Joe Salisbury (United Kingdom) Neal Skupski
- Score: 6–3, 6–7^{(5–7)}, [13–11]

Details
- Draw: 32
- Seeds: 8

Events
Singles	men	women
Doubles	men	women
- National Bank Open

Julian Cash and Lloyd Glasspool defeated Joe Salisbury and Neal Skupski in the final, 6–3, 6–7^{(5–7)}, [13–11] to win the men's doubles tennis title at the 2025 Canadian Open, saving four championships points in the process. It was the first Masters 1000 title for both players. With the win, they achieved a 19-match winning streak across four tournaments (Queen's Club, Eastbourne, Wimbledon, and Toronto) and became the first team to qualify for the 2025 ATP Finals. This was the first all-British Masters 1000 final, and the fourth on the ATP Tour in the Open Era.

Marcel Granollers and Horacio Zeballos were the reigning champions, but Granollers withdrew before the tournament began. Zeballos partnered Austin Krajicek, but lost in the second round to Salisbury and Skupski.

== Seeds ==
1. (El Salvador) Marcelo Arévalo / (Croatia) Mate Pavić (quarterfinals)
2. (United Kingdom) Julian Cash / (United Kingdom) Lloyd Glasspool (champions)
3. (Finland) Harri Heliövaara / (United Kingdom) Henry Patten (second round)
4. (Germany) Kevin Krawietz / (Germany) Tim Pütz (semifinals)
5. (Italy) Simone Bolelli / (Italy) Andrea Vavassori (first round)
6. (United Kingdom) Joe Salisbury / (United Kingdom) Neal Skupski (final)
7. (United States) Christian Harrison / (United States) Evan King (first round)
8. (Monaco) Hugo Nys / (France) Édouard Roger-Vasselin (second round)

== Draw ==
Key

- Q = Qualifier
- WC = Wild card
- LL = Lucky loser
- Alt = Alternate
- ITF = ITF entry
- PR = Protected ranking
- SR = Special ranking
- SE = Special exempt
- JE = Junior exempt
- JR = Junior Accelerator Programme entrant
- CO = College Accelerator Programme entrant
- NG = Next Gen Accelerator Program entrant
- w/o = Walkover
- r = Retired
- d = Defaulted

=== Finals ===
Semifinals
6	(United Kingdom) Joe Salisbury (United Kingdom) Neal Skupski	7^{7}	6
(Argentina) Máximo González (Argentina) Andrés Molteni	6^{5}	2
4	(Germany) Kevin Krawietz (Germany) Tim Pütz	3	6^{2}
2	(United Kingdom) Julian Cash (United Kingdom) Lloyd Glasspool	6	7^{7}

Final
6	(United Kingdom) Joe Salisbury (United Kingdom) Neal Skupski	3	7^{7}	[11]
2	(United Kingdom) Julian Cash (United Kingdom) Lloyd Glasspool	6	6^{5}	[13]

=== Top half ===
First round
1	(El Salvador) M Arévalo (Croatia) M Pavić	7^{11}	7^{7}
(Czech Republic) J Lehečka (Czech Republic) J Menšík	6^{9}	6^{5}
(Croatia) N Mektić (United States) R Ram	6^{8}	6	[10]
(France) S Doumbia (France) F Reboul	7^{10}	3	[5]
(United States) A Krajicek (Argentina) H Zeballos	7	6
(Australia) A de Minaur (Australia) M Ebden	5	2
(Brazil) M Melo (Germany) A Zverev	3	4
6	(United Kingdom) J Salisbury (United Kingdom) N Skupski	6	6
3	(Finland) H Heliövaara (United Kingdom) H Patten	7^{7}	6^{5}	[10]
(Italy) L Musetti (Italy) L Sonego	6^{3}	7^{7}	[3]
(United States) R Galloway (United States) B Nakashima	4	6	[4]
Alt	(Brazil) F Romboli (Australia) J-P Smith	6	1	[10]
K Khachanov; A Rublev	5	2
(Sweden) A Göransson (Netherlands) S Verbeek	7	6
(Argentina) M González (Argentina) A Molteni	7^{7}	7
5	(Italy) S Bolelli (Italy) A Vavassori	6^{5}	5

Second round
1	(El Salvador) M Arévalo (Croatia) M Pavić	6	6
(Croatia) N Mektić (United States) R Ram	3	4
(United States) A Krajicek (Argentina) H Zeballos	6^{2}	1
6	(United Kingdom) J Salisbury (United Kingdom) N Skupski	7^{7}	6
3	(Finland) H Heliövaara (United Kingdom) H Patten	4	7^{11}	[7]
Alt	(Brazil) F Romboli (Australia) J-P Smith	6	6^{9}	[10]
(Sweden) A Göransson (Netherlands) S Verbeek	6	6^{5}	[8]
(Argentina) M González (Argentina) A Molteni	4	7^{7}	[10]

Quarterfinals
1	(El Salvador) M Arévalo (Croatia) M Pavić	7^{7}	4	[8]
6	(United Kingdom) J Salisbury (United Kingdom) N Skupski	6^{3}	6	[10]
Alt	(Brazil) F Romboli (Australia) J-P Smith	6^{3}	3
(Argentina) M González (Argentina) A Molteni	7^{7}	6

Semifinals
6	(United Kingdom) J Salisbury (United Kingdom) N Skupski	7^{7}	6
(Argentina) M González (Argentina) A Molteni	6^{5}	2

=== Bottom half ===
First round
8	(Monaco) H Nys (France) É Roger-Vasselin	6	6
(Portugal) N Borges (Czech Republic) T Macháč	2	3
(United States) N Lammons (United States) J Withrow	6	3	[8]
(France) A Fils (United States) B Shelton	4	6	[10]
(United States) A Michelsen (United States) F Tiafoe	7^{8}	6
WC	(Canada) G Diallo (Canada) A Galarneau	6^{6}	2
(Spain) P Martínez (Norway) C Ruud	2	3
4	(Germany) K Krawietz (Germany) T Pütz	6	6
7	(United States) C Harrison (United States) E King	5	5
WC	(Canada) L Draxl (Canada) C Harper	7	7
(Argentina) G Andreozzi (Netherlands) S Arends	6	6
WC	(Canada) N Arseneault (Canada) J Boulais	0	3
(India) Y Bhambri (New Zealand) M Venus	4	6	[10]
(Australia) J Peers (Poland) J Zieliński	6	3	[12]
(Italy) F Cobolli (Spain) A Davidovich Fokina	4	6	[13]
2	(United Kingdom) J Cash (United Kingdom) L Glasspool	6	4	[15]

Second round
8	(Monaco) H Nys (France) É Roger-Vasselin	4	5
(France) A Fils (United States) B Shelton	6	7
(United States) A Michelsen (United States) F Tiafoe	4	3
4	(Germany) K Krawietz (Germany) T Pütz	6	6
WC	(Canada) L Draxl (Canada) C Harper	5	6^{3}
(Argentina) G Andreozzi (Netherlands) S Arends	7	7^{7}
(Australia) J Peers (Poland) J Zieliński	2	7^{7}	[8]
2	(United Kingdom) J Cash (United Kingdom) L Glasspool	6	6^{3}	[10]

Quarterfinals
(France) A Fils (United States) B Shelton
4	(Germany) K Krawietz (Germany) T Pütz	w/o
(Argentina) G Andreozzi (Netherlands) S Arends	6^{5}	3
2	(United Kingdom) J Cash (United Kingdom) L Glasspool	7^{7}	6

Semifinals
4	(Germany) K Krawietz (Germany) T Pütz	3	6^{2}
2	(United Kingdom) J Cash (United Kingdom) L Glasspool	6	7^{7}

== Seeded teams ==
The following are the seeded teams. Seedings are based on ATP rankings as of 21 July 2025.

Country	Player	Country	Player	Rank	Seed
ESA	Marcelo Arévalo	CRO	Mate Pavić	2	1
GBR	Julian Cash	GBR	Lloyd Glasspool	7	2
FIN	Harri Heliövaara	GBR	Henry Patten	10	3
GER	Kevin Krawietz	GER	Tim Pütz	19	4
ITA	Simone Bolelli	ITA	Andrea Vavassori	26	5
GBR	Joe Salisbury	GBR	Neal Skupski	29	6
USA	Christian Harrison	USA	Evan King	35	7
MON	Hugo Nys	FRA	Édouard Roger-Vasselin	41	8

== Other entry information ==
=== Wildcards ===
- (Canada) Nicolas Arseneault / (Canada) Justin Boulais
- (Canada) Gabriel Diallo / (Canada) Alexis Galarneau
- (Canada) Liam Draxl / (Canada) Cleeve Harper

=== Alternates ===
- ~~(Argentina) Francisco Cerúndolo / (Argentina) Camilo Ugo Carabelli~~
- (Brazil) Fernando Romboli / (Australia) John-Patrick Smith

=== Withdrawals ===
- ‡ (Netherlands) Sander Arends / (United Kingdom) Luke Johnson → replaced by (Argentina) Guido Andreozzi / (Netherlands) Sander Arends
- § (Canada) Félix Auger-Aliassime / (Canada) Denis Shapovalov → replaced by (Brazil) Fernando Romboli / (Australia) John-Patrick Smith
- ‡ (Spain) Marcel Granollers / (Argentina) Horacio Zeballos → replaced by (United States) Austin Krajicek / (Argentina) Horacio Zeballos
- ‡ (Netherlands) Tallon Griekspoor / (Netherlands) David Pel → replaced by (United States) Nathaniel Lammons / (United States) Jackson Withrow

‡ – withdrew from entry list
§ – withdrew from main draw
