= 2025 Dubai Tennis Championships =

Tennis tournament

- Date: 16–22 February (women); 24 February – 1 March (men)
- Edition: 33rd (men) / 25th (women)
- Category: ATP Tour 500 (men); WTA 1000 (women)
- Draw: 32S / 16D / 16Q (men); 56S / 28D / 32Q (women)
- Surface: Hard, Outdoor
- Location: Dubai, United Arab Emirates
- Venue: Aviation Club Tennis Centre

Champions

Men's singles
- (Greece) Stefanos Tsitsipas

Women's singles
- Mirra Andreeva

Men's doubles
- (India) Yuki Bhambri / (Australia) Alexei Popyrin

Women's doubles
- (Czech Republic) Kateřina Siniaková / (United States) Taylor Townsend
- Dubai Tennis Championships

The 2025 Dubai Tennis Championships (also known as the Dubai Duty Free Tennis Championships for sponsorship reasons) was a professional ATP 500 event on the 2025 ATP Tour and a WTA 1000 tournament on the 2025 WTA Tour. Both events took place at the Aviation Club Tennis Centre in Dubai, United Arab Emirates. The women's tournament took place from February 16 to 22, and the men's tournament from February 24 to March 1.

== Champions ==
=== Men's singles ===
- (Greece) Stefanos Tsitsipas def. (Canada) Félix Auger-Aliassime, 6–3, 6–3

=== Women's singles ===
- Mirra Andreeva def. (Denmark) Clara Tauson, 7–6^{(7–1)}, 6–1

=== Men's doubles ===
- (India) Yuki Bhambri / (Australia) Alexei Popyrin def. (United Kingdom) Henry Patten / (Finland) Harri Heliövaara, 3–6, 7–6^{(14–12)}, [10–8]

=== Women's doubles ===
- (Czech Republic) Kateřina Siniaková / (United States) Taylor Townsend def. (Chinese Taipei) Hsieh Su-wei / (Latvia) Jeļena Ostapenko, 7–6^{(7–5)}, 6–4

== Points and prize money ==
=== Point distribution ===
Event	W	F	SF	QF	Round of 16	Round of 32	Round of 64	Q	Q2	Q1
Men's singles	500	330	200	100	50	0	—N/a	25	13	0
Men's doubles	500	300	180	90	0	—N/a	—N/a	45	25	0
Women's singles	1000	650	390	215	120	65*	10	30	20	2
Women's doubles	1000	650	390	215	120*	10	—N/a	—N/a	—N/a	—N/a

=== Prize money ===
Event	W	F	SF	QF	Round of 16	Round of 32	Round of 64	Q	Q2	Q1
Men's singles	$605,530	$325,780	$173,620	$88,700	$47,350	$25,250	—N/a	—N/a	$12,940	$7,260
Men's doubles**	$198,880	$106,060	$53,660	$26,840	$13,890	—N/a	—N/a	—N/a	—N/a	—N/a
Women's singles	$597,000	$351,801	$181,400	$83,470	$41,600	$23,500	$16,900	—N/a	$10,074	$5,270
Women's doubles**	$175,900	$98,950	$53,140	$27,280	$15,570	$10,380	—N/a	—N/a	—N/a	—N/a

* Players with byes receive first-round points.
** Per team.

== ATP singles main-draw entrants ==
=== Seeds ===
Country	Player	Rank^{1}	Seed
	Daniil Medvedev	6	1
AUS	Alex de Minaur	8	2
	Andrey Rublev	10	3
GRE	Stefanos Tsitsipas	11	4
FRA	Ugo Humbert	14	5
BUL	Grigor Dimitrov	15	6
~~GBR~~	~~Jack Draper~~	~~16~~	~~7~~
FRA	Arthur Fils	19	8

- Rankings are as of 17 February 2025.

=== Other entrants ===
The following players received wildcards into the singles main draw:

- (Tunisia) Aziz Dougaz
- (United Kingdom) Dan Evans
- (Lebanon) Hady Habib

The following player received entry using a protected ranking:

- (Croatia) Marin Čilić

The following players received entry from the qualifying draw:

- (Hungary) Márton Fucsovics
- (France) Quentin Halys
- (Australia) Christopher O'Connell
- Roman Safiullin

The following player received entry as a lucky loser:

- (Italy) Luca Nardi

=== Withdrawals ===
- (United Kingdom) Jack Draper → replaced by (Italy) Luca Nardi
- (Australia) Jordan Thompson → replaced by (Spain) Roberto Bautista Agut

== ATP doubles main-draw entrants ==
=== Seeds ===
Country	Player	Country	Player	Rank^{1}	Seed
ESA	Marcelo Arévalo	CRO	Mate Pavić	2	1
FIN	Harri Heliövaara	GBR	Henry Patten	7	2
GER	Kevin Krawietz	GER	Tim Pütz	11	3
ITA	Simone Bolelli	ITA	Andrea Vavassori	15	4

- Rankings are as of 17 February 2025

=== Other entrants ===
The following pairs received wildcards into the doubles main draw:

- (India) Jeevan Nedunchezhiyan / (India) Vijay Sundar Prashanth
- (Greece) Pavlos Tsitsipas / (Greece) Petros Tsitsipas

The following pair received entry from the qualifying draw:

- (Netherlands) Robin Haase / (Germany) Hendrik Jebens

=== Withdrawals ===
- (Portugal) Nuno Borges / (Spain) Marcel Granollers → replaced by (India) Yuki Bhambri / (Australia) Alexei Popyrin
- (Czech Republic) Adam Pavlásek / (Australia) Jordan Thompson → replaced by (Netherlands) Tallon Griekspoor / (Czech Republic) Adam Pavlásek

== WTA doubles main-draw entrants ==
=== Seeds ===
Country	Player	Country	Player	Rank^{1}	Seed
CZE	Kateřina Siniaková	USA	Taylor Townsend	4	1
CAN	Gabriela Dabrowski	NZL	Erin Routliffe	6	2
TPE	Hsieh Su-wei	LAT	Jeļena Ostapenko	13	3
~~ITA~~	~~Sara Errani~~	~~ITA~~	~~Jasmine Paolini~~	~~21~~	~~4~~
BEL	Elise Mertens	AUS	Ellen Perez	30	5
TPE	Chan Hao-ching		Veronika Kudermetova	31	6
USA	Sofia Kenin	UKR	Lyudmyla Kichenok	33	7
KAZ	Anna Danilina		Irina Khromacheva	36	8

- Rankings are as of 10 February 2025.

=== Other entrants ===
The following pairs received wildcards into the doubles main draw:

- (Japan) Aoi Ito / Ekaterina Yashina
- (China) Jiang Xinyu / (Chinese Taipei) Wu Fang-hsien

The following pair entered using a protected ranking:

- (China) Xu Yifan / (China) Yang Zhaoxuan
