= 2025 Dubai Tennis Championships – Men's singles =

Men's singles
- 2025 Dubai Tennis Championships

Final
- Champion: (Greece) Stefanos Tsitsipas
- Runner-up: (Canada) Félix Auger-Aliassime
- Score: 6–3, 6–3

Details
- Draw: 32 (3WC, 4Q)
- Seeds: 8

Events
| Singles | men | women |
| Doubles | men | women |
| ← 2024 · | Dubai Tennis Championships | · 2026 → |

Stefanos Tsitsipas defeated Félix Auger-Aliassime in the final, 6–3, 6–3 to win the men's singles tennis title at the 2025 Dubai Tennis Championships. It was his first ATP 500 title (after losing eleven previous finals at this level) and 12th ATP Tour title overall.

Ugo Humbert was the defending champion, but lost in the second round to Tallon Griekspoor.

== Seeds ==
1. Daniil Medvedev (quarterfinals)
2. (Australia) Alex de Minaur (first round)
3. Andrey Rublev (first round)
4. (Greece) Stefanos Tsitsipas (champion)
5. (France) Ugo Humbert (second round)
6. (Bulgaria) Grigor Dimitrov (first round, retired)
7. (United Kingdom) Jack Draper (withdrew)
8. (France) Arthur Fils (first round)

== Draw ==
=== Key ===
- Q = Qualifier
- WC = Wild card
- LL = Lucky loser
- Alt = Alternate
- SE = Special exempt
- PR = Protected ranking
- ITF = ITF entry
- JE = Junior exempt
- w/o = Walkover
- r = Retired
- d = Defaulted
- SR = Special ranking

=== Finals ===
Semifinals
(Netherlands) Tallon Griekspoor | 4 | 4
4 | (Greece) Stefanos Tsitsipas | 6 | 6
Q | (France) Quentin Halys | 7 | 4 | 3
(Canada) Félix Auger-Aliassime | 5 | 6 | 6

Final
4 | (Greece) Stefanos Tsitsipas | 6 | 6
(Canada) Félix Auger-Aliassime | 3 | 3

=== Top half ===
First round
1 | D Medvedev | 6 | 7^{7}
(Germany) J-L Struff | 4 | 6^{4}
(France) G Mpetshi Perricard | 6 | 7^{7}
(China) Z Zhang | 3 | 6^{3}
Q | R Safiullin | 7 | 6^{4} | 6^{1}
(Netherlands) T Griekspoor | 5 | 7^{7} | 7^{7}
(Czech Republic) J Lehečka | 3 | 0
5 | (France) U Humbert | 6 | 6
4 | (Greece) S Tsitsipas | 7^{7} | 6
(Italy) L Sonego | 6^{4} | 3
WC | (United Kingdom) D Evans | 1 | 3
K Khachanov | 6 | 6
(France) G Monfils | 5 | 4
(Italy) M Berrettini | 7 | 6
Q | (Australia) C O'Connell | 6 | 0
6 | (Bulgaria) G Dimitrov | 0 | 0^{r}

Second round
1 | D Medvedev | 6 | 6
(France) G Mpetshi Perricard | 4 | 4
(Netherlands) T Griekspoor | 4 | 6 | 6
5 | (France) U Humbert | 6 | 3 | 2
4 | (Greece) S Tsitsipas | 7^{7} | 2 | 6
K Khachanov | 6^{4} | 6 | 4
(Italy) M Berrettini | 7^{7} | 6
Q | (Australia) C O'Connell | 6^{2} | 2

Quarterfinals
1 | D Medvedev | 6 | 6^{7} | 5
(Netherlands) T Griekspoor | 2 | 7^{9} | 7
4 | (Greece) S Tsitsipas | 7^{7} | 1 | 6
(Italy) M Berrettini | 6^{5} | 6 | 4

Semifinals
(Netherlands) T Griekspoor | 4 | 4
4 | (Greece) S Tsitsipas | 6 | 6

=== Bottom half ===
First round
LL | (Italy) L Nardi | 1 | 6 | 6
Q | (Hungary) M Fucsovics | 6 | 2 | 3
WC | (Tunisia) A Dougaz | 3 | 3
(Belgium) Z Bergs | 6 | 6
(Hungary) F Marozsán | 6 | 3 | 6^{4}
(Spain) R Bautista Agut | 3 | 6 | 7^{7}
Q | (France) Q Halys | 3 | 6 | 7^{7}
3 | A Rublev | 6 | 4 | 6^{5}
8 | (France) A Fils | 2 | 1
(Portugal) N Borges | 6 | 6
(Kazakhstan) A Bublik | 6^{7} | 7^{7} | 3
(Canada) F Auger-Aliassime | 7^{9} | 6^{4} | 6
(Australia) A Popyrin | 6 | 6
WC | (Lebanon) H Habib | 2 | 4
PR | (Croatia) M Čilić | 6 | 3 | 6
2 | (Australia) A de Minaur | 2 | 6 | 3

Second round
LL | (Italy) L Nardi | 6 | 7^{7}
(Belgium) Z Bergs | 4 | 6^{3}
(Spain) R Bautista Agut | 6^{5} | 4
Q | (France) Q Halys | 7^{7} | 6
(Portugal) N Borges | 6 | 3 | 5
(Canada) F Auger-Aliassime | 4 | 6 | 7
(Australia) A Popyrin | 7 | 3 | 4
PR | (Croatia) M Čilić | 5 | 6 | 6

Quarterfinals
LL | (Italy) L Nardi | 6 | 3 | 6^{5}
Q | (France) Q Halys | 2 | 6 | 7^{7}
(Canada) F Auger-Aliassime | 6 | 3 | 6
PR | (Croatia) M Čilić | 4 | 6 | 2

Semifinals
Q | (France) Q Halys | 7 | 4 | 3
(Canada) F Auger-Aliassime | 5 | 6 | 6

== Qualifying ==
=== Seeds ===
1. Roman Safiullin (qualified)
2. (France) Quentin Halys (qualified)
3. (Australia) Christopher O'Connell (qualified)
4. (Hungary) Márton Fucsovics (qualified)
5. (Italy) Luca Nardi (qualifying competition, lucky loser)
6. (Netherlands) Botic van de Zandschulp (qualifying competition)
7. (Finland) Otto Virtanen (qualifying competition)
8. Pavel Kotov (qualifying competition)

=== Qualifiers ===
1. Roman Safiullin
2. (France) Quentin Halys
3. (Australia) Christopher O'Connell
4. (Hungary) Márton Fucsovics

=== Lucky loser ===
1. (Italy) Luca Nardi

=== Qualifying draw ===
==== First qualifier ====
First round
1 | Roman Safiullin | 7^{7} | 3 | 6
WC | (Georgia (country)) Nikoloz Basilashvili | 6^{1} | 6 | 3
(Kazakhstan) Mikhail Kukushkin | 1 | 5
7 | (Finland) Otto Virtanen | 6 | 7

Qualifying competition
1 | Roman Safiullin | 6 | 7^{7}
7 | (Finland) Otto Virtanen | 3 | 6^{5}

==== Second qualifier ====
First round
2 | (France) Quentin Halys | 6 | 7^{7}
(Japan) Yasutaka Uchiyama | 3 | 6^{4}
PR | (Japan) Yosuke Watanuki | 3 | 3
8 | Pavel Kotov | 6 | 6

Qualifying competition
2 | (France) Quentin Halys | 7^{7} | 7
8 | Pavel Kotov | 6^{3} | 5

==== Third qualifier ====
First round
3 | (Australia) Christopher O'Connell | 6 | 6
WC | (United Arab Emirates) Abdulrahman Al Janahi | 2 | 0
WC | (Italy) Andrea Vavassori | 1 | 3
6 | (Netherlands) Botic van de Zandschulp | 6 | 6

Qualifying competition
3 | (Australia) Christopher O'Connell | 7^{7} | 6
6 | (Netherlands) Botic van de Zandschulp | 6^{5} | 4

==== Fourth qualifier ====
First round
4 | (Hungary) Márton Fucsovics | 6 | 6
(Slovakia) Jozef Kovalík | 0 | 1
(South Africa) Lloyd Harris | 3 | 5
5 | (Italy) Luca Nardi | 6 | 7

Qualifying competition
4 | (Hungary) Márton Fucsovics | 7^{7} | 6
5 | (Italy) Luca Nardi | 6^{5} | 4
