= 2025 Miami Open – Men's doubles =

Men's doubles
- 2025 Miami Open

Final
- Champions: (El Salvador) Marcelo Arévalo (Croatia) Mate Pavić
- Runners-up: (United Kingdom) Julian Cash (United Kingdom) Lloyd Glasspool
- Score: 7–6^{(7–3)}, 6–3

Events
| Singles | men | women |
| Doubles | men | women |
- Miami Open

Marcelo Arévalo and Mate Pavić defeated Julian Cash and Lloyd Glasspool in the final, 7–6^{(7–3)}, 6–3 to win the men's doubles tennis title at the 2025 Miami Open. They completed the Sunshine Double, having already won Indian Wells; Arévalo and Pavić were the first pair to accomplish the feat since Pierre-Hugues Herbert and Nicolas Mahut in 2016, and the sixth pair in history to do so.

Rohan Bopanna and Matthew Ebden were the defending champions, but chose not to compete together this year. Bopanna partnered Ivan Dodig, but lost in the first round to Yuki Bhambri and Nuno Borges. Ebden partnered John Peers, but lost in the second round to Arévalo and Pavić.

== Seeds ==
1. (El Salvador) Marcelo Arévalo / (Croatia) Mate Pavić (champions)
2. (Finland) Harri Heliövaara / (United Kingdom) Henry Patten (semifinals)
3. (Italy) Simone Bolelli / (Italy) Andrea Vavassori (second round)
4. (Spain) Marcel Granollers / (Argentina) Horacio Zeballos (first round)
5. (Croatia) Nikola Mektić / (New Zealand) Michael Venus (semifinals)
6. (United Kingdom) Julian Cash / (United Kingdom) Lloyd Glasspool (final)
7. (Argentina) Máximo González / (Argentina) Andrés Molteni (quarterfinals)
8. (United Kingdom) Joe Salisbury / (United Kingdom) Neal Skupski (first round)

== Draw ==
Key

- Q = Qualifier
- WC = Wild card
- LL = Lucky loser
- Alt = Alternate
- ITF = ITF entry
- PR = Protected ranking
- SR = Special ranking
- SE = Special exempt
- JE = Junior exempt
- JR = Junior Accelerator Programme entrant
- CO = College Accelerator Programme entrant
- NG = Next Gen Accelerator Program entrant
- w/o = Walkover
- r = Retired
- d = Defaulted

=== Finals ===
Semifinals
1 | (El Salvador) Marcelo Arévalo (Croatia) Mate Pavić | 2 | 7^{7} | [10]
5 | (Croatia) Nikola Mektić (New Zealand) Michael Venus | 6 | 6^{4} | [5]
6 | (United Kingdom) Julian Cash (United Kingdom) Lloyd Glasspool | 7^{9} | 7^{7}
2 | (Finland) Harri Heliövaara (United Kingdom) Henry Patten | 6^{7} | 6^{5}

Final
1 | (El Salvador) Marcelo Arévalo (Croatia) Mate Pavić | 7^{7} | 6
6 | (United Kingdom) Julian Cash (United Kingdom) Lloyd Glasspool | 6^{3} | 3

=== Top half ===
First round
1 | (El Salvador) M Arévalo (Croatia) M Pavić | 6 | 6
(Brazil) R Matos (Brazil) M Melo | 4 | 2
(Australia) M Ebden (Australia) J Peers | 6 | 7^{8}
(Argentina) F Cerúndolo (Argentina) TM Etcheverry | 4 | 6^{6}
(Mexico) S González (Chile) A Tabilo | 4 | 2
(Belgium) S Gillé (Poland) J Zieliński | 6 | 6
(Austria) A Erler (Germany) C Frantzen | 3 | 3
7 | (Argentina) M González (Argentina) A Molteni | 6 | 6
3 | (Italy) S Bolelli (Italy) A Vavassori | 6 | 6
(Uruguay) A Behar (United States) R Galloway | 2 | 4
(United States) C Harrison (United States) E King | 3 | 6 | [10]
WC | (Japan) R Sakamoto (Hong Kong) C Wong | 6 | 2 | [6]
Alt | (Monaco) H Nys (France) É Roger-Vasselin | 6 | 6^{8} | [10]
(France) S Doumbia (France) F Reboul | 3 | 7^{10} | [4]
WC | (United States) M McDonald (United States) L Tien | 6 | 3 | [5]
5 | (Croatia) N Mektić (New Zealand) M Venus | 3 | 6 | [10]

Second round
1 | (El Salvador) M Arévalo (Croatia) M Pavić | 6 | 3 | [10]
(Australia) M Ebden (Australia) J Peers | 4 | 6 | [7]
(Belgium) S Gillé (Poland) J Zieliński | 3 | 6^{6}
7 | (Argentina) M González (Argentina) A Molteni | 6 | 7^{8}
3 | (Italy) S Bolelli (Italy) A Vavassori | 3 | 7^{7} | [6]
(United States) C Harrison (United States) E King | 6 | 6^{5} | [10]
Alt | (Monaco) H Nys (France) É Roger-Vasselin | 3 | 3
5 | (Croatia) N Mektić (New Zealand) M Venus | 6 | 6

Quarterfinals
1 | (El Salvador) M Arévalo (Croatia) M Pavić | 4 | 7 | [10]
7 | (Argentina) M González (Argentina) A Molteni | 6 | 5 | [8]
(United States) C Harrison (United States) E King | 4 | 6 | [7]
5 | (Croatia) N Mektić (New Zealand) M Venus | 6 | 3 | [10]

Semifinals
1 | (El Salvador) M Arévalo (Croatia) M Pavić | 2 | 7^{7} | [10]
5 | (Croatia) N Mektić (New Zealand) M Venus | 6 | 6^{4} | [5]

=== Bottom half ===
First round
6 | (United Kingdom) J Cash (United Kingdom) L Glasspool | 7^{7} | 6
WC | (United States) R Cash (United States) JJ Tracy | 6^{2} | 0
(Spain) P Martínez (France) G Mpetshi Perricard | 6^{3} | 6 | [10]
(Sweden) A Göransson (Netherlands) S Verbeek | 7^{7} | 4 | [7]
(India) R Bopanna (Croatia) I Dodig | 4 | 6 | [7]
(India) Y Bhambri (Portugal) N Borges | 6 | 3 | [10]
(United Kingdom) J Murray (Czech Republic) A Pavlásek | 7^{7} | 3 | [10]
4 | (Spain) M Granollers (Argentina) H Zeballos | 6^{5} | 6 | [7]
8 | (United Kingdom) J Salisbury (United Kingdom) N Skupski | 6 | 5 | [6]
(Argentina) G Andreozzi (France) T Arribagé | 4 | 7 | [10]
(United States) S Korda (Australia) J Thompson | 6 | 6
(United States) A Michelsen (United States) B Shelton | 4 | 4
(Germany) H Jebens (France) A Olivetti | 6^{3} | 3
(Belgium) J Vliegen (United States) J Withrow | 7^{7} | 6
(United States) A Krajicek (United States) R Ram | 7^{7} | 4 | [3]
2 | (Finland) H Heliövaara (United Kingdom) H Patten | 6^{3} | 6 | [10]

Second round
6 | (United Kingdom) J Cash (United Kingdom) L Glasspool | 7 | 6
(Spain) P Martínez (France) G Mpetshi Perricard | 5 | 4
(India) Y Bhambri (Portugal) N Borges | 7^{7} | 6
(United Kingdom) J Murray (Czech Republic) A Pavlásek | 6^{4} | 2
(Argentina) G Andreozzi (France) T Arribagé | 6^{4} | 4
(United States) S Korda (Australia) J Thompson | 7^{7} | 6
(Belgium) J Vliegen (United States) J Withrow | 6^{5} | 4
2 | (Finland) H Heliövaara (United Kingdom) H Patten | 7^{7} | 6

Quarterfinals
6 | (United Kingdom) J Cash (United Kingdom) L Glasspool | 7^{7} | 3 | [10]
(India) Y Bhambri (Portugal) N Borges | 6^{1} | 6 | [8]
(United States) S Korda (Australia) J Thompson
2 | (Finland) H Heliövaara (United Kingdom) H Patten | w/o

Semifinals
6 | (United Kingdom) J Cash (United Kingdom) L Glasspool | 7^{9} | 7^{7}
2 | (Finland) H Heliövaara (United Kingdom) H Patten | 6^{7} | 6^{5}

== Seeded teams ==
The following are the seeded teams. Seedings are based on ATP rankings as of 17 March 2025.

| Country | Player | Country | Player | Rank | Seed |
|---|---|---|---|---|---|
| ESA | Marcelo Arévalo | CRO | Mate Pavić | 2 | 1 |
| FIN | Harri Heliövaara | GBR | Henry Patten | 7 | 2 |
| ITA | Simone Bolelli | ITA | Andrea Vavassori | 17 | 3 |
| ESP | Marcel Granollers | ARG | Horacio Zeballos | 21 | 4 |
| CRO | Nikola Mektić | NZL | Michael Venus | 27 | 5 |
| GBR | Julian Cash | GBR | Lloyd Glasspool | 33 | 6 |
| ARG | Máximo González | ARG | Andrés Molteni | 40 | 7 |
| GBR | Joe Salisbury | GBR | Neal Skupski | 48 | 8 |

== Other entry information ==
=== Wildcards ===
- (United States) Robert Cash / (United States) JJ Tracy
- (United States) Mackenzie McDonald / (United States) Learner Tien
- (Japan) Rei Sakamoto / (Hong Kong) Coleman Wong

=== Alternates ===
- (Monaco) Hugo Nys / (France) Édouard Roger-Vasselin

=== Withdrawals ===
- (Netherlands) Sander Arends / (United Kingdom) Luke Johnson → replaced by (Argentina) Guido Andreozzi / (France) Théo Arribagé
- (Germany) Kevin Krawietz / (Germany) Tim Pütz → replaced by (Monaco) Hugo Nys / (France) Édouard Roger-Vasselin
