= 2025 Dubai Tennis Championships – Men's doubles =

Men's doubles
- 2025 Dubai Tennis Championships

Final
- Champions: (India) Yuki Bhambri (Australia) Alexei Popyrin
- Runners-up: (Finland) Harri Heliövaara (United Kingdom) Henry Patten
- Score: 3–6, 7–6^{(14–12)}, [10–8]

Details
- Draw: 16
- Seeds: 4

Events
Singles	men	women
Doubles	men	women
- Dubai Tennis Championships

Yuki Bhambri and Alexei Popyrin defeated Harri Heliövaara and Henry Patten in the final, 3–6, 7–6^{(14–12)}, [10–8] to win the men's doubles tennis title at the 2025 Dubai Tennis Championships. It was the first ATP Tour doubles title for Popyrin, and the fourth for Bhambri.

Tallon Griekspoor and Jan-Lennard Struff were the reigning champions, but Struff did not participate this year. Griekspoor partnered Adam Pavlásek, but they lost in the first round to Kevin Krawietz and Tim Pütz.

== Seeds ==
1. (El Salvador) Marcelo Arévalo / (Croatia) Mate Pavić (first round)
2. (Finland) Harri Heliövaara / (United Kingdom) Henry Patten (final)
3. (Germany) Kevin Krawietz / (Germany) Tim Pütz (quarterfinals)
4. (Italy) Simone Bolelli / (Italy) Andrea Vavassori (quarterfinals)

== Draw ==
Key

- Q = Qualifier
- WC = Wild card
- LL = Lucky loser
- Alt = Alternate
- ITF = ITF entry
- PR = Protected ranking
- SR = Special ranking
- SE = Special exempt
- JE = Junior exempt
- JR = Junior Accelerator Programme entrant
- CO = College Accelerator Programme entrant
- NG = Next Gen Accelerator Program entrant
- w/o = Walkover
- r = Retired
- d = Defaulted

=== Draw ===
First round
1	(El Salvador) M Arévalo (Croatia) M Pavić	6	6^{1}	[3]
(India) Y Bhambri (Australia) A Popyrin	4	7^{7}	[10]
(India) R Bopanna (Croatia) I Dodig	2	4
(United Kingdom) J Cash (United Kingdom) L Glasspool	6	6
3	(Germany) K Krawietz (Germany) T Pütz	6	6
(Netherlands) T Griekspoor (Czech Republic) A Pavlásek	3	4
(United Kingdom) J Murray (Australia) J Peers	6	7^{8}
WC	(India) J Nedunchezhiyan (India) VS Prashanth	4	6^{6}
Q	(Netherlands) R Haase (Germany) H Jebens	6	6
WC	(Greece) Pa Tsitsipas (Greece) Pe Tsitsipas	2	2
K Khachanov; A Rublev	7	3	[14]
4	(Italy) S Bolelli (Italy) A Vavassori	5	6	[16]
(United Kingdom) J Salisbury (United Kingdom) N Skupski	5	6	[10]
(Australia) M Ebden (Belgium) J Vliegen	7	4	[2]
(Croatia) N Mektić (New Zealand) M Venus	7^{7}	6^{8}	[8]
2	(Finland) H Heliövaara (United Kingdom) H Patten	6^{5}	7^{10}	[10]

Quarterfinals
(India) Y Bhambri (Australia) A Popyrin	5	7^{7}	[10]
(United Kingdom) J Cash (United Kingdom) L Glasspool	7	6^{5}	[5]
3	(Germany) K Krawietz (Germany) T Pütz	3	6^{4}
(United Kingdom) J Murray (Australia) J Peers	6	7^{7}
Q	(Netherlands) R Haase (Germany) H Jebens	6	3	[12]
4	(Italy) S Bolelli (Italy) A Vavassori	4	6	[10]
(United Kingdom) J Salisbury (United Kingdom) N Skupski	4	1
2	(Finland) H Heliövaara (United Kingdom) H Patten	6	6

Semifinals
(India) Y Bhambri (Australia) A Popyrin	6	4	[10]
(United Kingdom) J Murray (Australia) J Peers	2	6	[7]
Q	(Netherlands) R Haase (Germany) H Jebens	6	3	[8]
2	(Finland) H Heliövaara (United Kingdom) H Patten	4	6	[10]

Final
(India) Y Bhambri (Australia) A Popyrin	3	7^{14}	[10]
2	(Finland) H Heliövaara (United Kingdom) H Patten	6	6^{12}	[8]

== Qualifying ==
=== Seeds ===
1. (Netherlands) Robin Haase / (Germany) Hendrik Jebens (qualified)
2. (Czech Republic) Petr Nouza / (Czech Republic) Patrik Rikl (first round)

=== Qualifiers ===
1. (Netherlands) Robin Haase / (Germany) Hendrik Jebens

=== Qualifying draw ===
First round					Qualifying competition
					1	(Netherlands) Robin Haase (Germany) Hendrik Jebens	6	6
						(Netherlands) Matwé Middelkoop (Germany) Andreas Mies	3	3
	(Netherlands) Matwé Middelkoop (Germany) Andreas Mies	3	6	[11]		(Netherlands) Matwé Middelkoop (Germany) Andreas Mies	3	3
2	(Czech Republic) Petr Nouza (Czech Republic) Patrik Rikl	6	3	[9]
