= Elena Rybakina career statistics =

Career finals
Discipline	Type	Won	Lost	Total
Singles	Grand Slam	3	1	4
Singles	WTA Finals	1	–	1
Singles	WTA 1000 (Note: Formerly known as: Category 4 & 5 & 6 (until 1990); Tier I (until 2009); Premier M and Premier 5 (until 2021))	2	5	7
Singles	WTA 500 (Note: Formerly known as: Category 3 (until 1990); Tier II (until 2009); Premier (until 2021))	7	3	10
Singles	WTA 250 (Note: Formerly known as: Category 1 & 2 (until 1990); Tier III & IV & V (until 2009); International (until 2021))	2	4	6
Singles	Olympics	–	–	–
Singles	Total	15	13	28
Doubles	Grand Slam	–	–	–
Doubles	WTA Finals	–	–	–
Doubles	WTA 1000	–	1	1
Doubles	WTA 500	–	1	1
Doubles	WTA 250	–	–	–
Doubles	Olympics	–	–	–
Doubles	Total	0	2	2

This is a list of the main career statistics of professional Kazakhstani tennis player Elena Rybakina. She has won fifteen career singles titles, and finished runner-up in thirteen more finals. She achieved her first major victory at the 2022 Wimbledon Championships, where she won the women's singles trophy, becoming the first Kazakhstani player to win a Grand Slam tournament. She also won the 2025 WTA Finals, 2026 Australian Open and 2026 US Open. She has forty-one top-10 wins, including 10 victories over the current No.1 players Aryna Sabalenka, and Iga Świątek and more over the former No. 1 players Aryna Sabalenka, Iga Świątek, Simona Halep, Karolína Plíšková, Garbiñe Muguruza, Serena Williams, and Naomi Osaka. Rybakina entered the top 20 for the first time in February 2020, and on 14 September 2026, she achieved a career-high ranking of world No. 1.

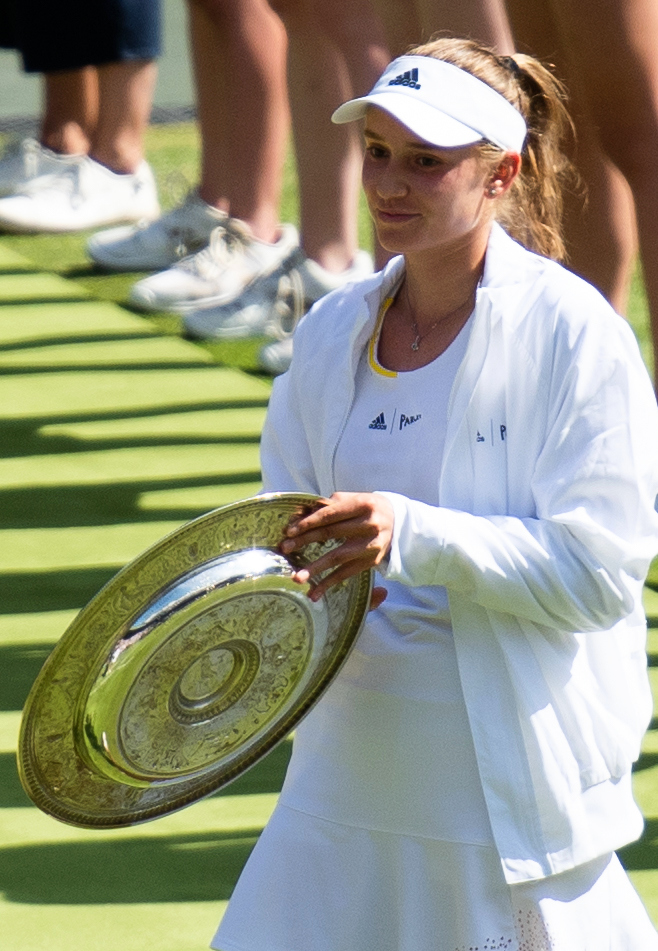
Rybakina with the Venus Rosewater Dish at the 2022 Wimbledon Championships.

== Performance timelines ==
Key
W	F	SF	QF	#R	RR	Q#	P#	DNQ	A	Z#	PO	G	S	B	NMS	NTI	P	NH

(W) winner; (F) finalist; (SF) semifinalist; (QF) quarterfinalist; (#R) rounds 4, 3, 2, 1; (RR) round-robin stage; (Q#) qualification round; (P#) preliminary round; (DNQ) did not qualify; (A) absent; (Z#) Davis/Fed Cup Zonal Group (with number indication) or (PO) play-off; (G) gold, (S) silver or (B) bronze Olympic/Paralympic medal; (NMS) not a Masters tournament; (NTI) not a Tier I tournament; (P) postponed; (NH) not held; (SR) strike rate (events won / competed); (W–L) win–loss record.
To avoid confusion and double counting, these charts are updated at the conclusion of a tournament or when the player's participation has ended.

Only main-draw results in WTA Tour, Grand Slam tournaments, Billie Jean King Cup (Fed Cup), Hopman Cup, United Cup and Olympic Games are included in win–loss records.

=== Singles ===
Current through the 2026 US Open.

Tournament	2017	2018	2019	2020	2021	2022	2023	2024	2025	2026	SR	W–L	Win %
Grand Slam tournaments
Australian Open	A	A	Q1	3R	2R	2R	F	2R	4R	W	1 / 7	21–6	78%
French Open	A	A	1R	2R	QF	3R	3R (Note: Withdrew during the tournament. Not counted as a loss.)	QF	4R	2R	0 / 8	17–7	71%
Wimbledon	A	A	Q3	NH	4R	W	QF	SF	3R	3R	1 / 6	23–5	82%
US Open	A	Q2	1R	2R	3R	1R	3R	2R	4R	W	1 / 8	15–6	71%
Win–Loss	0–0	0–0	0–2	4–3	10–4	10–3	13–3	11–3	11–4	17–2	3 / 29	76–24	76%
Year-end championships
WTA Finals	Did Not Qualify			NH (Note: Despite being cancelled due to COVID-19, Rybakina was ranked tenth on the race list, giving her the chance to be second alternative.)	DNQ		RR	RR	W	A	1 / 3	7–4	64%
National representation
Billie Jean King Cup	A	A	A	PO (Note: Edition was split into two years due to COVID-19.)		RR	RR	PO	1R	A	0 / 5	8–2	80%
Summer Olympics	Not Held				4th	Not Held		A	Not Held		0 / 1	4–2	67%
WTA 1000 tournaments
Qatar Open	NTI	A	NTI	3R	NTI	1R	NTI	F	QF	QF	0 / 5	10–4	71%
Dubai Championships	A	NTI	A	NTI	2R	NTI	3R	QF	SF	3R	0 / 5	9–3	75%
Indian Wells Open	A	A	A	NH	2R	QF	W	A	4R	F	1 / 5	16–4	80%
Miami Open	A	A	A	NH	3R	3R	F	F	2R	SF	0 / 6	16–6	73%
Madrid Open	A	A	A	NH	2R	3R	2R	SF	3R	4R	0 / 6	10–6	63%
Italian Open	A	A	A	3R	A	3R	W	A	3R	QF	1 / 5	14–4	78%
Canadian Open	A	A	A	NH	1R	2R	SF	A	SF	F	0 / 5	13–5	72%
Cincinnati Open	A	A	Q1	1R	3R	QF	3R	2R	SF	QF	0 / 7	13–7	65%
China Open	A	A	A	Not Held			SF	A	3R	2R	0 / 3	5–3	63%
Wuhan Open	A	A	QF	Not Held				A	QF	A	0 / 2	5–2	71%
Guadalajara Open	Not Held					2R	A	Not Tier I			0 / 1	1–1	50%
Win–Loss	0–0	0–0	3–1	4–2	5–6	13–8	27–5	15–4	20–10	25–8	2 / 49	112–44	72%
Career statistics
	2017	2018	2019	2020	2021	2022	2023	2024	2025	2026	SR	W–L	Win %
Tournaments	1	2	11	12	21	23	18	16	22	18	Career total: 144		
Titles	0	0	1	1	0	1	2	3	3	4	Career total: 14		
Finals	0	0	2	5	0	3	4	5	3	6	Career total: 28		
Hard Win–Loss	0–1	2–1	12–6	22–7	20–16	23–14	31–11	25–9	45–13	40–8	9 / 95	220–85	72%
Clay Win–Loss	0–0	1–1	8–3	7–3	6–4	9–5	11–2	12–2	9–3	10–3	5 / 29	73–26	74%
Grass Win–Loss	0–0	0–0	3–1	NH	7–3	8–2	5–2	6–2	5–3	3–3	1 / 17	37–16	70%
Overall Win–Loss	0–1	3–2	23–10	29–10	33–23	40–21	47–15	43–11	59–19	54–14	15 / 144	331–127	72%
Win %	0%	60%	70%	74%	59%	66%	76%	80%	76%	79%	Career total: 72%		
Year-end ranking (Note: 2016: WTA ranking–616.)	425	191	37	19	14	22	4	6	5	1	$35,539,662		

=== Doubles ===
Tournament	2017	2018	2019	2020	2021	2022	2023	2024	2025	SR	W–L	Win %
Grand Slam tournaments
Australian Open	A	A	A	2R	1R	A	3R	A	A	0 / 3	3–3	50%
French Open	A	A	A	1R	QF	1R	A	A	A	0 / 3	3–3	50%
Wimbledon	A	A	A	NH	1R	A	A	A	A	0 / 1	0–1	0%
US Open	A	A	1R	A	A	A	A	A	A	0 / 1	0–1	0%
Win–Loss	0–0	0–0	0–1	1–2	3–3	0–1	2–1	0–0	0–0	0 / 8	6–8	43%
WTA 1000 tournaments
Qatar Open	NTI	A	NTI	A	NTI	A	NTI	A	A	0 / 0	0–0	–
Dubai Championships	A	NTI	A	NTI	1R	NTI	2R	A	A	0 / 2	1–1	50%
Indian Wells Open	A	A	A	NH	F	1R	1R	A	A	0 / 3	4–3	57%
Miami Open	A	A	A	NH	1R	1R	A	A	A	0 / 2	0–2	0%
Madrid Open	A	A	A	NH	A	1R	2R	A	A	0 / 2	1–1	50%
Italian Open	A	A	A	1R	A	2R	A	A	A	0 / 2	1–1	50%
Canadian Open	A	A	A	NH	SF	A	A	A	A	0 / 1	3–1	75%
Cincinnati Open	A	A	A	1R	2R	A	A	A	A	0 / 2	1–2	33%
Wuhan Open	A	A	A	Not Held			A	A	A	0 / 0	0–0	–
China Open	A	A	A	Not Held				A	A	0 / 0	0–0	–
Career statistics
Tournaments	1	3	2	5	10	7	5	0	2	Career total: 35		
Titles	0	0	0	0	0	0	0	0	0	Career total: 0		
Finals	0	0	0	0	1	0	1	0	0	Career total: 2		
Overall Win–Loss	0–1	0–3	0–2	1–5	11–10	1–7	7–3	0–0	3–2	0 / 35	23–33	41%
Year-end ranking (Note: Doubles: 2016: WTA ranking–1166.)	682	484	516	363	49	442	119	-	266			

=== Mixed doubles ===
Tournament	2021	...	2025	SR	W–L	Win %
Australian Open	1R	A	A	0 / 1	0–1	0%
French Open	A	A	A	0 / 0	0–0	–
Wimbledon	A	A	A	0 / 0	0–0	–
US Open	A	A	1R	0 / 1	0–1	0%
Win–loss	0–1	0–0	0–1	0 / 2	0–2	0%

Note: Rybakina played under the Russian flag until 2018

== Grand Slam tournament finals ==
=== Singles: 4 (3 titles, 1 runner-up) ===
Result	Year	Tournament	Surface	Opponent	Score
Win	2022	Wimbledon	Grass	(Tunisia) Ons Jabeur	3–6, 6–2, 6–2
Loss	2023	Australian Open	Hard	Aryna Sabalenka	6–4, 3–6, 4–6
Win	2026	Australian Open	Hard	Aryna Sabalenka	6–4, 4–6, 6–4
Win	2026	US Open	Hard	Aryna Sabalenka	6–4, 5–7, 6–2

== Other significant finals ==
=== WTA 1000 tournaments ===
==== Singles: 7 (2 titles, 5 runner-ups) ====
Result	Year	Tournament	Surface	Opponent	Score
Win	2023	Indian Wells Open	Hard	Aryna Sabalenka	7–6^{(13–11)}, 6–4
Loss	2023	Miami Open	Hard	(Czech Republic) Petra Kvitová	6–7^{(14–16)}, 2–6
Win	2023	Italian Open	Clay	(Ukraine) Anhelina Kalinina	6–4, 1–0, ret.
Loss	2024	Qatar Open	Hard	(Poland) Iga Świątek	6–7^{(8–10)}, 2–6
Loss	2024	Miami Open	Hard	(United States) Danielle Collins	5–7, 3–6
Loss	2026	Indian Wells Open	Hard	Aryna Sabalenka	6–3, 3–6, 6–7^{(6–8)}
Loss	2026	Canadian Open	Hard	(Poland) Iga Świątek	2–6, 3–6

==== Doubles: 1 (runner-up) ====
Result	Year	Tournament	Surface	Partner	Opponents	Score
Loss	2021	Indian Wells Open	Hard	(Russia) Veronika Kudermetova	(Chinese Taipei) Hsieh Su-wei (Belgium) Elise Mertens	6–7^{(1–7)}, 3–6

=== Year-end championships (WTA Finals) ===
==== Singles: 1 (title) ====
Result	Year	Tournament	Surface	Opponent	Score
Win	2025	WTA Finals, Saudi Arabia	Hard (i)	Aryna Sabalenka	6–3, 7–6^{(7–0)}

=== Summer Olympics ===
==== Singles: 1 (4th place) ====
Result	Year	Tournament	Surface	Opponent	Score
4th place	2021	Tokyo Olympics	Hard	(Ukraine) Elina Svitolina	6–1, 6–7^{(5–7)}, 4–6

== WTA Tour finals ==
=== Singles: 28 (15 titles, 13 runner-ups) ===
Legend Grand Slam (3–1) WTA Finals (1–0) WTA 1000 (2–5) Premier / WTA 500 (7–3) International / WTA 250 (2–4)	Finals by surface Hard (9–12) Clay (5–1) Grass (1–0)	Finals by setting Outdoor (12–12) Indoor (3–1)

Result	W–L	Date	Tournament	Tier	Surface	Opponent	Score
Win	1–0	Jul 2019	Bucharest Open, Romania	International	Clay	(Romania) Patricia Maria Țig	6–2, 6–0
Loss	1–1	Sep 2019	Jiangxi International, China	International	Hard	(Sweden) Rebecca Peterson	2–6, 0–6
Loss	1–2	Jan 2020	Shenzhen Open, China	International	Hard	(Russia) Ekaterina Alexandrova	2–6, 4–6
Win	2–2	Jan 2020	Hobart International, Australia	International	Hard	(China) Zhang Shuai	7–6^{(9–7)}, 6–3
Loss	2–3	Feb 2020	St. Petersburg Trophy, Russia	Premier	Hard (i)	(Netherlands) Kiki Bertens	1–6, 3–6
Loss	2–4	Feb 2020	Dubai Championships, United Arab Emirates	Premier	Hard	(Romania) Simona Halep	6–3, 3–6, 6–7^{(5–7)}
Loss	2–5	Sep 2020	Internationaux de Strasbourg, France	International	Clay	(Ukraine) Elina Svitolina	4–6, 6–1, 2–6
Loss	2–6	Jan 2022	Adelaide International, Australia	WTA 500	Hard	(Australia) Ashleigh Barty	3–6, 2–6
Win	3–6	Jul 2022	Wimbledon, United Kingdom	Grand Slam	Grass	(Tunisia) Ons Jabeur	3–6, 6–2, 6–2
Loss	3–7	Sep 2022	Slovenia Open, Slovenia	WTA 250	Hard	(Czech Republic) Kateřina Siniaková	7–6^{(7–4)}, 6–7^{(5–7)}, 4–6
Loss	3–8	Jan 2023	Australian Open, Australia	Grand Slam	Hard	Aryna Sabalenka	6–4, 3–6, 4–6
Win	4–8	Mar 2023	Indian Wells Open, United States	WTA 1000	Hard	Aryna Sabalenka	7–6^{(13–11)}, 6–4
Loss	4–9	Apr 2023	Miami Open, United States	WTA 1000	Hard	(Czech Republic) Petra Kvitová	6–7^{(14–16)}, 2–6
Win	5–9	May 2023	Italian Open, Italy	WTA 1000	Clay	(Ukraine) Anhelina Kalinina	6–4, 1–0, ret.
Win	6–9	Jan 2024	Brisbane International, Australia	WTA 500	Hard	Aryna Sabalenka	6–0, 6–3
Win	7–9	Feb 2024	Abu Dhabi Open, United Arab Emirates	WTA 500	Hard	Daria Kasatkina	6–1, 6–4
Loss	7–10	Feb 2024	Qatar Open, Qatar	WTA 1000	Hard	(Poland) Iga Świątek	6–7^{(8–10)}, 2–6
Loss	7–11	Apr 2024	Miami Open, United States	WTA 1000	Hard	(United States) Danielle Collins	5–7, 3–6
Win	8–11	Apr 2024	Stuttgart Open, Germany	WTA 500	Clay (i)	(Ukraine) Marta Kostyuk	6–2, 6–2
Win	9–11	May 2025	Internationaux de Strasbourg, France	WTA 500	Clay	Liudmila Samsonova	6–1, 6–7^{(2–7)}, 6–1
Win	10–11	Oct 2025	Ningbo Open, China	WTA 500	Hard	Ekaterina Alexandrova	3–6, 6–0, 6–2
Win	11–11	Nov 2025	WTA Finals, Saudi Arabia	Finals	Hard (i)	Aryna Sabalenka	6–3, 7–6^{(7–0)}
Win	12–11	Jan 2026	Australian Open, Australia	Grand Slam	Hard	Aryna Sabalenka	6–4, 4–6, 6–4
Loss	12–12	Mar 2026	Indian Wells Open, United States	WTA 1000	Hard	Aryna Sabalenka	6–3, 3–6, 6–7^{(6–8)}
Win	13–12	Apr 2026	Stuttgart Open, Germany (2)	WTA 500	Clay (i)	(Czech Republic) Karolína Muchová	7–5, 6–1
Loss	13–13	Aug 2026	Canadian Open, Canada	WTA 1000	Hard	(Poland) Iga Świątek	2–6, 3–6
Win	14–13	Sep 2026	US Open, United States	Grand Slam	Hard	Aryna Sabalenka	6–4, 5–7, 6–2
Win	15–13	Oct 2026	Ningbo Open, China (2)	WTA 500	Hard	(Canada) Leylah Fernandez	6–2, 6–2

=== Doubles: 2 (2 runner-ups) ===
Legend WTA 1000 (0–1) WTA 500 (0–1)	Finals by surface Hard (0–2)	Finals by setting Outdoor (0–2)

Result	W–L	Date	Tournament	Tier	Surface	Partner	Opponents	Score
Loss	0–1	Oct 2021	Indian Wells Open, United States	WTA 1000	Hard	(Russia) Veronika Kudermetova	(Chinese Taipei) Hsieh Su-wei (Belgium) Elise Mertens	6–7^{(1–7)}, 3–6
Loss	0–2	Jan 2023	Adelaide International, Australia	WTA 500	Hard	Anastasia Pavlyuchenkova	(Brazil) Luisa Stefani (United States) Taylor Townsend	5–7, 6–7^{(3–7)}

== ITF Circuit finals ==
=== Singles: 9 (4 titles, 5 runner–ups) ===
Legend 60k tournaments (1–1) 25k tournaments (2–2) 10k / 15k tournaments (1–2)	Finals by surface Hard (4–4) Clay (0–1)

Result	W–L	Date	Tournament	Tier	Surface	Opponent	Score
Loss	0–1	Nov 2015	ITF Antalya, Turkey	10k	Clay	(Georgia (country)) Ekaterine Gorgodze	5–7, 7–6^{(7–3)}, 3–6
Loss	0–2	Nov 2016	ITF Helsinki, Finland	10k	Hard (i)	(Denmark) Karen Barritza	3–6, 4–6
Loss	0–3	Jun 2017	Fergana Challenger, Uzbekistan	25k	Hard	(Uzbekistan) Sabina Sharipova	4–6, 6–7^{(5–7)}
Win	1–3	Mar 2018	Kazan Open, Russia	15k	Hard (i)	(Russia) Daria Nazarkina	6–4, 7–6^{(7–5)}
Loss	1–4	Apr 2018	Lale Cup Istanbul, Turkey	60k	Hard	(Uzbekistan) Sabina Sharipova	6–7^{(0–7)}, 4–6
Loss	1–5	Jan 2019	Playford International, Australia	25,000	Hard	(Russia) Anna Kalinskaya	4–6, 4–6
Win	2–5	Feb 2019	Launceston International, Australia	60k	Hard	(Russia) Irina Khromacheva	7–5, 3–3 ret.
Win	3–5	Mar 2019	ITF Moscow, Russia	25k	Hard (i)	(Ukraine) Ganna Poznikhirenko	7–5, 6–0
Win	4–5	Mar 2019	Kazan Open, Russia	25k+H	Hard (i)	(Poland) Urszula Radwańska	6–2, 6–3

=== Doubles: 4 (4 titles) ===
Legend 25k tournaments (1–0) 15k tournaments (3–0)	Finals by surface Hard (3–0) Clay (1–0)

Result	W–L	Date	Tournament	Tier	Surface	Partner	Opponents	Score
Win	1–0	Apr 2017	ITF Istanbul, Turkey	15k	Hard (i)	(Russia) Ekaterina Kazionova	(Greece) Eleni Daniilidou (Israel) Vlada Ekshibarova	6–1, 6–3
Win	2–0	May 2017	ITF Antalya, Turkey	15k	Clay	(Russia) Amina Anshba	(Russia) Daria Nazarkina (Russia) Anna Ukolova	7–5, 4–6, [10–8]
Win	3–0	Mar 2018	Kazan Open, Russia	15k	Hard (i)	(Russia) Alena Fomina	(Russia) Anastasia Frolova (Russia) Ksenia Lykina	6–4, 1–6, [10–6]
Win	4–0	Mar 2019	ITF Moscow, Russia	25k	Hard (i)	(Russia) Sofya Lansere	(Ukraine) Ganna Poznikhirenko (Germany) Vivian Heisen	1–6, 6–3, [10–4]

== Billie Jean King Cup participation ==
Rybakina made her debut at the Fed Cup playing for Kazakhstan in 2021. Since then, she has a singles record of 10–2, and a doubles record of 0–2.

Legend	Meaning
F QR / Z RR / Z PO (9–3)	Finals qualifying round / Zone Group round robin / play-off

=== Singles: 12 (10 wins, 2 losses) ===
Edition	Stage	Date	Location	Surface	Against	Opponent	W/L	Score
2020–21	PO	Apr 2021	Córdoba, Argentina	Clay	Argentina	María Lourdes Carlé	L	4–6, 6–3, 0–6
2020–21	PO	Apr 2021	Córdoba, Argentina	Clay	Argentina	Nadia Podoroska	W	6–4, 6–4
2022	F QR	Apr 2022	Nur-Sultan, Kazakhstan	Clay(i)	Germany	Laura Siegemund	W	6–0, 6–1
2022	F QR	Apr 2022	Nur-Sultan, Kazakhstan	Clay(i)	Germany	Angelique Kerber	W	4–6, 6–3, 7–5
2022	F 1R	Nov 2022	Glasgow, United-Kingdom	Hard(i)	(United Kingdom) Great Britain	Harriet Dart	W	6–1, 6–4
2022	F 1R	Nov 2022	Glasgow, United-Kingdom	Hard(i)	Spain	Paula Badosa	L	2–6, 6–3, 4–6
2023	F QR	Apr 2023	Astana, Kazakhstan	Clay(i)	Poland	Weronika Falkowska	W	7–5, 6–3
2023	F QR	Apr 2023	Astana, Kazakhstan	Clay(i)	Poland	Magda Linette	W	6–4, 6–2
2024	PO	Nov 2024	Astana, Kazakhstan	Hard(i)	South Korea	Park So-hyun	W	6–2, 6–2
2025	F QR	Apr 2025	Brisbane, Australia	Hard	Australia	Kimberly Birrell	W	6–3, 7–6^{(7–4)}
2025	F QR	Apr 2025	Brisbane, Australia	Hard	Colombia	Yuliana Lizarazo	W	6–1, 6–2
2025	F QF	Sept 2025	Shenzhen, China	Hard(i)	(United States) USA	Jessica Pegula	W	6–4, 6–1

=== Doubles: 2 (0 wins, 2 losses) ===
Edition	Stage	Date	Location	Surface	Partner	Against	Opponents	W/L	Score
2022	F 1R	Nov 2022	Glasgow, United Kingdom	Hard(i)	Anna Danilina	(United Kingdom) Great Britain	Alicia Barnett; Olivia Nicholls	L	5–7, 3–6
2025	F QF	Sept 2025	Shenzhen, China	Hard(i)	Yulia Putintseva	(United States) USA	Jessica Pegula; Taylor Townsend	L	2–6, 6–7^{(1-7)}

== ITF Junior Circuit finals ==
=== Singles: 9 (6 titles, 3 runner-ups) ===
Legend
Grade A (1–0)
Grade 1 (2–1)
Grade 2 (1–2)
Grade 3 (2–0)

Result	W–L	Date	Tournament	Tier	Surface	Opponent	Score
Win	1–0	Mar 2014	ITF Almetievsk, Russia	Grade 3	Hard	(Russia) Sofiya Esterman	6–3, 6–2
Loss	1–1	Jun 2014	ITF Moscow, Russia	Grade 2	Clay	(Russia) Anna Blinkova	1–6, 2–6
Win	2–1	Nov 2014	ITF Novokuznetsk, Russia	Grade 3	Carpet	(Russia) Daria Kruzhkova	7–6^{(7–4)}, 6–3
Loss	2–2	Jan 2015	ITF Bratislava, Slovakia	Grade 2	Carpet	(Czech Republic) Markéta Vondroušová	4–6, 7–6^{(7–2)}, 1–6
Loss	2–3	May 2015	ITF Charleroi, Belgium	Grade 1	Clay	(Germany) Katharina Hobgarski	1–6, 6–4, 2–6
Win	3–3	Jul 2015	ITF Moscow, Russia	Grade 2	Clay	(Belarus) Nika Shytkouskaya	6–3, 6–0
Win	4–3	Feb 2016	ITF Kazan, Russia	Grade 1	Hard	(Russia) Valeriya Zeleva	6–2, 6–4
Win	5–3	Mar 2016	ITF Umag, Croatia	Grade 1	Clay	(Ukraine) Katarina Zavatska	6–2, 5–7, 7–6^{(7–5)}
Win	6–3	May 2017	Trofeo Bonfiglio, Italy	Grade A	Clay	(Poland) Iga Świątek	1–6, 7–6^{(7–5)}, 6–3

=== Doubles: 8 (3 titles, 5 runner-ups) ===
Legend
Grade A (0–1)
Grade 1 (1–1)
Grade 2 (1–1)
Grade 3 (1–1)
Grade 4 (0–1)

Result	W–L	Date	Tournament	Tier	Surface	Partner	Opponents	Score
Loss	0–1	May 2014	ITF Istanbul, Turkey	Grade 4	Hard	(Russia) Valeriya Yushchenko	(Turkey) Ayla Aksu (Turkey) Muge Topsel	1–6, 5–7
Win	1–1	Jun 2014	ITF Almaty, Kazakhstan	Grade 3	Clay	(Russia) Amina Anshba	(Russia) Elisabeth Lyukshinova (Russia) Anna Ureke	7–5, 7–6
Loss	1–2	Nov 2014	ITF Novokuznetsk, Russia	Grade 3	Carpet	(Russia) Valeriya Deminova	(Russia) Daria Kruzhkova (Russia) Tatiana Nikolaeva	3–6, 2–6
Loss	1–3	Feb 2015	ITF Siauliai, Lithuania	Grade 2	Hard	(Russia) Olesya Pervushina	(Netherlands) Nina Kruijer (Netherlands) Liza Lebedzeva	6–3, 3–6, [5–10]
Win	2–3	Jul 2015	ITF Moscow, Russia	Grade 2	Clay	(Russia) Maria Galiy	(Russia) Sofiya Esterman (Russia) Anastasia Gasanova	6–2, 1–6, [10–6]
Loss	2–4	May 2016	Trofeo Bonfiglio, Italy	Grade A	Clay	(Russia) Amina Anshba	(Russia) Olesya Pervushina (Russia) Anastasia Potapova	4–6, 1–6
Win	3–4	Sep 2016	ITF Repentigny, Canada	Grade 1	Hard	(Norway) Malene Helgø	(China) Wang Xiyu (China) Zheng Wushuang	7–6^{(8–6)}, 6–4
Loss	3–5	Apr 2017	ITF Beaulieu-sur-Mer, France	Grade 1	Clay	(United Kingdom) Emily Appleton	(United Kingdom) Ali Collins (Germany) Jule Niemeier	6–7^{(1–7)}, 3–6

Note: Tournaments sourced from official Junior ITF archives

== WTA Tour career earnings ==
Year	Grand Slam titles	WTA titles	Total titles	Earnings ($)	Money list rank
2015	–	–	–	221	2403
2016	–	–	–	2,712	991
2017	–	–	–	15,841	450
2018	–	–	–	64,386	263
2019	–	1	1	355,606	116
2020	–	1	1	1,022,234	13
2021	–	–	–	1,280,541	24
2022	1	–	1	3,613,440	4
2023	–	2	2	5,493,437	5
2024	–	3	3	3,876,915	8
2025	–	3	3	8,456,632	3
2026	2	2	4	11,134,420	1
Career	3	12	15	35,573,137	11

- Title counts include singles, doubles and mixed doubles titles.

With a 2025 total prize money of $5,250,000, she received the highest prize money in tennis history at that time, after winning the 2025 WTA Finals.

She received total prize money of 5,500,000, the largest ever in women's sporting history after winning the 2026 US Open.

== WTA ranking ==
Rybakina has a career highest ranking of 1 achieved on 14 September 2026.

=== General ===
Year	2018	2019	2020	2021	2022	2023	2024	2025	2026
High	182	36	17	14	12	3	3	5	1
Low	450	196	37	23	25	25	6	13	5
End	191	37	19	14	22	4	6	5	1

Weeks in top	Total weeks
at number 1	10*
top 2	36*
top 3	53*
top 5	134*
top 10	183*
top 20	279*
top 50	355*
top 100	363*

*as of 26 October 2026.

== Career Grand Slam statistics ==
=== Grand Slam tournament seedings ===
The tournaments won by Rybakina are in boldface, and advanced into finals by Rybakina are in italics.

Legend seeded No. 2 (**1** / 3) seeded No. 3 (0 / 2) seeded No. 4–10 (**1** / 7) seeded No. 11–32 (**1** / 14) unseeded (0 / 2)	Longest streak 3 1 4 12 1

Year	Australian Open	French Open	Wimbledon	US Open
2018	A	A	A	DNQ
2019	DNQ	–	DNQ	–
2020	29th	14th	cancelled	11th
2021	17th	21st	18th	19th
2022	12th	16th	**17th (1)**	25th
2023	22nd (1)	4th	3rd	4th
2024	3rd	4th	4th	4th
2025	6th	12th	11th	9th
2026	**5th (2)**	2nd	2nd	**2nd (3)**

- Key: (A) absent; (Q) qualifier; (DNQ) did not qualify; (RT) retired; (NH) Not Held; (–) unseeded; (LL) lucky looser; (PR) protect ranking.

=== Best Grand Slam results details ===
Tournament winners are in boldface, and runners-up are in italics.

Australian Open
2026 (5th)
Round	Opponent	Rank	Score
1R	(Slovenia) Kaja Juvan	100	6–4, 6–3
2R	(France) Varvara Gracheva	77	7–5, 6–2
3R	(Czech Republic) Tereza Valentova	54	6–2, 6–3
4R	(Belgium) Elise Mertens (21)	21	6–1, 6–3
QF	(Poland) Iga Swiatek (2)	2	7–5, 6–1
SF	(United States) Jessica Pegula (6)	6	6–3, 7–6^{(9–7)}
**W**	Aryna Sabalenka (1)	**1**	6–4, 4–6, 6–4

Wimbledon Championships
2022 (17th)
Round	Opponent	Rank	Score
1R	(United States) CoCo Vandeweghe (LL)	157	7–6^{(7–2)}, 7–5
2R	(Canada) Bianca Andreescu	56	6–4, 7–6^{(7–5)}
3R	(China) Zheng Qinwen	52	7–6^{(7–4)}, 7–5
4R	(Croatia) Petra Martić	80	7–5, 6–3
QF	(Australia) Ajla Tomljanović	44	4–6, 6–2, 6–3
SF	(Romania) Simona Halep (16)	18	6–3, 6–3
**W**	(Tunisia) Ons Jabeur (3)	2	3–6, 6–2, 6–2

French Open
2021 (21st)
Round	Opponent	Rank	Score
1R	(France) Elsa Jacquemot (WC)	492	6–4, 6–1
2R	(Japan) Nao Hibino	82	6–3, 6–1
3R	(Russia) Elena Vesnina (PR)	1096	6–1, 6–4
4R	(United States) Serena Williams (7)	8	6–3, 7–5
QF	(Russia) Anastasia Pavlyuchenkova (31)	32	7–6^{(7–2)}, 2–6, 7–9
2024 (4th)
Round	Opponent	Rank	Score
1R	(Belgium) Greet Minnen	85	6–2, 6–3
2R	(Netherlands) Arantxa Rus	50	6–3, 6–4
3R	(Belgium) Elise Mertens (25)	27	6–4, 6–2
4R	(Ukraine) Elina Svitolina (15)	19	6–4, 6–3
QF	(Italy) Jasmine Paolini (12)	15	2–6, 6–4, 4–6

US Open
2026 (2nd)
Round	Opponent	Rank	Score
1R	(United States) Thea Frodin (WC)	585	6–3, 6–2
2R	(Spain) Jéssica Bouzas Maneiro	105	6–2, 6–4
3R	(Ukraine) Yulia Starodubtseva	58	7–6^{(8–6)}, 6–3
4R	(Japan) Naomi Osaka (13)	13	6–1, 6–4
QF	(China) Zheng Qinwen (Q)	121	3–6, 6–1, 6–4
SF	(United States) Coco Gauff (4)	4	3–6, 6–4, 6–4
**W**	Aryna Sabalenka (1)	**1**	6–4, 5–7, 6–2

== Wins against top 10 players ==
- Rybakina has an 41–32 (56%) record against players who were, at the time the match was played, ranked in the top 10.
- She has the record of record of 10-8 (56%) against over world No.1's in WTA.

Season	2018	2019	2020	2021	2022	2023	2024	2025	2026	Total
Wins	1	1	2	3	2	7	4	11	10	41

No.	Opponent	Rk	Event	Surface	Rd	Score	Rk	Years	Ref
1	(France) Caroline Garcia	7	St. Petersburg Trophy, Russia	Hard (i)	2R	4–6, 7–6^{(8–6)}, 7–6^{(7–5)}	450	2018	
2	(Romania) Simona Halep	6	Wuhan Open, China	Hard	3R	5–4, ret.	50	2019	
3	(United States) Sofia Kenin	7	Dubai Championships, UAE	Hard	1R	6–7^{(2–7)}, 6–3, 6–3	19	2020	
4	(Czech Republic) Karolína Plíšková	3	Dubai Championships, UAE	Hard	QF	7–6^{(7–1)}, 6–3	19	2020	
5	(United States) Serena Williams	8	French Open, France	Clay	4R	6–3, 7–5	22	2021	
6	(Ukraine) Elina Svitolina	5	Eastbourne International, UK	Grass	2R	6–4, 7–6^{(7–3)}	21	2021	
7	(Spain) Garbiñe Muguruza	9	Tokyo Olympics, Japan	Hard	QF	7–5, 6–1	20	2021	
8	(Tunisia) Ons Jabeur	2	Wimbledon, United Kingdom	Grass	F	3–6, 6–2, 6–2	23	2022	
9	(Spain) Garbiñe Muguruza	9	Cincinnati Open, US	Hard	2R	6–3, 6–1	25	2022	
10	(Poland) Iga Świątek	1	Australian Open, Australia	Hard	4R	6–4, 6–4	25	2023	
11	(Poland) Iga Świątek	1	Indian Wells Open, US	Hard	SF	6–2, 6–2	10	2023	
12	Aryna Sabalenka	2	Indian Wells Open, US	Hard	F	7–6^{(13–11)}, 6–4	10	2023	
13	(United States) Jessica Pegula	3	Miami Open, US	Hard	SF	6–3, 7–6^{(7–4)}	7	2023	
14	(Poland) Iga Świątek	1	Italian Open, Italy	Clay	QF	2–6, 7–6^{(7–3)}, 2–2, ret.	6	2023	
15	Aryna Sabalenka	1	China Open, China	Hard	QF	7–5, 6–2	5	2023	
16	(Greece) Maria Sakkari	9	WTA Finals, Mexico	Hard	RR	6–0, 6–7^{(4–7)}, 7–6^{(7–2)}	4	2023	
17	Aryna Sabalenka	2	Brisbane International, Australia	Hard	F	6–0, 6–3	4	2024	
18	(Greece) Maria Sakkari	9	Miami Open, US	Hard	QF	7–5, 6–7^{(4–7)}, 6–4	4	2024	
19	(Poland) Iga Świątek	1	Stuttgart Open, Germany	Clay (i)	SF	6–3, 4–6, 6–3	4	2024	
20	Aryna Sabalenka	1	WTA Finals, Saudi Arabia	Hard (i)	RR	6–4, 3–6, 6–1	5	2024	
21	(Spain) Paula Badosa	10	Dubai Tennis Championships, UAE	Hard	3R	4–6, 7–6^{(10–8)}, 7–6^{(7–2)}	7	2025	
22	(United States) Madison Keys	6	Cincinnati Open, US	Hard	4R	6–7^{(3–7)}, 6–4, 6–2	10	2025	
23	Aryna Sabalenka	1	Cincinnati Open, US	Hard	QF	6–1, 6–4	10	2025	
24	(United States) Jessica Pegula	7	BJK Cup, China	Hard (i)	QF	6–4, 6–1	10	2025	
25	(Italy) Jasmine Paolini	8	Ningbo Open, China	Hard	SF	6–3, 6–2	9	2025	
26	Ekaterina Alexandrova	10	Ningbo Open, China	Hard	F	3–6, 6–0, 6–2	9	2025	
27	(United States) Amanda Anisimova	4	WTA Finals, Saudi Arabia	Hard (i)	RR	6–3, 6–1	6	2025	
28	(Poland) Iga Świątek	2	WTA Finals, Saudi Arabia	Hard (i)	RR	3–6, 6–1, 6–0	6	2025	
29	Ekaterina Alexandrova	10	WTA Finals, Saudi Arabia	Hard (i)	RR	6–4, 6–4	6	2025	
30	(United States) Jessica Pegula	5	WTA Finals, Saudi Arabia	Hard (i)	SF	4–6, 6–4, 6–3	6	2025	
31	Aryna Sabalenka	1	WTA Finals, Saudi Arabia	Hard (i)	F	6–3, 7–6^{(7–0)}	6	2025	
32	(Poland) Iga Świątek	2	Australian Open, Australia	Hard	QF	7–5, 6–1	5	2026	
33	(United States) Jessica Pegula	6	Australian Open, Australia	Hard	SF	6–3, 7–6^{(9–7)}	5	2026	
34	Aryna Sabalenka	1	Australian Open, Australia	Hard	F	6–4, 4–6, 6–4	5	2026	
35	(United States) Jessica Pegula	5	Indian Wells Open, United States	Hard	QF	6–1, 7–6^{(7–4)}	3	2026	
36	(Ukraine) Elina Svitolina	9	Indian Wells Open, United States	Hard	SF	7–5, 6–4	3	2026	
37	(United States) Jessica Pegula	5	Miami Open, United States	Hard	QF	2–6, 6–3, 6–4	2	2026	
38	Mirra Andreeva	9	Stuttgart Open, Germany	Clay (i)	SF	7–5, 6–1	2	2026	
39	(United States) Coco Gauff	4	Canada Open, Canada	Hard	SF	5–7, 6–2, 6–2	2	2026	
40	(United States) Coco Gauff	4	US Open, United States	Hard	SF	3–6, 6–4, 6–4	2	2026	
41	Aryna Sabalenka	1	US Open, United States	Hard	F	6–4, 5–7, 6–2	2	2026	

- Key: (Rk) first use, opponent rank; (Rd) round; (Rk) 2nd use, player rank; (Ref) reference; (F) final; (SF) semifinal; (QF) quarterfinal; (#R) rounds 4, 3, 2, 1; (RR) round-robin stage; (Q#) qualifying rounds or stages (3), 2, 1.
- Additional top 10 sources

== Longest winning streaks ==
=== 13-match winning streak (2023) ===
#	Tournament	Tier	Start date	Surface	Rd	Opponent	Rk	Score
–	Abu Dhabi Open	WTA 500	6 February 2023	Hard	QF	(Brazil) Beatriz Haddad Maia (6)	14	6–3, 3–6, 2–6
1	Dubai Tennis Championships	WTA 1000	20 February 2023	Hard	1R	(Canada) Bianca Andreescu	36	6–3, 6–4
2	Dubai Tennis Championships	WTA 1000	20 February 2023	Hard	2R	(Czech Republic) Marie Bouzková	26	7–5, 6–2
–	Dubai Tennis Championships	WTA 1000	20 February 2023	Hard	3R	(United States) Coco Gauff (5)	6	w/o
–	Indian Wells Open	WTA 1000	6 March 2023	Hard	1R	Bye		
3	Indian Wells Open	WTA 1000	6 March 2023	Hard	2R	(United States) Sofia Kenin (WC)	170	7–6^{(8–6)}, 7–6^{(7–5)}
4	Indian Wells Open	WTA 1000	6 March 2023	Hard	3R	(Spain) Paula Badosa (21)	22	6–3, 7–5
5	Indian Wells Open	WTA 1000	6 March 2023	Hard	4R	Varvara Gracheva (Q)	66	6–3, 6–0
6	Indian Wells Open	WTA 1000	6 March 2023	Hard	QF	(Czech Republic) Karolína Muchová	76	7–6^{(7–4)}, 2–6, 6–4
7	Indian Wells Open	WTA 1000	6 March 2023	Hard	SF	(Poland) Iga Świątek (1)	1	6–2, 6–2
8	Indian Wells Open	WTA 1000	6 March 2023	Hard	W	Aryna Sabalenka (2)	2	7–6^{(13–11)}, 6–4
–	Miami Open	WTA 1000	20 March 2023	Hard	1R	Bye		
9	Miami Open	WTA 1000	20 March 2023	Hard	2R	Anna Kalinskaya	64	7–5, 4–6, 6–3
10	Miami Open	WTA 1000	20 March 2023	Hard	3R	(Spain) Paula Badosa (21)	29	3–6, 7–5, 6–3
11	Miami Open	WTA 1000	20 March 2023	Hard	4R	(Belgium) Elise Mertens	39	6–4, 6–3
12	Miami Open	WTA 1000	20 March 2023	Hard	QF	(Italy) Martina Trevisan (25)	24	6–3, 6–0
13	Miami Open	WTA 1000	20 March 2023	Hard	SF	(United States) Jessica Pegula (3)	3	7–6^{(7–3)}, 6–4
-	Miami Open	WTA 1000	20 March 2023	Hard	F	(Czech Republic) Petra Kvitová (15)	12	6–7^{(14–16)}, 2–6

=== 13-match win streak (2025–26) ===
#	Tournament	Tier	Start date	Surface	Rd	Opponent	Rk	Score
–	Wuhan Open	WTA 1000	6 October 2025	Hard	QF	Aryna Sabalenka (1)	1	3–6, 3–6
–	Ningbo Open	WTA 500	13 October 2025	Hard	1R	Bye		
1	Ningbo Open	WTA 500	13 October 2025	Hard	2R	(Ukraine) Dayana Yastremska	30	6–4, 6–7^{(6–8)}, 6–3
2	Ningbo Open	WTA 500	13 October 2025	Hard	QF	(Australia) Alja Tomljanovic (Q)	104	6–2, 6–0
3	Ningbo Open	WTA 500	13 October 2025	Hard	SF	(Italy) Jasmine Paolini (2)	8	6–3, 6–2
4	Ningbo Open	WTA 500	13 October 2025	Hard	W	Ekaterina Alexandrova (4)	10	3–6, 6–0, 6–2
–	Toray Pan Pacific Open	WTA 500	20 October 2025	Hard	1R	Bye		
5	Toray Pan Pacific Open	WTA 500	20 October 2025	Hard	2R	(Canada) Leylah Fernandez	22	6–4, 6–3
6	Toray Pan Pacific Open	WTA 500	20 October 2025	Hard	QF	(Canada) Victoria Mboko (9)	23	6–3, 7–6^{(7–4)}
–	Toray Pan Pacific Open	WTA 500	20 October 2025	Hard	SF	(Czech Republic) Linda Nosková (6)	17	Walkover
7	WTA Finals	Year-end championships	1 November 2025	Hard (i)	RR	(United States) Amanda Anisimova (4)	4	6–3, 6–1
8	WTA Finals	Year-end championships	1 November 2025	Hard (i)	RR	(Poland) Iga Świątek (2)	2	3–6, 6–1, 6–0
9	WTA Finals	Year-end championships	1 November 2025	Hard (i)	RR	Ekaterina Alexandrova (10)	10	6–4, 6–4
10	WTA Finals	Year-end championships	1 November 2025	Hard (i)	SF	(United States) Jessica Pegula (5)	5	4–6, 6–4, 6–3
11	WTA Finals	Year-end championships	1 November 2025	Hard (i)	W	Aryna Sabalenka (1)	1	6–3, 7–6^{(7–0)}
–	Brisbane International	WTA 500	4 January 2026	Hard	1R	Bye		
12	Brisbane International	WTA 500	4 January 2026	Hard	2R	(China) Zhang Shuai(Q)	102	6–3, 7–5
13	Brisbane International	WTA 500	4 January 2026	Hard	3R	(Spain) Paula Badosa (15)	25	6–3, 6–2
-	Brisbane International	WTA 500	4 January 2026	Hard	QF	(Czech Republic) Karolina Muchová (11)	19	2–6, 6–2, 4–6

== Exhibition matches ==
=== Singles ===
Result	Date	Tournament	Surface	Opponent	Score
Loss	Dec 2025	World Tennis Continental Cup, Shenzhen, China	Hard (i)	(Poland) Iga Świątek	3–6, 3–6
Win	Dec 2025	World Tennis Continental Cup, Shenzhen, China	Hard (i)	(Switzerland) Belinda Bencic	6–3, 6–4

=== Mixed doubles ===
Result	Date	Tournament	Surface	Partner	Opponents	Score
Win	Dec 2025	World Tennis Continental Cup, Shenzhen, China	Hard (i)	Andrey Rublev	(Monaco) Valentin Vacherot (Poland) Iga Świątek	6–4, 6–4

=== Team competitions ===
Result	Date	Tournament	Surface	Team	Partner(s)	Opp. team	Opponents	Score
Win	Dec 2022	World Tennis League, Dubai, United Arab Emirates	Hard	Team Hawks	Dominic Thiem; Alexander Zverev; Anastasia Pavlyuchenkova	Team Kites	Holger Rune; Félix Auger-Aliassime; Sania Mirza; Iga Świątek	32–25
Win	Dec 2025	World Tennis Continental Cup, Shenzhen, China	Hard (i)	World Team	Andrey Rublev; Zhang Zhizhen; Wang Xinyu	Europe Team	Flavio Cobolli; Valentin Vacherot; Belinda Bencic; Iga Świątek	15–7
