= Rybakina–Sabalenka rivalry =

Women's Tennis Rivalry in 2019/20s

Rybakina–Sabalenka rivalry

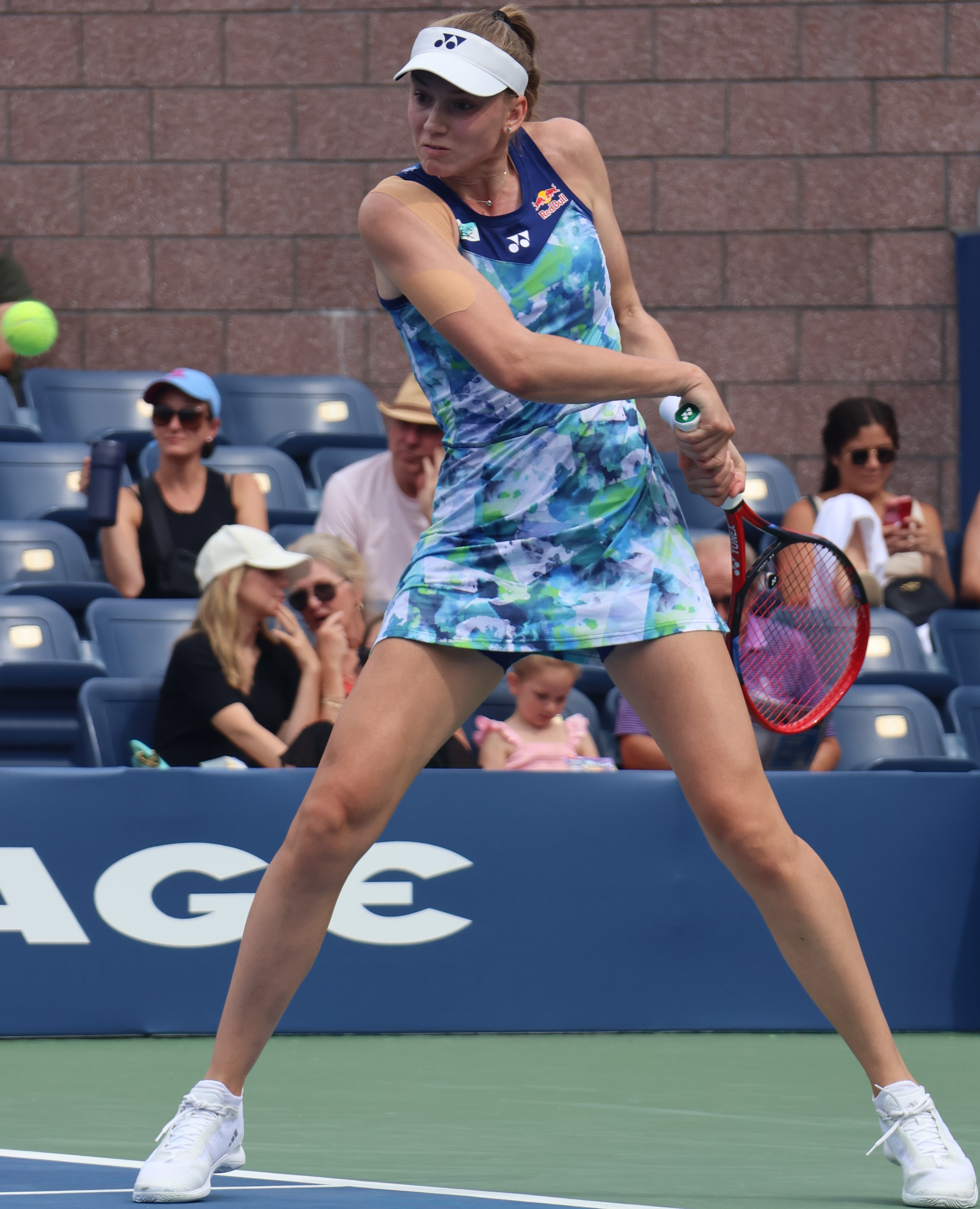
Elena Rybakina

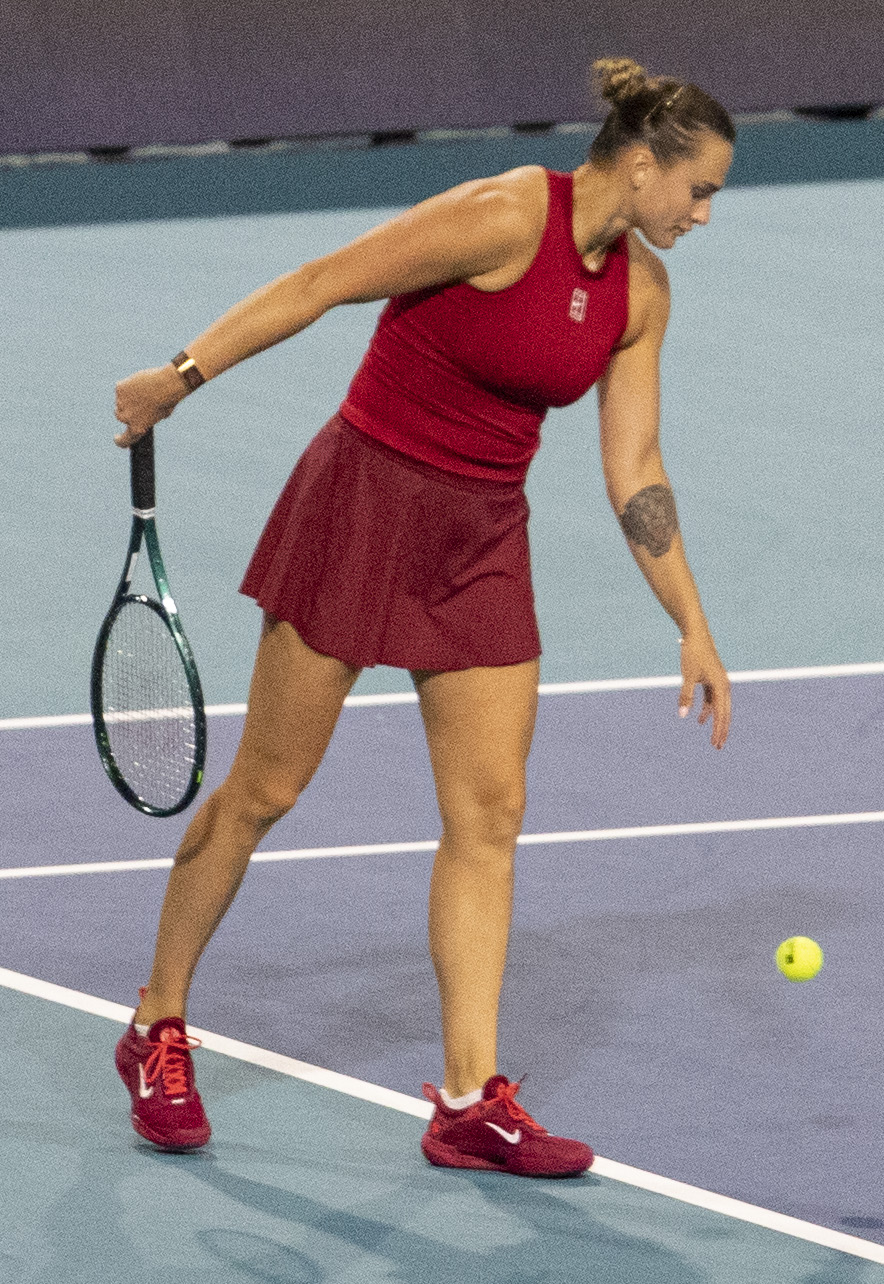
Aryna Sabalenka

The Rybakina–Sabalenka rivalry is a tennis rivalry between Elena Rybakina and Aryna Sabalenka, who have competed in 18 matches between 2019 and 2026, including three major finals.

The rivalry is defined by aggressive, high-powered baseline tennis, with both players relying on big serves and flat, penetrating groundstrokes to dominate rallies. It has evolved into one of the most evenly contested matchups on the WTA Tour, with Sabalenka leading 10–8. Rybakina leads in finals with 5–2 in tour finals, and 2–1 in major finals.

Their matches are closely contested, often going to a decisive third set. The rivalry is considered one of the best of its time. They have played multiple matches regarded as best of the era, including their 2023 Australian Open and 2026 Indian Wells Open finals, both won by Sabalenka, and the finals of the 2026 Australian Open and 2025 WTA Finals, both won by Rybakina.

Both players have held the world No. 1 ranking. Sabalenka held the distinction for a combined 107 weeks between 2023 and 2026. Rybakina usurped the position after defeating Sabalenka in the final at the 2026 US Open, earning 10 weeks atop the rankings as of November 17, 2026. They were ranked as the top two players in the world from March 2026 to November 2026.

== History ==
=== 2019 ===
Rybakina and Sabalenka played their first match in September 2019 at the Wuhan Open quarterfinals. Rybakina entered the tournament as a wild card and battled Sabalenka for three sets before Sabalenka came out on top en route to winning her second Wuhan title.

=== 2021 ===
Rybakina and Sabalenka played each other twice in 2021, with Sabalenka winning both meetings.

Sabalenka won their first meeting of the year in the Abu Dhabi quarterfinals, defeating Rybakina in three sets on her way to winning the title.

The two met in the Wimbledon round of 16, with Sabalenka overcoming Rybakina in three sets to reach her first Grand Slam quarterfinal. This was the pair's first Grand Slam meeting.

=== 2023 ===
Rybakina and Sabalenka met four times in 2023, with both players winning two matches each.

Rybakina and Sabalenka's first meeting of the year came in the final of the Australian Open in which Sabalenka came from a set down to win the match 4–6, 6–3, 6–4. This was Sabalenka's first major title.

They met again at the Indian Wells where Rybakina prevailed 7–6(11), 6–4 winning her first WTA 1000 tournament in her career. This was also Rybakina's first victory over Sabalenka in five matches.

Rybakina earned her second win later that year in China, dispatching the top seeded Sabalenka in straight sets in the quarterfinals.

They had their final meeting of the year in the WTA Finals, and despite a 15-minute rain delay along with 15 double faults, Sabalenka fought her way past Rybakina in three sets to advance to the semifinals. They would close the year with their head-to-head record at 5–2 in Sabalenka's favor.

=== 2024 ===
Rybakina and Sabaleka played three times in 2024, with Rybakina winning two of them, closing the gap in their head-to-head at 6–4 for Sabalenka.

Their first match was the final in Brisbane where Rybakina won easily 6–0, 6–3.

They had another notable encounter in Madrid that Sabalenka won in three sets despite being down a set and a break.

The two played their final match of the year at the WTA Finals once again, however this time it was Rybakina who came through in three sets. With this win, Rybakina became the first player representing an Asian country to defeat a world number 1 in the WTA Finals.

=== 2025 ===
Rybakina and Sabalenka met each other four times in 2025, both winning two matches each.

Their first meeting of the year came in the Berlin quarterfinals. After splitting the first two sets, Rybakina held four match points at 6–2 in the third set tiebreaker, before Sabalenka fought back to win 7–6(6), 3–6, 7–6(6) in 2 hours and 42 minutes. This would become their longest match so far.

The two met again on the hard courts of Cincinnati, where Sabalenka was the defending champion. However, Rybakina routinely defeated her in the quarterfinals in straight sets 6–1, 6–4.

Sabalenka returned the favor at the Wuhan quarterfinals, dispatching Rybakina in straight sets 6–3, 6–3.

Their most significant meet-up of the year was at the WTA Finals which Rybakina won by 6–3, 7–6(0) to secure her first WTA finals title. This win brought their head-to-head to 8–6 with Sabalenka holding her lead.

=== 2026 ===
Rybakina and Sabalenka have met four times in 2026 (twice in major finals), with both winning two matches. Their rivalry peaked during this year especially on hard courts where they contested two major finals, and met in the final of another WTA 1000.

Their first meeting of the year was at the Australian Open final, a rematch of their 2023 final won by Sabalenka. This was the first time since 2008 Wimbledon that both finalists reached the final without losing any set. In the final, Rybakina broke Sabalenka to win the first set before Sabalenka came back to win the second set. Carrying the momentum into third set Sabalenka took a 3–0 lead in third set. However Rybakina broke her twice to get into a 4–3 lead. Rybakina then sealed the match with an ace. This was Rybakina's second major title.

They met again at the Indian Wells Open final, a rematch of their Indian Wells Open won by Rybakina. Rybakina started the match breaking Sabalenka in sixth game and took the first set. She started the second set breaking Sabalenka again. However, Sabalenka then earned two consecutive breaks to close the set. In the third set, Sabalenka started with an early break to lead 1–0, then after eight consecutive holds of the serve, the score became 5–4. However, Rybakina broke Sabalenka while she was serving for the match, leveling the score 5–5 before eventually heading towards a tiebreaker. The tiebreak was competitive for the majority of the time, with Rybakina serving for the match at 6–5, but Sabalenka hit a crosscourt backhand winner to tie up the match once again. Sabalenka then earned two back-to-back points on her serve to win the match, winning her first Indian Wells title in her third final appearance. After the tournament they were ranked No.1 and No.2 in the WTA rankings.

They met again in the semifinals of Miami Open where Sabalenka defeated Rybakina 6–4, 6–3 en route to winning the Sunshine Double.

Starting from French Open, Rybakina was in contention to overtake Sabalenka from World no. 1. However she has early exits in both the French Open and Wimbledon and also retired in the quarterfinal of Cincinnati Open thus failing to overtake her. Finally, at the US Open, she reached the semifinals and ended Sabalenka's streak of being world no.1 at 99 consecutive weeks.

They met for the fourth time in the year in the final of US Open. Sabalenka and Rybakina also became the first pair of women's singles players to contest both hardcourt major finals in the same year since Steffi Graf and Arantxa Sánchez Vicario in 1994. This was also the first US Open final contested by the top two seeds since 2013. They were also the first pair since Serena Williams and Angelique Kerber in 2016 to compete in multiple major finals in a year. Rybakina broke in the fifth game to take the lead, eventually winning the first set. In the second set, Sabalenka broke Rybakina in the last game of the set to win it 7–5. Rybakina broke Sabalenka to take early 2–1 lead in final set which she consolidated with another break to make it 5–2. Rybakina double faulted on her first match point but served an ace on her second to win the title. She ended Sabalenka's 19-match US Open winning streak to win the third major title of her career and her first US Open title, becoming the third player in 21st century after Angelique Kerber and Sabalenka to win both Australian Open and US Open in the same year.

== Head-to-head matches ==
Record by tier
Legend	Rybakina	Sabalenka
Grand Slam	2	2
WTA Finals	2	1
WTA 1000	3	5
WTA 500	1	2
WTA 250	0	0
Total	8	10

Record by surface
Surface	Rybakina	Sabalenka
Hard	8	7
Grass	0	2
Clay	0	1
Total	8	10

=== Singles (18) ===
Rybakina 8 – Sabalenka 10

No.	Year	Tournament	Tier	Surface	Round	Winner	Score	Length	Sets	Rybakina	Sabalenka
1	2019	Wuhan Open	WTA Premier 5	Hard	Quarterfinals	Sabalenka	6–3, 1–6, 6–3	1:41	1–2	0	1
2	2021	Abu Dhabi Women's Tennis Open	WTA 500	Hard	Quarterfinals	Sabalenka	6–4, 4–6, 6–3	1:58	2–4	0	2
3	2021	Wimbledon Championships	Grand Slam	Grass	Round of 16	Sabalenka	6–3, 4–6, 6–3	1:49	3–6	0	3
4	2023	Australian Open	Grand Slam	Hard	Final	Sabalenka	4–6, 6–3, 6–4	2:28	4–8	0	4
5	2023	Indian Wells Open	WTA 1000	Hard	Final	Rybakina	7–6^{(13–11)}, 6–4	2:03	6–8	1	4
6	2023	China Open	WTA 1000	Hard	Quarterfinals	Rybakina	7–5, 6–2	1:34	8–8	2	4
7	2023	WTA Finals	WTA Finals	Hard	Round Robin	Sabalenka	6–2, 3–6, 6–3	2:27	9–10	2	5
8	2024	Brisbane International	WTA 500	Hard	Final	Rybakina	6–0, 6–3	1:13	11–10	3	5
9	2024	Madrid Open	WTA 1000	Clay	Semifinals	Sabalenka	1–6, 7–5, 7–6^{(7–5)}	2:17	12–12	3	6
10	2024	WTA Finals	WTA Finals	Hard (i)	Round Robin	Rybakina	6–4, 3–6, 6–1	1:41	14–13	4	6
11	2025	German Open	WTA 500	Grass	Quarterfinals	Sabalenka	7–6^{(8–6)}, 3–6, 7–6^{(8–6)}	2:42	15–15	4	7
12	2025	Cincinnati Open	WTA 1000	Hard	Quarterfinals	Rybakina	6–1, 6–4	1:15	17–15	5	7
13	2025	Wuhan Open	WTA 1000	Hard	Quarterfinals	Sabalenka	6–3, 6–3	1:25	17–17	5	8
14	2025	WTA Finals	WTA Finals	Hard (i)	Final	Rybakina	6–3, 7–6^{(7–0)}	1:48	19–17	6	8
15	2026	Australian Open	Grand Slam	Hard	Final	Rybakina	6–4, 4–6, 6–4	2:18	21–18	7	8
16	2026	Indian Wells Open	WTA 1000	Hard	Final	Sabalenka	3–6, 6–3, 7–6^{(8–6)}	2:31	22–20	7	9
17	2026	Miami Open	WTA 1000	Hard	Semifinals	Sabalenka	6–4, 6–3	1:19	22–22	7	10
18	2026	US Open	Grand Slam	Hard	Final	Rybakina	6–4, 5–7, 6–2	2:21	24–23	8	10

== Performance timeline ==
=== Titles Comparison ===
Titles by tier
Legend	Rybakina	Sabalenka
Grand Slam	3	4
WTA Finals	1	0
WTA Elite Trophy	0	1
WTA 1000	2	11
WTA 500	7	6
WTA 250	2	2
Total	15	24

Titles by surface
Surface	Rybakina	Sabalenka
Hard	9	21
Clay	5	3
Grass	1	0
Total	15	24

Titles by setting
Surface	Rybakina	Sabalenka
Outdoor	12	21
Indoor	3	3
Total	15	24

Key
W	F	SF	QF	#R	RR	Q#	DNQ	A	NH

(W) winner; (F) finalist; (SF) semifinalist; (QF) quarterfinalist; (#R) rounds 4, 3, 2, 1; (RR) round-robin stage; (Q#) qualification round; (DNQ) did not qualify; (A) absent; (NH) not held; (SR) strike rate (events won / competed); (W–L) win–loss record.
To avoid confusion and double counting, these charts are updated at the conclusion of a tournament or when the player's participation has ended.

=== Combined singles performance timeline (best result) ===
Tournament	2017	2018	2019	2020	2021	2022	2023	2024	2025	2026	SR
Grand Slam tournaments
Australian Open	Q2^{S}	1R^{S}	3R^{S}	3R^{R}	4R^{S}	4R^{S}	W^{S}	W^{S}	F^{S}	W^{R}	3 / 9
French Open	Q1^{S}	1R^{S}	2R^{S}	3R^{S}	QF^{R}	3R^{†}	SF^{S}	QF^{†}	F^{S}	QF^{S}	0 / 9
Wimbledon	2R^{S}	1R^{S}	1R^{S}	NH	SF^{S}	W^{R}	SF^{S}	SF^{R}	SF^{S}	4R^{S}	1 / 9
US Open	Q1^{S}	4R^{S}	2R^{S}	2R^{†}	SF^{S}	SF^{S}	F^{S}	W^{S}	W^{S}	W^{R}	3 / 9

^{†} both have the same result

==== Completed set tallies ====
Rybakina	Set score	Sabalenka
2	7–6	4
1	7–5	2
9	6–4	4
5	6–3	12
2	6–2	1
4	6–1	0
1	6–0	0
24	Total sets	23
51.1%	Total sets	48.9%
235	Total games	220
51.6%	Total games	48.4%
1,501	Total Points	1,457
50.7%	Total Points	49.3%

== WTA Rankings ==
=== Year-end ranking timeline ===
Player	2017	2018	2019	2020	2021	2022	2023	2024	2025	2026
(Kazakhstan) Elena Rybakina	425	191	37	19	14	22	4	6	5	1
(Belarus) Aryna Sabalenka	78	11	11	10	2	5	2	1	1	3

== See also ==
- List of tennis rivalries
- Elena Rybakina career statistics
- Aryna Sabalenka career statistics
