= 2025 Elena Rybakina tennis season =

Tennis season statistics

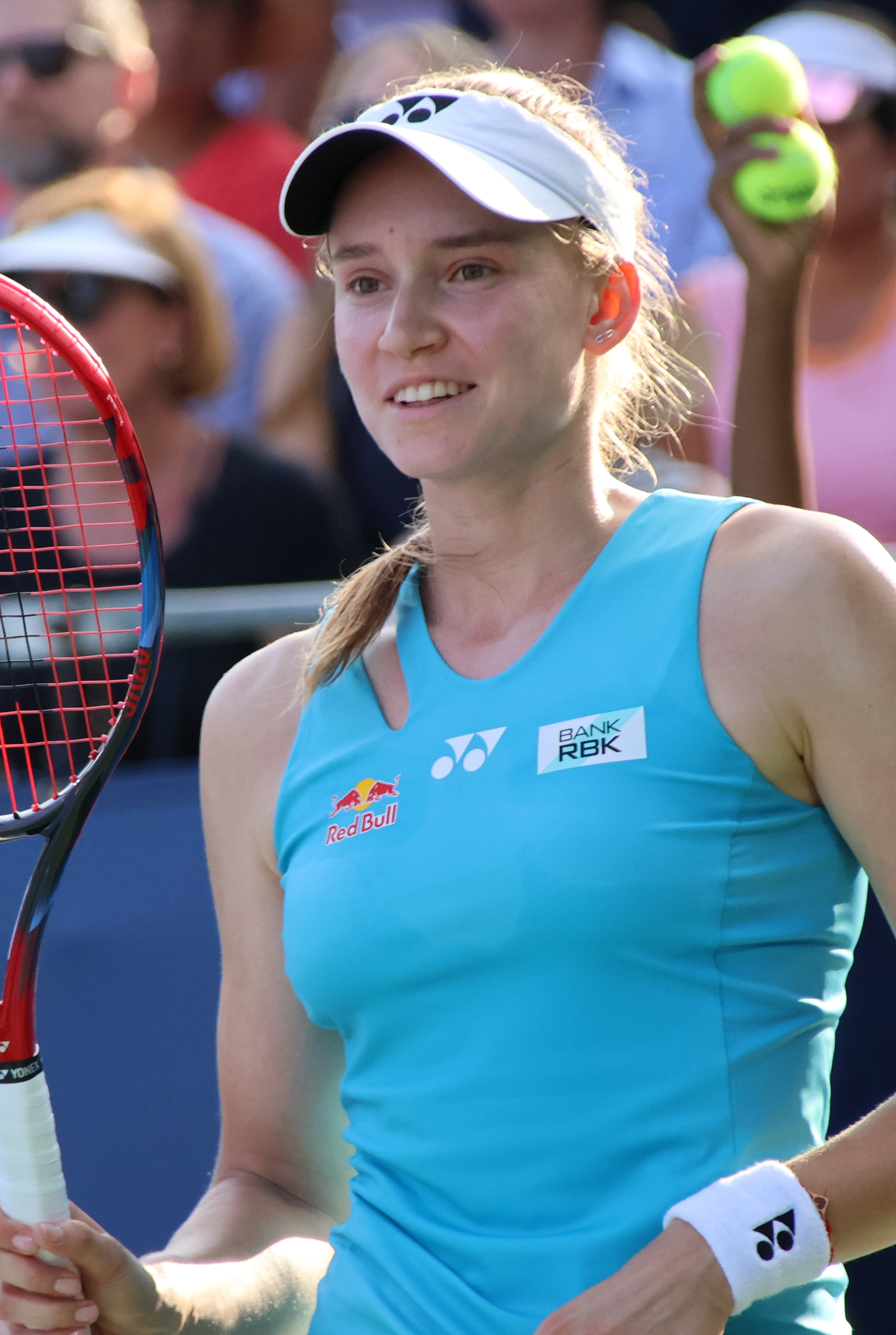
- Rybakina at the 2025 DC Open
- Full name: Elena Rybakina
- Country: Kazakhstan
- Calendar prize money: $8,456,632

Singles
- Season record: 58–19 (75%)
- Calendar titles: 3
- Current ranking: No. 5
- Year-end ranking: No. 5
- Ranking change from previous year: ▲1

Grand Slam & significant results
- Australian Open: 4R
- French Open: 4R
- Wimbledon: 3R
- US Open: 4R
- Championships: W

Doubles
- Season record: 3–2 (60%)
- Current ranking: 268
- Last updated on: 21 December 2025.

The 2025 Elena Rybakina tennis season officially began on 27 December 2024, with the start of the United Cup in Perth & Sydney, and concluded on 8 November 2025 with a victory in the championship match of the WTA Finals.

During this season, Rybakina:

- won WTA Finals, becoming the first Asian singles player, male or female to do so.
- landed $5.235 million after winning WTA finals undefeated, the biggest prize money payout in women's sporting history.
- also won two WTA 500 titles at Internationaux de Strasbourg and Ningbo Open.
- became the second player in WTA history to hit 500 aces in a single season after Karolína Plíšková, she was the ace leader of the year for second time in her career.
- finished the year in top 5 for second time in her career.
- reached six singles semifinals in the season, including three at WTA 1000 level.
- finished the 3rd seccessive year with a 75%+ winning record.

== Yearly summary ==
Rybakina began her season at the 2025 United Cup, reaching the semi-finals with team Kazakhstan. She then played in the Australian Open, before losing to eventual champion Madison Keys in the fourth round. Rybakina then played at the 2025 Abu Dhabi Open, where she was defeated in the Semi Finals by Belinda Bencic. At the 2025 Dubai Tennis Championships, Rybakina saved 6 match points en route to defeating world No. 10, Paula Badosa. Next, she defeated Sofia Kenin to reach her second semifinal in the Middle East swing and ninth overall at the WTA 1000-level where she lost in three sets to 12th seed and eventual champion Mirra Andreeva. At Indian Wells, she defeated Suzan Lamens in the second round and Katie Boulter in the third round before losing again to Andreeva in the fourth round, this time in straight sets. Having reached the finals the year prior, Rybakina entered the 2025 Miami Open seeded seventh, and lost to Ashlyn Krueger in three sets in the second round. Defending 500 points from her win in Stuttgart the previous year, she instead opted to play in the qualifiers for the 2025 Billie Jean King Cup and dropped to No. 11 in the rankings on 21 April 2025.

At the Madrid Open, Rybakina defeated Bianca Andreescu in the second round before losing to No. 17 seed Elina Svitolina in the third round. However, at the 2025 Italian Open, she defeated Eva Lys in the second round before losing to Andreescu in the third round. As a last minute entry into the Internationaux de Strasbourg, Rybakina defeated Wang Xinyu, Magda Linette, and No. 9 seed Beatriz Haddad Maia to reach her first final since April 2024. In the final, she defeated eighth seed Liudmila Samsonova in three sets to capture her first title in over a year. Seeded 12th, Rybakina then reached the fourth round of the 2025 French Open, before losing to Iga Świątek in three sets.

Rybakina began her grass season at the WTA 500-level Queen's Club Championships, where she lost in the quarterfinals to the eventual champion, Tatjana Maria. She then reached the quarterfinals of the 2025 Berlin Open, where she lost to Aryna Sabalenka in three sets, despite having four match points. Having reached the semifinals in 2024, Rybakina lost to Clara Tauson in the third round of the 2025 Wimbledon Championships.

In July, Rybakina played in the WTA 500-level 2025 DC Open, reaching the semifinals before losing to eventual champion Leylah Fernandez in a grueling match that lasted over three hours and featured three tiebreaks. She then played in the 2025 National Bank Open in Montreal, Canada, where she again reached the semifinals before losing to wildcard and eventual champion, Victoria Mboko. At the 2025 Cincinnati Open, she defeated world No. 6 Madison Keys in the fourth round, recording her first win against a top-10 player since February. She then defeated world No. 1 Aryna Sabalenka in the quarterfinals, marking her 7th win over a world No. 1 player, before again losing in the semifinals to No. 2 seed and eventual champion, Iga Świątek. Seeded 9th at the 2025 US Open, Rybakina defeated sixteen-year-old wildcard Julieta Pareja, qualifier Tereza Valentová, and doubles partner and former champion Emma Raducanu to reach the fourth round for the first time in her career, where she lost to 2023 Wimbledon Champion Markéta Vondroušová.

At the WTA 1000-level China Open in September, Rybakina had a first round bye, then defeated Caty McNally in the second round before losing to German player Eva Lys in round three. A few weeks later, at the 1000-level Wuhan Open, Rybakina again had a first round bye, and defeated Jaqueline Cristian and Linda Nosková, before losing in straight sets to Aryna Sabalenka in the quarterfinals.

Aiming to qualify for her third straight, WTA finals, Rybakina defeated Dayana Yastremska, qualifier Ajla Tomljanović, No. 2 seed Jasmine Paolini, and No. 4 seed Ekaterina Alexandrova at the 500-level Ningbo Open to earn her second title of the year and tenth overall. She then entered the 500-level Pan Pacific Open, defeating Leylah Fernandez and Victoria Mboko to secure the last remaining spot at the 2025 WTA Finals, before withdrawing from the Tokyo tournament.

In November, at the WTA Finals in Riyadh, despite being the last player to qualify, Rybakina topped 4th-seeded Amanda Anisimova, No. 2 Iga Świątek, and second alternate Ekaterina Alexandrova to reach the semi-finals, going on to defeat 5th seed Jessica Pegula. In the final, she upset world No. 1 Aryna Sabalenka to capture the WTA Finals crown, and extend her 11-match win streak. As a result of her undefeated victory, Rybakina earned a record-breaking $5.235 million in prize money, and finished the season as the world No. 5.

== All matches ==
This table chronicles all the matches of Elena Rybakina in 2025.

Key
W	F	SF	QF	#R	RR	Q#	P#	DNQ	A	Z#	PO	G	S	B	NMS	NTI	P	NH

(W) winner; (F) finalist; (SF) semifinalist; (QF) quarterfinalist; (#R) rounds 4, 3, 2, 1; (RR) round-robin stage; (Q#) qualification round; (P#) preliminary round; (DNQ) did not qualify; (A) absent; (Z#) Davis/Fed Cup Zonal Group (with number indication) or (PO) play-off; (G) gold, (S) silver or (B) bronze Olympic/Paralympic medal; (NMS) not a Masters tournament; (NTI) not a Tier I tournament; (P) postponed; (NH) not held; (SR) strike rate (events won / competed); (W–L) win–loss record.
To avoid confusion and double counting, these charts are updated at the conclusion of a tournament or when the player's participation has ended.

=== Singles matches ===
Tournament	Match	Round	Opponent	Rank	Result	Score
United Cup; Perth/Sydney, Australia; WTA 500; Hard, indoor; 27 December 2024 – 5 January 2025	1	RR	(Spain) Jéssica Bouzas Maneiro (14)	54	Win	6–2, 6–3
United Cup; Perth/Sydney, Australia; WTA 500; Hard, indoor; 27 December 2024 – 5 January 2025	2	RR	(Greece) Maria Sakkari (3)	32	Win	6–4, 6–3
United Cup; Perth/Sydney, Australia; WTA 500; Hard, indoor; 27 December 2024 – 5 January 2025	3	QF	(Germany) Laura Siegemund (11)	80	Win	6–3, 6–1
United Cup; Perth/Sydney, Australia; WTA 500; Hard, indoor; 27 December 2024 – 5 January 2025	4	SF	(Poland) Iga Świątek (2)	2	Loss	6–7^{(5–7)}, 4–6
Australian Open; Melbourne, Australia; Grand Slam; Hard, outdoor; 12 January 2025 – 26 January 2025	5	1R	(Australia) Emerson Jones (WC)	293	Win	6–1, 6–1
Australian Open; Melbourne, Australia; Grand Slam; Hard, outdoor; 12 January 2025 – 26 January 2025	6	2R	(United States) Iva Jovic (WC)	191	Win	6–0, 6–3
Australian Open; Melbourne, Australia; Grand Slam; Hard, outdoor; 12 January 2025 – 26 January 2025	7	3R	(Ukraine) Dayana Yastremska (32)	33	Win	6–3, 6–4
Australian Open; Melbourne, Australia; Grand Slam; Hard, outdoor; 12 January 2025 – 26 January 2025	8	4R	(United States) Madison Keys (19)	14	Loss	3–6, 6–1, 3–6
Abu Dhabi Open; Abu Dhabi, UAE; WTA 500; Hard, outdoor; 3 February 2025 – 8 February 2025	–	1R	Bye			
Abu Dhabi Open; Abu Dhabi, UAE; WTA 500; Hard, outdoor; 3 February 2025 – 8 February 2025	9	2R	(United States) Katie Volynets (Q)	68	Win	2–6, 6–4, 6–4
Abu Dhabi Open; Abu Dhabi, UAE; WTA 500; Hard, outdoor; 3 February 2025 – 8 February 2025	10	QF	(Tunisia) Ons Jabeur	33	Win	6–2, 4–6, 7–6^{(7–4)}
Abu Dhabi Open; Abu Dhabi, UAE; WTA 500; Hard, outdoor; 3 February 2025 – 8 February 2025	11	SF	(Switzerland) Belinda Bencic (WC)	157	Loss	6–3, 3–6, 4–6
Qatar Open; Doha, Qatar; WTA 1000; Hard, outdoor; 9 February 2025 – 15 February 2025	–	1R	Bye			
Qatar Open; Doha, Qatar; WTA 1000; Hard, outdoor; 9 February 2025 – 15 February 2025	12	2R	(United States) Peyton Stearns	47	Win	6–2, 6–4
Qatar Open; Doha, Qatar; WTA 1000; Hard, outdoor; 9 February 2025 – 15 February 2025	13	3R	(Slovakia) Rebecca Šramková	46	Win	7–6^{(7–1)}, 6–2
Qatar Open; Doha, Qatar; WTA 1000; Hard, outdoor; 9 February 2025 – 15 February 2025	14	QF	(Poland) Iga Świątek (2)	2	Loss	2–6, 5–7
Dubai Tennis Championships; Dubai, United Arab Emirates; WTA 1000; Hard, outdoor; 16 February 2025 – 22 February 2025	–	1R	Bye			
Dubai Tennis Championships; Dubai, United Arab Emirates; WTA 1000; Hard, outdoor; 16 February 2025 – 22 February 2025	15	2R	(Japan) Moyuka Uchijima (Q)	62	Win	6–3, 6–2
Dubai Tennis Championships; Dubai, United Arab Emirates; WTA 1000; Hard, outdoor; 16 February 2025 – 22 February 2025	16	3R	(Spain) Paula Badosa (9)	10	Win	4–6, 7–6^{(10–8)}, 7–6^{(7–2)}
Dubai Tennis Championships; Dubai, United Arab Emirates; WTA 1000; Hard, outdoor; 16 February 2025 – 22 February 2025	17	QF	(United States) Sofia Kenin (WC)	56	Win	6–2, 7–6^{(7–2)}
Dubai Tennis Championships; Dubai, United Arab Emirates; WTA 1000; Hard, outdoor; 16 February 2025 – 22 February 2025	18	SF	Mirra Andreeva (12)	14	Loss	4–6, 6–4, 3–6
Indian Wells Open; Indian Wells, United States; WTA 1000; Hard, outdoor; 5 March 2025 – 16 March 2025	–	1R	Bye			
Indian Wells Open; Indian Wells, United States; WTA 1000; Hard, outdoor; 5 March 2025 – 16 March 2025	19	2R	(Netherlands) Suzan Lamens	64	Win	6–3, 6–3
Indian Wells Open; Indian Wells, United States; WTA 1000; Hard, outdoor; 5 March 2025 – 16 March 2025	20	3R	(United Kingdom) Katie Boulter (25)	38	Win	6–0, 7–5
Indian Wells Open; Indian Wells, United States; WTA 1000; Hard, outdoor; 5 March 2025 – 16 March 2025	21	4R	Mirra Andreeva (9)	11	Loss	1–6, 2–6
Miami Open; Miami Gardens, United States; WTA 1000; Hard, outdoor; 18 March 2025 – 30 March 2025	–	1R	Bye			
Miami Open; Miami Gardens, United States; WTA 1000; Hard, outdoor; 18 March 2025 – 30 March 2025	22	2R	(United States) Ashlyn Krueger	40	Loss	4–6, 6–2, 4–6
Billie Jean King Cup; Brisbane, Australia; ITF; Hard, outdoor; 10 April 2025 – 12 April 2025	23	RR	(Colombia) Yuliana Lizarazo	684	Win	6–1, 6–2
Billie Jean King Cup; Brisbane, Australia; ITF; Hard, outdoor; 10 April 2025 – 12 April 2025	24	RR	(Australia) Kimberly Birrell	61	Win	6–3, 7–6
Madrid Open; Madrid, Spain; WTA 1000; Clay, outdoor; 22 April 2025 – 4 May 2025	–	1R	Bye			
Madrid Open; Madrid, Spain; WTA 1000; Clay, outdoor; 22 April 2025 – 4 May 2025	25	2R	(Canada) Bianca Andreescu	132	Win	6–3, 6–2
Madrid Open; Madrid, Spain; WTA 1000; Clay, outdoor; 22 April 2025 – 4 May 2025	26	3R	(Ukraine) Elina Svitolina	17	Loss	3–6, 4–6
Italian Open; Rome, Italy; WTA 1000; Clay, outdoor; 6 May 2025 – 18 May 2025	–	1R	Bye			
Italian Open; Rome, Italy; WTA 1000; Clay, outdoor; 6 May 2025 – 18 May 2025	27	2R	(Germany) Eva Lys	63	Win	7–6^{(7–3)}, 6–2
Italian Open; Rome, Italy; WTA 1000; Clay, outdoor; 6 May 2025 – 18 May 2025	28	3R	(Canada) Bianca Andreescu	121	Loss	2–6, 4–6
Internationaux de Strasbourg; Strasbourg, France; WTA 500; Clay, outdoor; 18 May 2025 – 24 May 2025	–	1R	Bye			
Internationaux de Strasbourg; Strasbourg, France; WTA 500; Clay, outdoor; 18 May 2025 – 24 May 2025	29	2R	(China) Xinyu Wang	42	Win	6–1, 6–3
Internationaux de Strasbourg; Strasbourg, France; WTA 500; Clay, outdoor; 18 May 2025 – 24 May 2025	30	QF	(Poland) Magda Linette	33	Win	7–5, 6–3
Internationaux de Strasbourg; Strasbourg, France; WTA 500; Clay, outdoor; 18 May 2025 – 24 May 2025	31	SF	(Brazil) Beatriz Haddad Maia (9)	23	Win	7–6^{(9–7)}, 1–6, 6–2
Internationaux de Strasbourg; Strasbourg, France; WTA 500; Clay, outdoor; 18 May 2025 – 24 May 2025	32	W	Liudmila Samsonova (8)	19	Win (1)	6–1, 6–7^{(2–7)}, 6–1
French Open; Paris, France; Grand Slam; Clay, outdoor; 25 May 2025 – 8 June 2025	33	1R	(Argentina) Julia Riera (Q)	202	Win	6–1, 4–6, 6–4
French Open; Paris, France; Grand Slam; Clay, outdoor; 25 May 2025 – 8 June 2025	34	2R	(United States) Iva Jovic (WC)	129	Win	6–3, 6–3
French Open; Paris, France; Grand Slam; Clay, outdoor; 25 May 2025 – 8 June 2025	35	3R	(Latvia) Jeļena Ostapenko (21)	21	Win	6–2, 6–2
French Open; Paris, France; Grand Slam; Clay, outdoor; 25 May 2025 – 8 June 2025	36	4R	(Poland) Iga Świątek (5)	5	Loss	6–1, 3–6, 5–7
Queen's Club Championships; London, Great Britain; WTA 500; Grass, outdoor; 9 June 2025 – 15 June 2025	–	1R	Bye			
Queen's Club Championships; London, Great Britain; WTA 500; Grass, outdoor; 9 June 2025 – 15 June 2025	37	2R	(United Kingdom) Heather Watson (Q)	164	Win	6–4, 6–2
Queen's Club Championships; London, Great Britain; WTA 500; Grass, outdoor; 9 June 2025 – 15 June 2025	38	QF	(Germany) Tatjana Maria (Q)	86	Loss	4–6, 6–7^{(4–7)}
German Open; Berlin, Germany; WTA 500; Grass, outdoor; 16 June 2025 – 22 June 2025	39	1R	(United States) Ashlyn Krueger (LL)	33	Win	6–3, 7–6^{(7–3)}
German Open; Berlin, Germany; WTA 500; Grass, outdoor; 16 June 2025 – 22 June 2025	40	2R	(Czech Republic) Kateřina Siniaková (Q)	74	Win	6–4, 7–6^{(7–5)}
German Open; Berlin, Germany; WTA 500; Grass, outdoor; 16 June 2025 – 22 June 2025	41	QF	Aryna Sabalenka (1)	1	Loss	6–7^{(6–8)}, 6–3, 6–7^{(6–8)}
Wimbledon; London, United Kingdom; Grand Slam; Grass, outdoor; 30 June 2025 – 13 July 2025	42	1R	(Armenia) Elina Avanesyan	49	Win	6–2, 6–1
Wimbledon; London, United Kingdom; Grand Slam; Grass, outdoor; 30 June 2025 – 13 July 2025	43	2R	(Greece) Maria Sakkari	77	Win	6–3, 6–1
Wimbledon; London, United Kingdom; Grand Slam; Grass, outdoor; 30 June 2025 – 13 July 2025	44	3R	(Denmark) Clara Tauson (23)	22	Loss	6–7^{(6–8)}, 3–6
Washington Open; Washington, D.C., United States; WTA 500; Hard, outdoor; 21 July 2025 – 27 July 2025	–	1R	Bye			
Washington Open; Washington, D.C., United States; WTA 500; Hard, outdoor; 21 July 2025 – 27 July 2025	45	2R	(Canada) Victoria Mboko (WC)	88	Win	6–3, 7–5
Washington Open; Washington, D.C., United States; WTA 500; Hard, outdoor; 21 July 2025 – 27 July 2025	46	QF	(Poland) Magdalena Fręch (5)	24	Win	6–3, 6–3
Washington Open; Washington, D.C., United States; WTA 500; Hard, outdoor; 21 July 2025 – 27 July 2025	47	SF	(Canada) Leylah Fernandez	36	Loss	7–6^{(7–2)}, 6–7^{(3–7)}, 6–7^{(3–7)}
Canadian Open; Montreal, Canada; WTA 1000; Hard, outdoor; 27 July 2025 – 7 August 2025	–	1R	Bye			
Canadian Open; Montreal, Canada; WTA 1000; Hard, outdoor; 27 July 2025 – 7 August 2025	48	2R	(United States) Hailey Baptiste	50	Win	6–4, 6–3
Canadian Open; Montreal, Canada; WTA 1000; Hard, outdoor; 27 July 2025 – 7 August 2025	49	3R	(Romania) Jaqueline Cristian	52	Win	6–0, 7–6^{(7–5)}
Canadian Open; Montreal, Canada; WTA 1000; Hard, outdoor; 27 July 2025 – 7 August 2025	50	4R	(Ukraine) Dayana Yastremska (30)	35	Win	5–7, 6–2, 7–5
Canadian Open; Montreal, Canada; WTA 1000; Hard, outdoor; 27 July 2025 – 7 August 2025	51	QF	(Ukraine) Marta Kostyuk (24)	28	Win	6–1, 2–1 ret.
Canadian Open; Montreal, Canada; WTA 1000; Hard, outdoor; 27 July 2025 – 7 August 2025	52	SF	(Canada) Victoria Mboko	85	Loss	6–1, 5–7, 6–7^{(4–7)}
Cincinnati Open; Cincinnati, United States; WTA 1000; Hard, outdoor; 7 August 2025 – 18 August 2025	–	1R	Bye			
Cincinnati Open; Cincinnati, United States; WTA 1000; Hard, outdoor; 7 August 2025 – 18 August 2025	53	2R	(Mexico) Renata Zarazúa	70	Win	4–6, 6–0, 7–5
Cincinnati Open; Cincinnati, United States; WTA 1000; Hard, outdoor; 7 August 2025 – 18 August 2025	54	3R	(Belgium) Elise Mertens	22	Win	4–6, 6–3, 7–5
Cincinnati Open; Cincinnati, United States; WTA 1000; Hard, outdoor; 7 August 2025 – 18 August 2025	55	4R	(United States) Madison Keys	6	Win	6–7^{(3–7)}, 6–4, 6–2
Cincinnati Open; Cincinnati, United States; WTA 1000; Hard, outdoor; 7 August 2025 – 18 August 2025	56	QF	Aryna Sabalenka	1	Win	6–1, 6–4
Cincinnati Open; Cincinnati, United States; WTA 1000; Hard, outdoor; 7 August 2025 – 18 August 2025	57	SF	(Poland) Iga Świątek	3	Loss	5–7, 3–6
US Open; New York City, United States; Grand Slam; Hard, outdoor; 24 August 2025 – 7 September 2025	58	1R	(United States) Julieta Pareja (WC)	335	Win	6–3, 6–0
US Open; New York City, United States; Grand Slam; Hard, outdoor; 24 August 2025 – 7 September 2025	59	2R	(Czech Republic) Tereza Valentová (Q)	96	Win	6–3, 7–6^{(9–7)}
US Open; New York City, United States; Grand Slam; Hard, outdoor; 24 August 2025 – 7 September 2025	60	3R	(United Kingdom) Emma Raducanu	36	Win	6–1, 6–2
US Open; New York City, United States; Grand Slam; Hard, outdoor; 24 August 2025 – 7 September 2025	61	4R	(Czech Republic) Markéta Vondroušová	60	Loss	4–6, 7–5, 2–6
China Open; Beijing, China; WTA 1000; Hard, outdoor; 24 September 2025 – 5 October 2025	–	1R	Bye			
China Open; Beijing, China; WTA 1000; Hard, outdoor; 24 September 2025 – 5 October 2025	62	2R	(United States) Caty McNally	90	Win	7–5, 4–6, 6–3
China Open; Beijing, China; WTA 1000; Hard, outdoor; 24 September 2025 – 5 October 2025	63	3R	(Germany) Eva Lys	66	Loss	3–6, 6–1, 4–6
Wuhan Open; Wuhan, China; WTA 1000; Hard, outdoor; 6 October 2025–12 October 2025	–	1R	Bye			
Wuhan Open; Wuhan, China; WTA 1000; Hard, outdoor; 6 October 2025–12 October 2025	64	2R	(Romania) Jaqueline Cristian	48	Win	6–4, 6–3
Wuhan Open; Wuhan, China; WTA 1000; Hard, outdoor; 6 October 2025–12 October 2025	65	3R	(Czech Republic) Linda Nosková	17	Win	6–3 6–4
Wuhan Open; Wuhan, China; WTA 1000; Hard, outdoor; 6 October 2025–12 October 2025	66	QF	Aryna Sabalenka (1)	1	Loss	3–6, 3–6
Ningbo Open; Ningbo, China; WTA 500; Hard, outdoors; 13 October 2025 – 19 October 2025	–	1R	Bye			
Ningbo Open; Ningbo, China; WTA 500; Hard, outdoors; 13 October 2025 – 19 October 2025	67	2R	(Ukraine) Dayana Yastremska	30	Win	6–4, 6–7^{(6–8)}, 6–3
Ningbo Open; Ningbo, China; WTA 500; Hard, outdoors; 13 October 2025 – 19 October 2025	68	QF	(Australia) Alja Tomljanovic (Q)	104	Win	6–2, 6–0
Ningbo Open; Ningbo, China; WTA 500; Hard, outdoors; 13 October 2025 – 19 October 2025	69	SF	(Italy) Jasmine Paolini (2)	8	Win	6–3, 6–2
Ningbo Open; Ningbo, China; WTA 500; Hard, outdoors; 13 October 2025 – 19 October 2025	70	W	Ekaterina Alexandrova (4)	10	Win (2)	3–6, 6–0, 6–2
Toray Pan Pacific Open; Tokyo, Japan; WTA 500; Hard, outdoors; 20 October 2025 – 26 October 2025	–	1R	Bye			
Toray Pan Pacific Open; Tokyo, Japan; WTA 500; Hard, outdoors; 20 October 2025 – 26 October 2025	71	2R	(Canada) Leylah Fernandez	22	Win	6–4, 6–3
Toray Pan Pacific Open; Tokyo, Japan; WTA 500; Hard, outdoors; 20 October 2025 – 26 October 2025	72	QF	(Canada) Victoria Mboko (9)	23	Win	6–3, 7–6^{(7–4)}
Toray Pan Pacific Open; Tokyo, Japan; WTA 500; Hard, outdoors; 20 October 2025 – 26 October 2025	–	SF	(Czech Republic) Linda Nosková (6)	17	Walkover	—N/a
WTA Finals; Riyadh, Saudi Arabia; Year-end championships; Hard, indoor; 1 November 2025 – 8 November 2025	73	RR	(United States) Amanda Anisimova (4)	4	Win	6–3, 6–1
WTA Finals; Riyadh, Saudi Arabia; Year-end championships; Hard, indoor; 1 November 2025 – 8 November 2025	74	RR	(Poland) Iga Świątek (2)	2	Win	3–6, 6–1, 6–0
WTA Finals; Riyadh, Saudi Arabia; Year-end championships; Hard, indoor; 1 November 2025 – 8 November 2025	75	RR	Ekaterina Alexandrova (10)	10	Win	6–4, 6–4
WTA Finals; Riyadh, Saudi Arabia; Year-end championships; Hard, indoor; 1 November 2025 – 8 November 2025	76	SF	(United States) Jessica Pegula (5)	5	Win	4–6, 6–4, 6–3
WTA Finals; Riyadh, Saudi Arabia; Year-end championships; Hard, indoor; 1 November 2025 – 8 November 2025	77	W	Aryna Sabalenka (1)	1	Win (3)	6–3, 7–6^{(7–0)}

=== Doubles matches ===
Tournament	Match	Round	Opponent	Combined Rank	Result	Score
Queen's Club Championships; London, Great Britain; WTA 500; Grass, outdoor; 9 June 2025 – 15 June 2025; Partner: (Kazakhstan) Yulia Putintseva	1	1R	(Spain) Cristina Bucșa / (Brazil) Beatriz Haddad Maia	78	Win	6–3, 5–7, [10–6]
Queen's Club Championships; London, Great Britain; WTA 500; Grass, outdoor; 9 June 2025 – 15 June 2025; Partner: (Kazakhstan) Yulia Putintseva	2	2R	(United States) Asia Muhammad / (Netherlands) Demi Schuurs (4)	32	Loss	1–6, 5–7
Washington Open; Washington, D.C., United States; WTA 500; Hard, outdoor; 21 July 2025 – 27 July 2025; Partner: (United Kingdom) Emma Raducanu	3	1R	(Slovakia) Tereza Mihalíková / (United Kingdom) Olivia Nicholls (4)	32	Win	2–6, 7–6^{(7–4)}, [11–9]
Washington Open; Washington, D.C., United States; WTA 500; Hard, outdoor; 21 July 2025 – 27 July 2025; Partner: (United Kingdom) Emma Raducanu	4	QF	(Mexico) Giuliana Olmos / (Indonesia) Aldila Sutjiadi	95	Win	7–6^{(7–4)}, 6–4
Washington Open; Washington, D.C., United States; WTA 500; Hard, outdoor; 21 July 2025 – 27 July 2025; Partner: (United Kingdom) Emma Raducanu	5	SF	(United States) Taylor Townsend / (China) Shuai Zhang (2)	17	Loss	1–4 ret.

== Tournament schedule ==
Key
W	F	SF	QF	#R	RR

(W) winner; (F) finalist; (SF) semifinalist; (QF) quarterfinalist; (#R) rounds 4, 3, 2, 1; (RR) round-robin stage.

=== Singles schedule ===
Date	Tournament	Location	Category	Surface	Prev. result	Prev. points	New points	Outcome
27 December 2024 – 5 January 2025	United Cup	Australia	WTA 500	Hard	A	500	150	Semifinal lost to (Poland) Iga Świątek; 6–7^{(5–7)}, 4–6
12 January 2025 – 26 January 2025	Australian Open	Australia	Grand Slam	Hard	2R	70	240	Fourth round lost to (United States) Madison Keys; 3–6, 6–1, 3–6
3 February 2025 – 8 February 2025	Abu Dhabi Open	UAE	WTA 500	Hard	W	500	195	Semifinal lost to (Switzerland) Belinda Bencic; 6–3, 3–6, 4–6
9 February 2025 – 15 February 2025	Qatar Open	Qatar	WTA 1000	Hard	F	650	215	Quarterfinal lost to (Poland) Iga Świątek; 2–6, 5–7
16 February 2025 – 22 February 2025	Dubai Tennis Championships	UAE	WTA 1000	Hard	QF	215	390	Semifinal lost to Mirra Andreeva; 4–6, 6–4, 3–6
5 March 2025 – 16 March 2025	Indian Wells Open	United States	WTA 1000	Hard	A	0	120	Fourth round lost to Mirra Andreeva; 1–6, 2–6
18 March 2025 – 30 March 205	Miami Open	United States	WTA 1000	Hard	F	650	10	Second round lost to (United States) Ashlyn Krueger; 4–6, 6–2, 4–6
22 April 2025 – 4 May 2025	Madrid Open	Spain	WTA 1000	Clay	SF	390	65	Third round lost to (Ukraine) Elina Svitolina; 3–6, 4–6
8 May 2025 – 19 May 2025	Italian Open	Italy	WTA 1000	Clay	A	0	65	Third round lost to (Canada) Bianca Andreescu; 2–6, 4–6
18 May 2025 – 24 May 2025	Internationaux de Strasbourg	France	WTA 500	Clay	A	0	500	Winner defeated Liudmila Samsonova; 6–1, 6–7^{(2–7)}, 6–1
25 May 2025 – 8 June 2025	French Open	France	Grand Slam	Clay	QF	430	240	Fourth round lost to (Poland) Iga Świątek; 6–1, 3–6, 5–7
9 June 2025 – 15 June 2025	Queen's Club Championships	Great Britain	WTA 500	Grass	A	0	108	Quarterfinal lost to (Germany) Tatjana Maria; 4–6, 6–7^{(4–7)}
16 June 2025 – 22 June 2025	German Open	Germany	WTA 500	Grass	QF	108	108	Quarterfinal lost to Aryna Sabalenka; 6–7^{(6–8)}, 6–3, 6–7^{(6–8)}
30 June 2025 – 13 July 2025	Wimbledon Championships	United Kingdom	Grand Slam	Grass	SF	780	130	Third round lost to (Denmark) Clara Tauson; 6–7^{(6–8)}, 3–6
21 July 2025 – 27 July 2025	Washington Open	United States	WTA 500	Hard	A	0	195	Semifinal lost to (Canada) Leylah Fernandez; 7–6^{(7–2)}, 6–7^{(3–7)}, 6–7^{(3–7)}
27 July 2025 – 7 August 2025	Canadian Open	Canada	WTA 1000	Hard	A	0	390	Semifinal lost to (Canada) Victoria Mboko; 6–1, 5–7, 6–7^{(4–7)}
7 August 2025 – 18 August 2025	Cincinnati Open	United States	WTA 1000	Hard	2R	10	390	Semifinal lost to (Poland) Iga Świątek; 5–7, 3–6
24 August 2025 – 7 September 2025	US Open	United States	Grand Slam	Hard	2R	70	240	Fourth round lost to (Czech Republic) Marketa Vondrousova; 4–6, 7–5, 2–6
24 September 2025 – 5 October 2025	China Open	China	WTA 1000	Hard	A	0	65	Third round lost to (Germany) Eva Lys; 3–6, 6–1, 4–6
6 October 2025 – 12 October 2025	Wuhan Open	China	WTA 1000	Hard	A	0	215	Quarterfinal lost to Aryna Sabalenka; 3–6, 3–6
13 October 2025 – 19 October 2025	Ningbo Open	China	WTA 500	Hard	A	0	500	Winner defeated Ekaterina Alexandrova; 3–6, 6–0, 6–2
20 October 2025 – 26 October 2025	Pan Pacific Open	Japan	WTA 500	Hard	A	0	195	Withdrew before the semifinals
1 Novewmber 2025 – 8 November 2025	WTA Finals	Saudi Arabia	WTA Finals	Hard	RR	200	1500	Winner defeated Aryna Sabalenka; 6–3, 7–6^{(7–0)}
Total year-end points						5,181	5,850	▲669 (difference)

=== Doubles schedule ===
Date	Tournament	Location	Category	Surface	Prev. result	Prev. points	New points	Outcome
9 June 2025 – 15 June 2025	Queen's Club Championships	Great Britain	WTA 500	Grass	A	0	108	Second round lost to (United States) Asia Muhammad / (Netherlands) Demi Schuurs; 1–6, 5–7,
21 July 2025 – 27 July 2025	Washington Open	United States	WTA 500	Hard	A	0	195	Semifinal lost to (United States) Taylor Townsend / (China) Shuai Zhang; 4–1, ret
Total year-end points						0	303	▲303 (difference)

== Yearly records ==
=== Head-to-head match-ups ===
Rybakina has a 58–19 (75%) WTA match win–loss record in the 2025 season. Her record against players who were part of the WTA rankings top ten at the time of their meetings is 10–6 (63%). Bold indicates player was ranked top 10 at the time of at least one meeting. The following list is ordered by number of wins:

- (Ukraine) Dayana Yastremska 3–0
- (Greece) Maria Sakkari 2–0
- (Romania) Jaqueline Cristian 2–0
- **Ekaterina Alexandrova** 2–0
- (United States) Iva Jovic 2–0
- (Canada) Victoria Mboko 2–1
- **Aryna Sabalenka** 2–2
- (Belgium) Elise Mertens 1–0
- (Spain) Jessica Bouzas Maneiro 1–0
- (Czech Republic) Linda Nosková 1–0
- (Czech Republic) Tereza Valentova 1–0
- (United Kingdom) Emma Raducanu 1–0
- (United States) Katie Volynets 1–0
- (Tunisia) Ons Jabeur 1–0
- (United States) Julieta Pareja 1–0
- (Mexico) Renata Zarazua 1–0
- (United States) Peyton Stearns 1–0
- (Slovakia) Rebecca Sramkova 1–0
- (Japan) Moyuka Uchijima 1–0
- **(Spain) Paula Badosa** 1–0
- (United States) Sofia Kenin 1–0
- (Australia) Emerson Jones 1–0
- (Netherlands) Suzan Lamens 1–0
- (United Kingdom) Katie Boulter 1–0
- Liudmila Samsonova 1–0
- (Poland) Magdalena Fręch 1–0
- (China) Xinyu Wang 1–0
- (Poland) Magda Linette 1–0
- (United Kingdom) Heather Watson 1–0
- (Colombia) Yuliana Lizarazo 1–0
- (Brazil) Beatriz Haddad Maia 1–0
- (Argentina) Julia Riera 1–0
- (Latvia) Jeļena Ostapenko 1–0
- (Australia) Kimberly Birrell 1–0
- (United States) Caty McNally 1–0
- **(Italy) Jasmine Paolini** 1–0
- (Ukraine) Marta Kostyuk 1–0
- (Czech Republic) Kateřina Siniaková 1–0
- (United States) Hailey Baptiste 1–0
- (Armenia) Elina Avanesyan 1–0
- (Australia) Alja Tomljanovic 1–0
- **(United States) Jessica Pegula** 1–0
- **(United States) Amanda Anisimova** 1–0
- (Germany) Laura Siegemund 1–0
- (United States) **Madison Keys** 1–1
- (United States) Ashlyn Krueger 1–1
- (Germany) Eva Lys 1–1
- (Canada) Bianca Andreescu 1–1
- (Canada) Leylah Fernandez 1–1
- **(Poland) Iga Świątek** 1–4
- (Ukraine) Elina Svitolina 0–1
- (Switzerland) Belinda Bencic 0–1
- (Czech Republic) Marketa Vondrousova 1–0
- (Germany) Tatjana Maria 0–1
- (Denmark) Clara Tauson 0–1
- Mirra Andreeva 0–2

=== Top 10 Record ===
Result	W–L	Player	Rk	Event	Surface	Rd	Score	Rk	Ref
Loss	0–1	(Poland) Iga Świątek	2	United Cup, Australia	Hard	SF	6–7(5–7), 4–6	6	
Loss	0–2	(Poland) Iga Świątek	2	Qatar Open, Qatar	Hard	QF	2–6, 5–7	7	
Win	1–2	(Spain) Paula Badosa	10	Dubai Tennis Championships, UAE	Hard	3R	6–0, 6–3	7	
Loss	1–3	(Poland) Iga Świątek	5	French Open, France	Clay	4R	6–7^{(8–10)}, 2–6	11	
Loss	1–4	Aryna Sabalenka	1	German Open, Germany	Grass	QF	6–7^{(6–8)}, 6–3, 6–7^{(6–8)}	11	
Win	2–4	(United States) Madison Keys	6	Cincinnati Open, United States	Hard	4R	6–7^{(3–7)}, 6–4, 6–2	10	
Win	3–4	Aryna Sabalenka	1	Cincinnati Open, United States	Hard	QF	6–1, 6–4	10	
Loss	3–5	(Poland) Iga Świątek	3	Cincinnati Open, United States	Hard	SF	5–7, 3–6	10	
Loss	3–6	Aryna Sabalenka	1	Wuhan Open, China	Hard	QF	3–6, 3–6	9	
Win	4–6	(Italy) Jasmine Paolini	8	Ningbo Open, China	Hard	SF	6–3, 6–2	9	
Win	5–6	Ekaterina Alexandrova	10	Ningbo Open, China	Hard	**W**	3–6, 6–0, 6–2	9	
Win	6–6	(United States) Amanda Anisimova	4	WTA Finals, Saudi Arabia	Hard (i)	RR	6–3, 6–1	6	
Win	7–6	(Poland) Iga Świątek	2	WTA Finals, Saudi Arabia	Hard (i)	RR	3–6, 6–1, 6–0	6	
Win	8–6	Ekaterina Alexandrova	10	WTA Finals, Saudi Arabia	Hard (i)	RR	6–4, 6–4	6	
Win	9–6	(United States) Jessica Pegula	5	WTA Finals, Saudi Arabia	Hard (i)	SF	4–6, 6–4, 6–3	6	
Win	10–6	Aryna Sabalenka	1	WTA Finals, Saudi Arabia	Hard (i)	**W**	6–3, 7–6^{(7–0)}	6	

- Key: (Rk) first use, opponent rank; (Rd) round; (Rk) 2nd use, player rank; (Ref) reference; (F) final; (SF) semifinal; (QF) quarterfinal; (#R) rounds 4, 3, 2, 1; (RR) round-robin stage; (Q#) qualifying rounds or stages (3), 2, 1.

=== Finals ===
==== Singles: 3 (3 titles) ====
Legend Grand Slam tournaments (0–0) WTA Finals (1–0) WTA 1000 (0–0) WTA 500 (2–0) WTA 250 (0–0)	Finals by surface Hard (2–0) Clay (1–0) Grass (0–0)	Finals by setting Outdoor (2–0) Indoor (1–0)

Result	W–L	Date	Tournament	Tier	Surface	Opponent	Score
Win	1–0	May 2025	Internationaux de Strasbourg, France	WTA 500	Clay	Liudmila Samsonova	6–1, 6–7^{(2–7)}, 6–1
Win	2–0	Oct 2025	Ningbo Open, China	WTA 500	Hard	Ekaterina Alexandrova	3–6, 6–0, 6–2
Win	3–0	Nov 2025	WTA Finals, Saudi Arabia	WTA Finals	Hard (i)	Aryna Sabalenka	6–3, 7–6^{(7–0)}

=== Earnings ===
- **Bold** font denotes tournament win

**Singles**
Event	Prize money	Year-to-date
United Cup	$421,350	$421,350
Australian Open	A$420,000	$686,443
Abu Dhabi Open	$59,000	$745,443
Qatar Open	$83,470	$828,913
Dubai Tennis Championships	$181,400	$1,010,313
Indian Wells Open	$103,525	$1,113,838
Miami Open	$35,260	$1,149,098
Madrid Open	€52,925	$1,209,498
Italian Open	€51,665	$1,253,555
**Internationaux de Strasbourg**	**$142,610**	$1,396,165
French Open	€265,000	$1,683,087
Queen's Club Championships	$27,940	$1,711,027
Berlin Ladies Open	$27,940	$1,738,967
Wimbledon Championships	£152,000	$1,945,007
Washington Open	$71,205	$2,016,212
Canadian Open	$206,100	$2,222,312
Cincinnati Open	$206,100	$2,428,412
US Open	$400,000	$2,828,412
China Open	$60,400	$2,888,812
Wuhan Open	$83,250	$2,972,062
**Ningbo Open**	**$164,000**	$3,136,062
Pan Pacific Open	$59,100	$3,195,162
**WTA Finals**	**$5,235,000**	$8,430,162
		$8,430,162
**Doubles**
Event	Prize money	Year-to-date
Queen's Club Championships	$4,920	$4,920
Washington Open	$11,550	$16,470
		$16,470
**Mixed doubles**
Event	Prize money	Year-to-date
US Open	$10,000	$10,000
		$10,000
**Total**
		**$8,456,632**

Figures in United States dollars (USD) unless noted.

== See also ==
- 2025 Coco Gauff tennis season
- 2025 Aryna Sabalenka tennis season
- 2025 Iga Świątek tennis season
- 2025 Madison Keys tennis season
