= 2025 Ningbo Open – Doubles =

Doubles
- 2025 Ningbo Open

Final
- Champions: (United States) Nicole Melichar-Martinez; Liudmila Samsonova
- Runners-up: (Hungary) Tímea Babos (Brazil) Luisa Stefani
- Score: 5–7, 6–4, [10–8]

Details
- Draw: 16
- Seeds: 4

Events
Singles	Doubles
- Ningbo Open

Nicole Melichar-Martinez and Liudmila Samsonova defeated Tímea Babos and Luisa Stefani in the final, 5–7, 6–4, [10–8] to win the doubles tennis title at the 2025 Ningbo Open.

Demi Schuurs and Yuan Yue were the reigning champions, but Yuan did not participate this year. Schuurs partnered Asia Muhammad, but lost in the first round to Lyudmyla Kichenok and Ellen Perez.

== Seeds ==
1. (Chinese Taipei) Hsieh Su-wei / (Czech Republic) Kateřina Siniaková (semifinals)
2. (United States) Asia Muhammad / (Netherlands) Demi Schuurs (first round)
3. (Kazakhstan) Anna Danilina / (Serbia) Aleksandra Krunić (quarterfinals)
4. (Hungary) Tímea Babos / (Brazil) Luisa Stefani (final)

== Draw ==
Key

- Q = Qualifier
- WC = Wild card
- LL = Lucky loser
- Alt = Alternate
- ITF = ITF entry
- PR = Protected ranking
- SR = Special ranking
- SE = Special exempt
- JE = Junior exempt
- JR = Junior Accelerator Programme entrant
- CO = College Accelerator Programme entrant
- NG = Next Gen Accelerator Program entrant
- w/o = Walkover
- r = Retired
- d = Defaulted

=== Draw ===
First round
1	(Chinese Taipei) S-w Hsieh (Czech Republic) K Siniaková	6	6
(Chinese Taipei) H-c Chan (China) X Jiang	3	1
(China) Xin Wang (China) S Zheng	6	6
(United Kingdom) E Appleton (Netherlands) I Haverlag	4	3
3	(Kazakhstan) A Danilina (Serbia) A Krunić	6	7
(United States) S Kenin (Germany) L Siegemund	2	5
WC	(China) Xiy Wang (China) Y Xu	3	6	[7]
(United States) N Melichar-Martinez; L Samsonova	6	3	[10]
(Slovakia) T Mihalíková (United Kingdom) O Nicholls	6	6
(China) H Guo; A Panova	4	4
(Australia) M Joint (Canada) V Mboko	2	2
4	(Hungary) T Babos (Brazil) L Stefani	6	6
(Czech Republic) M Vondroušová (China) S Zhang	4	6	[9]
(Norway) U Eikeri (China) Q Tang	6	4	[11]
(Ukraine) L Kichenok (Australia) E Perez	2	6	[10]
2	(United States) A Muhammad (Netherlands) D Schuurs	6	1	[4]

Quarterfinals
1	(Chinese Taipei) S-w Hsieh (Czech Republic) K Siniaková	w/o
(China) Xin Wang (China) S Zheng
3	(Kazakhstan) A Danilina (Serbia) A Krunić	5	1
(United States) N Melichar-Martinez; L Samsonova	7	6
(Slovakia) T Mihalíková (United Kingdom) O Nicholls	2	6	[2]
4	(Hungary) T Babos (Brazil) L Stefani	6	3	[10]
(Norway) U Eikeri (China) Q Tang	3	6	[11]
(Ukraine) L Kichenok (Australia) E Perez	6	3	[9]

Semifinals
1	(Chinese Taipei) S-w Hsieh (Czech Republic) K Siniaková	6	3	[6]
(United States) N Melichar-Martinez; L Samsonova	4	6	[10]
4	(Hungary) T Babos (Brazil) L Stefani	7	6
(Norway) U Eikeri (China) Q Tang	5	4

Final
(United States) N Melichar-Martinez; L Samsonova	5	6	[10]
4	(Hungary) T Babos (Brazil) L Stefani	7	4	[8]
