= 2025 Billie Jean King Cup finals =

- Date: 16–21 September 2025
- Edition: 62nd
- Draw: 8 teams
- Surface: Hard (Indoor)
- Location: Shenzhen, China
- Venue: Shenzhen Bay Sports Center

Champions
- Italy
- Billie Jean King Cup

Defending champions Italy defeated the United States in the final, 2–0, to win the 2025 Billie Jean King Cup.

The Billie Jean King Cup Finals was the highest level of the Billie Jean King Cup tennis team competition in 2025. The event took place in Shenzhen, China, 16-21 September 2025. The ties were contested in a best-of-three rubbers format, played on one day, consisting of two singles and, where needed, followed by a doubles rubber. The finals featured 8 teams competing in a knockout format.

== Participating teams ==
8 nations took part in the Finals. The qualification is as follows:

- 6 qualifying round group winners
- 1 defending champion (Italy)
- 1 host nation (China)

Participating teams
China (H)	Great Britain	Italy (TH)	Japan
Kazakhstan	Spain	Ukraine	United States

=== Seeds ===
1. Italy (champions)
2. Great Britain (semifinals)
3. United States (final)
4. Spain (quarterfinals)

=== Team nominations ===
SR = Singles ranking, DR = Doubles ranking. Rankings are as of 15 September 2025.

China
Player	SR	DR
Wang Xinyu	34	102
Yuan Yue	102	57
Zhang Shuai	114	14
Wang Xiyu	141	288
Jiang Xinyu	–	26
Captain: Liu Feng

Great Britain
Player	SR	DR
Katie Boulter	55	311
Francesca Jones	73	–
Sonay Kartal	82	174
Jodie Burrage	149	123
Captain: Anne Keothavong

Italy
Player	SR	DR
Jasmine Paolini	8	5
Lucia Bronzetti	74	195
Elisabetta Cocciaretto	91	139
Tyra Caterina Grant	211	286
Sara Errani	466	5
Captain: Tathiana Garbin

Japan
Player	SR	DR
Moyuka Uchijima	92	104
Ena Shibahara	164	68
Nao Hibino	201	181
Eri Hozumi	924	29
Shuko Aoyama	–	38
Captain: Ai Sugiyama

Kazakhstan
Player	SR	DR
Elena Rybakina	10	265
Yulia Putintseva	61	107
Zarina Diyas	233	1086
Zhibek Kulambayeva	302	109
Anna Danilina	–	13
Captain: Yuriy Schukin

Spain
Player	SR	DR
Paula Badosa	20	187
Jéssica Bouzas Maneiro	51	938
Cristina Bucșa	63	30
Leyre Romero Gormaz	127	226
Aliona Bolsova	251	122
Captain: Carla Suárez Navarro

Ukraine
Player	SR	DR
Elina Svitolina	13	–
Marta Kostyuk	26	79
Yuliia Starodubtseva	87	410
Lyudmyla Kichenok	–	32
Nadiia Kichenok	–	55
Captain: Illya Marchenko

United States
Player	SR	DR
Jessica Pegula	7	71
Emma Navarro	18	1503
McCartney Kessler	38	49
Hailey Baptiste	50	136
Taylor Townsend	116	1
Captain: Lindsay Davenport

=== Bracket ===
Quarterfinals
1	Italy	2
China	0
4	Spain	0
Ukraine	2
Kazakhstan	1
3	United States	2
Japan	0
2	Great Britain	2

Semifinals
1	Italy	2
Ukraine	1
3	United States	2
2	Great Britain	0

Finals
1	Italy	2
3	United States	0

== Results ==
=== Quarterfinals ===
==== Italy vs. China ====
Italy
2
Shenzhen, China
16 September 2025
Hard (i)

China
0

			1	2	3
1	(Italy) (China)	Elisabetta Cocciaretto; Yuan Yue	4; 6	7; 5	7; 5
2	(Italy) (China)	Jasmine Paolini; Wang Xinyu	4; 6	7^{7} 6^{4}	6; 4
3	(Italy) (China)	Sara Errani / Jasmine Paolini; Jiang Xinyu / Zhang Shuai				not played

==== Spain vs. Ukraine ====
Spain
0
Shenzhen, China
17 September 2025
Hard (i)

Ukraine
2

			1	2	3
1	(Spain) (Ukraine)	Jéssica Bouzas Maneiro; Marta Kostyuk	6^{3} 7^{7}	2; 6
2	(Spain) (Ukraine)	Paula Badosa; Elina Svitolina	7; 5	2; 6	5; 7
3	(Spain) (Ukraine)	Aliona Bolsova / Cristina Bucșa; Lyudmyla Kichenok / Nadiia Kichenok				not played

==== Kazakhstan vs. United States ====
Kazakhstan
1
Shenzhen, China
18 September 2025
Hard (i)

United States
2

			1	2	3
1	(Kazakhstan) (United States)	Yulia Putintseva; Emma Navarro	5; 7	6; 2	6^{6} 7^{8}
2	(Kazakhstan) (United States)	Elena Rybakina; Jessica Pegula	6; 4	6; 1
3	(Kazakhstan) (United States)	Elena Rybakina / Yulia Putintseva; Jessica Pegula / Taylor Townsend	2; 6	6^{1} 7^{7}

==== Japan vs. Great Britain ====
Japan
0
Shenzhen, China
18 September 2025
Hard (i)

Great Britain
2

			1	2	3
1	(Japan) (United Kingdom)	Ena Shibahara; Sonay Kartal	3; 6	6^{4} 7^{7}
2	(Japan) (United Kingdom)	Moyuka Uchijima; Katie Boulter	2; 6	1; 6
3	(Japan) (United Kingdom)	Shuko Aoyama / Eri Hozumi; Jodie Burrage / Francesca Jones				not played

=== Semifinals ===
==== Italy vs. Ukraine ====
Italy
2
Shenzhen, China
19 September 2025
Hard (i)

Ukraine
1

			1	2	3
1	(Italy) (Ukraine)	Elisabetta Cocciaretto; Marta Kostyuk	2; 6	3; 6
2	(Italy) (Ukraine)	Jasmine Paolini; Elina Svitolina	3; 6	6; 4	6; 4
3	(Italy) (Ukraine)	Sara Errani / Jasmine Paolini; Lyudmyla Kichenok / Marta Kostyuk	6; 2	6; 3

==== United States vs. Great Britain ====
United States
2
Shenzhen, China
20 September 2025
Hard (i)

Great Britain
0

			1	2	3
1	(United States) (United Kingdom)	Emma Navarro; Sonay Kartal	3; 6	6; 4	6; 3
2	(United States) (United Kingdom)	Jessica Pegula; Katie Boulter	3; 6	6; 4	6; 2
3	(United States) (United Kingdom)	Hailey Baptiste / McCartney Kessler; Jodie Burrage / Francesca Jones				not played

=== Final ===
==== Italy vs. United States ====
Italy
2
Shenzhen, China
21 September 2025
Hard (i)

United States
0

			1	2	3
1	(Italy) (United States)	Elisabetta Cocciaretto; Emma Navarro	6; 4	6; 4
2	(Italy) (United States)	Jasmine Paolini; Jessica Pegula	6; 4	6; 2
3	(Italy) (United States)	Sara Errani / Jasmine Paolini; Hailey Baptiste / McCartney Kessler				not played
