= 2024 WTA Finals – Singles =

Singles
- 2024 WTA Finals

Final
- Champion: (United States) Coco Gauff
- Runner-up: (China) Zheng Qinwen
- Score: 3–6, 6–4, 7–6^{(7–2)}

Details
- Draw: 8 (round robin + elimination)
- Seeds: 8

Events
Singles	Doubles
← 2023 ·	WTA Finals	· 2025 →

Coco Gauff defeated Zheng Qinwen in the final, 3–6, 6–4, 7–6^{(7–2)} to win the singles tennis title at the 2024 WTA Finals. It was her ninth career WTA Tour singles title.

Gauff was the first American to win the title since Serena Williams in 2014, the youngest player to win the title since Maria Sharapova in 2004, and the youngest player to defeat both the world No. 1 and No. 2 at the same tournament since Sharapova at the 2006 US Open. By winning, Gauff broke the record for largest prize money earned as a single event of any female tennis player with $4.805 million USD.

Iga Świątek was the defending champion, but was eliminated in the round-robin stage. This marked the first time since 2018 that the defending champion was eliminated in the round-robin stage.

Świątek and Aryna Sabalenka were in contention for the WTA No. 1 ranking. Sabalenka secured the year-end world No. 1 ranking for the first time in her career after winning her first two round-robin matches, and Świątek also losing one round-robin match.

Jasmine Paolini and Zheng made their debuts in the singles competition. Zheng became the second Chinese player to reach the final, after Li Na in 2013, the first player to reach the final on tournament debut since Anett Kontaveit in 2021, and youngest to reach the final on debut since Petra Kvitová in 2011. Paolini was the only player in this edition to qualify for both the singles and doubles tournaments.

Ranked No. 13 entering the tournament, Barbora Krejčíková became the lowest-ranked player to reach the semifinals since Sandrine Testud in 2001.

Jessica Pegula withdrew from the tournament before her final group match due to a knee injury and was replaced by first alternate Daria Kasatkina.

== Seeds ==
1. Aryna Sabalenka (semifinals)
2. (Poland) Iga Świątek (round robin)
3. (United States) Coco Gauff (champion)
4. (Italy) Jasmine Paolini (round robin)
5. (Kazakhstan) Elena Rybakina (round robin)
6. (United States) Jessica Pegula (round robin, withdrew)
7. (China) Zheng Qinwen (final)
8. (Czech Republic) Barbora Krejčíková (semifinals)

== Alternates ==
1. Daria Kasatkina (replaced Pegula, round robin)
2. (United States) Danielle Collins (did not play)

Notes:

- (United States) Emma Navarro qualified as an alternate but withdrew before the start of the event.

== Draw ==
Key

- Q = Qualifier
- WC = Wild card
- LL = Lucky loser
- Alt = Alternate
- ITF = ITF entry
- PR = Protected ranking
- SR = Special ranking
- SE = Special exempt
- JE = Junior exempt
- JR = Junior Accelerator Programme entrant
- CO = College Accelerator Programme entrant
- NG = Next Gen Accelerator Program entrant
- w/o = Walkover
- r = Retired
- d = Defaulted

=== Finals ===
Semifinals
1	Aryna Sabalenka	6^{4}	3
3	(United States) Coco Gauff	7^{7}	6
8	(Czech Republic) Barbora Krejčíková	3	5
7	(China) Zheng Qinwen	6	7

Final
3	(United States) Coco Gauff	3	6	7^{7}
7	(China) Zheng Qinwen	6	4	6^{2}

=== Purple Group ===
		Sabalenka	(Italy) Paolini	(Kazakhstan) Rybakina	(China) Zheng	RR; W–L	Set; W–L	Game; W–L	Standings
1	Aryna Sabalenka		6–3, 7–5	4–6, 6–3, 1–6	6–3, 6–4	2–1	5–2 (71%)	36–30 (55%)	1
4	(Italy) Jasmine Paolini	3–6, 5–7		7–6^{(7–5)}, 6–4	1–6, 1–6	1–2	2–4 (33%)	23–35 (40%)	3
5	(Kazakhstan) Elena Rybakina	6–4, 3–6, 6–1	6–7^{(5–7)}, 4–6		6–7^{(4–7)}, 6–3, 1–6	1–2	3–5 (38%)	38–40 (49%)	4
7	(China) Zheng Qinwen	3–6, 4–6	6–1, 6–1	7–6^{(7–4)}, 3–6, 6–1		2–1	4–3 (57%)	35–27 (56%)	2

=== Orange Group ===
		(Poland) Świątek	(United States) Gauff	(United States) Pegula; Kasatkina	(Czech Republic) Krejčíková	RR; W–L	Set; W–L	Game; W–L	Standings
2	(Poland) Iga Świątek		3–6, 4–6	6–1, 6–0 (w/ Kasatkina)	4–6, 7–5, 6–2	2–1	4–3 (57%)	36–26 (58%)	3
3	(United States) Coco Gauff	6–3, 6–4		6–3, 6–2 (w/ Pegula)	5–7, 4–6	2–1	4–2 (67%)	33–25 (57%)	2
6; 9	(United States) Jessica Pegula; Daria Kasatkina	1–6, 0–6 (w/ Kasatkina)	3–6, 2–6 (w/ Pegula)		3–6, 3–6 (w/ Pegula)	0–2; 0–1	0–4 (0%); 0–2 (0%)	11–24 (31%); 1–12 (8%)	X 4
8	(Czech Republic) Barbora Krejčíková	6–4, 5–7, 2–6	7–5, 6–4	6–3, 6–3 (w/ Pegula)		2–1	5–2 (71%)	38–32 (54%)	1

Standings are determined by: 1. number of wins; 2. number of matches; 3. in two-player ties, head-to-head records; 4. in three-player ties, (a) percentage of sets won (head-to-head records if two players remain tied), then (b) percentage of games won (head-to-head records if two players remain tied), then (c) WTA rankings.
