= 2025 Ningbo Open – Singles =

Women's tennis tournament

Singles
- 2025 Ningbo Open

Final
- Champion: (Kazakhstan) Elena Rybakina
- Runner-up: Ekaterina Alexandrova
- Score: 3–6, 6–0, 6–2

Details
- Draw: 28 (6 Q / 4 WC)
- Seeds: 8

Events
| Singles | Doubles |
- Ningbo Open

Elena Rybakina defeated Ekaterina Alexandrova in the final, 3–6, 6–0, 6–2 to win the singles tennis title at the 2025 Ningbo Open. It was her 10th WTA Tour title.

Daria Kasatkina was the reigning champion, but withdrew before the tournament began due to personal reasons.

== Seeds ==
The top four seeds received a bye into the second round.

1. Mirra Andreeva (second round)
2. (Italy) Jasmine Paolini (semifinals)
3. (Kazakhstan) Elena Rybakina (champion)
4. Ekaterina Alexandrova (final)
5. (Denmark) Clara Tauson (first round)
6. (Switzerland) Belinda Bencic (quarterfinals)
7. Diana Shnaider (semifinals)
8. Liudmila Samsonova (second round)

== Draw ==
Key

- Q = Qualifier
- WC = Wild card
- LL = Lucky loser
- Alt = Alternate
- ITF = ITF entry
- PR = Protected ranking
- SR = Special ranking
- SE = Special exempt
- JE = Junior exempt
- JR = Junior Accelerator Programme entrant
- CO = College Accelerator Programme entrant
- NG = Next Gen Accelerator Program entrant
- w/o = Walkover
- r = Retired
- d = Defaulted

=== Finals ===
Semifinals
7 | Diana Shnaider | 3 | 4
4 | Ekaterina Alexandrova | 6 | 6
3 | (Kazakhstan) Elena Rybakina | 6 | 6
2 | (Italy) Jasmine Paolini | 3 | 2

Final
4 | Ekaterina Alexandrova | 6 | 0 | 2
3 | (Kazakhstan) Elena Rybakina | 3 | 6 | 6

=== Top half ===
First round
(United Kingdom) E Raducanu | 6 | 4 | 1
WC | (China) L Zhu | 3 | 6 | 6
PR | (Czech Republic) M Vondroušová | 4 | 3
(Czech Republic) K Muchová | 6 | 6
WC | (China) Xiy Wang | 5 | 3
7 | D Shnaider | 7 | 6
WC | (China) Y Yuan | 6 | 6
(China) Xin Wang | 3 | 3
(United States) S Kenin | 1 | 0
(United States) M Kessler | 6 | 6
Q | (China) H Guo | 2 | 4
8 | L Samsonova | 6 | 6

Second round
1 | M Andreeva | 6 | 3 | 2
WC | (China) L Zhu | 4 | 6 | 6
(Czech Republic) K Muchová | 6 | 1 | 2
7 | D Shnaider | 2 | 6 | 6
4 | E Alexandrova | 6 | 6
WC | (China) Y Yuan | 3 | 3
(United States) M Kessler | 7^{7} | 6
8 | L Samsonova | 6^{5} | 1

Quarterfinals
WC | (China) L Zhu | 6 | 3 | 1
7 | D Shnaider | 2 | 6 | 6
4 | E Alexandrova | 6 | 6
(United States) M Kessler | 3 | 3

Semifinals
7 | D Shnaider | 3 | 4
4 | E Alexandrova | 6 | 6

=== Bottom half ===
First round
5 | (Denmark) C Tauson | 6 | 6^{4} | 3
Q | (Australia) A Tomljanović | 1 | 7^{7} | 6
Q | A Sasnovich | 6 | 5 | 3
Q | (Turkey) Z Sönmez | 2 | 7 | 6
(Canada) V Mboko | 3 | 6^{3}
(Ukraine) D Yastremska | 6 | 7^{7}
6 | (Switzerland) B Bencic | 6 | 6
(Poland) M Linette | 3 | 2
Q | (Kazakhstan) Y Putintseva | 4 | 2
Q | (Ukraine) Y Starodubtseva | 6 | 6
LL | (Croatia) A Ružić | 3 | 2
V Kudermetova | 6 | 6

Second round
Q | (Australia) A Tomljanović | 7^{8} | 6
Q | (Turkey) Z Sönmez | 6^{6} | 3
(Ukraine) D Yastremska | 4 | 7^{8} | 3
3 | (Kazakhstan) E Rybakina | 6 | 6^{6} | 6
6 | (Switzerland) B Bencic | 5 | 6 | 7
Q | (Ukraine) Y Starodubtseva | 7 | 4 | 5
V Kudermetova | 2 | 5
2 | (Italy) J Paolini | 6 | 7

Quarterfinals
Q | (Australia) A Tomljanović | 2 | 0
3 | (Kazakhstan) E Rybakina | 6 | 6
6 | (Switzerland) B Bencic | 7 | 5 | 3
2 | (Italy) J Paolini | 5 | 7 | 6

Semifinals
3 | (Kazakhstan) E Rybakina | 6 | 6
2 | (Italy) J Paolini | 3 | 2

== Qualifying ==
=== Seeds ===
1. (United States) McCartney Kessler (moved to main draw)
2. (Australia) Maya Joint (first round)
3. (Germany) Tatjana Maria (first round)
4. (Germany) Laura Siegemund (withdrew, was still playing in Wuhan)
5. (Kazakhstan) Yulia Putintseva (qualified)
6. Polina Kudermetova (first round)
7. (Italy) Lucia Bronzetti (first round)
8. (Turkey) Zeynep Sönmez (qualified)
9. (Croatia) Antonia Ružić (qualifying competition, lucky loser)
10. (Colombia) Camila Osorio (qualifying competition)
11. Kamilla Rakhimova (qualifying competition)
12. (Australia) Priscilla Hon (first round)

=== Qualifiers ===
1. (Ukraine) Yuliia Starodubtseva
2. (Australia) Ajla Tomljanović
3. Aliaksandra Sasnovich
4. (Turkey) Zeynep Sönmez
5. (Kazakhstan) Yulia Putintseva
6. (China) Guo Hanyu

=== Lucky loser ===
1. (Croatia) Antonia Ružić

=== Qualifying draw ===
==== First qualifier ====
First round
Alt | (China) Qu Yihan | 6 | 2 | 3
(Germany) Tamara Korpatsch | 2 | 6 | 6
(Ukraine) Yuliia Starodubtseva | 7^{7} | 6
12 | (Australia) Priscilla Hon | 6^{0} | 1

Qualifying competition
(Germany) Tamara Korpatsch | 1 | 3
(Ukraine) Yuliia Starodubtseva | 6 | 6

==== Second qualifier ====
First round
2 | (Australia) Maya Joint | 6 | 2 | 4
(Australia) Ajla Tomljanović | 4 | 6 | 6
(Bulgaria) Viktoriya Tomova | 6^{1} | 6 | 1
9 | (Croatia) Antonia Ružić | 7^{7} | 2 | 6

Qualifying competition
(Australia) Ajla Tomljanović | 6 | 6
9 | (Croatia) Antonia Ružić | 2 | 0

==== Third qualifier ====
First round
3 | (Germany) Tatjana Maria | 0 | 1
Aliaksandra Sasnovich | 6 | 6
WC | (Austria) Lilli Tagger | 4 | 2
10 | (Colombia) Camila Osorio | 6 | 6

Qualifying competition
Aliaksandra Sasnovich | 6 | 6
10 | (Colombia) Camila Osorio | 4 | 4

==== Fourth qualifier ====
First round
Alt | (China) Yang Yidi | 6 | 6
WC | (China) Zheng Saisai | 1 | 2
(Czech Republic) Linda Fruhvirtová | 4 | 1
8 | (Turkey) Zeynep Sönmez | 6 | 6

Qualifying competition
Alt | (China) Yang Yidi | 1 | 1
8 | (Turkey) Zeynep Sönmez | 6 | 6

==== Fifth qualifier ====
First round
5 | (Kazakhstan) Yulia Putintseva | 6 | 6
(Poland) Katarzyna Kawa | 0 | 3
(Australia) Talia Gibson | 6 | 7^{8}
7 | (Italy) Lucia Bronzetti | 3 | 6^{6}

Qualifying competition
5 | (Kazakhstan) Yulia Putintseva | 1 | 6 | 6
(Australia) Talia Gibson | 6 | 3 | 2

==== Sixth qualifier ====
First round
6 | Polina Kudermetova | 2 | 3
WC | (China) Guo Hanyu | 6 | 6
WC | (China) Chen Mengyi | 1 | 0
11 | Kamilla Rakhimova | 6 | 6

Qualifying competition
WC | (China) Guo Hanyu | 6 | 5 | 7
11 | Kamilla Rakhimova | 4 | 7 | 5
