= 2025 Ningbo Open =

- Date: 13–19 October
- Edition: 8th
- Category: WTA 500
- Draw: 28S / 16D
- Surface: Hard / outdoor
- Location: Ningbo, China
- Venue: Ningbo Yinzhou Tennis Center

Champions

Singles
- (Kazakhstan) Elena Rybakina

Doubles
- (United States) Nicole Melichar-Martinez / Liudmila Samsonova
- Ningbo Open

The 2025 Ningbo Open (also known as the AUX Ningbo Open for sponsorship reasons) was a professional women's tennis tournament played on outdoor hardcourts. It was the 8th women's edition of the Ningbo Open and a WTA 500 tournament on the 2025 WTA Tour. It took place at the Yinzhou Tennis Center in Ningbo, China, from 13 to 19 October 2025.

== Champions ==
=== Singles ===
- (Kazakhstan) Elena Rybakina def. Ekaterina Alexandrova, 3–6, 6–0, 6–2

=== Doubles ===
- (United States) Nicole Melichar-Martinez / Liudmila Samsonova def. (Hungary) Tímea Babos / (Brazil) Luisa Stefani, 5–7, 6–4, [10–8]

== Singles main-draw entrants ==
=== Seeds ===
| Country | Player | Rank^{1} | Seed |
|---|---|---|---|
| | Mirra Andreeva | 5 | 1 |
| ITA | Jasmine Paolini | 8 | 2 |
| KAZ | Elena Rybakina | 9 | 3 |
| | Ekaterina Alexandrova | 11 | 4 |
| DEN | Clara Tauson | 12 | 5 |
| SUI | Belinda Bencic | 15 | 6 |
| | Diana Shnaider | 18 | 7 |
| | Liudmila Samsonova | 20 | 8 |

- ^{1} Rankings are as of 6 October 2025

=== Other entrants ===
The following players received wildcards into the singles main draw:

- (China) Wang Xiyu
- (China) Yuan Yue
- ~~(China) Zhang Shuai~~
- (China) Zhu Lin

The following player received entry using a protected ranking:

- (Czech Republic) Markéta Vondroušová

The following players received entry from the qualifying draw:

- (China) Guo Hanyu
- (Kazakhstan) Yulia Putintseva
- Aliaksandra Sasnovich
- (Turkey) Zeynep Sönmez
- (Ukraine) Yuliia Starodubtseva
- (Australia) Ajla Tomljanović

The following player received entry as a lucky loser:

- (Croatia) Antonia Ružić

=== Withdrawals ===
- (United States) Amanda Anisimova → replaced by (United Kingdom) Emma Raducanu
- (Spain) Paula Badosa → replaced by (Ukraine) Dayana Yastremska
- (Australia) Daria Kasatkina → replaced by Veronika Kudermetova
- (United States) Emma Navarro → replaced by (Poland) Magda Linette
- (United States) Jessica Pegula → replaced by (China) Wang Xinyu
- (Ukraine) Elina Svitolina → replaced by (Canada) Victoria Mboko
- (China) Zhang Shuai → replaced by (Croatia) Antonia Ružić
- (China) Zheng Qinwen → replaced by (United States) Sofia Kenin

== Doubles main-draw entrants ==
=== Seeds ===
| Country | Player | Country | Player | Rank^{1} | Seed |
|---|---|---|---|---|---|
| TPE | Hsieh Su-wei | CZE | Kateřina Siniaková | 11 | 1 |
| USA | Asia Muhammad | NED | Demi Schuurs | 31 | 2 |
| KAZ | Anna Danilina | SRB | Aleksandra Krunić | 37 | 3 |
| HUN | Tímea Babos | BRA | Luisa Stefani | 41 | 4 |

- ^{1} Rankings are as of 6 October 2025

=== Other entrants ===
The following pair received entry as wildcards:

- (China) Wang Xiyu / (China) Xu Yifan
