= 2025 WTA Finals – Singles =

Singles
- 2025 WTA Finals

Final
- Champion: (Kazakhstan) Elena Rybakina
- Runner-up: Aryna Sabalenka
- Score: 6–3, 7–6^{(7–0)}

Details
- Draw: 8 (round robin + elimination)
- Seeds: 8

Events
| Singles | Doubles |
- WTA Finals

Elena Rybakina defeated Aryna Sabalenka in the final, 6–3, 7–6^{(7–0)} to win the singles tennis title at the 2025 WTA Finals. It was her 11th WTA Tour-level title, and she became the first Kazakhstani player and first player representing an Asian country to win the WTA Finals. By winning the title undefeated, Rybakina won $5.235 million USD in prize money, breaking the previous year's record for the largest prize money earned by a female tennis player at a single event.

Coco Gauff was the defending champion, but was eliminated in the round-robin stage.

Sabalenka was the first player to qualify for at least three consecutive editions as the top seed since Steffi Graf from 1993 to 1996, and the fourth woman to do so overall, after Chris Evert, Martina Navratilova and Graf. She was the first player to reach the final of three majors and the WTA Finals in the same season since Angelique Kerber in 2016.

Amanda Anisimova and Ekaterina Alexandrova (as an alternate) made their debuts in the singles competition. For the first time since 2002, four American women qualified for the singles competition. Madison Keys withdrew from the tournament before her final group match due to illness and was replaced by second alternate Alexandrova. First alternate Mirra Andreeva declined to serve as the replacement. As in the previous year, Jasmine Paolini was the only player to qualify for both the singles and doubles tournaments.

== Seeds ==
1. Aryna Sabalenka (final)
2. (Poland) Iga Świątek (round robin)
3. (United States) Coco Gauff (round robin)
4. (United States) Amanda Anisimova (semifinals)
5. (United States) Jessica Pegula (semifinals)
6. (Kazakhstan) Elena Rybakina (champion)
7. (United States) Madison Keys (round robin, withdrew)
8. (Italy) Jasmine Paolini (round robin)

== Alternates ==
1. Mirra Andreeva (did not play) (Note: Andreeva declined to replace Keys due to fitness.)
2. Ekaterina Alexandrova (round robin, replaced Keys)

== Draw ==
Key

- Q = Qualifier
- WC = Wild card
- LL = Lucky loser
- Alt = Alternate
- ITF = ITF entry
- PR = Protected ranking
- SR = Special ranking
- SE = Special exempt
- JE = Junior exempt
- JR = Junior Accelerator Programme entrant
- CO = College Accelerator Programme entrant
- NG = Next Gen Accelerator Program entrant
- w/o = Walkover
- r = Retired
- d = Defaulted

=== Finals ===
Semifinals
1 | Aryna Sabalenka | 6 | 3 | 6
4 | (United States) Amanda Anisimova | 3 | 6 | 3
5 | (United States) Jessica Pegula | 6 | 4 | 3
6 | (Kazakhstan) Elena Rybakina | 4 | 6 | 6

Final
1 | Aryna Sabalenka | 3 | 6^{0}
6 | (Kazakhstan) Elena Rybakina | 6 | 7^{7}

=== Stefanie Graf Group ===
| | | Sabalenka | (United States) Gauff | (United States) Pegula | (Italy) Paolini | RR; W–L | Set; W–L | Game; W–L | Standings |
| 1 | Aryna Sabalenka | | 7–6^{(7–5)}, 6–2 | 6–4, 2–6, 6–3 | 6–3, 6–1 | 3–0 | 6–1 (86%) | 39–25 (61%) | 1 |
| 3 | (United States) Coco Gauff | 6–7^{(5–7)}, 2–6 | | 3–6, 7–6^{(7–4)}, 2–6 | 6–3, 6–2 | 1–2 | 3–4 (43%) | 32–36 (47%) | 3 |
| 5 | (United States) Jessica Pegula | 4–6, 6–2, 3–6 | 6–3, 6–7^{(4–7)}, 6–2 | | 6–2, 6–3 | 2–1 | 5–3 (63%) | 43–31 (58%) | 2 |
| 8 | (Italy) Jasmine Paolini | 3–6, 1–6 | 3–6, 2–6 | 2–6, 3–6 | | 0–3 | 0–6 (0%) | 14–36 (28%) | 4 |

=== Serena Williams Group ===
| | | (Poland) Świątek | (United States) Anisimova | (Kazakhstan) Rybakina | (United States) Keys; Alexandrova | RR; W–L | Set; W–L | Game; W–L | Standings |
| 2 | (Poland) Iga Świątek | | 7–6^{(7–3)}, 4–6, 2–6 | 6–3, 1–6, 0–6 | 6–1, 6–2 (w/ Keys) | 1–2 | 4–4 (50%) | 32–36 (47%) | 3 |
| 4 | (United States) Amanda Anisimova | 6–7^{(3–7)}, 6–4, 6–2 | | 3–6, 1–6 | 4–6, 6–3, 6–2 (w/ Keys) | 2–1 | 4–4 (50%) | 38–36 (51%) | 2 |
| 6 | (Kazakhstan) Elena Rybakina | 3–6, 6–1, 6–0 | 6–3, 6–1 | | 6–4, 6–4 (w/ Alexandrova) | 3–0 | 6–1 (86%) | 39–19 (67%) | 1 |
| 7; 10 | (United States) Madison Keys; Ekaterina Alexandrova | 1–6, 2–6 (w/ Keys) | 6–4, 3–6, 2–6 (w/ Keys) | 4–6, 4–6 (w/ Alexandrova) | | 0–2; 0–1 | 1–4 (20%); 0–2 (0%) | 14–28 (33%); 8–12 (40%) | X 4 |

Standings are determined by: 1. number of wins; 2. number of matches; 3. in two-player ties, head-to-head records; 4. in three-player ties, (a) percentage of sets won (head-to-head records if two players remain tied), then (b) percentage of games won (head-to-head records if two players remain tied), then (c) WTA rankings.
