= 2026 Jiangxi Open =

- Date: 4–10 May
- Edition: 10th
- Category: WTA 125
- Draw: 32S / 16D
- Prize money: $115,000
- Surface: Hard, outdoor
- Location: Jiujiang, China
- Venue: Jiujiang International Tennis Center

Champions

Singles
- (Chinese Taipei) Liang En-shuo

Doubles
- (Chinese Taipei) Lee Ya-hsin / (China) Ye Qiuyu
- Jiangxi Open

The 2026 Jiangxi Open was a women's professional tennis tournament played on outdoor hard courts. It was the 10th edition of the event, and part of the WTA 125 tournaments of the 2026 season. It took place in Jiujiang, China, from 4 to 10 May 2026. The tournament used to be held as a WTA 250 event until 2025 until it was replaced on the WTA Tour by the Athens Open and hence was staged as a WTA 125 event in 2026.

== Singles main draw entrants ==
=== Seeds ===
| Country | Player | Rank^{1} | Seed |
|---|---|---|---|
| THA | Lanlana Tararudee | 113 | 1 |
| AUS | Taylah Preston | 148 | 2 |
| CHN | Ma Yexin | 175 | 3 |
| THA | Mananchaya Sawangkaew | 186 | 4 |
| CHN | You Xiaodi | 194 | 5 |
| JPN | Aoi Ito | 210 | 6 |
| CHN | Gao Xinyu | 230 | 7 |
| | Anastasia Zolotareva | 244 | 8 |

- Rankings are as of 20 April 2026.

=== Other entrants ===
The following players received wildcards into the singles main draw:

- (China) Gao Xinyu
- (China) Lu Jiajing
- (China) Wang Jiaqi
- (China) Yao Xinxin

The following players received entry from the qualifying draw:

- (China) Li Zongyu
- (Hong Kong) Cody Wong
- (Canada) Carol Zhao
- (China) Zheng Wushuang

=== Withdrawals ===
- (United Kingdom) Harriet Dart → replaced by (Slovakia) Viktória Morvayová
- (Japan) Nao Hibino → replaced by (Japan) Kyōka Okamura
- (Japan) Mai Hontama → replaced by (Chinese Taipei) Liang En-shuo
- Alevtina Ibragimova → replaced by Kristiana Sidorova
- (Japan) Sara Saito → replaced by (Japan) Haruka Kaji
- (China) Tian Fangran → replaced by (China) Yang Yidi
- Mariia Tkacheva → replaced by (China) Ren Yufei
- (China) Zhu Lin → replaced by (China) Shi Han

=== Retirements ===
- (China) Gao Xinyu (neck injury)
- (Canada) Carol Zhao (left thigh injury)

== Doubles main draw entrants ==
=== Seeds ===
| Country | Player | Country | Player | Rank^{1} | Seed |
|---|---|---|---|---|---|
| JPN | Momoko Kobori | JPN | Ayano Shimizu | 199 | 1 |
| INA | Priska Nugroho | THA | Peangtarn Plipuech | 290 | 2 |
| HKG | Eudice Chong | HKG | Cody Wong | 299 | 3 |
| AUS | Alexandra Osborne | CHN | Zheng Wushuang | 351 | 4 |

- Rankings are as of 20 April 2026

=== Other entrants ===
The following pair received wildcards into the doubles main draw:

- (China) Hou Yanan / (China) Zhu Chenting

The following pair received entry into the doubles main draw as an alternate:

- (China) Huang Yujia / Anastasia Zolotareva

=== Withdrawals ===
- (China) Gao Xinyu / (China) Shi Han → replaced by (China) Huang Yujia / Anastasia Zolotareva

== Champions ==
=== Singles ===
- (Chinese Taipei) Liang En-shuo def. (China) You Xiaodi 3–6, 6–4, 6–1

=== Doubles ===
- (Chinese Taipei) Lee Ya-hsin / (China) Ye Qiuyu def. (China) Dang Yiming / (China) You Xiaodi 2–6, 6–2, [11–9]
