= 2017 Jiangxi International Women's Tennis Open – Singles =

Singles
- 2017 Jiangxi International Women's Tennis Open

Final
- Champion: (China) Peng Shuai
- Runner-up: (Japan) Nao Hibino
- Score: 6–3, 6–2

Details
- Draw: 32
- Seeds: 8

Events
Singles	Doubles
- Jiangxi International Women's Tennis Open

Duan Yingying was the defending champion, but lost in the first round to Arina Rodionova.

Peng Shuai won the title, defeating Nao Hibino in the final, 6–3, 6–2.

== Seeds ==
1. (China) Zhang Shuai (first round)
2. (China) Peng Shuai (champion)
3. (Czech Republic) Kristýna Plíšková (second round, retired)
4. (China) Wang Qiang (second round)
5. (China) Duan Yingying (first round)
6. (Serbia) Jelena Janković (second round)
7. (China) Zheng Saisai (first round)
8. (Japan) Risa Ozaki (first round)

== Draw ==
Key

- Q = Qualifier
- WC = Wild card
- LL = Lucky loser
- Alt = Alternate
- ITF = ITF entry
- PR = Protected ranking
- SR = Special ranking
- SE = Special exempt
- JE = Junior exempt
- JR = Junior Accelerator Programme entrant
- CO = College Accelerator Programme entrant
- NG = Next Gen Accelerator Program entrant
- w/o = Walkover
- r = Retired
- d = Defaulted

=== Finals ===
Semifinals
WC	(China) Wang Yafan	0	2
(Japan) Nao Hibino	6	6
(China) Han Xinyun	0	3
2	(China) Peng Shuai	6	6

Final
(Japan) Nao Hibino	3	2
2	(China) Peng Shuai	6	6

=== Top half ===
First round
1	(China) S Zhang	4	7^{8}	4
(Chinese Taipei) K-c Chang	6	6^{6}	6
(Japan) M Kato	1	4
WC	(China) Y Wang	6	6
(China) X Gao	3	6^{4}
(Chinese Taipei) S-w Hsieh	6	7^{7}
Q	(Japan) E Hozumi	2	6	6
7/WC	(China) S Zheng	6	2	0
3	(Czech Republic) Kr Plíšková	6	7^{7}
(South Korea) S-j Jang	3	6^{4}
(Japan) N Hibino	6	3	6
(China) K Zhang	2	6	3
Q	(China) Jin Lu	6	1	7^{8}
(Kazakhstan) Z Diyas	3	6	6^{6}
Q	(China) J Kang	2	5
6	(Serbia) J Janković	6	7

Second round
(Chinese Taipei) K-c Chang	0	2
WC	(China) Y Wang	6	6
(Chinese Taipei) S-w Hsieh	4	6	6
Q	(Japan) E Hozumi	6	3	4
3	(Czech Republic) Kr Plíšková	3^{r}
(Japan) N Hibino	0
Q	(China) Jin Lu	2	6	6
6	(Serbia) J Janković	6	1	2

Quarterfinals
WC	(China) Y Wang	7^{9}	6
(Chinese Taipei) S-w Hsieh	6^{7}	0
(Japan) N Hibino	6	6
Q	(China) Jin Lu	2	3

Semifinals
WC	(China) Y Wang	0	2
(Japan) N Hibino	6	6

=== Bottom half ===
First round
5	(China) Y Duan	5	4
(Australia) Ar Rodionova	7	6
Q	(China) X You	3	6	4
(China) F Liu	6	1	6
LL	(Thailand) P Plipuech	1	6^{6}
(China) X Han	6	7^{8}
Q	(United Kingdom) H Dart	4	1
4	(China) Q Wang	6	6
8	(Japan) R Ozaki	0	5
(China) L Zhu	6	7
Q	(China) F Xun	3	7	6
WC	(China) W Zheng	6	5	2
(Russia) A Kudryavtseva	5	6	4
(Czech Republic) T Martincová	7	2	6
(Japan) K Nara	5	6	3
2	(China) S Peng	7	4	6

Second round
(Australia) Ar Rodionova	6	6
(China) F Liu	4	2
(China) X Han	5	7^{7}	6
4	(China) Q Wang	7	6^{2}	3
(China) L Zhu	6	6
Q	(China) F Xun	3	4
(Czech Republic) T Martincová	2	2^{r}
2	(China) S Peng	6	3

Quarterfinals
(Australia) Ar Rodionova	1	5
(China) X Han	6	7
(China) L Zhu	6^{2}	0
2	(China) S Peng	7^{7}	6

Semifinals
(China) X Han	0	3
2	(China) S Peng	6	6

== Qualifying ==
=== Seeds ===
1. (Thailand) Peangtarn Plipuech (qualifying competition, lucky loser)
2. (Japan) Eri Hozumi (qualified)
3. (China) Gao Xinyu (moved to main draw)
4. (United States) Jacqueline Cako (qualifying competition)
5. (Russia) Ksenia Lykina (first round)
6. (Japan) Riko Sawayanagi (first round)
7. (Japan) Ayano Shimizu (first round)
8. (Japan) Junri Namigata (qualifying competition)
9. (Japan) Shiho Akita (first round, retired)
10. (United Kingdom) Tara Moore (first round)
11. (Japan) Shuko Aoyama (qualifying competition)
12. (China) Xun Fangying (qualified)
13. (China) Lu Jingjing (qualified)

=== Qualifiers ===
1. (China) Xun Fangying
2. (Japan) Eri Hozumi
3. (China) Lu Jingjing
4. (United Kingdom) Harriet Dart
5. (China) Kang Jiaqi
6. (China) You Xiaodi

=== Lucky loser ===
1. (Thailand) Peangtarn Plipuech

=== Draw ===
==== First qualifier ====
First round
1	(Thailand) Peangtarn Plipuech	6	7^{7}
WC	(China) Zhang Ying	4	6^{2}
(Japan) Yuuki Tanaka	4	5
12	(China) Xun Fangying	6	7

Qualifying competition
1	(Thailand) Peangtarn Plipuech	3	6	3
12	(China) Xun Fangying	6	3	6

==== Second qualifier ====
First round
2	(Japan) Eri Hozumi	6	6
Alt	(China) Ye Qiuyu	0	1
(China) Sun Xuliu	3	0
8	(Japan) Junri Namigata	6	6

Qualifying competition
2	(Japan) Eri Hozumi	6	6^{5}	6
8	(Japan) Junri Namigata	2	7^{7}	4

==== Third qualifier ====
First round
13	(China) Lu Jingjing	6	6
(China) Liu Chang	2	2
(China) Lu Jiaxi	3	2
11	(Japan) Shuko Aoyama	6	6

Qualifying competition
13	(China) Lu Jingjing	6	6
11	(Japan) Shuko Aoyama	3	0

==== Fourth qualifier ====
First round
4	(United States) Jacqueline Cako	6	6
(Japan) Makoto Ninomiya	3	2
(United Kingdom) Harriet Dart	7	3
9	(Japan) Shiho Akita	5	2^{r}

Qualifying competition
4	(United States) Jacqueline Cako	6	4	2
(United Kingdom) Harriet Dart	2	6	6

==== Fifth qualifier ====
First round
5	(Russia) Ksenia Lykina	6	3	5
(China) Guo Hanyu	2	6	7
(China) Kang Jiaqi	6	0	6
10	(United Kingdom) Tara Moore	4	6	3

Qualifying competition
(China) Guo Hanyu	6	6^{1}	4
(China) Kang Jiaqi	3	7^{7}	6

==== Sixth qualifier ====
First round
6	(Japan) Riko Sawayanagi	6	2	1
(China) You Xiaodi	3	6	6
(Thailand) Nicha Lertpitaksinchai	6	6
7	(Japan) Ayano Shimizu	4	2

Qualifying competition
(China) You Xiaodi	6	7
(Thailand) Nicha Lertpitaksinchai	1	5
