= 2017 Jiangxi International Women's Tennis Open – Doubles =

Doubles
- 2017 Jiangxi International Women's Tennis Open

Final
- Champion: (China) Jiang Xinyu (China) Tang Qianhui
- Runner-up: (Russia) Alla Kudryavtseva (Australia) Arina Rodionova
- Score: 6–3, 6–2

Details
- Draw: 16
- Seeds: 8

Events
Singles	Doubles
- Jiangxi International Women's Tennis Open

Liang Chen and Lu Jingjing were the defending champions, but chose not to compete together. Lu played alongside You Xiaodi, but lost in the quarterfinals to Liang and Ye Qiuyu. Liang and Ye then lost in the semifinals to Jiang Xinyu and Tang Qianhui.

Jiang and Tang went on to win the title, defeating Alla Kudryavtseva and Arina Rodionova in the final, 6–3, 6–2.

== Seeds ==
1. (Japan) Nao Hibino / (Japan) Miyu Kato (semifinals)
2. (Japan) Shuko Aoyama / (Chinese Taipei) Chang Kai-chen (first round)
3. (Japan) Makoto Ninomiya / (Japan) Kotomi Takahata (quarterfinals)
4. (Russia) Alla Kudryavtseva / (Australia) Arina Rodionova (final)

== Draw ==
Key

- Q = Qualifier
- WC = Wild card
- LL = Lucky loser
- Alt = Alternate
- ITF = ITF entry
- PR = Protected ranking
- SR = Special ranking
- SE = Special exempt
- JE = Junior exempt
- JR = Junior Accelerator Programme entrant
- CO = College Accelerator Programme entrant
- NG = Next Gen Accelerator Program entrant
- w/o = Walkover
- r = Retired
- d = Defaulted

=== Draw ===
First round
1	(Japan) N Hibino (Japan) M Kato	6	2	[10]
(Japan) J Namigata (Japan) R Sawayanagi	2	6	[5]
(Thailand) N Lertpitaksinchai (Thailand) P Plipuech	6	3	[10]
(Japan) E Hozumi (Japan) R Ozaki	4	6	[8]
4	(Russia) A Kudryavtseva (Australia) Ar Rodionova	6	7^{7}
(China) C Liu (China) Jia Lu	4	6^{1}
(China) X Han (China) L Zhu	6	6
(China) Y Wang (China) K Zhang	1	2
(China) X Jiang (China) Q Tang	7^{7}	6
(China) Y Duan (China) Q Wang	6^{4}	2
WC	(China) X Sun (China) W Zheng	2	3
3	(Japan) M Ninomiya (Japan) K Takahata	6	6
(United States) J Cako (Russia) K Lykina	4	3
(China) Jin Lu (China) X You	6	6
(China) C Liang (China) Q Ye	7	6
2	(Japan) S Aoyama (Chinese Taipei) K-c Chang	5	2

Quarterfinals
1	(Japan) N Hibino (Japan) M Kato	6	6
(Thailand) N Lertpitaksinchai (Thailand) P Plipuech	3	2
4	(Russia) A Kudryavtseva (Australia) Ar Rodionova	7	6
(China) X Han (China) L Zhu	5	2
(China) X Jiang (China) Q Tang	7	7
3	(Japan) M Ninomiya (Japan) K Takahata	5	5
(China) Jin Lu (China) X You	3	3
(China) C Liang (China) Q Ye	6	6

Semifinals
1	(Japan) N Hibino (Japan) M Kato	2	1
4	(Russia) A Kudryavtseva (Australia) Ar Rodionova	6	6
(China) X Jiang (China) Q Tang	7^{7}	7
(China) C Liang (China) Q Ye	6^{2}	5

Final
4	(Russia) A Kudryavtseva (Australia) Ar Rodionova	3	2
(China) X Jiang (China) Q Tang	6	6
