= 2017 Jiangxi International Women's Tennis Open =

- Date: July 24–30
- Edition: 4th
- Category: WTA International
- Draw: 32S / 16D
- Prize money: $250,000
- Surface: Hard / outdoor
- Location: Nanchang, China

Champions

Singles
- (China) Peng Shuai

Doubles
- (China) Jiang Xinyu / (China) Tang Qianhui
- Jiangxi International Women's Tennis Open

The 2017 Jiangxi International Women's Tennis Open was a professional women's tennis tournament played on outdoor hard courts. It was the 4th edition of the tournament, and part of the International category of the 2017 WTA Tour. It took place in Nanchang, China, from July 24 through July 30, 2017. Second-seeded Peng Shuai won the singles title.

== Finals ==
=== Singles ===
- (China) Peng Shuai defeated (Japan) Nao Hibino, 6–3, 6–2

=== Doubles ===
- (China) Jiang Xinyu / (China) Tang Qianhui defeated (Russia) Alla Kudryavtseva / (Australia) Arina Rodionova, 6–3, 6–2

== Points and prize money ==
=== Point distribution ===
| Event | W | F | SF | QF | Round of 16 | Round of 32 | Q | Q2 | Q1 |
| Singles | 280 | 180 | 110 | 60 | 30 | 1 | 18 | 12 | 1 |
| Doubles | 280 | 180 | 110 | 60 | 1 | —N/a | —N/a | —N/a | —N/a |

=== Prize money ===
| Event | W | F | SF | QF | Round of 16 | Round of 32 | Q2 | Q1 |
| Singles | $43,000 | $21,400 | $11,500 | $6,175 | $3,400 | $2,100 | $1,020 | $600 |
| Doubles | $12,300 | $6,400 | $3,435 | $1,820 | $960 | —N/a | —N/a | —N/a |

== Singles main draw entrants ==
=== Seeds ===
| Country | Player | Rank^{1} | Seed |
|---|---|---|---|
| CHN | Zhang Shuai | 28 | 1 |
| CHN | Peng Shuai | 30 | 2 |
| CZE | Kristýna Plíšková | 41 | 3 |
| CHN | Wang Qiang | 51 | 4 |
| CHN | Duan Yingying | 63 | 5 |
| SRB | Jelena Janković | 70 | 6 |
| CHN | Zheng Saisai | 71 | 7 |
| JPN | Risa Ozaki | 77 | 8 |

- Rankings are as of July 17, 2017

=== Other entrants ===
The following players received wildcards into the singles main draw:

- (China) Wang Yafan
- (China) Zheng Saisai
- (China) Zheng Wushuang

The following players received entry from the qualifying draw:

- (United Kingdom) Harriet Dart
- (Japan) Eri Hozumi
- (China) Kang Jiaqi
- (China) Lu Jingjing
- (China) Xun Fangying
- (China) You Xiaodi

The following player received entry as a lucky loser:

- (Thailand) Peangtarn Plipuech

=== Withdrawals ===
Before the tournament

- (Romania) Ana Bogdan →replaced by (Thailand) Peangtarn Plipuech
- (Slovakia) Kristína Kučová →replaced by (Russia) Alla Kudryavtseva

=== Retirements ===
- (Czech Republic) Tereza Martincová
- (Czech Republic) Kristýna Plíšková

== Doubles main draw entrants ==
=== Seeds ===
| Country | Player | Country | Player | Rank^{1} | Seed |
|---|---|---|---|---|---|
| JPN | Nao Hibino | JPN | Miyu Kato | 82 | 1 |
| JPN | Shuko Aoyama | TPE | Chang Kai-chen | 149 | 2 |
| JPN | Makoto Ninomiya | JPN | Kotomi Takahata | 169 | 3 |
| RUS | Alla Kudryavtseva | AUS | Arina Rodionova | 182 | 4 |

- Rankings are as of July 17, 2017

=== Other entrants ===
The following pairs received wildcards into the doubles main draw:

- (China) Sun Xuliu / (China) Zheng Wushuang
