= 2023 Jiangxi Open =

- Date: 16–22 October
- Edition: 7th
- Category: WTA 250 tournaments
- Draw: 32S / 16D
- Prize money: $259,303
- Surface: Hard, outdoor
- Location: Nanchang, China
- Venue: Nanchang International Sports Centre

Champions

Singles
- (Czech Republic) Kateřina Siniaková

Doubles
- (Germany) Laura Siegemund / Vera Zvonareva
- Jiangxi Open

The 2023 Jiangxi Open was a women's professional tennis tournament played on outdoor hard courts. It was the 7th edition of the event, and part of the WTA 250 tournaments of the 2023 WTA Tour. It took place in Nanchang, China, from 16 to 22 October 2023. This was the first edition of the tournament held since 2019, as the intervening editions were canceled due to the COVID-19 pandemic in China.

== Finals ==
=== Singles ===
- (Czech Republic) Kateřina Siniaková defeated (Czech Republic) Marie Bouzková, 1–6, 7–6^{(7–5)}, 7–6^{(7–4)}

=== Doubles ===
- (Germany) Laura Siegemund / Vera Zvonareva defeated (Japan) Eri Hozumi / (Japan) Makoto Ninomiya 6–4, 6–2

== Point distribution ==
Event	W	F	SF	QF	Round of 16	Round of 32	Q	Q2	Q1
Singles	280	180	110	60	30	1	18	12	1
Doubles	280	180	110	60	1	—N/a	—N/a	—N/a	—N/a

== Singles main draw entrants ==
=== Seeds ===
Country	Player	Rank^{1}	Seed
BRA	Beatriz Haddad Maia	20	1
POL	Magda Linette	23	2
CZE	Marie Bouzková	29	3
CHN	Wang Xinyu	32	4
CHN	Zhu Lin	35	5
	Anna Blinkova	37	6
FRA	Varvara Gracheva	46	7
ESP	Sara Sorribes Tormo	57	8

- Rankings are as of 9 October 2023.

=== Other entrants ===
The following players received wildcards into the singles main draw:

- (China) Guo Hanyu
- (China) Jiang Xinyu
- (China) Wang Yuhan

The following player received entry using a protected ranking:

- Vera Zvonareva

The following players received entry from the qualifying draw:

- (China) Ma Yexin
- (Liechtenstein) Kathinka von Deichmann
- (China) Wei Sijia
- (China) You Xiaodi

The following players received entry as lucky losers:

- Amina Anshba
- (Norway) Ulrikke Eikeri

=== Withdrawals ===
- (Italy) Elisabetta Cocciaretto → replaced by (Slovakia) Viktória Hrunčáková
- (Ukraine) Marta Kostyuk → replaced by (Japan) Nao Hibino
- Veronika Kudermetova → replaced by Vera Zvonareva
- (Czech Republic) Linda Nosková → replaced by (Australia) Kimberly Birrell
- (United States) Bernarda Pera → replaced by Valeria Savinykh
- (Kazakhstan) Yulia Putintseva → replaced by (Germany) Laura Siegemund
- Liudmila Samsonova → replaced by (Slovenia) Kaja Juvan
- (Egypt) Mayar Sherif → replaced by (Czech Republic) Kateřina Siniaková
- (China) Wang Xiyu → replaced by (Norway) Ulrikke Eikeri

== Doubles main draw entrants ==
=== Seeds ===
Country	Player	Country	Player	Rank^{1}	Seed
~~CAN~~	~~Gabriela Dabrowski~~	~~NZL~~	~~Erin Routliffe~~	~~27~~	~~1~~
GER	Laura Siegemund		Vera Zvonareva	32	1
SVK	Tereza Mihalíková	CHN	Xu Yifan	91	3
JPN	Eri Hozumi	JPN	Makoto Ninomiya	111	4
	Lidziya Marozava	POL	Katarzyna Piter	132	5

- Rankings are as of 9 October 2023

=== Other entrants ===
The following pairs received wildcards into the doubles main draw:

- (China) Dang Yiming / (China) Xun Fangying
- (China) Ma Yexin / (China) Wei Sijia

The following pair received entry as alternates:

- Kamilla Rakhimova / Aliaksandra Sasnovich

=== Withdrawals ===
- (Canada) Gabriela Dabrowski / (New Zealand) Erin Routliffe → replaced by Kamilla Rakhimova / Aliaksandra Sasnovich
