= 2019 Jiangxi International Women's Tennis Open =

- Date: September 9 – 15
- Edition: 6th
- Category: WTA International
- Draw: 32S/16D
- Prize money: $250,000
- Surface: Hard
- Location: Nanchang, China

Champions

Singles
- (Sweden) Rebecca Peterson

Doubles
- (China) Wang Xinyu / (China) Zhu Lin
← 2018 ·	Jiangxi International Women's Tennis Open	· 2023 →

The 2019 Jiangxi International Women's Tennis Open was a professional tennis tournament played on hard courts. It was the 6th edition of the event, and part of the International category of the 2019 WTA Tour. It took place in Nanchang, China, from September 9 – 15, 2019.

== Points and prize money ==
=== Point distribution ===
Event	W	F	SF	QF	Round of 16	Round of 32	Q	Q2	Q1
Singles	280	180	110	60	30	1	18	12	1
Doubles	280	180	110	60	1	—	—	—	—

=== Prize money ===
Event	W	F	SF	QF	Round of 16	Round of 32	Q2	Q1
Singles	$43,000	$21,400	$11,500	$6,175	$3,400	$2,100	$1,020	$600
Doubles	$12,300	$6,400	$3,435	$1,820	$960	—	—	—

== Singles main draw entrants ==
=== Seeds ===
Country	Player	Rank^{1}	Seed
CHN	Zhang Shuai	34	1
CHN	Wang Yafan	50	2
POL	Magda Linette	53	3
KAZ	Elena Rybakina	69	4
SWE	Rebecca Peterson	71	5
SUI	Viktorija Golubic	75	6
UKR	Kateryna Kozlova	76	7
CZE	Kristýna Plíšková	86	8

- Rankings are as of August 26, 2019

=== Other entrants ===
The following players received wildcards into the singles main draw:

- (China) Gao Xinyu
- (China) Liu Fangzhou
- (China) Xun Fangying

The following players received entry from the qualifying draw:

- (Hungary) Gréta Arn
- (Romania) Jaqueline Cristian
- (Kazakhstan) Anna Danilina
- (Croatia) Jana Fett
- (Mexico) Giuliana Olmos
- (Thailand) Peangtarn Plipuech

=== Withdrawals ===
Before the tournament

- (Hungary) Tímea Babos → replaced by (Slovenia) Dalila Jakupović
- (Germany) Mona Barthel → replaced by (Australia) Samantha Stosur
- (Romania) Irina-Camelia Begu → replaced by (Italy) Sara Errani
- (Canada) Eugenie Bouchard → replaced by (Serbia) Nina Stojanović
- (Czech Republic) Marie Bouzková → replaced by (China) Wang Xinyu
- (Serbia) Ivana Jorović → replaced by (Spain) Lara Arruabarrena
- (Russia) Svetlana Kuznetsova → replaced by (China) Peng Shuai
- (Slovakia) Viktória Kužmová → replaced by (India) Ankita Raina

=== Retirements ===
- (Romania) Monica Niculescu (left knee injury)
- (China) Zhang Shuai (dizziness)

== Doubles main draw entrants ==
=== Seeds ===
Country	Player	Country	Player	Rank^{1}	Seed
SRB	Aleksandra Krunić	BLR	Lidziya Marozava	105	1
CHN	Peng Shuai	CHN	Zhang Shuai	120	2
SLO	Dalila Jakupović	AUS	Jessica Moore	144	3
CHI	Alexa Guarachi	MEX	Giuliana Olmos	156	4

- Rankings are as of August 26, 2019

=== Other entrants ===
The following pairs received wildcards into the doubles main draw:

- (China) Jiang Xinyu / (China) Tang Qianhui
- (China) Sun Xuliu / (China) Zheng Wushuang

The following pair received entry as alternates:

- (Thailand) Peangtarn Plipuech / (China) Xun Fangying

=== Withdrawals ===
Before the tournament

- (Romania) Monica Niculescu (left knee injury)

== Champions ==
=== Singles ===
- (Sweden) Rebecca Peterson def. (Kazakhstan) Elena Rybakina, 6–2, 6–0

=== Doubles ===
- (China) Wang Xinyu / (China) Zhu Lin def. (China) Peng Shuai / (China) Zhang Shuai, 6–2, 7–6^{(7–5)}
