= 2026 Jiangxi Open – Doubles =

Doubles
- 2026 Jiangxi Open

Final
- Champions: (Chinese Taipei) Lee Ya-hsin (China) Ye Qiuyu
- Runners-up: (China) Dang Yiming (China) You Xiaodi
- Score: 2–6, 6–2, [11–9]

Details
- Draw: 16
- Seeds: 4

Events
Singles	Doubles
- Jiangxi Open

Quinn Gleason and Elena Pridankina were the reigning champions, but Gleason did not participate this year and Pridankina chose to compete in Istanbul instead.

Lee Ya-hsin and Ye Qiuyu won the title, defeating Dang Yiming and You Xiaodi 2–6, 6–2, [11–9] in the final.

== Seeds ==
1. (Japan) Momoko Kobori / (Japan) Ayano Shimizu (semifinals)
2. (Indonesia) Priska Nugroho / (Thailand) Peangtarn Plipuech (first round)
3. (Hong Kong) Eudice Chong / (Hong Kong) Cody Wong (first round)
4. (Australia) Alexandra Osborne / (China) Zheng Wushuang (quarterfinals)

== Draw ==
Key

- Q = Qualifier
- WC = Wild card
- LL = Lucky loser
- Alt = Alternate
- ITF = ITF entry
- PR = Protected ranking
- SR = Special ranking
- SE = Special exempt
- JE = Junior exempt
- JR = Junior Accelerator Programme entrant
- CO = College Accelerator Programme entrant
- NG = Next Gen Accelerator Program entrant
- w/o = Walkover
- r = Retired
- d = Defaulted

=== Draw ===
First round
1	(Japan) M Kobori (Japan) A Shimizu	6	6
(China) Y Ma (Thailand) M Sawangkaew	3	4
(Australia) E Micic (Japan) E Shimizu	6	6
(Italy) J Pieri (Italy) D Spiteri	2	3
3	(Hong Kong) E Chong (Hong Kong) C Wong	1	4
(China) Y Dang (China) X You	6	6
Alt	(China) Y Huang; A Zolotareva	4	6	[3]
(Australia) L Cabrera (United Kingdom) H Watson	6	3	[10]
(Japan) N Kawaguchi (Japan) H Kuwata	6^{5}	4
(Australia) G Da Silva-Fick (Australia) T McGiffin	7^{7}	6
WC	(China) Y Hou (China) C Zhu	1	2
4	(Australia) A Osborne (China) W Zheng	6	6
S Lansere; V Panshina	6^{4}	2
(Chinese Taipei) Y-y Li (China) Z Li	7^{7}	6
(Chinese Taipei) Y-hsi Lee (China) Q Ye	6	6
2	(Indonesia) P Nugroho (Thailand) P Plipuech	4	3

Quarterfinals
1	(Japan) M Kobori (Japan) A Shimizu	4	7^{7}	[10]
(Australia) E Micic (Japan) E Shimizu	6	6^{5}	[8]
(China) Y Dang (China) X You	6	6
(Australia) L Cabrera (United Kingdom) H Watson	3	2
(Australia) G Da Silva-Fick (Australia) T McGiffin	7	6
4	(Australia) A Osborne (China) W Zheng	5	1
(Chinese Taipei) Y-y Li (China) Z Li	4	5
(Chinese Taipei) Y-hsi Lee (China) Q Ye	6	7

Semifinals
1	(Japan) M Kobori (Japan) A Shimizu	5	6	[5]
(China) Y Dang (China) X You	7	2	[10]
(Australia) G Da Silva-Fick (Australia) T McGiffin	2	2
(Chinese Taipei) Y-hsi Lee (China) Q Ye	6	6

Final
(China) Y Dang (China) X You	6	2	[9]
(Chinese Taipei) Y-hsi Lee (China) Q Ye	2	6	[11]
