= 2023 Jiangxi Open – Doubles =

Doubles
- 2023 Jiangxi Open

Final
- Champions: (Germany) Laura Siegemund; Vera Zvonareva
- Runners-up: (Japan) Eri Hozumi (Japan) Makoto Ninomiya
- Score: 6–4, 6–2

Events
| Singles | Doubles |
| ← 2019 · | Jiangxi Open | · 2024 → |

Laura Siegemund and Vera Zvonareva defeated Eri Hozumi and Makoto Ninomiya in the final, 6–4, 6–2 to win the doubles tennis title at the 2023 Jiangxi Open. With the win, Siegemund and Zvonareva qualified for the WTA Finals, and Siegemund debuted in the top ten of the WTA doubles rankings.

Wang Xinyu and Zhu Lin were the reigning champions from when the event was last held in 2019, but chose not to participate this year.

== Seeds ==
1. (Canada) Gabriela Dabrowski / (New Zealand) Erin Routliffe (withdrew)
2. (Germany) Laura Siegemund / Vera Zvonareva (champions)
3. (Slovakia) Tereza Mihalíková / (China) Xu Yifan (quarterfinals)
4. (Japan) Eri Hozumi / (Japan) Makoto Ninomiya (final)
5. Lidziya Marozava / (Poland) Katarzyna Piter (first round)

== Draw ==
=== Key ===
- Q = Qualifier
- WC = Wild card
- LL = Lucky loser
- Alt = Alternate
- SE = Special exempt
- PR = Protected ranking
- ITF = ITF entry
- JE = Junior exempt
- w/o = Walkover
- r = Retired
- d = Defaulted
- SR = Special ranking

=== Draw ===
First round
5 | L Marozava (Poland) K Piter | 6 | 4 | [4]
(Australia) K Birrell (Norway) U Eikeri | 3 | 6 | [10]
(China) H Guo (China) X Jiang | 6 | 7
A Anshba (Czech Republic) A Dețiuc | 3 | 5
4 | (Japan) E Hozumi (Japan) M Ninomiya | 7^{7} | 6
WC | (China) Y Dang (China) F Xun | 6^{4} | 2
(Netherlands) A Hartono (Australia) O Tjandramulia | 4 | 4
(Colombia) C Osorio; D Shnaider | 6 | 6
(Japan) N Hibino (Georgia (country)) O Kalashnikova | 3 | 2
Alt | K Rakhimova; A Sasnovich | 6 | 6
(China) S Feng (China) W Zheng | 5 | 4
3 | (Slovakia) T Mihalíková (China) Y Xu | 7 | 6
WC | (China) Y Ma (China) S Wei | 7^{7} | 3 | [6]
(Thailand) L Kumkhum (Thailand) P Plipuech | 6^{5} | 6 | [10]
(Indonesia) J Rompies (India) P Thombare | 3 | 5
2 | (Germany) L Siegemund; V Zvonareva | 6 | 7

Quarterfinals
(Australia) K Birrell (Norway) U Eikeri | 3 | 2
(China) H Guo (China) X Jiang | 6 | 6
4 | (Japan) E Hozumi (Japan) M Ninomiya | 6 | 1 | [10]
(Colombia) C Osorio; D Shnaider | 2 | 6 | [7]
Alt | K Rakhimova; A Sasnovich | 6 | 6
3 | (Slovakia) T Mihalíková (China) Y Xu | 4 | 4
(Thailand) L Kumkhum (Thailand) P Plipuech | 3 | 6^{5}
2 | (Germany) L Siegemund; V Zvonareva | 6 | 7^{7}

Semifinals
(China) H Guo (China) X Jiang | 4 | 3
4 | (Japan) E Hozumi (Japan) M Ninomiya | 6 | 6
Alt | K Rakhimova; A Sasnovich | 1 | 7^{8} | [4]
2 | (Germany) L Siegemund; V Zvonareva | 6 | 6^{6} | [10]

Final
4 | (Japan) E Hozumi (Japan) M Ninomiya | 4 | 2
2 | (Germany) L Siegemund; V Zvonareva | 6 | 6
