= 2026 Jiangxi Open – Singles =

Singles
- 2026 Jiangxi Open

Final
- Champion: (Chinese Taipei) Liang En-shuo
- Runner-up: (China) You Xiaodi
- Score: 3–6, 6–4, 6–1

Details
- Draw: 32 (4Q / 4WC)
- Seeds: 8

Events
Singles	Doubles
- Jiangxi Open

Anna Blinkova was the reigning champion, but did not participate this year.

Liang En-shuo won the title, defeating You Xiaodi 3–6, 6–4, 6–1 in the final.

== Seeds ==
1. (Thailand) Lanlana Tararudee (quarterfinals)
2. (Australia) Taylah Preston (second round)
3. (China) Ma Yexin (first round)
4. (Thailand) Mananchaya Sawangkaew (first round)
5. (China) You Xiaodi (final)
6. (Japan) Aoi Ito (first round)
7. (China) Gao Xinyu (first round, retired)
8. Anastasia Zolotareva (first round)

== Draw ==
Key

- Q = Qualifier
- WC = Wild card
- LL = Lucky loser
- Alt = Alternate
- ITF = ITF entry
- PR = Protected ranking
- SR = Special ranking
- SE = Special exempt
- JE = Junior exempt
- JR = Junior Accelerator Programme entrant
- CO = College Accelerator Programme entrant
- NG = Next Gen Accelerator Program entrant
- w/o = Walkover
- r = Retired
- d = Defaulted

=== Finals ===
Semifinals
WC	(China) Yao Xinxin	5	2
5	(China) You Xiaodi	7	6
(China) Bai Zhuoxuan	6^{6}	5
(Chinese Taipei) Liang En-shuo	7^{8}	7

Final
5	(China) You Xiaodi	6	4	1
(Chinese Taipei) Liang En-shuo	3	6	6

=== Top half ===
First round
1	(Thailand) L Tararudee	7	6
S Lansere	5	1
(Italy) J Pieri	1	1
(China) H Shi	6	6
Q	(Hong Kong) C Wong	2	1
WC	(China) X Yao	6	6
(Japan) H Kaji	7^{7}	4
7/WC	(China) X Gao	6^{2}	1^{r}
4	(Thailand) M Sawangkaew	0	5
(United Kingdom) H Watson	6	7
(Italy) D Spiteri	3	1
(Japan) K Okamura	6	6
(China) Y Yang	2	6	3
Q	(Canada) C Zhao	6	3	6
WC	(China) Jiaq Wang	1	4
5	(China) X You	6	6

Second round
1	(Thailand) L Tararudee	6	6
(China) H Shi	3	3
WC	(China) X Yao	6	6
(Japan) H Kaji	4	3
(United Kingdom) H Watson	6	6
(Japan) K Okamura	3	4
Q	(Canada) C Zhao	2	1^{r}
5	(China) X You	6	4

Quarterfinals
1	(Thailand) L Tararudee	4	4
WC	(China) X Yao	6	6
(United Kingdom) H Watson	4	3
5	(China) X You	6	6

Semifinals
WC	(China) X Yao	5	2
5	(China) X You	7	6

=== Bottom half ===
First round
6	(Japan) A Ito	1	6	3
(Australia) L Cabrera	6	3	6
Q	(China) Z Li	6	6
Q	(China) W Zheng	4	4
(China) Z Bai	6	3	6
WC	(China) Jia Lu	2	6	1
(Slovakia) V Morvayová	6	5	7^{9}
3	(China) Y Ma	2	7	6^{7}
8	A Zolotareva	3	3
(Japan) M Yamaguchi	6	6
(Japan) H Kinoshita	6	6
K Sidorova	4	2
(Chinese Taipei) E-s Liang	6	6
(China) Y Ren	3	0
(Australia) E Micic	3	2
2	(Australia) T Preston	6	6

Second round
(Australia) L Cabrera	6	6^{5}	6
Q	(China) Z Li	3	7^{7}	1
(China) Z Bai	6	6
(Slovakia) V Morvayová	2	3
(Japan) M Yamaguchi	4	1
(Japan) H Kinoshita	6	6
(Chinese Taipei) E-s Liang	7^{7}	3	6
2	(Australia) T Preston	6^{5}	6	1

Quarterfinals
(Australia) L Cabrera	4	2
(China) Z Bai	6	6
(Japan) H Kinoshita	3	3
(Chinese Taipei) E-s Liang	6	6

Semifinals
(China) Z Bai	6^{6}	5
(Chinese Taipei) E-s Liang	7^{8}	7

== Qualifying ==
=== Seeds ===
1. (Indonesia) Priska Nugroho (qualifying competition)
2. (Canada) Carol Zhao (qualified)
3. (China) Zheng Wushuang (qualified)
4. Varvara Panshina (qualifying competition)
5. (China) Li Zongyu (qualified)
6. (China) Zhu Chenting (qualifying competition)
7. (China) Yuan Chengyiyi (first round)
8. (United States) Amy Zhu (first round)

=== Qualifiers ===
1. (China) Li Zongyu
2. (Canada) Carol Zhao
3. (China) Zheng Wushuang
4. (Hong Kong) Cody Wong

=== Qualifying draw ===
==== First qualifier ====
First round				Qualifying competition
				1	(Indonesia) Priska Nugroho	4	4
				5	(China) Li Zongyu	6	6
	(China) Dang Yiming	4	2	5	(China) Li Zongyu	6	6
5	(China) Li Zongyu	6	6

==== Second qualifier ====
First round				Qualifying competition
				2	(Canada) Carol Zhao	2	6	6
					(Thailand) Peangtarn Plipuech	6	3	3
	(Thailand) Peangtarn Plipuech	6	7		(Thailand) Peangtarn Plipuech	6	3	3
8	(United States) Amy Zhu	4	5

==== Third qualifier ====
First round				Qualifying competition
				3	(China) Zheng Wushuang	6	6
				6	(China) Zhu Chenting	4	4
	(China) Ye Qiuyu	0	2	6	(China) Zhu Chenting	4	4
6	(China) Zhu Chenting	6	6

==== Fourth qualifier ====
First round				Qualifying competition
				4	Varvara Panshina	6	2	2
					(Hong Kong) Cody Wong	4	6	6
	(Hong Kong) Cody Wong	6	6		(Hong Kong) Cody Wong	4	6	6
7	(China) Yuan Chengyiyi	0	2
