= 2026 ATX Open – Singles =

Singles
- 2026 ATX Open

Final
- Champion: (United States) Peyton Stearns
- Runner-up: (United States) Taylor Townsend
- Score: 7–6^{(10–8)}, 7–5

Details
- Draw: 32
- Seeds: 8

Events
Singles	Doubles
- ATX Open

Peyton Stearns defeated Taylor Townsend in the final, 7–6^{(10–8)}, 7–5 to win the singles tennis title at the 2026 ATX Open. It was her second WTA Tour title.

Jessica Pegula was the reigning champion, but withdrew before her first-round match due to a left-knee injury.

== Seeds ==
1. (United States) Jessica Pegula (withdrew)
2. (United States) Iva Jovic (second round)
3. (China) Wang Xinyu (first round)
4. (United States) Peyton Stearns (champion)
5. (France) Varvara Gracheva (withdrew)
6. (Hungary) Anna Bondár (first round)
7. (United States) Caty McNally (first round)
8. (Croatia) Petra Marčinko (first round)

== Draw ==
Key

- Q = Qualifier
- WC = Wild card
- LL = Lucky loser
- Alt = Alternate
- ITF = ITF entry
- PR = Protected ranking
- SR = Special ranking
- SE = Special exempt
- JE = Junior exempt
- JR = Junior Accelerator Programme entrant
- CO = College Accelerator Programme entrant
- NG = Next Gen Accelerator Program entrant
- w/o = Walkover
- r = Retired
- d = Defaulted

=== Finals ===
Semifinals
(United States) Ashlyn Krueger	6^{6}	3
WC	(United States) Taylor Townsend	7^{8}	6
4	(United States) Peyton Stearns	6	3	6
(Australia) Kimberly Birrell	3	6	2

Final
WC	(United States) Taylor Townsend	6^{8}	5
4	(United States) Peyton Stearns	7^{10}	7

=== Top half ===
First round
LL	(China) Y Yuan	4	7	6
(Slovakia) R Šramková	6	5	1
WC	(Canada) B Andreescu	3	7	4
(Hungary) D Gálfi	6	5	6
A Zakharova	3	6	6
WC	(United States) M Stoiana	6	2	4
(United States) A Krueger	6	7^{7}
7	(United States) C McNally	1	6^{5}
3	(China) Xin Wang	3	2
Q	(Switzerland) R Masarova	6	6
Q	(United States) E Mandlik	6	3	1
Q	(United States) W Osuigwe	2	6	6
(United States) K Volynets	4	5
Q	(Czech Republic) N Bartůňková	6	7
WC	(United States) T Townsend	4	7^{7}	7
LL	(Czech Republic) L Fruhvirtová	6	6^{3}	5

Second round
LL	(China) Y Yuan	6	6
(Hungary) D Gálfi	3	2
A Zakharova	5	3
(United States) A Krueger	7	6
Q	(Switzerland) R Masarova	7^{7}	6
Q	(United States) W Osuigwe	6^{2}	3
Q	(Czech Republic) N Bartůňková	1	4
WC	(United States) T Townsend	6	6

Quarterfinals
LL	(China) Y Yuan	6^{5}	4
(United States) A Krueger	7^{7}	6
Q	(Switzerland) R Masarova	7	2	2
WC	(United States) T Townsend	5	6	6

Semifinals
(United States) A Krueger	6^{6}	3
WC	(United States) T Townsend	7^{8}	6

=== Bottom half ===
First round
6	(Hungary) A Bondár	3	5
(Uzbekistan) K Rakhimova	6	7
(United States) A Parks	4	6	3
O Selekhmeteva	6	3	6
(Slovenia) K Juvan	6	7^{7}
Q	(United States) C Liu	4	6^{1}
(United Kingdom) F Jones	6	3	2
4	(United States) P Stearns	3	6	6
8	(Croatia) P Marčinko	6	3	4
(Australia) K Birrell	0	6	6
(New Zealand) L Sun	2	3
Q	(United States) C Dolehide	6	6
WC	(United States) V Williams	4	1
(Australia) A Tomljanović	6	6
A Blinkova	3	4
2	(United States) I Jovic	6	6

Second round
(Uzbekistan) K Rakhimova	2	5
O Selekhmeteva	6	7
(Slovenia) K Juvan	0	2
4	(United States) P Stearns	6	6
(Australia) K Birrell	6	6
Q	(United States) C Dolehide	4	2
(Australia) A Tomljanović	4	6	6
2	(United States) I Jovic	6	4	4

Quarterfinals
O Selekhmeteva	1	7	5
4	(United States) P Stearns	6	5	7
(Australia) K Birrell	6	6
(Australia) A Tomljanović	3	3

Semifinals
4	(United States) P Stearns	6	3	6
(Australia) K Birrell	3	6	2

== Qualifying ==
=== Seeds ===
1. (Czech Republic) Nikola Bartůňková (qualified)
2. (Switzerland) Rebeka Masarova (qualified)
3. (Czech Republic) Linda Fruhvirtová (qualifying competition, lucky loser)
4. (United States) Caroline Dolehide (qualified)
5. (China) Yuan Yue (qualifying competition, lucky loser)
6. (Chinese Taipei) Joanna Garland (qualifying competition)
7. (Japan) Himeno Sakatsume (first round)
8. (United States) Whitney Osuigwe (qualified)
9. (United States) Elizabeth Mandlik (qualified)
10. (United States) Louisa Chirico (qualifying competition)
11. (United States) Kayla Day (first round)
12. (Japan) Nao Hibino (qualifying competition)

=== Qualifiers ===
1. (Czech Republic) Nikola Bartůňková
2. (Switzerland) Rebeka Masarova
3. (United States) Elizabeth Mandlik
4. (United States) Caroline Dolehide
5. (United States) Whitney Osuigwe
6. (United States) Claire Liu

=== Lucky losers ===
1. (Czech Republic) Linda Fruhvirtová
2. (China) Yuan Yue

=== Qualifying draw ===
==== First qualifier ====
First round
1	(Czech Republic) Nikola Bartůňková	6	6
Mariia Tkacheva	1	1
(United Kingdom) Emily Appleton	6^{2}	2
10	(United States) Louisa Chirico	7^{7}	6

Qualifying competition
1	(Czech Republic) Nikola Bartůňková	6	6
10	(United States) Louisa Chirico	2	3

==== Second qualifier ====
First round
2	(Switzerland) Rebeka Masarova	6	6
(Poland) Gina Feistel	2	4
PR	(United States) Madison Brengle	6	6
11	(United States) Kayla Day	2	4

Qualifying competition
2	(Switzerland) Rebeka Masarova	3	6	6
PR	(United States) Madison Brengle	6	3	4

==== Third qualifier ====
First round
3	(Czech Republic) Linda Fruhvirtová	6	7
(United States) Anna Rogers	0	5
PR	(United States) Jennifer Brady	3	6	4
9	(United States) Elizabeth Mandlik	6	4	6

Qualifying competition
3	(Czech Republic) Linda Fruhvirtová	3	1
9	(United States) Elizabeth Mandlik	6	6

==== Fourth qualifier ====
First round
4	(United States) Caroline Dolehide	6	4	6
(Japan) Ena Shibahara	2	6	4
(Romania) Gabriela Lee	4	1
12	(Japan) Nao Hibino	6	6

Qualifying competition
4	(United States) Caroline Dolehide	6	6
12	(Japan) Nao Hibino	1	1

==== Fifth qualifier ====
First round
5	(China) Yuan Yue	6	6
WC	(United States) Nadia Elle Valdez	0	0
WC	(Romania) Carmen Andreea Herea	2	1
8	(United States) Whitney Osuigwe	6	6

Qualifying competition
5	(China) Yuan Yue	4	3
8	(United States) Whitney Osuigwe	6	6

==== Sixth qualifier ====
First round
6	(Chinese Taipei) Joanna Garland	6	6
(China) You Xiaodi	2	3
(United States) Claire Liu	6	5	6
7	(Japan) Himeno Sakatsume	3	7	3

Qualifying competition
6	(Chinese Taipei) Joanna Garland	3	2
(United States) Claire Liu	6	6
