= 2023 Jiangxi Open – Singles =

Singles
- 2023 Jiangxi Open

Final
- Champion: (Czech Republic) Kateřina Siniaková
- Runner-up: (Czech Republic) Marie Bouzková
- Score: 1–6, 7–6^{(7–5)}, 7–6^{(7–4)}

Details
- Draw: 32
- Seeds: 8

Events
Singles	Doubles
← 2019 ·	Jiangxi Open	· 2024 →

Kateřina Siniaková defeated Marie Bouzková in the final, 1–6, 7–6^{(7–5)}, 7–6^{(7–4)} to win the singles tennis title at the 2023 Jiangxi Open. She saved three championship points en route to her fifth WTA Tour singles title.

Rebecca Peterson was the reigning champion from when the event was last held in 2019, but did not participate this year.

== Seeds ==
1. (Brazil) Beatriz Haddad Maia (first round)
2. (Poland) Magda Linette (first round)
3. (Czech Republic) Marie Bouzková (final)
4. (China) Wang Xinyu (first round)
5. (China) Zhu Lin (first round)
6. Anna Blinkova (first round)
7. (France) Varvara Gracheva (second round)
8. (Spain) Sara Sorribes Tormo (second round)

== Draw ==
=== Key ===
- Q = Qualifier
- WC = Wild card
- LL = Lucky loser
- Alt = Alternate
- SE = Special exempt
- PR = Protected ranking
- ITF = ITF entry
- JE = Junior exempt
- w/o = Walkover
- r = Retired
- d = Defaulted
- SR = Special ranking

=== Finals ===
Semifinals
Diana Shnaider	6^{5}	2
3	(Czech Republic) Marie Bouzková	7^{7}	6
(Czech Republic) Kateřina Siniaková	7	6
(Canada) Leylah Fernandez	5	4

Final
3	(Czech Republic) Marie Bouzková	6	6^{5}	6^{4}
(Czech Republic) Kateřina Siniaková	1	7^{7}	7^{7}

=== Top half ===
First round
1	(Brazil) B Haddad Maia	6^{2}	3
(Japan) N Hibino	7^{7}	6
Q	(China) S Wei	5	5
(Australia) K Birrell	7	7
PR	V Zvonareva	6	6
(Netherlands) A Hartono	1	2
D Shnaider	6	6
5	(China) L Zhu	4	0
3	(Czech Republic) M Bouzková	6	6
Q	(Liechtenstein) K von Deichmann	1	1
E Avanesyan	6	6^{4}	4
LL	A Anshba	2	7^{7}	6
(Colombia) C Osorio	6	6
Q	(China) Y Ma	1	0
WC	(China) X Jiang	4	0
8	(Spain) S Sorribes Tormo	6	6

Second round
(Japan) N Hibino	6	7
(Australia) K Birrell	3	5
PR	V Zvonareva	3	1^{r}
D Shnaider	6	0
3	(Czech Republic) M Bouzková	7	6
LL	A Anshba	5	0
(Colombia) C Osorio	6	7
8	(Spain) S Sorribes Tormo	4	5

Quarterfinals
(Japan) N Hibino	0	5
D Shnaider	6	7
3	(Czech Republic) M Bouzková	6	6
(Colombia) C Osorio	0	4

Semifinals
D Shnaider	6^{5}	2
3	(Czech Republic) M Bouzková	7^{7}	6

=== Bottom half ===
First round
7	(France) V Gracheva	6	6
K Rakhimova	3	4
WC	(China) Yu Wang	3	3
(Czech Republic) K Siniaková	6	6
LL	(Norway) U Eikeri	6	1
(Slovenia) K Juvan	2	2^{r}
(Germany) L Siegemund	6	7
4	(China) Xin Wang	1	5
6	A Blinkova	1	1
Q	(China) X You	6	6
(Canada) L Fernandez	6	6
WC	(China) H Guo	1	3
(Slovakia) V Hrunčáková	1	3
A Sasnovich	6	6
V Savinykh	7	3	7^{7}
2	(Poland) M Linette	5	6	6^{3}

Second round
7	(France) V Gracheva	4	3
(Czech Republic) K Siniaková	6	6
LL	(Norway) U Eikeri	1	3
(Germany) L Siegemund	6	6
Q	(China) X You	4	1
(Canada) L Fernandez	6	6
A Sasnovich	6	6
V Savinykh	3	2

Quarterfinals
(Czech Republic) K Siniaková	w/o
(Germany) L Siegemund
(Canada) L Fernandez	6	6
A Sasnovich	3	4

Semifinals
(Czech Republic) K Siniaková	7	6
(Canada) L Fernandez	5	4

== Qualifying ==
=== Seeds ===
1. (China) You Xiaodi (qualified)
2. (China) Ma Yexin (qualified)
3. (China) Wei Sijia (qualified)
4. (Liechtenstein) Kathinka von Deichmann (qualified)
5. Amina Anshba (qualifying competition, lucky loser)
6. (Norway) Ulrikke Eikeri (qualifying competition, lucky loser)
7. (China) Xun Fangying (first round)
8. (China) Dang Yiming (first round)

=== Qualifiers ===
1. (China) You Xiaodi
2. (China) Ma Yexin
3. (China) Wei Sijia
4. (Liechtenstein) Kathinka von Deichmann

=== Lucky losers ===
1. Amina Anshba
2. (Norway) Ulrikke Eikeri

=== Qualifying draw ===
==== First qualifier ====
First round				Qualifying competition
				1	(China) You Xiaodi	6	6
					(Indonesia) Jessy Rompies	3	1
	(Indonesia) Jessy Rompies	6	7		(Indonesia) Jessy Rompies	3	1
8	(China) Dang Yiming	3	5

==== Second qualifier ====
First round				Qualifying competition
				2	(China) Ma Yexin	5	6	6
				Alt	(Slovakia) Tereza Mihalíková	7	2	0
Alt	(Slovakia) Tereza Mihalíková	6	6	Alt	(Slovakia) Tereza Mihalíková	7	2	0
7	(China) Xun Fangying	2	3

==== Third qualifier ====
First round				Qualifying competition
				3	(China) Wei Sijia	6	6
				5	Amina Anshba	3	3
	(Czech Republic) Anastasia Dețiuc	3	3	5	Amina Anshba	3	3
5	Amina Anshba	6	6

==== Fourth qualifier ====
First round
4	(Liechtenstein) Kathinka von Deichmann	6	6
(India) Prarthana Thombare	1	0
(China) Hou Yanan	2	6^{1}
6	(Norway) Ulrikke Eikeri	6	7^{7}

Qualifying competition
4	(Liechtenstein) Kathinka von Deichmann	6	7
6	(Norway) Ulrikke Eikeri	3	5
