= 2026 ATX Open =

- Date: 23 February – 1 March
- Edition: 4th
- Category: WTA 250
- Draw: 32S / 24Q / 16D
- Prize money: $283,347
- Surface: Hard (Outdoor)
- Location: Austin, Texas, United States
- Venue: Westwood Country Club

Champions

Singles
- (United States) Peyton Stearns

Doubles
- (Australia) Storm Hunter / (United States) Taylor Townsend
- ATX Open

The 2026 ATX Open was a tournament for female professional tennis players played on outdoor hard courts. It was the fourth edition of the event, a WTA 250 tournament on the 2026 WTA Tour. The event took place at The Westwood Country Club in Austin, United States, from 23 February through 1 March 2026.

== Champions ==
=== Singles ===
- (United States) Peyton Stearns def. (United States) Taylor Townsend, 7–6^{(10–8)}, 7–5

=== Doubles ===
- (Australia) Storm Hunter / (United States) Taylor Townsend def. (Hong Kong) Eudice Chong / (Chinese Taipei) Liang En-shuo, 6–3, 6–4

== Singles main draw entrants ==
=== Seeds ===
Country	Player	Rank^{1}	Seed
~~USA~~	~~Jessica Pegula~~	~~5~~	~~1~~
USA	Iva Jovic	20	2
CHN	Wang Xinyu	33	3
USA	Peyton Stearns	58	4
~~FRA~~	~~Varvara Gracheva~~	~~60~~	~~5~~
HUN	Anna Bondár	65	6
USA	Caty McNally	68	7
CRO	Petra Marčinko	69	8

- Rankings as of 16 February 2026.

=== Other entrants ===
The following players received wildcards into the singles main draw:

- (Canada) Bianca Andreescu
- (United States) Mary Stoiana
- (United States) Taylor Townsend
- (United States) Venus Williams

The following players received entry from the qualifying draw:

- (Czech Republic) Nikola Bartůňková
- (United States) Caroline Dolehide
- (United States) Claire Liu
- (United States) Elizabeth Mandlik
- (Switzerland) Rebeka Masarova
- (United States) Whitney Osuigwe

The following players received entry as a lucky loser:

- (Czech Republic) Linda Fruhvirtová
- (China) Yuan Yue

=== Withdrawals ===
- (France) Varvara Gracheva → replaced by (Czech Republic) Linda Fruhvirtová (LL)
- (United States) McCartney Kessler → replaced by (Slovenia) Kaja Juvan
- (Germany) Eva Lys → replaced by (United States) Alycia Parks
- (United States) Jessica Pegula → replaced by (China) Yuan Yue (LL)
- (Argentina) Solana Sierra → replaced by Oksana Selekhmeteva

== Doubles main draw entrants ==
=== Seeds ===
Country	Player	Country	Player	Rank^{†}	Seed
AUS	Storm Hunter	USA	Taylor Townsend	29	1
JPN	Shuko Aoyama	JPN	Ena Shibahara	119	2
HKG	Eudice Chong	TPE	Liang En-shuo	164	3
AUS	Kimberly Birrell	USA	Caty McNally	169	4

- ^{1} Rankings as of 16 February 2026.
