= 2026 ATX Open – Doubles =

Doubles
- 2026 ATX Open

Final
- Champions: (Australia) Storm Hunter (United States) Taylor Townsend
- Runners-up: (Hong Kong) Eudice Chong (Chinese Taipei) Liang En-shuo
- Score: 6–3, 6–4

Details
- Draw: 16
- Seeds: 4

Events
Singles	Doubles
- ATX Open

Storm Hunter and Taylor Townsend defeated Eudice Chong and Liang En-shuo in the final, 6–3, 6–4 to win the doubles tennis title at the 2026 ATX Open. It was the tenth WTA Tour doubles title for Hunter and twelfth for Townsend, and they did not lose a set en route.

Anna Blinkova and Yuan Yue were the reigning champions, but Yuan did not participate this year. Blinkova partnered Petra Marčinko, but lost in the first round to Chong and Liang.

== Seeds ==
1. (Australia) Storm Hunter / (United States) Taylor Townsend (champions)
2. (Japan) Shuko Aoyama / (Japan) Ena Shibahara (semifinals)
3. (Hong Kong) Eudice Chong / (Chinese Taipei) Liang En-shuo (final)
4. (Australia) Kimberly Birrell / (United States) Caty McNally (semifinals)

== Draw ==
Key

- Q = Qualifier
- WC = Wild card
- LL = Lucky loser
- Alt = Alternate
- ITF = ITF entry
- PR = Protected ranking
- SR = Special ranking
- SE = Special exempt
- JE = Junior exempt
- JR = Junior Accelerator Programme entrant
- CO = College Accelerator Programme entrant
- NG = Next Gen Accelerator Program entrant
- w/o = Walkover
- r = Retired
- d = Defaulted

=== Draw ===
First round
1	(Australia) S Hunter (United States) T Townsend	6	7^{7}
(United States) P Stearns (United States) V Williams	2	6^{5}
O Selekhmeteva; A Zakharova	6	6
(China) Xin Wang (China) S Zheng	3	4
4	(Australia) K Birrell (United States) C McNally	6	7^{7}
(United States) I Jovic (United States) M Stoiana	3	6^{3}
(United States) C Harrison (United States) D Hewitt	2	6	[10]
(Hungary) A Bondár (Hungary) D Gálfi	6	3	[8]
(Japan) N Kawaguchi (Chinese Taipei) Y-h Lee	4	4
(United Kingdom) E Appleton (Chile) A Guarachi	6	6
A Blinkova (Croatia) P Marčinko	7^{8}	2	[5]
3	(Hong Kong) E Chong (Chinese Taipei) E-s Liang	6^{6}	6	[10]
(Japan) M Ayukawa (Japan) K Morisaki	0
(United States) C Corley (United States) I Corley	0^{r}
(United States) A Krueger (Hungary) F Stollár	6^{1}	6^{3}
2	(Japan) S Aoyama (Japan) E Shibahara	7^{7}	7^{7}

Quarterfinals
1	(Australia) S Hunter (United States) T Townsend	6	6
O Selekhmeteva; A Zakharova	2	0
4	(Australia) K Birrell (United States) C McNally	6	7
(United States) C Harrison (United States) D Hewitt	4	5
(United Kingdom) E Appleton (Chile) A Guarachi	0	1
3	(Hong Kong) E Chong (Chinese Taipei) E-s Liang	6	6
(Japan) M Ayukawa (Japan) K Morisaki	3	3
2	(Japan) S Aoyama (Japan) E Shibahara	6	6

Semifinals
1	(Australia) S Hunter (United States) T Townsend	7	6
4	(Australia) K Birrell (United States) C McNally	5	4
3	(Hong Kong) E Chong (Chinese Taipei) E-s Liang	4	7^{7}	[10]
2	(Japan) S Aoyama (Japan) E Shibahara	6	6^{3}	[6]

Final
1	(Australia) S Hunter (United States) T Townsend	6	6
3	(Hong Kong) E Chong (Chinese Taipei) E-s Liang	3	4
