= Jeong Su-nam =

South Korean tennis player

Jeong Su-nam 정수남
- Country (sports): South Korea
- Born: 6 June 1996 (age 30)
- Plays: Right (two-handed backhand)
- Prize money: $49,251

Singles
- Career record: 166–86
- Career titles: 7 ITF
- Highest ranking: No. 357 (29 May 2017)
- Current ranking: No. 1,215 (26 October 2026)

Doubles
- Career record: 31–47
- Career titles: 1 ITF
- Highest ranking: No. 829 (30 December 2019)
- Last updated on: 1 November 2026.

- Jeong Su-nam
- Hangul: 정수남
- RR: Jeong Sunam
- MR: Chŏng Sunam

Jeong Su-nam (Korean: 정수남; born 6 June 1996) is a South Korean female tennis player.

She has career-high WTA rankings of 357 in singles, achieved on 29 May 2017, and 829 in doubles, reached in 2019. In her career, she has won seven singles titles and one doubles title on the ITF Women's Circuit.

Jeong made her WTA Tour main-draw debut at the 2017 Korea Open, after receiving a wildcard into the doubles tournament alongside Park Sang-hee.

Playing for the South Korea Fed Cup team, she has a win-loss record of 3–3.

== ITF finals ==
=== Singles: 9 (7 titles, 2 runner-ups) ===
Legend $25,000 tournaments $15,000 tournaments $10,000 tournaments	Finals by surface Hard (7–2)

Result	W–L	Date	Tournament	Tier	Surface	Opponent	Score
Win	1–0	May 2016	Incheon Open, South Korea	25,000	Hard	(South Korea) Han Na-lae	6–4, 4–6, 6–4
Win	2–0	Jul 2016	ITF Gimcheon, South Korea	10,000	Hard	(United States) Hanna Chang	4–6, 6–2, 6–3
Win	3–0	Jun 2017	ITF Sangju, South Korea	15,000	Hard	(South Korea) Choi Ji-hee	6–2, 6–3
Win	4–0	Jun 2017	ITF Gimcheon, South Korea	15,000	Hard	(South Korea) Choi Ji-hee	6–3, 3–6, 6–2
Win	5–0	Jun 2017	ITF Gimcheon, South Korea	15,000	Hard	(South Korea) Han Sung-hee	6–3, 6–1
Win	6–0	Sep 2018	ITF Yeongwol, South Korea	15,000	Hard	(South Korea) Lee So-ra	6–2, 6–1
Loss	6–1	Jun 2019	ITF Gimcheon, South Korea	15,000	Hard	(Japan) Shiori Fukuda	2–6, 6–4, 5–7
Loss	6–2	Dec 2019	ITF Navi Mumbai, India	25,000	Hard	(Austria) Barbara Haas	6–4, 2–6, 6–7^{(2–7)}
Win	7–2	Sep 2022	ITF Yeongwol, South Korea	15,000	Hard	(Belgium) Clara Vlasselaer	6–4, 6–1

=== Doubles: 2 (1 title, 1 runner-up) ===
Result	No.	Date	Tournament	Tier	Surface	Partner	Opponents	Score
Win	1–0	Sep 2019	ITF Yeongwol, Korea	W15	Hard	(South Korea) Kim Na-ri	(Japan) Rina Saigo (Japan) Yukina Saigo	6–4, 6–3
Loss	1–1	Sep 2024	ITF Yeongwol, Korea	W15	Hard	(China) Ye Qiuyu	(Chinese Taipei) Lee Ya-hsin (Chinese Taipei) Lin Fang-an	4–6, 7–6^{(6)}, [6–10]
