= Dang Yiming =

Chinese tennis player (born 2004)

Dang Yiming 党一鸣
- Country (sports): China
- Born: 30 August 2004 (age 22) Hubei, China
- Prize money: $51,227

Singles
- Career record: 55–83
- Highest ranking: No. 702 (13 July 2026)
- Current ranking: No. 912 (16 November 2026)

Doubles
- Career record: 54–58
- Career titles: 3 ITF
- Highest ranking: No. 183 (12 October 2026)
- Current ranking: No. 184 (16 November 2026)
- Last updated on: 18 November 2026.

Dang Yiming (Chinese: 党一鸣; pinyin: Dǎng yī míng; born 30 August 2004) is a Chinese tennis player. She has a career-high doubles ranking by the WTA of No. 183, achieved on 12 October 2026.

== Career ==
In September 2023, partnering with Yang Yidi, Dang made her WTA Tour main-draw debut in the doubles event at the 2023 Ningbo Open as an alternate. A month later, partnering with compatriot Xun Fangying, she had another main-draw appearance in the doubles event of the 2023 Jiangxi Open, after receiving a wildcard entry.

In November 2025, she and fellow Chinese player You Xiaodi won the women's doubles at the W50 event Keio Challenger, defeating Japanese duo Natsumi Kawaguchi and Hayu Kinoshita in the final. This championship is her first W50 title.

In March 2026, she reached the doubles final of the W75 event in Kōfu, Japan.

In May 2026, teaming with You Xiaodi, Dang lost her first career WTA 125 doubles final at the 2026 Jiangxi Open, falling to Lee Ya-hsin and Ye Qiuyu.

In September 2026, at the WTA 250 tournament 2026 SP Open, Dang and her partner You Xiaodi were defeated in the semifinals by Gabriela Dabrowski and Luisa Stefani.

== WTA 125 finals ==
=== Doubles: 1 (runner-up) ===
Result	W–L	Date	Tournament	Surface	Partner	Opponents	Score
Loss	0–1	May 2026	Jiangxi Open, China	Hard	(China) You Xiaodi	(Chinese Taipei) Lee Ya-hsin (China) Ye Qiuyu	6–2, 2–6, [9–11]

== ITF Circuit finals ==
=== Doubles: 7 (3 titles, 4 runner-ups) ===
Legend W75 tournaments W50 tournaments W25/35 tournaments W15 tournaments	Finals by surface Hard (1–3) Clay (2–1)

Result	W–L	Date	Tournament	Tier	Surface	Partner	Opponents	Score
Loss	0–1	Jul 2023	ITF Naiman, China	W25	Hard	(China) You Xiaodi	(China) Feng Shuo (China) Wu Meixu	6–1, 3–6, [5–10]
Loss	0–2	Jun 2024	ITF Hong Kong, China SAR	W15	Hard	Anastasia Zolotareva	(Japan) Hiromi Abe (Japan) Saki Imamura	4–6, 1–6
Win	1–2	Jul 2025	ITF Rio Claro, Brazil	W35	Clay	(China) You Xiaodi	(Brazil) Luiza Fullana (Argentina) Carla Markus	6–1, 6–2
Loss	1–3	Jul 2025	ITF São Paulo, Brazil	W35	Clay	(China) You Xiaodi	(Mexico) Marian Gómez Pezuela Cano (Peru) Lucciana Pérez	walkover
Win	2–3	Nov 2025	Yokohama Challenger, Japan	W50	Hard	(China) You Xiaodi	(Japan) Natsumi Kawaguchi (Japan) Hayu Kinoshita	6–2, 3–6, [10–4]
Win	3–3	Jan 2026	ITF Weston, United States	W35	Clay	(China) You Xiaodi	(United States) Hanna Chang (United States) Victoria Hu	6–3, 2–6, [10–8]
Loss	3–4	Mar 2026	Kōfu International Open, Japan	W75	Hard	(China) You Xiaodi	(Japan) Momoko Kobori (Japan) Ayano Shimizu	4–6, 4–6
