= 2019 Jiangxi International Women's Tennis Open – Singles =

Singles
- 2019 Jiangxi International Women's Tennis Open

Final
- Champion: (Sweden) Rebecca Peterson
- Runner-up: (Kazakhstan) Elena Rybakina
- Score: 6–2, 6–0

Details
- Draw: 32
- Seeds: 8

Events
Singles	Doubles
- Jiangxi International Women's Tennis Open

Wang Qiang was the defending champion, but chose not to participate this year.

Rebecca Peterson won her first WTA singles title, defeating Elena Rybakina in the final, 6–2, 6–0.

== Seeds ==
1. (China) Zhang Shuai (second round, retired)
2. (China) Wang Yafan (first round)
3. (Poland) Magda Linette (quarterfinals)
4. (Kazakhstan) Elena Rybakina (final)
5. (Sweden) Rebecca Peterson (champion)
6. (Switzerland) Viktorija Golubic (quarterfinals)
7. (Ukraine) Kateryna Kozlova (quarterfinals)
8. (Czech Republic) Kristýna Plíšková (second round)

== Draw ==
Key

- Q = Qualifier
- WC = Wild card
- LL = Lucky loser
- Alt = Alternate
- ITF = ITF entry
- PR = Protected ranking
- SR = Special ranking
- SE = Special exempt
- JE = Junior exempt
- JR = Junior Accelerator Programme entrant
- CO = College Accelerator Programme entrant
- NG = Next Gen Accelerator Program entrant
- w/o = Walkover
- r = Retired
- d = Defaulted

=== Finals ===
Semifinals
(China) Peng Shuai	1	6	2
4	(Kazakhstan) Elena Rybakina	6	3	6
5	(Sweden) Rebecca Peterson	6	6
(Serbia) Nina Stojanović	3	1

Final
4	(Kazakhstan) Elena Rybakina	2	0
5	(Sweden) Rebecca Peterson	6	6

=== Top half ===
First round
1	(China) S Zhang	6	6
(Serbia) A Krunić	3	3
(China) L Zhu	6	6
Q	(Thailand) P Plipuech	2	2
(Spain) P Badosa	4	2
(China) S Peng	6	6
(Switzerland) S Vögele	5	3
8	(Czech Republic) Kr Plíšková	7	6
4	(Kazakhstan) E Rybakina	6	4	6
(India) A Raina	2	6	3
WC	(China) X Gao	7	0	5
(China) Xin Wang	5	6	7
(Romania) M Niculescu	6	3	1^{r}
(Spain) L Arruabarrena	1	6	4
Q	(Romania) J Cristian	3	2
6	(Switzerland) V Golubic	6	6

Second round
1	(China) S Zhang	0	0^{r}
(China) L Zhu	6	1
(China) S Peng	6	0	6
8	(Czech Republic) Kr Plíšková	3	6	4
4	(Kazakhstan) E Rybakina	7^{7}	6
(China) Xin Wang	6^{4}	2
(Spain) L Arruabarrena	6	0	3
6	(Switzerland) V Golubic	1	6	6

Quarterfinals
(China) L Zhu	4	6^{5}
(China) S Peng	6	7^{7}
4	(Kazakhstan) E Rybakina	6	3	7
6	(Switzerland) V Golubic	4	6	5

Semifinals
(China) S Peng	1	6	2
4	(Kazakhstan) E Rybakina	6	3	6

=== Bottom half ===
First round
5	(Sweden) R Peterson	6	6
WC	(China) F Xun	0	3
(Ukraine) K Zavatska	6^{3}	6	1
Q	(Croatia) J Fett	7^{7}	2	6
Q	(Kazakhstan) A Danilina	3	6	5
WC	(China) F Liu	6	2	7
Q	(Mexico) G Olmos	3	2
3	(Poland) M Linette	6	6
7	(Ukraine) K Kozlova	6	6
Q	(Hungary) G Arn	2	1
(Slovenia) D Jakupović	6	6
(Italy) S Errani	1	1
(Australia) S Stosur	7^{8}	6
(Australia) Ar Rodionova	6^{6}	3
(Serbia) N Stojanović	6	6
2	(China) Y Wang	2	4

Second round
5	(Sweden) R Peterson	7^{7}	6
Q	(Croatia) J Fett	6^{1}	4
WC	(China) F Liu	2	3
3	(Poland) M Linette	6	6
7	(Ukraine) K Kozlova	6	6
(Slovenia) D Jakupović	2	2
(Australia) S Stosur	4	3
(Serbia) N Stojanović	6	6

Quarterfinals
5	(Sweden) R Peterson	6	6^{3}	7^{7}
3	(Poland) M Linette	3	7^{7}	6^{5}
7	(Ukraine) K Kozlova	7^{7}	4	4
(Serbia) N Stojanović	6^{5}	6	6

Semifinals
5	(Sweden) R Peterson	6	6
(Serbia) N Stojanović	3	1

== Qualifying ==
=== Seeds ===
1. (Romania) Jaqueline Cristian (qualified)
2. (China) Xu Shilin (first round)
3. (China) Ma Shuyue (first round)
4. (Australia) Kaylah McPhee (qualifying competition)
5. (Australia) Jaimee Fourlis (first round)
6. (Poland) Urszula Radwańska (qualifying competition)
7. (Croatia) Jana Fett (qualified)
8. (Thailand) Peangtarn Plipuech (qualified)
9. (Hungary) Gréta Arn (qualified)
10. (Kazakhstan) Anna Danilina (qualified)
11. (Mexico) Giuliana Olmos (qualified)
12. (China) Sun Ziyue (qualifying competition)

=== Qualifiers ===
1. (Romania) Jaqueline Cristian
2. (Mexico) Giuliana Olmos
3. (Thailand) Peangtarn Plipuech
4. (Hungary) Gréta Arn
5. (Croatia) Jana Fett
6. (Kazakhstan) Anna Danilina

=== Draw ===
==== First qualifier ====
First round
1	(Romania) Jaqueline Cristian	7	6
WC	(China) Zheng Wushuang	5	0
(United States) Jacqueline Cako	1	0
12	(China) Sun Ziyue	6	6

Qualifying competition
1	(Romania) Jaqueline Cristian	6	6
12	(China) Sun Ziyue	3	3

==== Second qualifier ====
First round
2	(China) Xu Shilin	4	4
(United Kingdom) Emily Webley-Smith	6	6
(United Kingdom) Eden Silva	4	3
11	(Mexico) Giuliana Olmos	6	6

Qualifying competition
(United Kingdom) Emily Webley-Smith	1	5
11	(Mexico) Giuliana Olmos	6	7

==== Third qualifier ====
First round
3	(China) Ma Shuyue	4	4
WC	(China) Yang Yidi	6	6
(China) Sun Xuliu	4	2
8	(Thailand) Peangtarn Plipuech	6	6

Qualifying competition
WC	(China) Yang Yidi	2	6	2
8	(Thailand) Peangtarn Plipuech	6	1	6

==== Fourth qualifier ====
First round
4	(Australia) Kaylah McPhee	6	7
(Japan) Mana Ayukawa	1	5
WC	(China) Zhang Ying	2	2
9	(Hungary) Gréta Arn	6	6

Qualifying competition
4	(Australia) Kaylah McPhee	6^{0}	6^{8}
9	(Hungary) Gréta Arn	7^{7}	7^{10}

==== Fifth qualifier ====
First round
5	(Australia) Jaimee Fourlis	6	5	4
(Indonesia) Aldila Sutjiadi	4	7	6
(Georgia (country)) Sofia Shapatava	4	2
7	(Croatia) Jana Fett	6	6

Qualifying competition
(Indonesia) Aldila Sutjiadi	2	4
7	(Croatia) Jana Fett	6	6

==== Sixth qualifier ====
First round
6	(Poland) Urszula Radwańska	7^{7}	6
(Chile) Alexa Guarachi	6^{2}	2
WC	(China) Guo Shanshan	5	6	4
10	(Kazakhstan) Anna Danilina	7	2	6

Qualifying competition
6	(Poland) Urszula Radwańska	7	2	3
10	(Kazakhstan) Anna Danilina	5	6	6
