= Tenika McGiffin =

Australian tennis player

- Country (sports): Australia
- Born: February 23, 1999 (age 27) Brisbane, Australia
- Plays: Right (two-handed backhand)
- College: Tennessee Lady Volunteers (2017-2022)
- Prize money: $31,721

Singles
- Career record: 37–53
- Highest ranking: No. 897 (March 4, 2024)
- Current ranking: No. 1,446 (September 28, 2026)

Doubles
- Career record: 92–61
- Career titles: 5 ITF
- Highest ranking: No. 169 (September 14, 2026)
- Current ranking: No. 172 (September 28, 2026)
- Last updated on: September 29, 2026.

Tenika McGiffin (born February 23, 1999) is an Australian tennis player. She has a career-high doubles ranking by the WTA of No. 169, achieved on 14 September 2026.

== Early life ==
McGiffin was born in Brisbane, Australia, in 1999. Coming from a family of athletes, Tenika's mother, Leisa, is a former volleyball player, and her father, Peter McGiffin, is an Australian Cricket coach and former player. Her brother, Steve McGiffin, is an Australian cricketer. Between 2017 and 2022, she pursued her college education in the United States and played for the Tennessee Lady Volunteers.

== Career ==
In July 2026, partnering with Gabriella Da Silva-Fick, McGiffin won the W50 event held in Darmstadt, Germany defeating Sandra Samir and Joëlle Steur in the final. She won the first major championship of her career.

== ITF Circuit finals ==
=== Doubles: 17 (5 titles, 12 runner-ups) ===
Legend W75 tournaments (0–3) W50 tournaments (1–1) W35 tournaments (2–6) W15 tournaments (2–2)	Finals by surface Hard (3–11) Clay (2–0) Carpet (0–1)

Result	W–L	Date	Tournament	Tier	Surface	Partner	Opponents	Score
Loss	0–1	Feb 2024	Traralgon International, Australia	W35	Hard	(Australia) Destanee Aiava	(Japan) Yuki Naito (Japan) Naho Sato	1–6, 3–6
Loss	0–2	Jun 2024	ITF Los Angeles, United States	W15	Hard	(Australia) Lily Fairclough	(Ukraine) Anita Sahdiieva (Australia) Stefani Webb	5–7, 6–4, [6–10]
Win	1–2	Aug 2024	ITF Huntsville, United States	W15	Clay	(United States) Carly Briggs	(United States) Karina Miller (Norway) Emily Sartz-Lunde	6–3, 7–6^{(3)}
Loss	1–3	Sep 2024	ITF Cairns, Australia	W35	Hard (i)	(United States) Mia Horvit	(Australia) Petra Hule (Australia) Alana Parnaby	2–6, 2–6
Win	2–3	Jul 2025	ITF Monastir, Tunisia	W35	Hard	(Latvia) Elza Tomase	(South Korea) Back Da-yeon (India) Vaidehi Chaudhari	3–6, 6–3, [10–8]
Win	3–3	Aug 2025	ITF Monastir, Tunisia	W15	Hard	(Latvia) Elza Tomase	(Italy) Martina Lo Pumo (Canada) Anna Tabunshchyk	6–2, 6–1
Loss	3–4	Aug 2025	ITF Vigo, Spain	W35	Hard	(United States) Carol Young Suh Lee	(Netherlands) Joy de Zeeuw (Czech Republic) Vendula Valdmannová	5–7, 2–6
Loss	3–5	Sep 2025	ITF Kayseri, Turkiye	W15	Hard	(United Kingdom) Esther Adeshina	(United States) Savannah Broadus (Belgium) Kaat Coppez	4–6, 6–4, [10–12]
Loss	3–6	Oct 2025	Brisbane QTC International, Australia	W35	Hard	(Japan) Naho Sato	(Chinese Taipei) Lee Ya-hsin (Chinese Taipei) Lin Fang-an	7–6^{(6)}, 4–6, [8–10]
Loss	3–7	Oct 2025	Brisbane QTC International, Australia	W35	Hard	(Japan) Naho Sato	(New Zealand) Monique Barry (Japan) Natsumi Kawaguchi	5–7, 3–6
Loss	3–8	Nov 2025	Queensland International 3, Australia	W50	Hard	(Australia) Gabriella Da Silva-Fick	(Australia) Destanee Aiava (Australia) Maddison Inglis	6–7^{(3)}, 6–7^{(7)}
Loss	3–9	Feb 2026	Queensland International 2, Australia	W75	Hard	(Australia) Gabriella Da Silva-Fick	(Japan) Natsumi Kawaguchi (Japan) Sara Saito	2–6, 4–6
Win	4–9	Feb 2026	Burnie International, Australia	W35	Hard	(Australia) Gabriella Da Silva-Fick	(New Zealand) Monique Barry (Australia) Alexandra Osborne	6–4, 6–3
Loss	4–10	Mar 2026	Launceston International, Australia	W35	Hard	(Australia) Gabriella Da Silva-Fick	(Japan) Kyōka Okamura (Japan) Naho Sato	7–5, 5–7, [12–14]
Loss	4–11	Apr 2026	ITF Calvi, France	W75	Hard	(Czech Republic) Michaela Bayerlová	(Czech Republic) Aneta Kučmová (Czech Republic) Aneta Laboutková	4–6, 6–3, [3–10]
Loss	4–12	May 2026	Kurume Cup, Japan	W75	Carpet	(Australia) Gabriella Da Silva-Fick	(Chinese Taipei) Lee Ya-hsin (China) Ye Qiuyu	3–6, 2–6
Win	5–12	Jul 2026	ITF Darmstadt, Germany	W50	Clay	(Australia) Gabriella Da Silva-Fick	(Egypt) Sandra Samir (Germany) Joëlle Steur	7–5, 7–6^{(4)}
