= 2019 Jiangxi International Women's Tennis Open – Doubles =

Doubles
- 2019 Jiangxi International Women's Tennis Open

Final
- Champions: (China) Wang Xinyu (China) Zhu Lin
- Runners-up: (China) Peng Shuai (China) Zhang Shuai
- Score: 6–2, 7–6^{(7–5)}

Details
- Draw: 16
- Seeds: 8

Events
Singles	Doubles
- Jiangxi International Women's Tennis Open

Jiang Xinyu and Tang Qianhui were the two-time defending champions, but lost in the semifinals to Peng Shuai and Zhang Shuai.

Wang Xinyu and Zhu Lin won the title, defeating Peng and Zhang in the final, 6–2, 7–6^{(7–5)}.

== Seeds ==
1. (Serbia) Aleksandra Krunić / (Belarus) Lidziya Marozava (first round)
2. (China) Peng Shuai / (China) Zhang Shuai (final)
3. (Slovenia) Dalila Jakupović / (Australia) Jessica Moore (semifinals)
4. (Chile) Alexa Guarachi / (Mexico) Giuliana Olmos (first round)

== Draw ==
Key

- Q = Qualifier
- WC = Wild card
- LL = Lucky loser
- Alt = Alternate
- ITF = ITF entry
- PR = Protected ranking
- SR = Special ranking
- SE = Special exempt
- JE = Junior exempt
- JR = Junior Accelerator Programme entrant
- CO = College Accelerator Programme entrant
- NG = Next Gen Accelerator Program entrant
- w/o = Walkover
- r = Retired
- d = Defaulted

=== Draw ===
First round
1	(Serbia) A Krunić (Belarus) L Marozava	7^{7}	0	[4]
(China) Xin Wang (China) L Zhu	6^{5}	6	[10]
(Australia) Ar Rodionova (United States) S Santamaria	4	6	[10]
(Russia) N Dzalamidze (Kazakhstan) E Rybakina	6	0	[2]
3	(Slovenia) D Jakupović (Australia) J Moore	6	6
WC	(China) X Sun (China) W Zheng	4	3
(United States) J Cako (United States) I Neel	3	3
(Georgia (country)) S Shapatava (United Kingdom) E Webley-Smith	6	6
WC	(China) X Jiang (China) Q Tang	6	2	[10]
(Switzerland) V Golubic (Sweden) R Peterson	2	6	[8]
(Kazakhstan) A Danilina (France) E Lechemia	6	4	[10]
4	(Chile) A Guarachi (Mexico) G Olmos	3	6	[7]
(India) A Raina (United Kingdom) E Silva	6	6
Alt	(Thailand) P Plipuech (China) F Xun	3	3
(Indonesia) B Gumulya (Netherlands) R van der Hoek	6^{5}	2
2	(China) S Peng (China) S Zhang	7^{7}	6

Quarterfinals
(China) Xin Wang (China) L Zhu	3	6	[10]
(Australia) Ar Rodionova (United States) S Santamaria	6	2	[3]
3	(Slovenia) D Jakupović (Australia) J Moore	6	6
(Georgia (country)) S Shapatava (United Kingdom) E Webley-Smith	4	3
WC	(China) X Jiang (China) Q Tang	6	6
(Kazakhstan) A Danilina (France) E Lechemia	2	4
(India) A Raina (United Kingdom) E Silva	2	7^{10}	[3]
2	(China) S Peng (China) S Zhang	6	6^{8}	[10]

Semifinals
(China) Xin Wang (China) L Zhu	6	4	[10]
3	(Slovenia) D Jakupović (Australia) J Moore	2	6	[7]
WC	(China) X Jiang (China) Q Tang	1	2
2	(China) S Peng (China) S Zhang	6	6

Final
(China) Xin Wang (China) L Zhu	6	7^{7}
2	(China) S Peng (China) S Zhang	2	6^{5}
