= Lee Ya-hsin =

Taiwanese tennis player

- Country (sports): Chinese Taipei
- Born: 10 April 2001 (age 25)
- Plays: Left (two-handed backhand)
- Prize money: $24,752

Singles
- Career record: 69–49
- Highest ranking: No. 931 (12 August 2019)

Doubles
- Career record: 106–51
- Career titles: 13 ITF
- Highest ranking: No. 321 (26 May 2025)
- Current ranking: No. 332 (27 October 2025)
- Last updated on: 1 November 2025.

Lee Ya-hsin (born 10 April 2001) is a Taiwanese professional tennis player. On 26 May 2025, she reached her career-high doubles ranking of world No. 321. She has won 13 doubles titles on the ITF Circuit. She also reached her best singles ranking of No. 931 on 12 August 2019.

Lee won her first major ITF title at the W50 doubles tournament in Fuzhou, China.

== WTA Challenger finals ==
=== Doubles: 2 (1 title, 1 runner-up) ===
Result	W–L	Date	Tournament	Surface	Partner	Opponents	Score
Loss	0–1	Sep 2025	Jingshan Open, China	Hard	(Hong Kong) Cody Wong	(Hong Kong) Eudice Chong (Chinese Taipei) Liang En-shuo	6–7^{(4–7)}, 2–6
Win	1–1	May 2026	Jiangxi, China	Hard	(China) Ye Qiuyu	(China) Dang Yiming (China) You Xiaodi	2–6, 6–2, [11–9]

== ITF Circuit finals ==
=== Doubles: 25 (17 titles, 8 runner-ups) ===
Legend W100 tournaments (0–2) W75 tournaments (1–1) W50 tournaments (1–1) W25/35 tournaments (4–4) W15 tournaments (11–0)	Finals by surface Hard (16–6) Clay (0–2) Carpet (1–0)

Result	W–L	Date	Tournament	Tier	Surface	Partner	Opponents	Score
Win	1–0	Feb 2022	ITF Sharm El Sheikh, Egypt	W15	Hard	(Chinese Taipei) Lee Pei-chi	(Finland) Laura Hietaranta (Greece) Michaela Laki	6–2, 3–6, [10–7]
Win	2–0	Mar 2022	ITF Sharm El Sheikh	W15	Hard	(Chinese Taipei) Lee Pei-chi	Polina Iatcenko; Darya Shauha	6–3, 6–0
Win	3–0	Sep 2022	ITF Monastir, Tunisia	W15	Hard	(Chinese Taipei) Tsao Chia-yi	(Poland) Emilia Durska (Italy) Camilla Zanolini	7–6^{(6)}, 6–4
Win	4–0	Sep 2022	ITF Monastir, Tunisia	W15	Hard	(Chinese Taipei) Tsao Chia-yi	(United Kingdom) Abigail Amos (United States) Jaeda Daniel	6–0, 6–1
Win	5–0	Oct 2022	ITF Monastir, Tunisia	W15	Hard	(Chinese Taipei) Tsao Chia-yi	(Indonesia) Priska Madelyn Nugroho (China) Wei Sijia	1–6, 6–1, [10–3]
Win	6–0	Oct 2022	ITF Monastir, Tunisia	W15	Hard	(Chinese Taipei) Tsao Chia-yi	(France) Flavie Brugnone (Netherlands) Stéphanie Visscher	6–4, 6–0
Win	7–0	Oct 2022	ITF Monastir, Tunisia	W15	Hard	(Chinese Taipei) Tsao Chia-yi	(Belgium) Hanne Vandewinkel (Slovakia) Radka Zelníčková	6–2, 6–4
Win	8–0	Jan 2023	ITF Monastir, Tunisia	W15	Hard	(China) Yang Yidi	(Switzerland) Nadine Keller (Chinese Taipei) Tsao Chia-yi	2–6, 6–3, [15–13]
Win	9–0	Feb 2023	ITF Monastir, Tunisia	W15	Hard	(China) Liu Fangzhou	(Chile) Fernanda Labraña (Serbia) Elena Milovanović	6–3, 7–6^{(12)}
Loss	9–1	Jun 2023	ITF Tainan, Taiwan	W25	Clay	(Chinese Taipei) Lee Ya-hsuan	(Belgium) Sofia Costoulas (Chinese Taipei) Li Yu-yun	4–6, 4–6
Loss	9–2	Jun 2023	ITF Tainan, Taiwan	W25	Clay	(New Zealand) Monique Barry	(Chinese Taipei) Tsao Chia-yi (Chinese Taipei) Yang Ya-yi	2–6, 2–6
Win	10–2	Feb 2024	ITF Nakhon Si Thammarat, Thailand	W15	Hard	(Hong Kong) Cody Wong	(China) Yao Xinxin (China) Zheng Wushuang	6–3, 7–5
Win	11–2	Aug 2024	ITF Kunshan, China	W35	Hard	(Hong Kong) Cody Wong	(Chinese Taipei) Li Yu-yun (China) Yao Xinxin	7–5, 6–4
Win	12–2	Sep 2024	ITF Fuzhou, China	W50	Hard	(Chinese Taipei) Lin Fang-an	(Chinese Taipei) Cho I-hsuan (Chinese Taipei) Cho Yi-tsen	6–3, 6–4
Win	13–2	Sep 2024	ITF Yeongwol, South Korea	W15	Hard	(Chinese Taipei) Lin Fang-an	(South Korea) Jeong Su-nam (China) Ye Qiuyu	6–4, 6–7^{(6)}, [10–6]
Loss	13–3	May 2025	ITF Changwon, South Korea	W35	Hard	(Hong Kong) Cody Wong	(Japan) Hiromi Abe (Japan) Ikumi Yamazaki	4–6, 2–6
Win	14–3	Oct 2025	Brisbane QTC Tennis International, Australia	W35	Hard	(Chinese Taipei) Lin Fang-an	(Japan) Naho Sato (Australia) Tenika McGiffin	6–7^{(6)}, 6–4, [10–8]
Loss	14–4	Nov 2025	Takasaki Open, Japan	W100	Hard	(China) Ye Qiuyu	(Japan) Momoko Kobori (Japan) Ayano Shimizu	6–3, 5–7, [10–12]
Loss	14–5	Jan 2026	ITF Nonthaburi, Thailand	W75	Hard	(Hong Kong) Cody Wong	(Chinese Taipei) Cho I-hsuan (Chinese Taipei) Cho Yi-tsen	4–6, 7–6^{(7–3)}, [6–10]
Win	15–5	Jan 2026	ITF Birmingham, United Kingdom	W35	Hard (i)	(Hong Kong) Cody Wong	(Germany) Noma Noha Akugue (Netherlands) Stephanie Judith Visscher	6–1, 6–3
Loss	15–6	Mar 2026	ITF Maanshan, China	W50	Hard (i)	(Hong Kong) Cody Wong	Sofya Lansere; Alexandra Shubladze	6–7^{(6)}, 2–6
Loss	15–7	Apr 2026	ITF Luzhou, China	W35	Hard	(China) Li Zongyu	(China) Zhang Ying (China) Zheng Wushuang	6–2, 4–6, [10–12]
Win	16–7	May 2026	Kurume International, Japan	W75	Carpet	(China) Ye Qiuyu	(Australia) Gabriella Da Silva-Fick (Australia) Tenika McGiffin	6–3, 6–2
Loss	16–8	May 2026	Takasaki Open, Japan	W100	Hard	(Hong Kong) Cody Wong	(Japan) Ayano Shimizu (Japan) Eri Shimizu	1–6, 4–6
Win	17–8	Jun 2026	ITF Taipei, Taiwan	W35	Hard	(Chinese Taipei) Tsao Chia-yi	(Japan) Funa Kozaki (Japan) Mao Mushika	6–0, 6–4
