= Liang En-shuo =

Taiwanese tennis player (born 2000)

Liang En-shuo 梁恩碩
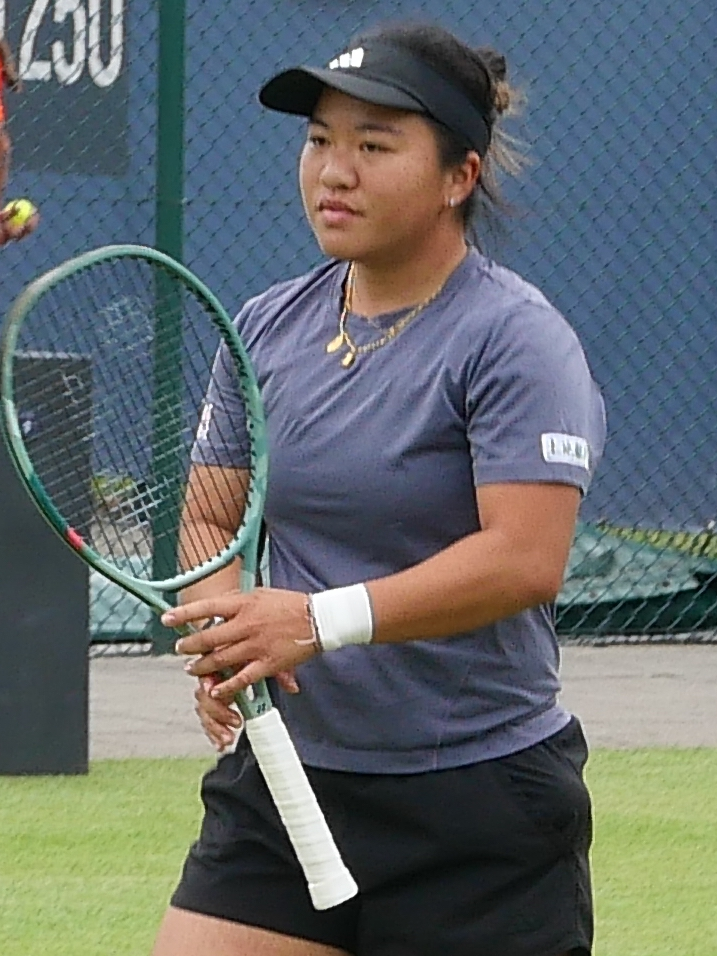
- Liang en route to winning the 2026 Rosmalen Open
- Country (sports): Chinese Taipei
- Born: 2 October 2000 (age 26) Kaohsiung, Taiwan
- Turned pro: 2018
- Plays: Right-handed (two-handed backhand)
- Prize money: $965,631

Singles
- Career record: 215–185
- Career titles: 1 WTA 125
- Highest ranking: No. 150 (13 May 2019)
- Current ranking: No. 335 (12 October 2026)

Grand Slam singles results
- Australian Open: Q2 (2022)
- French Open: 1R (2021)
- Wimbledon: Q2 (2019, 2022)
- US Open: Q3 (2021)

Doubles
- Career record: 210–115
- Career titles: 1 WTA Tour, 5 WTA 125
- Highest ranking: No. 20 (14 September 2026)
- Current ranking: No. 20 (12 October 2026)

Grand Slam doubles results
- French Open: SF (2026)
- Wimbledon: SF (2026)
- US Open: 1R (2026)

Team competitions
- Fed Cup: 6–7
Medal record
Tennis
Representing Chinese Taipei
Asian Games
| Gold medal – first place | 2026 Aichi-Nagoya | Doubles |
| Silver medal – second place | 2022 Hangzhou | Doubles |
| Silver medal – second place | 2022 Hangzhou | Mixed doubles |
| Bronze medal – third place | 2018 Jakarta-Palembang | Singles |
World University Games
| Gold medal – first place | 2021 Chengdu | Doubles |
| Gold medal – first place | 2021 Chengdu | Team |
| Bronze medal – third place | 2021 Chengdu | Singles |
- Last updated on: 16 October 2026.

Liang En-shuo
- Traditional Chinese: 梁恩碩
- Simplified Chinese: 梁恩硕
Transcriptions
Standard Mandarin
- Hanyu Pinyin: Liáng Ēnshuò
- IPA: [ljǎŋ ə́n swô]

Liang En-shuo (Chinese: 梁恩碩; pinyin: Liáng Ēnshuò; born 2 October 2000) is a Taiwanese professional tennis player. She has a career-high doubles ranking by the WTA of No. 20, achieved on 14 September 2026, and a best singles ranking of No. 150, reached on 13 May 2019.

Liang has reached four WTA Tour doubles finals, winning one. She also won five doubles and one singles titles on WTA 125 tournaments.

== Career ==
=== Junior years ===
Liang had a career-high ITF junior combined ranking of No. 2, achieved on 29 January 2018. She won the Australian Open girls' singles title, defeating Clara Burel in straight sets in the final. Alongside Wang Xinyu, Liang also won the girls' doubles title at the same event, defeating Violet Apisah and Lulu Sun.

=== Professional ===
Liang made her Grand Slam singles debut as a qualifier at the 2021 French Open, losing to Fiona Ferro in the first round.

Partnering Rebecca Marino, she won her first WTA 125 doubles title at the 2021 Charleston Pro Tennis, defeating top seeds Erin Routliffe and Aldila Sutjiadi in the final which went to a deciding champions tiebreak.

Alongside Eudice Chong, Liang reached her first WTA Tour doubles final at the 2025 Guangzhou Open, losing to Katarzyna Piter and Janice Tjen. The pair also made it into the final at the 2026 ATX Open, but were defeated by Storm Hunter and Taylor Townsend. Playing with Tang Qianhui, she was runner-up at the 2026 Open de Rouen, losing in the final to Jesika Malečková and Miriam Škoch.

Liang won her first WTA 125 singles title at the 2026 Jiangxi Open, defeating You Xiaodi in the final. She made her major doubles debut at the 2026 French Open partnering Shuko Aoyama and reached the semifinals, defeating her former partner, Eudice Chong and Veronika Erjavec en route, before losing to second seeds Anna Danilina and Aleksandra Krunić in the last four.

At the 2026 Rosmalen Open, playing alongside Shuko Aoyama, Liang won her first career doubles title in her fourth final, defeating Ingrid Neel and Giuliana Olmos in a champions tiebreak. As a result, she reached world No. 31 in the doubles rankings, on 15 June 2026.

== Performance timeline ==
Key
| W | F | SF | QF | #R | RR | Q# | DNQ | A | NH |

(W) winner; (F) finalist; (SF) semifinalist; (QF) quarterfinalist; (#R) rounds 4, 3, 2, 1; (RR) round-robin stage; (Q#) qualification round; (DNQ) did not qualify; (A) absent; (NH) not held; (SR) strike rate (events won / competed); (W–L) win–loss record.
To avoid confusion and double counting, these charts are updated at the conclusion of a tournament or when the player's participation has ended.

=== Singles ===
Current through the 2022 Thailand Open.

| Tournament | 2018 | 2019 | 2020 | 2021 | 2022 | 2023 | SR | W–L |
|---|---|---|---|---|---|---|---|---|
Grand Slam tournaments
| Australian Open | A | Q1 | Q1 | Q1 | Q2 | A | 0 / 0 | 0–0 |
| French Open | A | Q1 | A | 1R | A | A | 0 / 1 | 0–1 |
| Wimbledon | A | Q2 | NH | Q1 | Q2 | A | 0 / 0 | 0–0 |
| US Open | A | Q1 | A | Q3 | A | A | 0 / 0 | 0–0 |
| Win–Loss | 0–0 | 0–0 | 0–0 | 0–1 | 0–0 | 0–0 | 0 / 1 | 0–1 |
WTA 1000
| Dubai / Qatar Open (Note: The first Premier 5 event of the year has switched back and forth between the Dubai Tennis Championships and the Qatar Ladies Open since 2009. Dubai was classified as a Premier 5 event from 2009 to 2011 before being succeeded by Doha for the 2012–2014 period. In 2015, Dubai regained its Premier 5 status while Doha was demoted to Premier status. The Premier 5 tournaments were reclassified as WTA 1000 tournaments in 2021.) | A | A | A | 1R | A | A | 0 / 1 | 0–1 |
| Indian Wells Open | A | A | NH | 1R | A | A | 0 / 1 | 0–1 |
Career statistics
| Tournaments | 1 | 0 | 1 | 4 | 1 | 1 | Career total: 8 | |
| Overall win–loss | 2–1 | 0–0 | 1–1 | 1–4 | 0–1 | 0–1 | 0 / 8 | 4–8 |

== WTA Tour finals ==
=== Doubles: 4 (1 title, 3 runner-ups) ===
| Legend WTA 1000 WTA 500 WTA 250 (1–3) | Finals by surface Hard (0–2) Clay (0–1) Grass (1–0) | Finals by setting Outdoor (1–2) Indoor (0–1) |

| Result | Date | Tournament | Tier | Surface | Partner | Opponents | Score |
|---|---|---|---|---|---|---|---|
| Loss | Oct 2025 | Guangzhou Open, China | WTA 250 | Hard | (Hong Kong) Eudice Chong | (Poland) Katarzyna Piter (Indonesia) Janice Tjen | 6–3, 3–6, [5–10] |
| Loss | Mar 2026 | ATX Open, United States | WTA 250 | Hard | (Hong Kong) Eudice Chong | (Australia) Storm Hunter (United States) Taylor Townsend | 3–6, 4–6 |
| Loss | Apr 2026 | Open de Rouen, France | WTA 250 | Clay (i) | (China) Tang Qianhui | (Czech Republic) Jesika Malečková (Czech Republic) Miriam Škoch | 2–6, 5–7 |
| Win | Jun 2026 | Rosmalen Open, Netherlands | WTA 250 | Grass | (Japan) Shuko Aoyama | (Estonia) Ingrid Neel (Mexico) Giuliana Olmos | 6–2, 2–6, [10–7] |

== WTA 125 finals ==
=== Singles: 1 (title) ===
| Result | W–L | Date | Tournament | Surface | Opponents | Score |
|---|---|---|---|---|---|---|
| Win | 1–0 | May 2026 | Jiangxi Open, China | Hard | (China) You Xiaodi | 3–6, 6–4, 6–1 |

=== Doubles: 6 (5 titles, 1 runner-up) ===
| Result | W–L | Date | Tournament | Surface | Partner | Opponents | Score |
|---|---|---|---|---|---|---|---|
| Win | 1–0 | Jul 2021 | Charleston Pro, US | Clay | (Canada) Rebecca Marino | (New Zealand) Erin Routliffe (Indonesia) Aldila Sutjiadi | 5–7, 7–5, [10–7] |
| Loss | 1–1 | Jul 2025 | Porto Open, Portugal | Hard | (Thailand) Peangtarn Plipuech | (United States) Carmen Corley (United States) Ivana Corley | 3–6, 1–6 |
| Win | 2–1 | Sep 2025 | Changsha Open, China | Hard | (Hong Kong) Eudice Chong | (Chinese Taipei) Li Yu-yun (China) Yao Xinxin | 7–5, 6–3 |
| Win | 3–1 | Sep 2025 | Jingshan Open, China | Hard | (Hong Kong) Eudice Chong | (Chinese Taipei) Lee Ya-hsin (Hong Kong) Cody Wong | 7–6^{(7–4)}, 6–2 |
| Win | 4–1 | Jan 2026 | Philippine Women's Open, Philippines | Hard | (Hong Kong) Eudice Chong | (United States) Sabrina Santamaria (United States) Quinn Gleason | 2–6, 7–6^{(7–2)}, [10–6] |
| Win | 5–1 | May 2026 | Clarins Open, France | Clay | (Japan) Shuko Aoyama | (Ukraine) Lyudmyla Kichenok (United States) Desirae Krawczyk | 7–6^{(7–5)}, 6–2 |

== ITF Circuit finals ==
=== Singles: 6 (1 title, 5 runner-ups) ===
| Legend W80 tournaments (0–1) W25/35 tournaments (1–2) W15 tournaments (0–1) | Finals by surface Hard (1–5) |

| Result | W–L | Date | Tournament | Tier | Surface | Opponent | Score |
|---|---|---|---|---|---|---|---|
| Loss | 0–1 | Oct 2017 | ITF Nonthaburi, Thailand | W15 | Hard | (Thailand) Patcharin Cheapchandej | 6–7^{(2)}, 0–6 |
| Loss | 0–2 | May 2018 | ITF Goyang, South Korea | W25 | Hard | (Japan) Mayo Hibi | 3–6, 3–6 |
| Win | 1–2 | May 2018 | Incheon Open, South Korea | W25 | Hard | (South Korea) Han Na-lae | 6–2, 0–6, 7–5 |
| Loss | 1–3 | Apr 2019 | Kangaroo Cup Gifu, Japan | W80 | Hard | (Kazakhstan) Zarina Diyas | 0–6, 2–6 |
| Loss | 1–4 | Jun 2023 | ITF Changwon, South Korea | W25 | Hard | (South Korea) Park So-hyun | 4–6, 5–7 |
| Loss | 1–5 | Apr 2025 | ITF Osaka, Japan | W35 | Hard | (China) Ma Yexin | 4–6, 6–4, 4–6 |

=== Doubles: 25 (13 titles, 12 runner-ups) ===
| Legend W100 tournaments (1–2) W60/75 tournaments (5–7) W40/50 tournaments (5–0) W25 tournaments (0–2) W15 tournaments (2–1) | Finals by surface Hard (11–9) Clay (2–2) Grass (0–1) |

| Result | W–L | Date | Tournament | Tier | Surface | Partner | Opponents | Score |
|---|---|---|---|---|---|---|---|---|
| Win | 1–0 | Oct 2017 | ITF Nonthaburi, Thailand | W15 | Hard | (Chinese Taipei) Chan Chin-wei | (Thailand) Nudnida Luangnam (Thailand) Varunya Wongteanchai | 6–1, 6–4 |
| Win | 2–0 | Mar 2019 | Pingshan Open, China | W60 | Hard | (China) Xun Fangying | (Japan) Hiroko Kuwata (Uzbekistan) Sabina Sharipova | 6–4, 6–1 |
| Loss | 2–1 | Jan 2021 | ITF Fujairah, UAE | W25 | Hard | (China) You Xiaodi | (Turkey) Çağla Büyükakçay (Switzerland) Viktorija Golubic | 7–5, 4–6, [4–10] |
| Win | 3–1 | Feb 2021 | ITF Sharm El Sheikh, Egypt | W15 | Hard | (Japan) Kyōka Okamura | (Belgium) Magali Kempen (Belarus) Shalimar Talbi | 1–6, 6–4, [10–3] |
| Loss | 3–2 | Feb 2021 | ITF Sharm El Sheikh, Egypt | W15 | Hard | (Japan) Miyabi Inoue | (Japan) Erika Sema (Belarus) Shalimar Talbi | 6–2, 0–6, [12–14] |
| Loss | 3–3 | Jun 2021 | Open de Montpellier, France | W60 | Clay | (China) Yuan Yue | (France) Estelle Cascino (Italy) Camilla Rosatello | 3–6, 2–6 |
| Loss | 3–4 | Oct 2021 | Berkeley Tennis Challenge, US | W60 | Hard | (China) Lu Jiajing | (United States) Sophie Chang (United States) Angela Kulikov | 4–6, 3–6 |
| Loss | 3–5 | Oct 2021 | Rancho Santa Fe Open, US | W60 | Hard | (Canada) Rebecca Marino | (Slovakia) Tereza Mihalíková (Poland) Katarzyna Kawa | 3–6, 6–4, [6–10] |
| Loss | 3–6 | May 2022 | Grado Tennis Cup, Italy | W60 | Clay | (Hong Kong) Eudice Chong | (Russia) Alena Fomina-Klotz (Slovenia) Dalila Jakupović | 1–6, 4–6 |
| Win | 4–6 | Dec 2022 | All Japan Indoors | W60 | Hard (i) | (Chinese Taipei) Wu Fang-hsien | (Japan) Momoko Kobori (Thailand) Luksika Kumkhum | 2–6, 7–6^{(5)}, [10–2] |
| Win | 5–6 | Jan 2023 | ITF Nonthaburi, Thailand | W40 | Hard | (China) Ma Yexin | (Japan) Hiroko Kuwata (Ukraine) Kateryna Volodko | 6–0, 6–3 |
| Win | 6–6 | Jan 2023 | ITF Nonthaburi, Thailand | W40 | Hard | (China) Ma Yexin | (Chinese Taipei) Lee Pei-chi (Indonesia) Jessy Rompies | 6–3, 2–6, [10–6] |
| Loss | 6–7 | Feb 2023 | ITF Swan Hill, Australia | W25 | Grass | (China) Wang Yafan | (Australia) Lily Fairclough (Australia) Olivia Gadecki | 3–6, 3–6 |
| Loss | 6–8 | Mar 2024 | Trnava Indoor, Slovakia | W75 | Hard (i) | (China) Tang Qianhui | (Netherlands) Isabelle Haverlag (United States) Anna Rogers | 3–6, 6–4, [10–12] |
| Win | 7–8 | May 2024 | Kangaroo Cup Gifu, Japan | W100 | Hard | (China) Tang Qianhui | (Australia) Kimberly Birrell (Canada) Rebecca Marino | 6–0, 6–3 |
| Win | 8–8 | May 2024 | ITF Goyang, South Korea | W50 | Hard | (Hong Kong) Eudice Chong | (Thailand) Luksika Kumkhum (Thailand) Peangtarn Plipuech | 7–5, 6–4 |
| Loss | 8–9 | Jul 2024 | Championnats de Granby, Canada | W75+H | Hard | (South Korea) Park So-hyun | (Canada) Ariana Arseneault (Canada) Mia Kupres | 4–6, 6–0, [6–10] |
| Loss | 8–10 | Nov 2024 | Takasaki Open, Japan | W100 | Hard | (Chinese Taipei) Tsao Chia-yi | (Japan) Momoko Kobori (Japan) Ayano Shimizu | 6–4, 4–6, [3–10] |
| Loss | 8–11 | Jun 2025 | Sumter Pro Open, US | W75 | Hard | (China) Ma Yexin | (United Kingdom) Tara Moore (United States) Abigail Rencheli | 5–7, 2–6 |
| Win | 9–11 | Jun 2025 | ITF Palma del Río, Spain | W50 | Hard | (China) Feng Shuo | (Colombia) María Paulina Pérez (Mexico) Victoria Rodríguez | 6–2, 6–3 |
| Win | 10–11 | Jul 2025 | ITF Corroios, Portugal | W50 | Hard | (Hong Kong) Eudice Chong | (India) Riya Bhatia (Australia) Elena Micic | 6–1, 6–0 |
| Win | 11–11 | Jul 2025 | Internazionali di Cordenons, Italy | W75 | Clay | (Thailand) Peangtarn Plipuech | (Czech Republic) Karolína Kubáňová (Czech Republic) Aneta Laboutková | 6–4, 6–2 |
| Win | 12–11 | Aug 2025 | Ladies Open Amstetten, Austria | W75 | Clay | (China) Feng Shuo | (Slovenia) Dalila Jakupović (Slovenia) Nika Radišić | 4–6, 6–4, [10–0] |
| Win | 13–11 | Jan 2026 | ITF Nonthaburi, Thailand | W75 | Hard | (Hong Kong) Eudice Chong | (Chinese Taipei) Cho I-hsuan (Chinese Taipei) Cho Yi-tsen | 5–7, 6–1, [10–8] |
| Loss | 13–12 | Apr 2026 | ITF Tokyo Open, Japan | W100 | Hard | (Hong Kong) Eudice Chong | (Australia) Alexandra Osborne (Hong Kong) Cody Wong | 6–3, 5–7, [7–10] |

=== Junior Grand Slam tournament finals ===
==== Singles: 1 (title) ====
| Result | Year | Tournament | Surface | Opponent | Score |
|---|---|---|---|---|---|
| Win | 2018 | Australian Open | Hard | (France) Clara Burel | 6–3, 6–4 |

==== Doubles: 1 (title) ====
| Result | Year | Tournament | Surface | Partner | Opponents | Score |
|---|---|---|---|---|---|---|
| Win | 2018 | Australian Open | Hard | (China) Wang Xinyu | (Papua New Guinea) Violet Apisah (Switzerland) Lulu Sun | 7–6^{(4)}, 4–6, [10–5] |
