= Jiangxi International Women's Tennis Open =

WTA Tour
- Tour: WTA Tour
- Location: Nanchang (2014–2019, 2023), Jiujiang (2024–present), Jiangxi, China
- Venue: Nanchang International Tennis Center (2014–2023); Jiujiang International Tennis Center (2024–present)
- Category: WTA 125
- Surface: Hard
- Draw: 32M/12Q/16D
- Prize money: $115,000
- Website: jxopen.net

Current champions (2026)
- Singles: (Chinese Taipei) Liang En-shuo
- Doubles: (Chinese Taipei) Lee Ya-hsin (China) Ye Qiuyu

The Jiangxi Open (Chinese: 江西网球公开赛) is a tournament for professional female tennis players. Since 2024 the event is held in Jiujiang, China on outdoor hardcourts. For the first two years, it was a WTA 125K series level event. Beginning in 2016, it became one of the main WTA Tour-level tournaments under the International classification. It returned to the WTA 125 status in 2026.

It was previously held at the Nanchang International Tennis Center in Nanchang, Jiangxi province, China. It was also part of the China Open Series. The best performance of Chinese players in women's singles used to receive a wildcard from the China Open.

== Past finals ==
=== Singles ===
Year	Champion	Runner-up	Score
↓ WTA $125,000 event ↓
2014	(China) Peng Shuai	(China) Liu Fangzhou	6–2, 3–6, 6–3
2015	(Serbia) Jelena Janković	(Chinese Taipei) Chang Kai-chen	6–3, 7–6^{(8–6)}
↓ WTA International event ↓
2016	(China) Duan Yingying	(United States) Vania King	1–6, 6–4, 6–2
2017	(China) Peng Shuai (2)	(Japan) Nao Hibino	6–3, 6–2
2018	(China) Wang Qiang	(China) Zheng Saisai	7–5, 4–0 ret.
2019	(Sweden) Rebecca Peterson	(Kazakhstan) Elena Rybakina	6–2, 6–0
2020	Initially rescheduled to October, but later cancelled, due to the COVID-19 pandemic		
2021–2022	Cancelled due to the COVID-19 pandemic		
2023	(Czech Republic) Kateřina Siniaková	(Czech Republic) Marie Bouzková	1–6, 7–6^{(7–5)}, 7–6^{(7–4)}
2024	(Switzerland) Viktorija Golubic	(Slovakia) Rebecca Šramková	6–3, 7–5
2025	Anna Blinkova	(Austria) Lilli Tagger	6–3, 6–3
↓ WTA $125,000 event ↓
2026	(Chinese Taipei) Liang En-shuo	(China) You Xiaodi	3–6, 6–4, 6–1

=== Doubles ===
Year	Champions	Runners-up	Score
↓ WTA $125,000 event ↓
2014	(Chinese Taipei) Chuang Chia-jung (Japan) Junri Namigata	(Chinese Taipei) Chan Chin-wei (China) Xu Yifan	7–6^{(7–4)}, 6–3
2015	(Chinese Taipei) Chang Kai-chen (China) Zheng Saisai	(Chinese Taipei) Chan Chin-wei (China) Wang Yafan	6–3, 4–6, [10–3]
↓ WTA International event ↓
2016	(China) Liang Chen (China) Lu Jingjing	(Japan) Shuko Aoyama (Japan) Makoto Ninomiya	3–6, 7–6^{(7–2)}, [13–11]
2017	(China) Jiang Xinyu (China) Tang Qianhui	(Russia) Alla Kudryavtseva (Australia) Arina Rodionova	6–3, 6–2
2018	(China) Jiang Xinyu (2) (China) Tang Qianhui (2)	(China) Lu Jingjing (China) You Xiaodi	6–4, 6–4
2019	(China) Wang Xinyu (China) Zhu Lin	(China) Peng Shuai (China) Zhang Shuai	6–2, 7–6^{(7–5)}
2020	Initially rescheduled to October, but later cancelled, due to the COVID-19 pandemic		
2021	cancelled due to the COVID-19 pandemic		
2022	Not held due to Peng Shuai disappearance		
2023	(Germany) Laura Siegemund; Vera Zvonareva	(Japan) Eri Hozumi (Japan) Makoto Ninomiya	6–4, 6–2
2024	(China) Guo Hanyu (Japan) Moyuka Uchijima	(Poland) Katarzyna Piter (Hungary) Fanny Stollár	7–6^{(7–5)}, 7–5
2025	(United States) Quinn Gleason; Elena Pridankina	Ekaterina Ovcharenko (United Kingdom) Emily Webley-Smith	6–4, 2–6, [10–6]
↓ WTA $125,000 event ↓
2026	(Chinese Taipei) Lee Ya-hsin (China) Ye Qiuyu	(China) Dang Yiming (China) You Xiaodi	2–6, 6–2, [11–9]
