= Ye Qiuyu =

Chinese tennis player

Ye Qiuyu 叶秋语
- Country (sports): China
- Born: 29 November 1997 (age 28) China
- Plays: Right (two-handed-backhand)
- Prize money: $117,891

Singles
- Career record: 151–125
- Highest ranking: No. 480 (30 April 2018)

Doubles
- Career record: 239–136
- Career titles: 1 WTA 125, 22 ITF
- Highest ranking: No. 95 (20 November 2017)
- Current ranking: No. 114 (19 October 2026)

Grand Slam doubles results
- Australian Open: 1R (2015)
Medal record
Representing a Mixed-NOCs team
Youth Olympic Games
Silver medal – second place	2014 Nanjing	Mixed doubles
- Last updated on: 25 October 2026.

Ye Qiuyu (Chinese: 叶秋语; pinyin: Yè Qiūyǔ; Mandarin pronunciation: [jê tɕʰjóʊ ỳ]; born 29 November 1997) is a Chinese tennis player.

In her career, Ye has won one doubles title on WTA 125 tournaments and 22 doubles titles on the ITF Women's Circuit. On 30 April 2018, she reached her best singles ranking of world No. 480. On 20 November 2017, she peaked at No. 95 in the doubles rankings.

Ye made her WTA Tour main-draw debut at the 2014 Shenzhen Open in the doubles draw, partnering with Yang Zhaoxuan. The pair lost their first-round match against third seeds Irina Buryachok and Oksana Kalashnikova.

== WTA 125 finals ==
=== Doubles: 2 (1 title, 1 runner-up) ===
Result	W–L	Date	Tournament	Surface	Partner	Opponents	Score
Loss	0–1	Sep 2017	Dalian Open, China	Hard	(China) Guo Hanyu	(China) Lu Jingjing (China) You Xiaodi	6–7^{(2)}, 6–4, [5–10]
Win	1–1	May 2026	Jiangxi Open, China	Hard	(Chinese Taipei) Lee Ya-hsin	(China) Dang Yiming (China) You Xiaodi	2–6, 6–2, [11–9]

== ITF Circuit finals ==
=== Singles: 3 (3 runner-ups) ===
Legend
W10/15 tournaments

Result	W–L	Date	Location	Tier	Surface	Opponent	Score
Loss	0–1	Jul 2014	Istanbul, Turkey	W10	Hard	(Ukraine) Olga Fridman	5–7, 4–6
Loss	0–2	Mar 2018	Nanjing, China	W15	Hard	(China) Xun Fangying	1–6, 1–6
Loss	0–3	Mar 2025	ITF Ma'anshan, China	W15	Hard	Daria Egorova	2–6, 1–6

=== Doubles: 39 (22 titles, 17 runner-ups) ===
Legend
W100 tournaments
W75 tournaments
W60/75 tournaments
W50 tournaments
W25/35 tournaments
W10/15 tournaments

Result	W–L	Date	Tournament	Tier	Surface	Partner	Opponents	Score
Win	1–0	May 2013	ITF Seoul, Korea	W10	Hard	(China) Han Xinyun	(Chinese Taipei) Chan Chin-wei (China) Zhang Nannan	7–6^{(3)}, 4–6, [10–4]
Loss	1–1	Jul 2014	ITF Istanbul, Turkey	W10	Hard	(China) Gao Xinyu	(Norway) Emma Flood (Netherlands) Nikki Luttikhuis	6–7^{(5)}, 6–2, [6–10]
Win	2–1	Sep 2014	ITF Antalya, Turkey	W10	Hard	(China) You Xiaodi	(Belgium) Déborah Kerfs (Italy) Camilla Rosatello	7–5, 2–6, [10–8]
Win	3–1	Oct 2014	ITF Antalya, Turkey	W10	Hard	(China) You Xiaodi	(Czech Republic) Kateřina Kramperová (Romania) Daiana Negreanu	7–6^{(3)}, 5–7, [10–6]
Win	4–1	Dec 2014	ITF Hong Kong, China SAR	W10	Hard	(China) Yang Zhaoxuan	(South Korea) Hong Seung-yeon (South Korea) Kang Seo-kyung	6–4, 6–3
Loss	4–2	Jan 2015	ITF Hong Kong	W10	Hard	(China) Tang Haochen	(Japan) Mana Ayukawa (Japan) Makoto Ninomiya	6–7^{(4)}, 6–2, [7–10]
Loss	4–3	Mar 2015	ITF Jiangmen, China	W10	Hard	(China) Xin Yuan	(China) You Xiaodi (China) Zhu Aiwen	6–4, 5–7, [4–10]
Loss	4–4	Apr 2015	ITF Nanning, China	W25	Hard	(China) Yang Zhaoxuan	(China) Liu Chang (China) Lu Jiajing	6–1, 1–6, [8–10]
Loss	4–5	May 2015	Anning Open, China	W75	Hard	(China) Yang Zhaoxuan	(China) Xu Yifan (China) Zheng Saisai	5–7, 2–6
Win	5–5	Jun 2016	ITF Sangju, Korea	W10	Hard	(South Korea) Kim Ju-eun	(South Korea) Han Sung-hee (China) Wang Yan	7–5, 6–7^{(6)}, [10–6]
Loss	5–6	Feb 2017	ITF Nanjing, China	W15	Hard	(Thailand) Nudnida Luangnam	(China) Guo Shanshan (China) Jiang Xinyu	5–7, 5–7
Win	6–6	Mar 2017	Blossom Cup, China	W60	Hard	(China) Han Xinyun	(Japan) Hiroko Kuwata (China) Zhu Lin	6–3, 6–3
Win	7–6	Apr 2017	Kunming Open, China	W100	Hard	(China) Han Xinyun	(India) Prarthana Thombare (China) Xun Fangying	6–2, 7–5
Win	8–6	Mar 2018	Nanjing, China	W15	Hard	(China) Han Xinyun	(China) Sun Xuliu (China) Zhao Qianqian	3–6, 6–3, [10–5]
Win	9–6	Apr 2018	Blossom Cup, China	W60	Hard	(China) Han Xinyun	(China) Guo Hanyu (China) Wang Xinyu	7–6^{(3)}, 7–6^{(6)}
Loss	9–7	Jul 2018	ITF Tianjin, China	W25	Hard	(China) Chen Jiahui	(China) Feng Shuo (China) Jiang Xinyu	4–6, 4–6
Win	10–7	Oct 2018	ITF Nanning, China	W25	Hard	(South Korea) Kim Na-ri	(China) Feng Shuo (China) Guo Hanyu	6–3, 6–0
Win	11–7	Nov 2018	Liuzhou Open, China	W60	Hard	(Hong Kong) Eudice Chong	(South Korea) Lee So-ra (China) Kang Jiaqi	7–5, 6–3
Loss	11–8	Jun 2019	ITF Luzhou, China	W25	Hard	(China) Guo Hanyu	(China) Feng Shuo (China) Xun Fangying	3–6, 1–6
Win	12–8	Jun 2019	ITF Shenzhen, China	W25	Hard	(China) Guo Hanyu	(China) Chen Jiahui (China) Wu Meixu	1–6, 7–6^{(4)}, [11–9]
Loss	12–9	Aug 2019	ITF Huangshan, China	W25	Hard	(Hong Kong) Eudice Chong	(South Korea) Jang Su-jeong (South Korea) Kim Na-ri	5–7, 1–6
Loss	12–10	Jul 2024	ITF Naiman, China	W35	Hard	(China) Lu Jingjing	(China) Guo Meiqi (China) Huang Yujia	3–6, 6–3, [11–13]
Win	13–10	Sep 2024	ITF Guiyang, China	W50	Hard	(China) Feng Shuo	(China) Li Zongyu (China) Shi Han	7–6^{(3)}, 6–3
Loss	13–11	Sep 2024	ITF Yeongwol, South Korea	W15	Hard	(South Korea) Jeong Su-nam	(Chinese Taipei) Lee Ya-hsin (Chinese Taipei) Lin Fang-an	4–6, 7–6^{(6)}, [6–10]
Loss	13–12	Sep 2024	ITF Yeongwol, South Korea	W15	Hard	(South Korea) Kim Na-ri	(South Korea) Back Da-yeon (South Korea) Lee Eun-hye	1–6, 1–6
Loss	13–13	Oct 2024	ITF Huzhou, China	W35	Hard	(China) Xiao Zhenghua	Sofya Lansere; Ekaterina Shalimova	2–6, 3–6
Loss	13–14	Feb 2025	ITF Ma'anshan, China	W15	Hard	(South Korea) Kim Na-ri	Daria Egorova; Ekaterina Shalimova	2–6, 5–7
Win	14–14	Mar 2025	ITF Ma'anshan, China	W15	Hard	(South Korea) Kim Na-ri	(China) Lu Jingjing (China) Xun Fangying	6–4, 6–1
Win	15–14	Apr 2025	ITF Wuning, China	W15	Hard	(South Korea) Kim Na-ri	(Slovakia) Viktória Morvayová (China) Ren Yufei	6–2, 7–5
Win	16–14	Apr 2025	ITF Wuning, China	W15	Hard	(South Korea) Kim Na-ri	(China) Wang Jiaqi (China) Xu Jiayu	6–2, 6–4
Win	17–14	Jul 2025	ITF Nakhon Pathom, Thailand	W15	Hard	(South Korea) Kim Na-ri	(Japan) Haruna Arakawa (Japan) Natsumi Kawaguchi	6–3, 6–2
Win	18–14	Jul 2025	ITF Nakhon Pathom	W15	Hard	(South Korea) Kim Na-ri	(Thailand) Thasaporn Naklo (Thailand) Bunyawi Thamchaiwat	6–2, 6–3
Win	19–14	Jul 2025	ITF Nakhon Pathom	W35	Hard	(South Korea) Kim Na-ri	(Thailand) Salakthip Ounmuang (Thailand) Kamonwan Yodpetch	6–4, 4–6, [10–5]
Win	20–14	Aug 2025	ITF Nakhon Pathom	W15	Hard	(South Korea) Kim Na-ri	(Thailand) Anchisa Chanta (Thailand) Patcharin Cheapchandej	6–3, 6–0
Win	21–14	Oct 2025	ITF Qiandaohu, China	W35	Hard	(China) Wang Meiling	(China) Hou Yanan (China) Yuan Chengyiyi	6–1, 6–2
Loss	21–15	Nov 2025	Takasaki Open, Japan	W100	Hard	(Chinese Taipei) Lee Ya-hsin	(Japan) Momoko Kobori (Japan) Ayano Shimizu	6–3, 5–7, [10–12]
Loss	21–16	Mar 2026	ITF Ma'anshan, China	W15	Hard	(South Korea) Kim Na-ri	(Sweden) Tiana Tian Deng (China) Wang Meiling	6–2, 5–7, [8–10]
Win	22–16	May 2026	Kurume Cup, Japan	W75	Carpet	(Chinese Taipei) Lee Ya-hsin	(Australia) Gabriella Da Silva-Fick (Australia) Tenika McGiffin	6–3, 6–2
Loss	22–17	May 2026	ITF Wuning, China	W35	Hard	(China) Wang Meiling	(New Zealand) Monique Barry (Japan) Hikaru Sato	6–7^{(3)}, 4–6

=== Junior Grand Slam finals ===
==== Doubles: 1 (title) ====
Result	Year	Championship	Surface	Partner	Opponents	Score
Win	2014	Wimbledon	Grass	(Indonesia) Tami Grende	(Czech Republic) Marie Bouzková (Hungary) Dalma Gálfi	6–2, 7–6^{(7–5)}
