= You Xiaodi =

Chinese tennis player (born 1996)

You Xiaodi 尤晓迪
- You at the 2026 Wimbledon Championships
- Country (sports): China
- Born: 12 May 1996 (age 30) China
- Prize money: US$ 595,279

Singles
- Career record: 327–274
- Career titles: 6 ITF
- Highest ranking: No. 166 (16 March 2020)
- Current ranking: No. 199 (21 September 2026)

Grand Slam singles results
- Australian Open: Q2 (2022)
- French Open: Q2 (2024)
- Wimbledon: Q1 (2021, 2024, 2026)
- US Open: Q1 (2024, 2026)

Doubles
- Career record: 210–151
- Career titles: 1 WTA 125, 19 ITF
- Highest ranking: No. 102 (12 September 2016)
- Current ranking: No. 545 (13 October 2025)
- Last updated on: 13 October 2025.

You Xiaodi (Chinese: 尤晓迪; pinyin: Yóu Xiǎodí; Mandarin pronunciation: [jǒʊ ɕjàʊ tǐ]; born 12 May 1996) is a Chinese tennis player.

She has won one WTA 125 doubles title, as well as six singles and 19 doubles titles on the ITF Circuit. On 16 March 2020, she reached her best singles ranking of world No. 166. On 12 September 2016, she peaked at No. 102 in the doubles rankings.

== Career ==
You made her WTA Tour debut at the 2014 Shenzhen Open, partnering Liu Fangzhou in doubles. The pair lost their first-round match against Monica Niculescu and Klára Zakopalová, who went on to win the tournament.

Partnering Jang Su-jeong, she reached the final at the 2022 WTA 125 Argentina Open, losing to Sara Errani and Irina Bara.

Playing with Kyōka Okamura, You was runner-up in the doubles tournament of the 2023 WTA 125 Copa Oster, losing to Weronika Falkowska and Katarzyna Kawa in the final which went to a deciding champions tiebreak.

She qualified for the singles main draw at the 2023 Jiangxi Open, where she defeated sixth seed Anna Blinkova, before losing to Leylah Fernandez in the second round.

In November 2025, You was selected as part of the 2026 United Cup China team.

== Performance timeline ==
Key
W	F	SF	QF	#R	RR	Q#	DNQ	A	NH

(W) winner; (F) finalist; (SF) semifinalist; (QF) quarterfinalist; (#R) rounds 4, 3, 2, 1; (RR) round-robin stage; (Q#) qualification round; (DNQ) did not qualify; (A) absent; (NH) not held; (SR) strike rate (events won / competed); (W–L) win–loss record.
To avoid confusion and double counting, these charts are updated at the conclusion of a tournament or when the player's participation has ended.

Only main-draw results in WTA Tour, Grand Slam tournaments, Fed Cup/Billie Jean King Cup and Olympic Games are included in win–loss records.

=== Singles ===
Current through the 2022 Pan Pacific Open.

Tournament	2016	2017	2018	2019	2020	2021	2022	2023	SR	W–L	Win%
Grand Slam tournaments
Australian Open	A	A	A	A	Q1	Q1	Q2	A	0 / 0	0–0	–
French Open	A	A	A	A	Q1	Q1	A	A	0 / 0	0–0	–
Wimbledon	A	A	A	A	NH	Q1	A	A	0 / 0	0–0	–
US Open	A	A	A	A	A	A	A	A	0 / 0	0–0	–
Win–loss	0–0	0–0	0–0	0–0	0–0	0–0	0–0	0–0	0 / 0	0–0	–
WTA 1000
Dubai / Qatar Open (Note: The first Premier 5 event of the year has switched back and forth between the Dubai Tennis Championships and the Qatar Ladies Open since 2009. Dubai was classified as a Premier 5 event from 2009 to 2011 before being succeeded by Doha for the 2012–2014 period. In 2015, Dubai regained its Premier 5 status while Doha was demoted to Premier status. The Premier 5 tournaments were reclassified as WTA 1000 tournaments in 2021.)	A	A	A	A	A	A	A		0 / 0	0–0	–
Indian Wells Open	A	A	A	A	NH	A	A		0 / 0	0–0	–
Miami Open	A	A	A	A	NH	A	A		0 / 0	0–0	–
Madrid Open	A	A	A	A	NH	A	A		0 / 0	0–0	–
Italian Open	A	A	A	A	A	A	Q1		0 / 0	0–0	–
Canadian Open	A	A	A	A	NH	A	A		0 / 0	0–0	–
Cincinnati Open	A	A	A	A	A	A	A		0 / 0	0–0	–
Guadalajara Open	NMS/NH								0 / 0	0–0	–
Wuhan Open	A	A	A	A	NH				0 / 0	0–0	–
China Open	A	A	A	Q1	NH			Q1	0 / 0	0–0	–
Career statistics
Tournaments	1	2	0	2	1	0	2		Career total: 8		
Overall win-loss	0–1	0–2	0–0	0–2	1–1	0–0	0–2		0 / 8	1–8	11%
Year-end ranking	398	416	334	223	185	265			$334,482		

== Significant finals ==
=== WTA Elite Trophy ===
==== Doubles: 1 (runner–up) ====
Result	Year	Venue	Surface	Partner	Opponents	Score
Loss	2016	Elite Trophy, Zhuhai	Hard (i)	(China) Yang Zhaoxuan	(Turkey) İpek Soylu (China) Xu Yifan	4–6, 6–3, [7–10]

== WTA Tour finals ==
=== Doubles: 3 (3 runner-ups) ===
Legend Elite Trophy (0–1) WTA 500 (0–0) WTA 250 (0–2)	Finals by surface Hard (0–3) Clay (0–0) Grass (0–0)

Result	W–L	Date	Tournament	Tier	Surface	Partner	Opponents	Score
Loss	0–1	Sep 2015	Guangzhou International Open, China	International (Note: The WTA International tournaments were reclassified as WTA 250 tournaments in 2021.)	Hard	(China) Xu Shilin	(Switzerland) Martina Hingis (India) Sania Mirza	3–6, 1–6
Loss	0–2	Oct 2016	Elite Trophy Zhuhai, China	Elite Trophy	Hard (i)	(China) Yang Zhaoxuan	(Turkey) İpek Soylu (China) Xu Yifan	4–6, 6–3, [7–10]
Loss	0–3	Jul 2018	Jiangxi International Open, China	International	Hard	(China) Lu Jingjing	(China) Jiang Xinyu (China) Tang Qianhui	4–6, 4–6

== WTA 125 finals ==
=== Singles: 1 (runner-up) ===
Result	W–L	Date	Tournament	Surface	Opponents	Score
Loss	0–1	May 2026	Jiangxi Open, China	Hard	(Chinese Taipei) Liang En-shuo	6–3, 4–6, 1–6

=== Doubles: 4 (1 title, 3 runner-ups) ===
Result	W–L	Date	Tournament	Surface	Partner	Opponents	Score
Win	0–1	Sep 2017	Dalian Women's Open, China	Hard	(China) Lu Jingjing	(China) Guo Hanyu (China) Ye Qiuyu	7–6^{(2)}, 4–6, [10–5]
Loss	1–1	Nov 2022	Buenos Aires Open, Argentina	Clay	(South Korea) Jang Su-jeong	(Romania) Irina Bara (Italy) Sara Errani	1–6, 5–7
Loss	1–2	Feb 2023	Copa Cali, Colombia	Clay	(Japan) Kyōka Okamura	(Poland) Weronika Falkowska (Poland) Katarzyna Kawa	1–6, 7–5, [6–10]
Loss	1–3	May 2026	Jiangxi Open, China	Hard	(China) Dang Yiming	(Chinese Taipei) Lee Ya-hsin (China) Ye Qiuyu	6–2, 2–6, [9–11]

== ITF Circuit finals ==
=== Singles: 17 (7 titles, 10 runner-ups) ===
Legend W100 tournaments (1–0) W60/75 tournaments (1–1) W40/50 tournaments (0–2) W25/35 tournaments (2–5) $10/15,000 tournaments (3–2)	Finals by surface Hard (6–8) Clay (1–2)

Result	W–L	Date	Tournament	Tier	Surface	Opponent	Score
Win	1–0	Jun 2015	ITF Anning, China	10,000	Clay	(India) Sowjanya Bavisetti	7–5, 6–3
Win	2–0	Aug 2015	ITF Yeongwol, South Korea	10,000	Hard	(South Korea) Han Sung-hee	6–1, 6–3
Win	3–0	Sep 2015	ITF Yeongwol, South Korea	10,000	Hard	(China) Zhao Di	7–5, 6–2
Loss	3–1	Mar 2016	ITF Nanjing, China	10,000	Hard	(China) Liu Chang	6–4, 6–7^{(6)}, 1–6
Loss	3–2	Apr 2018	ITF Nanjing, China	15,000	Hard	(China) Gai Ao	6–3, 4–6, 0–6
Win	4–2	Jun 2019	ITF Naiman, China	W25	Hard	(China) Gao Xinyu	6–3, 6–3
Win	5–2	Aug 2019	Jinan International Open, China	W60	Hard	(Australia) Kaylah McPhee	6–3, 7–6^{(5)}
Win	6–2	Feb 2020	Rancho Santa Fe Open, United States	W25	Hard	(Slovakia) Rebecca Šramková	6–4, 7–6^{(5)}
Loss	6–3	Mar 2020	Las Vegas Open, United States	W25	Hard	(United States) Robin Montgomery	6–2, 3–6, 4–6
Loss	6–4	Oct 2022	ITF Hua Hin, Thailand	W25	Hard	(China) Bai Zhuoxuan	5–7, 4–6
Loss	6–5	Jun 2023	ITF Luzhou, China	W25	Hard	(China) Wang Yafan	5–7, 2–6
Loss	6–6	Jul 2023	ITF Naiman, China	W25	Hard	(China) Li Zongyu	4–6, 2–6
Loss	6–7	Aug 2023	ITF Nanchang, China	W40	Clay	(Thailand) Lanlana Tararudee	2–6, 3–6
Loss	6–8	Mar 2025	ITF Shenzhen, China	W50	Hard	(China) Guo Hanyu	4–6, 5–7
Loss	6–9	Oct 2025	ITF Kunshan, China	W35	Hard	(United States) Carol Young Suh Lee	4–6, 5–7
Loss	6–10	Jan 2026	Vero Beach Open, United States	W75	Clay	(Canada) Bianca Andreescu	5–7, 1–6
Win	7–10	Mar 2026	Jin'an Open, China	W100	Hard	Sofya Lansere	6–4, 6–7^{(2)}, 6–4

=== Doubles: 33 (21 titles, 12 runner-ups) ===
Legend $100,000 tournaments (1–0) $75,000 tournaments (1–0) W50/60/75 tournaments (6–2) W25/35 tournaments (4–6) $10/15,000 tournaments (7–2)	Finals by surface Hard (18–11) Clay (3–1)

Result	W–L	Date	Tournament	Tier	Surface	Partner	Opponents	Score
Loss	0–1	Jul 2014	ITF Istanbul, Turkey	10,000	Hard	(China) Gao Xinyu	(Japan) Mai Minokoshi (Japan) Akiko Omae	6–3, 2–6, [4–10]
Win	1–1	Aug 2014	ITF Istanbul, Turkey	10,000	Hard	(China) Wang Yan	(China) Gao Xinyu (China) Yang Zhaoxuan	w/o
Win	2–1	Sep 2014	ITF Antalya, Turkey	10,000	Hard	(China) Wang Yan	(United Kingdom) Harriet Dart (United Kingdom) Jessica Simpson	6–1, 3–6, [10–8]
Win	3–1	Sep 2014	ITF Antalya, Turkey	10,000	Hard	(China) Ye Qiuyu	(Belgium) Déborah Kerfs (Italy) Camilla Rosatello	7–5, 2–6, [10–8]
Win	4–1	Oct 2014	ITF Antalya, Turkey	10,000	Hard	(China) Ye Qiuyu	(Czech Republic) Kateřina Kramperová (Romania) Daiana Negreanu	7–6^{(3)}, 5–7, [10–6]
Win	5–1	Mar 2015	ITF Jiangmen, China	10,000	Hard	(China) Zhu Aiwen	(China) Xin Yuan (China) Ye Qiuyu	4–6, 7–5, [10–4]
Loss	5–2	Mar 2015	ITF Tianjin, China	25,000	Hard	(China) Chen Jiahui	(China) Liu Wanting (China) Lu Jingjing	7–6^{(4)}, 6–7^{(4)}, [4–10]
Loss	5–3	Aug 2015	ITF Yeongwol, South Korea	10,000	Hard	(China) Zhang Yukun	(South Korea) Han Sung-hee (South Korea) Hong Seung-yeon	5–7, 6–3, [7–10]
Win	6–3	Sep 2015	Zhuhai Open, China	50,000	Hard	(China) Xu Shilin	(Russia) Irina Khromacheva (United Kingdom) Emily Webley-Smith	3–6, 6–2, [10–4]
Win	7–3	Feb 2016	Launceston International, Australia	75,000	Hard	(China) Zhu Lin	(Ukraine) Nadiia Kichenok (Luxembourg) Mandy Minella	2–6, 7–5, [10–7]
Loss	7–4	Apr 2016	ITF Kashiwa, Japan	25,000	Hard	(China) Zhu Lin	(China) Yang Zhaoxuan (China) Zhang Kailin	5–7, 6–2, [9–11]
Win	8–4	May 2016	Zhengzhou Open, China	50,000	Hard	(China) Xun Fangying	(Uzbekistan) Akgul Amanmuradova (Slovakia) Michaela Hončová	1–6, 6–2, [10–7]
Win	9–4	Jun 2016	ITF Helsingborg, Sweden	25,000	Clay	(China) Tian Ran	(Sweden) Cornelia Lister (Russia) Anna Morgina	6–4, 6–3
Win	10–4	Nov 2016	Shenzhen Longhua Open, China	100,000	Hard	(Serbia) Nina Stojanović	(China) Han Xinyun (China) Zhu Lin	6–4, 7–6^{(6)}
Win	11–4	Apr 2017	ITF Sharm El Sheikh, Egypt	15,000	Hard	(Montenegro) Ana Veselinović	(Egypt) Ola Abou Zekry (Egypt) Sandra Samir	6–3, 7–5
Win	12–4	Apr 2017	ITF Sharm El Sheikh, Egypt	15,000	Hard	(Montenegro) Ana Veselinović	(Romania) Laura-Ioana Andrei (Austria) Melanie Klaffner	2–6, 7–5, [13–11]
Loss	12–5	Jul 2017	ITF Naiman, China	25,000	Hard	(China) Lu Jingjing	(China) Gao Xinyu (China) Xun Fangying	7–6^{(5)}, 4–6, [8–10]
Win	13–5	Aug 2018	Jinan Open, China	60,000	Hard	(China) Wang Xinyu	(Chinese Taipei) Hsieh Yu-chieh (China) Lu Jingjing	6–3, 6–7^{(5)}, [10–2]
Win	14–5	Aug 2018	ITF Tsukuba, China	25,000	Hard	(Japan) Akiko Omae	(Australia) Naiktha Bains (Japan) Hiroko Kuwata	6–0, 7–6^{(4)}
Loss	14–6	Mar 2019	Kōfu International Open, Japan	W25	Hard	(China) Xun Fangying	(Chinese Taipei) Chang Kai-chen (Chinese Taipei) Hsu Ching-wen	3–6, 4–6
Win	15–6	May 2019	Jin'an Open, China	W60	Hard	(Indonesia) Beatrice Gumulya	(Japan) Mai Minokoshi (Japan) Erika Sema	6–1, 7–5
Win	16–6	Jun 2019	ITF Hengyang, China	W25	Hard	(China) Zhang Ying	(China) Sun Xuliu (China) Zhao Qianqian	6–1, 6–0
Loss	16–7	Feb 2020	Rancho Santa Fe Open, United States	W25	Hard	(Hong Kong) Eudice Chong	(United States) Kayla Day (United States) Sophia Whittle	2–6, 7–5, [7–10]
Loss	16–8	Jan 2021	ITF Fujairah City, United Arab Emirates	W25	Hard	(Chinese Taipei) Liang En-shuo	(Switzerland) Viktorija Golubic (Turkey) Çağla Büyükakçay	7–5, 4–6, [4–10]
Win	17–8	Jan 2021	Open Andrézieux-Bouthéon, France	W60	Hard (i)	(China) Lu Jiajing	(Poland) Paula Kania-Choduń (Ukraine) Katarina Zavatska	6–3, 6–4
Loss	17–9	Jun 2022	Open Madrid Osuna, Spain	W60	Hard	(China) Lu Jiajing	(Kazakhstan) Anna Danilina (Russia) Anastasia Tikhonova	4–6, 2–6
Loss	17–10	Jul 2023	ITF Naiman, China	W25	Hard	(China) Dang Yiming	(China) Feng Shuo (China) Wu Meixu	6–1, 3–6, [5–10]
Win	18–10	Feb 2024	Burnie International, Australia	W75	Hard	(China) Tang Qianhui	(China) Ma Yexin (Australia) Alana Parnaby	6–4, 7–5
Win	19–10	Jul 2025	ITF Rio Claro, Brazil	W35	Clay	(China) Dang Yiming	(Brazil) Luiza Fullana (Argentina) Carla Markus	6–1, 6–2
Loss	19–11	Jul 2025	ITF São Paulo, Brazil	W35	Clay	(China) Dang Yiming	(Mexico) Marian Gómez Pezuela Cano (Peru) Lucciana Pérez	walkover
Win	20–11	Nov 2025	Keio Challenger, Japan	W50	Clay	(China) Dang Yiming	(Japan) Natsumi Kawaguchi (Japan) Hayu Kinoshita	6–2, 3–6, [10–4]
Win	21–11	Jan 2026	ITF Weston, United States	W35	Clay	(China) Dang Yiming	(United States) Hanna Chang (United States) Victoria Hu	6–3, 2–6, [10–8]
Loss	21–12	Mar 2026	Kōfu International Open, Japan	W75	Hard	(China) Dang Yiming	(Japan) Momoko Kobori (Japan) Ayano Shimizu	4–6, 4–6
