= Emma Raducanu career statistics =

Tennis career statistics about British player Emma Raducanu

Career finals
Discipline	Type	Won	Lost	Total
Singles	Grand Slam	1	0	1
Singles	WTA Finals	–	–	–
Singles	WTA 1000	–	–	–
Singles	WTA 500	–	1	1
Singles	WTA 250	–	1	1
Singles	Olympics	–	–	–
Singles	Total	1	2	3
Doubles	Grand Slam	–	–	–
Doubles	WTA Finals	–	–	–
Doubles	WTA 1000	–	–	–
Doubles	WTA 500	–	–	–
Doubles	WTA 250	–	–	–
Doubles	Olympics	–	–	–
Doubles	Total	–	–	–

This is a list of career statistics of British tennis player Emma Raducanu. To date, she has won one WTA title.

== Performance timelines ==
Key
W	F	SF	QF	#R	RR	Q#	DNQ	A	NH

(W) winner; (F) finalist; (SF) semifinalist; (QF) quarterfinalist; (#R) rounds 4, 3, 2, 1; (RR) round-robin stage; (Q#) qualification round; (DNQ) did not qualify; (A) absent; (NH) not held; (SR) strike rate (events won / competed); (W–L) win–loss record.
To avoid confusion and double counting, these charts are updated at the conclusion of a tournament or when the player's participation has ended.

Only main-draw results in WTA Tour, Grand Slam tournaments, Billie Jean King Cup (Fed Cup), United Cup, Hopman Cup and Olympic Games are included in win–loss records.

=== Singles ===
Current through the 2026 WTA Tour.

Tournament	2018	2019	2020	2021	2022	2023	2024	2025	2026	SR	W–L	Win %
Grand Slam tournaments
Australian Open	A	A	A	A	2R	2R	2R	3R	2R	0 / 5	6–5	55%
French Open	A	A	A	A	2R	A	A	2R	1R	0 / 3	2–3	40%
Wimbledon	Q1	Q1	NH	4R	2R	A	4R	3R	A	0 / 4	9–4	69%
US Open	A	A	A	W	1R	A	1R	3R	A	1 / 4	9–3	75%
Win–loss	0–0	0–0	0–0	10–1	3–4	1–1	4–3	7–4	1–2	1 / 16	26–15	63%
National representation
BJK Cup	A	A	A	NH	QR	A	SF	A	A	0 / 1	6–1	86%
WTA 1000 tournaments
Qatar Open	A	NTI	A	NTI	A	NTI	1R	1R	1R	0 / 3	0–3	0%
Dubai Championships	NTI	A	NTI	A	NTI	A	A	2R	1R	0 / 2	1–2	33%
Indian Wells Open	A	A	NH	2R	3R	4R	3R	1R	3R	0 / 6	7–6	54%
Miami Open	A	A	NH	A	2R	1R	A	QF	A	0 / 3	4–3	57%
Madrid Open	A	A	NH	A	3R	A	1R	2R	A	0 / 3	3–3	50%
Italian Open	A	A	A	A	1R	A	A	4R	A	0 / 2	3–2	60%
Canadian Open	A	A	NH	A	1R	A	A	3R	A	0 / 2	2–2	50%
Cincinnati Open	A	A	A	A	3R	A	A	3R	A	0 / 2	3–2	60%
China Open	A	A	NH			A	A	3R	A	0 / 1	1–1	50%
Wuhan Open	A	A	NH				A	1R	A	0 / 1	0–1	0%
Win–loss	0–0	0–0	0–0	0–1	5–6	3–2	2–3	13–10	1–3	0 / 25	24–25	49%
Career statistics
	2018	2019	2020	2021	2022	2023	2024	2025	2026	SR	W–L	Win %
Tournaments	0	0	0	7	18	5	13	22	10	Career total: 75		
Titles	0	0	0	1	0	0	0	0	0	Career total: 1		
Finals	0	0	0	1	0	0	0	0	2	Career total: 3		
Hard win–loss	0–0	0–0	0–0	9–4	10–12	5–4	12–8	17–15	7–7	1 / 51	60–50	55%
Clay win–loss	0–0	0–0	0–0	0–0	6–5	0–1	4–2	6–4	0–2	0 / 13	16–14	53%
Grass win–loss	0–0	0–0	0–0	3–2	1–2	0–0	7–3	5–3	4–1	0 / 11	20–11	65%
Overall win–loss	0–0	0–0	0–0	12–6	17–19	5–5	23–13	28–22	11–10	1 / 75	96–75	56%
Win %	–	–	–	67%	47%	50%	64%	56%	52%	Career total: 56%		
Year-end ranking	692	503	343	19	75	285	58	29	108	$6,562,478		

== Grand Slam tournament finals ==
=== Singles: 1 (title) ===
Result	Year	Tournament	Surface	Opponent	Score
Win	2021	US Open	Hard	(Canada) Leylah Fernandez	6–4, 6–3

== WTA Tour finals ==
=== Singles: 3 (1 title, 2 runner-ups) ===
Legend Grand Slam (1–0) WTA 500 (0–1) WTA 250 (0–1)	Finals by surface Hard (1–1) Grass (0–1)	Finals by setting Outdoor (1–1) Indoor (0–1)

Result	W–L	Date	Tournament	Tier	Surface	Opponent	Score
Win	1–0	Sep 2021	US Open, United States	Grand Slam	Hard	(Canada) Leylah Fernandez	6–4, 6–3
Loss	1–1	Feb 2026	Transylvania Open, Romania	WTA 250	Hard (i)	(Romania) Sorana Cîrstea	0–6, 2–6
Loss	1–2	Jun 2026	Queen's Club Championships, UK	WTA 500	Grass	(Croatia) Donna Vekić	0–6, 6–7^{(6–8)}

== WTA 125 finals ==
=== Singles: 1 (runner-up) ===
Result	Date	Tournament	Surface	Opponent	Score
Loss	Aug 2021	Chicago Challenger, United States	Hard	(Denmark) Clara Tauson	1–6, 6–2, 4–6

== ITF Circuit finals ==
=== Singles: 5 (3 titles, 2 runner-ups) ===
Legend W25 tournaments (1–1) W15 tournaments (2–1)	Finals by surface Hard (3–2)

Result	W–L	Date	Tournament	Tier	Surface	Opponent	Score
Win	1–0	May 2018	ITF Tiberias, Israel	W15	Hard	(Belgium) Hélène Scholsen	7–6^{(7–3)}, 6–4
Win	2–0	Oct 2018	ITF Antalya, Turkey	W15	Hard	(Czech Republic) Johana Marková	6–4, 6–2
Loss	2–1	Mar 2019	ITF Tel Aviv, Israel	W15	Hard	(Italy) Corinna Dentoni	4–6, 3–6
Win	3–1	Dec 2019	ITF Pune, India	W25	Hard	(United Kingdom) Naiktha Bains	3–6, 6–1, 6–4
Loss	3–2	Mar 2020	ITF Sunderland, UK	W25	Hard (i)	(Bulgaria) Viktoriya Tomova	6–4, 4–6, 3–6

== Career Grand Slam statistics ==
=== Best Grand Slam tournament results details ===
Australian Open
2025 Australian Open (ranked 61)
Round	Opponent	Rank	Score
1R	Ekaterina Alexandrova (26)	31	7–6^{(7–4)}, 7–6^{(7–2)}
2R	(United States) Amanda Anisimova	35	6–3, 7–5
3R	(Poland) Iga Świątek (2)	2	1–6, 0–6

Wimbledon
2021 Wimbledon (WC – ranked 338)
Round	Opponent	Rank	Score
1R	(Russia) Vitalia Diatchenko (Q)	150	7–6^{(7–4)}, 6–0
2R	(Czech Republic) Markéta Vondroušová	42	6–2, 6–4
3R	(Romania) Sorana Cîrstea	45	6–3, 7–5
4R	(Australia) Ajla Tomljanović	75	4–6, 0–3 ret.
2024 Wimbledon (WC – ranked 135)
Round	Opponent	Rank	Score
1R	(Mexico) Renata Zarazúa (LL)	98	7–6^{(7–0)}, 6–3
2R	(Belgium) Elise Mertens	33	6–1, 6–2
3R	(Greece) Maria Sakkari (9)	9	6–2, 6–3
4R	(New Zealand) Lulu Sun (Q)	123	2–6, 7–5, 2–6

French Open
2022 French Open (12th seed, ranked 12)
Round	Opponent	Rank	Score
1R	(Czech Republic) Linda Nosková (Q)	184	6–7^{(4–7)}, 7–5, 6–1
2R	(Belarus) Aliaksandra Sasnovich	47	6–3, 1–6, 1–6
2025 French Open (ranked 41)
Round	Opponent	Rank	Score
1R	(China) Xinyu Wang	43	7–5, 4–6, 6–3
2R	(Poland) Iga Świątek (5)	5	1–6, 2–6

US Open
2021 US Open (Q – ranked 150)
Round	Opponent	Rank	Score
Q1	(Netherlands) Bibiane Schoofs (PR)	285	6–1, 6–2
Q2	(Georgia (country)) Mariam Bolkvadze	167	6–3, 7–5
Q3	(Egypt) Mayar Sherif (4)	96	6–1, 6–4
1R	(Switzerland) Stefanie Vögele (LL)	128	6–2, 6–3
2R	(China) Zhang Shuai	49	6–2, 6–4
3R	(Spain) Sara Sorribes Tormo	41	6–0, 6–1
4R	(United States) Shelby Rogers	43	6–2, 6–1
QF	(Switzerland) Belinda Bencic (11)	12	6–3, 6–4
SF	(Greece) Maria Sakkari (17)	18	6–1, 6–4
W	(Canada) Leylah Fernandez	73	6–4, 6–3

== WTA Tour career earnings ==
Current through 15 June 2026

Year	Titles			Earnings ($)	Rank
Year	Grand Slam	WTA	Total	Earnings ($)	Rank
2018	–	–	–	12,741	524
2019	–	–	–	14,606	545
2020	–	–	–	2,351	657
2021	1	–	1	2,807,446	6
2022	–	–	–	696,277	58
2023	–	–	–	237,627	177
2024	–	–	–	671,070	88
2025	–	–	–	1,450,476	34
2026	–	–	–	605,100	57
Career	1	0	1	6,562,478	129

== Open Era records ==
Tournament	Year	Record accomplished	Player tied	Ref
US Open	2021	Wins a Grand Slam singles title as a qualifier	Stands alone	
US Open	2021	Makes a Grand Slam singles final as a qualifier	Maja Chwalińska	
US Open	2021	Wins a Grand Slam singles title with two or fewer major main draw appearances	Stands alone	
US Open	2021	Wins a Grand Slam singles title in their second major main draw appearance	Stands alone	
US Open	2021	Wins a singles title in first US Open main draw appearance	Bianca Andreescu	

== Wins against top 10 players ==
- Raducanu has a 3–17 record against players who were, at the time the match was played, ranked in the top 10.

Season	2024	2025	2026	Total
Wins	2	1	0	3

No.	Opponent	Rk	Event	Surface	Rd	Score	Rk	Years	Ref
1.	(United States) Jessica Pegula	5	Eastbourne International, UK	Grass	2R	4–6, 7–6^{(8–6)}, 7–5	168	2024	
2.	(Greece) Maria Sakkari	9	Wimbledon, United Kingdom	Grass	3R	6–2, 6–3	135	2024	
3.	(United States) Emma Navarro	10	Miami Open, United States	Hard	2R	7–6^{(8–6)}, 2–6, 7–6^{(7–3)}	60	2025	

- Key: (Rk) first use, opponent rank; (Rd) round; (Rk) 2nd use, player rank; (Ref) reference; (F) final; (SF) semifinal; (QF) quarterfinal; (#R) rounds 4, 3, 2, 1; (RR) round-robin stage; (Q#) qualifying rounds or stages (3), 2, 1.

== Double bagel matches ==
Result	Year	W–L	Tournament	Tier	Surface	Opponent	Rank	Rd	ER
Win	2018	1–0	ITF Nanjing 3, China	W15	Hard	(Japan) Satsuke Koike	–	Q1	–
Win	2018	2–0	ITF Nanjing 4, China	W15	Hard	(China) He Yunqi	–	Q1	–
Win	2018	3–0	ITF Lisbon, Portugal	W25	Hard	(Portugal) Miriam Medina Cardena	–	Q1	830
Win	2019	4–0	ITF Pune, India	W25	Hard	(Ukraine) Valeriya Strakhova	369	1R	522
