= 2021 Chicago Challenger =

- Date: August 16–22
- Edition: 2nd
- Category: WTA 125K series
- Draw: 32S / 16D
- Prize money: $125,000
- Surface: Hard, outdoor
- Location: Chicago, United States
- Venue: XS Tennis Village

Champions

Singles
- (Denmark) Clara Tauson

Doubles
- (Japan) Eri Hozumi / (Thailand) Peangtarn Plipuech
← 2018 ·	Chicago Challenger	· 2023 →

The 2021 Chicago Challenger was a professional tennis tournament played on outdoor hard courts. It was part of the 2021 WTA 125K series. It was the second edition of the tournament which took place from August 16 to 22, 2021 in Chicago, United States.

== Champions ==
=== Singles ===
- (Denmark) Clara Tauson def. (United Kingdom) Emma Raducanu, 6–1, 2–6, 6–4

=== Doubles ===
- (Japan) Eri Hozumi / (Thailand) Peangtarn Plipuech def. (Germany) Mona Barthel / (Chinese Taipei) Hsieh Yu-chieh, 7–5, 6–2

== Singles main draw entrants ==
=== Seeds ===
Country	Player	Rank^{1}	Seed
BEL	Alison Van Uytvanck	60	1
MNE	Danka Kovinić	66	2
USA	Ann Li	69	3
UKR	Anhelina Kalinina	78	4
USA	Madison Brengle	79	5
USA	Amanda Anisimova	86	6
CRO	Ana Konjuh	88	7
RUS	Varvara Gracheva	89	8

- ^{1} Rankings are as of 9 August 2021.

=== Other entrants ===
The following players received wildcards into the singles main draw:

- (United States) Hailey Baptiste
- (United States) Whitney Osuigwe
- (United Kingdom) Emma Raducanu
- (United States) CoCo Vandeweghe

The following players received entry using protected rankings:

- (Serbia) Ivana Jorović
- (Ukraine) Kateryna Kozlova

The following players received entry from the qualifying draw:

- (United Kingdom) Harriet Dart
- (Russia) Vitalia Diatchenko
- (United States) Caroline Dolehide
- (Belgium) Maryna Zanevska

=== Withdrawals ===
Before the tournament

- (Germany) Mona Barthel → replaced by (France) Harmony Tan
- (Japan) Nao Hibino → replaced by (Croatia) Ana Konjuh
- (Estonia) Kaia Kanepi → replaced by (Russia) Anna Kalinskaya
- (Ukraine) Marta Kostyuk → replaced by (Spain) Nuria Párrizas Díaz
- (Russia) Anastasia Potapova → replaced by (Germany) Jule Niemeier
- (Serbia) Nina Stojanović → replaced by (Belgium) Greet Minnen

== Doubles main draw entrants ==
=== Seeds ===
Country	Player	Country	Player	Rank^{1}	Seed
USA	Kaitlyn Christian	NED	Lesley Pattinama Kerkhove	152	1
GER	Julia Lohoff	CZE	Renata Voráčová	170	2
GBR	Harriet Dart	USA	Caroline Dolehide	180	3
ITA	Sara Errani	GEO	Oksana Kalashnikova	202	4

- Rankings are as of 9 August 2021

=== Other entrants ===
The following pair received a wildcard into the doubles main draw:

- (United States) Abigail Forbes / (United States) Dalayna Hewitt

The following pairs received entry into the doubles main draw using protected rankings:

- (Germany) Mona Barthel / (Chinese Taipei) Hsieh Yu-chieh
- (Indonesia) Beatrice Gumulya / (Indonesia) Aldila Sutjiadi

=== Withdrawals ===
Before the tournament

- (Japan) Eri Hozumi / (Russia) Valeria Savinykh → replaced by (Japan) Eri Hozumi / (Thailand) Peangtarn Plipuech
