= 2021 Chicago Challenger – Doubles =

Doubles
- 2021 Chicago Challenger

Final
- Champions: (Japan) Eri Hozumi (Thailand) Peangtarn Plipuech
- Runners-up: (Germany) Mona Barthel (Chinese Taipei) Hsieh Yu-chieh
- Score: 7–5, 6–2

Events
Singles	Doubles
← 2018 ·	Chicago Challenger	· 2023 →

Mona Barthel and Kristýna Plíšková were the defending champions, but Plíšková chose not to participate.

Eri Hozumi and Peangtarn Plipuech won the title, defeating Barthel and Hsieh Yu-chieh in the final, 7–5, 6–2.

== Seeds ==
1. (United States) Kaitlyn Christian / (Netherlands) Lesley Pattinama Kerkhove (first round)
2. (Germany) Julia Lohoff / (Czech Republic) Renata Voráčová (first round)
3. (United Kingdom) Harriet Dart / (United States) Caroline Dolehide (first round)
4. (Italy) Sara Errani / (Georgia (country)) Oksana Kalashnikova (first round)

== Draw ==
=== Key ===
- Q = Qualifier
- WC = Wild card
- LL = Lucky loser
- Alt = Alternate
- SE = Special exempt
- PR = Protected ranking
- ITF = ITF entry
- JE = Junior exempt
- w/o = Walkover
- r = Retired
- d = Defaulted
- SR = Special ranking

=== Draw ===
First round
1	(United States) K Christian (Netherlands) L Pattinama Kerkhove	4	4
(Belgium) G Minnen (Belgium) A Van Uytvanck	6	6
PR	(Indonesia) B Gumulya (Indonesia) A Sutjiadi	6	6
(United Kingdom) S Murray Sharan (Belgium) K Zimmermann	3	0
4	(Italy) S Errani (Georgia (country)) O Kalashnikova	6	3	[6]
(Japan) E Hozumi (Thailand) P Plipuech	0	6	[10]
WC	(United States) A Forbes (United States) D Hewitt	1	4
(Hungary) D Gálfi (Russia) K Rakhimova	6	6
(France) E Lechemia (United States) I Neel	4	3
(Norway) U Eikeri (United States) C Harrison	6	6
(France) C Burel (France) K Mladenovic	6	6
3	(United Kingdom) H Dart (United States) C Dolehide	1	2
(Switzerland) L Küng (Belarus) L Marozava	6^{3}	3
PR	(Germany) M Barthel (Chinese Taipei) Y-c Hsieh	7^{7}	6
(Georgia (country)) E Gorgodze (India) A Raina	6	2	[10]
2	(Germany) J Lohoff (Czech Republic) R Voráčová	2	6	[8]

Quarterfinals
(Belgium) G Minnen (Belgium) A Van Uytvanck	6	6^{6}	[10]
PR	(Indonesia) B Gumulya (Indonesia) A Sutjiadi	2	7^{8}	[4]
(Japan) E Hozumi (Thailand) P Plipuech	5	6	[11]
(Hungary) D Gálfi (Russia) K Rakhimova	7	4	[9]
(Norway) U Eikeri (United States) C Harrison	5	4
(France) C Burel (France) K Mladenovic	7	6
PR	(Germany) M Barthel (Chinese Taipei) Y-c Hsieh	7	6
(Georgia (country)) E Gorgodze (India) A Raina	5	2

Semifinals
(Belgium) G Minnen (Belgium) A Van Uytvanck	7	3	[4]
(Japan) E Hozumi (Thailand) P Plipuech	5	6	[10]
(France) C Burel (France) K Mladenovic	4	7^{7}	[10]
PR	(Germany) M Barthel (Chinese Taipei) Y-c Hsieh	6	6^{4}	[12]

Final
(Japan) E Hozumi (Thailand) P Plipuech	7	6
PR	(Germany) M Barthel (Chinese Taipei) Y-c Hsieh	5	2
