= 2018 Oracle Challenger Series – Chicago – Men's doubles =

Chicago – Men's doubles
- 2018 Oracle Challenger Series – Chicago

Final
- Champions: (United Kingdom) Luke Bambridge (United Kingdom) Neal Skupski
- Runners-up: (India) Leander Paes (Mexico) Miguel Ángel Reyes-Varela
- Score: 6–3, 6–4

Events
Singles	men	women
Doubles	men	women
- Oracle Challenger Series – Chicago

This was the first edition of the tournament.

Luke Bambridge and Neal Skupski won the title after defeating Leander Paes and Miguel Ángel Reyes-Varela 6–3, 6–4 in the final.

== Seeds ==
1. (India) Leander Paes / (Mexico) Miguel Ángel Reyes-Varela (final)
2. (United Kingdom) Luke Bambridge / (United Kingdom) Neal Skupski (champions)
3. (El Salvador) Marcelo Arévalo / (Venezuela) Roberto Maytín (quarterfinals)
4. (United States) James Cerretani / (United States) Robert Galloway (quarterfinals)

== Draw ==
Key

- Q = Qualifier
- WC = Wild card
- LL = Lucky loser
- Alt = Alternate
- ITF = ITF entry
- PR = Protected ranking
- SR = Special ranking
- SE = Special exempt
- JE = Junior exempt
- JR = Junior Accelerator Programme entrant
- CO = College Accelerator Programme entrant
- NG = Next Gen Accelerator Program entrant
- w/o = Walkover
- r = Retired
- d = Defaulted

First round
1	(India) L Paes (Mexico) MÁ Reyes-Varela	7^{7}	6^{4}	[10]
(South Africa) R Roelofse (Australia) J-P Smith	6^{4}	7^{7}	[7]
WC	(United States) M Giron (United States) T-S Kwiatkowski	2	6	[10]
(Uzbekistan) D Istomin (France) H Nys	6	4	[4]
3	(El Salvador) M Arévalo (Venezuela) R Maytín	6^{3}	7^{7}	[11]
(Mexico) H Hach Verdugo (Sweden) A Siljeström	7^{7}	6^{5}	[9]
WC	(United States) B Fratangelo (United States) T Paul	3	6^{3}
(Philippines) R Gonzales (United States) N Lammons	6	7^{7}
(United States) E King (United States) N Pasha	6	4	[10]
(Japan) T Matsui (Denmark) F Nielsen	4	6	[2]
WC	(United States) JC Aragone (United States) C Eubanks	1	3
4	(United States) J Cerretani (United States) R Galloway	6	6
Alt	(United States) S Bangoura (Belgium) J De Loore	6	2	[10]
(Dominican Republic) V Estrella Burgos (Sweden) E Ymer	3	6	[4]
(United States) M Krueger (United States) J Withrow	3	4
2	(United Kingdom) L Bambridge (United Kingdom) N Skupski	6	6

Quarterfinals
1	(India) L Paes (Mexico) MÁ Reyes-Varela	7^{7}	6
WC	(United States) M Giron (United States) T-S Kwiatkowski	6^{4}	1
3	(El Salvador) M Arévalo (Venezuela) R Maytín	6^{3}	3
(Philippines) R Gonzales (United States) N Lammons	7^{7}	6
(United States) E King (United States) N Pasha	7^{8}	3	[10]
4	(United States) J Cerretani (United States) R Galloway	6^{6}	6	[7]
Alt	(United States) S Bangoura (Belgium) J De Loore	1	5
2	(United Kingdom) L Bambridge (United Kingdom) N Skupski	6	7

Semifinals
1	(India) L Paes (Mexico) MÁ Reyes-Varela	6^{5}	7^{7}	[10]
(Philippines) R Gonzales (United States) N Lammons	7^{7}	6^{4}	[5]
(United States) E King (United States) N Pasha	6^{3}	3
2	(United Kingdom) L Bambridge (United Kingdom) N Skupski	7^{7}	6

Final
1	(India) L Paes (Mexico) MÁ Reyes-Varela	3	4
2	(United Kingdom) L Bambridge (United Kingdom) N Skupski	6	6
