= 2018 Oracle Challenger Series – Chicago – Men's singles =

Chicago – Men's singles
- 2018 Oracle Challenger Series – Chicago

Final
- Champion: (Uzbekistan) Denis Istomin
- Runner-up: (United States) Reilly Opelka
- Score: 6–4, 6–2

Events
Singles	men	women
Doubles	men	women
- Oracle Challenger Series – Chicago

This was the first edition of the tournament.

Denis Istomin won the title after defeating Reilly Opelka 6–4, 6–2 in the final.

== Seeds ==
1. (Italy) Andreas Seppi (first round)
2. (Uzbekistan) Denis Istomin (champion)
3. (Canada) Vasek Pospisil (first round)
4. (Serbia) Viktor Troicki (first round)
5. (United States) Michael Mmoh (second round)
6. (Belgium) Ruben Bemelmans (quarterfinals)
7. (Sweden) Elias Ymer (first round)
8. (United States) Noah Rubin (quarterfinals)

== Draw ==
Key

- Q = Qualifier
- WC = Wild card
- LL = Lucky loser
- Alt = Alternate
- ITF = ITF entry
- PR = Protected ranking
- SR = Special ranking
- SE = Special exempt
- JE = Junior exempt
- JR = Junior Accelerator Programme entrant
- CO = College Accelerator Programme entrant
- NG = Next Gen Accelerator Program entrant
- w/o = Walkover
- r = Retired
- d = Defaulted

=== Finals ===
Semifinals
Alt	(Germany) Dominik Köpfer	3	6^{3}
(United States) Reilly Opelka	6	7^{7}
(United States) Bjorn Fratangelo	1	2
2	(Uzbekistan) Denis Istomin	6	6

Final
(United States) Reilly Opelka	4	2
2	(Uzbekistan) Denis Istomin	6	6

=== Top half ===
First round
1/WC	(Italy) A Seppi	3	6^{5}
Q	(United States) A Sarkissian	6	7^{7}
(Colombia) DE Galán	6^{5}	3
(United States) JC Aragone	7^{7}	6
Alt	(Germany) D Köpfer	6	6
Q	(France) V Millot	3	4
(United States) M Krueger	3	6	6
7	(Sweden) E Ymer	6	3	2
3	(Canada) V Pospisil	2	2
Alt	(United States) D Young	6	6
(Australia) J-P Smith	2	6	6
Alt	(Dominican Republic) R Cid Subervi	6	1	4
(Ecuador) R Quiroz	3	2
(United States) R Opelka	6	6
(United States) C Eubanks	7	4	4
5	(United States) M Mmoh	5	6	6

Second round
Q	(United States) A Sarkissian	6	6^{4}	6^{3}
(United States) JC Aragone	2	7^{7}	7^{7}
Alt	(Germany) D Köpfer	4	7^{7}	6
(United States) M Krueger	6	6^{4}	2
Alt	(United States) D Young	6	6
(Australia) J-P Smith	3	4
(United States) R Opelka	6	6
5	(United States) M Mmoh	4	4

Quarterfinals
(United States) JC Aragone	4	2
Alt	(Germany) D Köpfer	6	6
Alt	(United States) D Young	6	2	6^{5}
(United States) R Opelka	3	6	7^{7}

Semifinals
Alt	(Germany) D Köpfer	3	6^{3}
(United States) R Opelka	6	7^{7}

=== Bottom half ===
First round
8	(United States) N Rubin	6	3	6
(United States) E King	4	6	3
(Australia) A Popyrin	6	7
(Dominican Republic) V Estrella Burgos	3	5
Alt	(United States) E Escobedo	6^{3}	6	1
Q	(United States) S Bangoura	7^{7}	4	6
(United States) B Fratangelo	2	6	6
4	(Serbia) V Troicki	6	2	0
6	(Belgium) R Bemelmans	7	7^{8}
Q	(France) H Nys	5	6^{6}
LL	(Japan) K Uchida	6	6
WC	(United States) T-S Kwiatkowski	1	3
WC	(United States) T Paul	6	6
LL	(South Africa) R Roelofse	3	2
(El Salvador) M Arévalo	4	1
2	(Uzbekistan) D Istomin	6	6

Second round
8	(United States) N Rubin	5	6	7
(Australia) A Popyrin	7	2	5
Q	(United States) S Bangoura	4	6	5
(United States) B Fratangelo	6	1	7
6	(Belgium) R Bemelmans	6	6
LL	(Japan) K Uchida	3	4
WC	(United States) T Paul	5	3
2	(Uzbekistan) D Istomin	7	6

Quarterfinals
8	(United States) N Rubin	1	4
(United States) B Fratangelo	6	6
6	(Belgium) R Bemelmans	3	4
2	(Uzbekistan) D Istomin	6	6

Semifinals
(United States) B Fratangelo	1	2
2	(Uzbekistan) D Istomin	6	6
