= 2022 Western & Southern Open – Women's singles =

Women's singles
- 2022 Western & Southern Open

Final
- Champion: (France) Caroline Garcia
- Runner-up: (Czech Republic) Petra Kvitová
- Score: 6–2, 6–4

Details
- Draw: 56
- Seeds: 16

Events
Singles	men	women
Doubles	men	women
← 2021 ·	Cincinnati Masters	· 2023 →

Caroline Garcia defeated Petra Kvitová in the final, 6–2, 6–4 to win the women's singles tennis title at the 2022 Cincinnati Masters. It was her third WTA 1000 title, and her first since 2017. Garcia was the first qualifier to reach and to win the final of a WTA 1000 event.

Ashleigh Barty was the reigning champion, but retired from professional tennis in March 2022.

This was the penultimate professional tournament of 23-time major champion and former world No. 1 Serena Williams; she lost to Emma Raducanu in the first round.

== Seeds ==
The top eight seeds received a bye into the second round.

1. (Poland) Iga Świątek (third round)
2. (Estonia) Anett Kontaveit (third round)
3. (Spain) Paula Badosa (second round)
4. (Greece) Maria Sakkari (second round)
5. (Tunisia) Ons Jabeur (third round)
6. Aryna Sabalenka (semifinals)
7. (United States) Jessica Pegula (quarterfinals)
8. (Spain) Garbiñe Muguruza (second round)

9. Daria Kasatkina (first round)
10. (United Kingdom) Emma Raducanu (third round)
11. (United States) Coco Gauff (first round, retired)
12. (Switzerland) Belinda Bencic (first round)
13. (Canada) Leylah Fernandez (first round)
14. (Czech Republic) Karolína Plíšková (second round)
15. (Romania) Simona Halep (second round, withdrew)
16. (Latvia) Jeļena Ostapenko (second round)

Click on the seed number of a player to go to their draw section.

== Draw ==
=== Key ===
- Q = Qualifier
- WC = Wild card
- LL = Lucky loser
- Alt = Alternate
- SE = Special exempt
- PR = Protected ranking
- ITF = ITF entry
- JE = Junior exempt
- w/o = Walkover
- r = Retired
- d = Defaulted
- SR = Special ranking

=== Finals ===
Quarterfinals
(United States) Madison Keys	6	6
(Kazakhstan) Elena Rybakina	2	4
Q	(Australia) Ajla Tomljanović	2	3
(Czech Republic) Petra Kvitová	6	6
7	(United States) Jessica Pegula	1	5
Q	(France) Caroline Garcia	6	7
6	Aryna Sabalenka	6	7^{7}
(China) Zhang Shuai	4	6^{1}

Semifinals
(United States) Madison Keys	7^{8}	4	3
(Czech Republic) Petra Kvitová	6^{6}	6	6
Q	(France) Caroline Garcia	6	4	6
6	Aryna Sabalenka	2	6	1

Final
(Czech Republic) Petra Kvitová	2	4
Q	(France) Caroline Garcia	6	6

=== Top half ===
==== Section 1 ====
First round
WC	(United States) S Stephens	6	6
(France) A Cornet	1	0
(United States) M Keys	7	6
(Kazakhstan) Y Putintseva	5	3
(Brazil) B Haddad Maia	4	4
16	(Latvia) J Ostapenko	6	6
11	(United States) C Gauff	5	0^{r}
Q	(Czech Republic) M Bouzková	7	1
(Spain) S Sorribes Tormo	1	6^{2}
(United States) A Riske-Amritraj	6	7^{7}
(Kazakhstan) E Rybakina	6	6
(Egypt) M Sherif	3	2

Second round
1	(Poland) I Świątek	6	7
WC	(United States) S Stephens	4	5
(United States) M Keys	6	7
16	(Latvia) J Ostapenko	4	5
Q	(Czech Republic) M Bouzková
(United States) A Riske-Amritraj	w/o
(Kazakhstan) E Rybakina	6	6
8	(Spain) G Muguruza	3	1

Third round
1	(Poland) I Świątek	3	4
(United States) M Keys	6	6
(United States) A Riske-Amritraj	2	4
(Kazakhstan) E Rybakina	6	6

Quarterfinals
(United States) M Keys	6	6
(Kazakhstan) E Rybakina	2	4

==== Section 2 ====
First round
Q	(United States) T Townsend	4	6	5
Q	(Australia) A Tomljanović	6	3	7
(Czech Republic) B Krejčíková	3	3
V Kudermetova	6	6
LL	A Potapova	4	6	3
15	(Romania) S Halep	6	3	6
12	(Switzerland) B Bencic	2	7^{7}	4
(Romania) S Cîrstea	6	6^{3}	6
(Switzerland) J Teichmann	7^{7}	6^{6}	3
(Czech Republic) P Kvitová	6^{2}	7^{8}	6
WC	(United States) C McNally	6	3	7^{7}
A Sasnovich	3	6	6^{2}

Second round
3	(Spain) P Badosa	7^{7}	0	2
Q	(Australia) A Tomljanović	6^{3}	6	6
V Kudermetova	w/o
15	(Romania) S Halep
(Romania) S Cîrstea	2	3
(Czech Republic) P Kvitová	6	6
WC	(United States) C McNally	3	6	6^{7}
5	(Tunisia) O Jabeur	6	4	7^{9}

Third round
Q	(Australia) A Tomljanović	3	7^{7}	6
V Kudermetova	6	6^{4}	3
(Czech Republic) P Kvitová	6	4	6
5	(Tunisia) O Jabeur	1	6	0

Quarterfinals
Q	(Australia) A Tomljanović	2	3
(Czech Republic) P Kvitová	6	6

=== Bottom half ===
==== Section 3 ====
First round
Q	(Ukraine) M Kostyuk	6	5	6
(Italy) C Giorgi	4	7	4
(Estonia) K Kanepi	3	6	3
V Azarenka	6	4	6
PR	(United States) S Williams	4	0
10	(United Kingdom) E Raducanu	6	6
14	(Czech Republic) Ka Plíšková	7	6
WC	(United States) V Williams	5	1
Q	(Ukraine) A Kalinina	1	1
(Belgium) E Mertens	6	6
Q	(France) C Garcia	6	6
LL	(Croatia) P Martić	3	3

Second round
7	(United States) J Pegula	6^{5}	6	6
Q	(Ukraine) M Kostyuk	7^{7}	1	2
V Azarenka	0	2
10	(United Kingdom) E Raducanu	6	6
14	(Czech Republic) Ka Plíšková	6^{3}	3
(Belgium) E Mertens	7^{7}	6
Q	(France) C Garcia	7^{7}	6^{6}	6
4	(Greece) M Sakkari	6^{2}	7^{8}	1

Third round
7	(United States) J Pegula	7	6
10	(United Kingdom) E Raducanu	5	4
(Belgium) E Mertens	4	5
Q	(France) C Garcia	6	7

Quarterfinals
7	(United States) J Pegula	1	5
Q	(France) C Garcia	6	7

==== Section 4 ====
First round
(Italy) M Trevisan	6^{2}	5
Q	A Kalinskaya	7^{7}	7
WC	(United States) S Kenin	2	1
WC	(United States) S Rogers	6	6
(United States) A Anisimova	6	6
9	D Kasatkina	4	4
13	(Canada) L Fernandez	4	5
E Alexandrova	6	7
(Japan) N Osaka	4	5
(China) S Zhang	6	7
Q	(Czech Republic) T Martincová	6^{4}	6	6
LL	(Spain) N Párrizas Díaz	7^{7}	4	3

Second round
6	A Sabalenka	6	4
Q	A Kalinskaya	3	1^{r}
WC	(United States) S Rogers	w/o
(United States) A Anisimova
E Alexandrova	3	4
(China) S Zhang	6	6
Q	(Czech Republic) T Martincová	6	5	4
2	(Estonia) A Kontaveit	3	7	6

Third round
6	A Sabalenka	6	6^{2}	6
WC	(United States) S Rogers	4	7^{7}	4
(China) S Zhang	2	6	6
2	(Estonia) A Kontaveit	6	4	4

Quarterfinals
6	A Sabalenka	6	7^{7}
(China) S Zhang	4	6^{1}

== Seeded players ==
The following are the seeded players. Seedings are based on WTA rankings as of August 8, 2022. Rank and points before are as of August 15, 2022.

The event is not mandatory on the women's side and points from the 2021 tournament are included in the table below only if they counted towards the player's ranking as of August 15, 2022. For other players, the points defending column shows the lower of (a) points from her second-highest non-mandatory WTA 1000 tournament (which are required to be counted in her ranking) or (b) her 16th best result.

Points defending will be replaced at the end of the tournament by (a) the player's points from the 2022 tournament, (b) her 17th best result, or (c) points from her second-highest non-mandatory WTA 1000 event.

Seed	Rank	Player	Points before	Points defending (or 16th best result)	Points won (or 17th best result)	Points after	Status
1	1	(Poland) Iga Świątek	8,501	1	105	8,605	Third round lost to (United States) Madison Keys
2	2	(Estonia) Anett Kontaveit	4,476	1	105	4,580	Third round lost to (China) Zhang Shuai
3	4	(Spain) Paula Badosa	4,155	190	(15)^{†}	3,980	Second round lost to (Australia) Ajla Tomljanović [Q]
4	3	(Greece) Maria Sakkari	4,190	(55)^{†}	(55)^{†}	4,190	Second round lost to (France) Caroline Garcia [Q]
5	5	(Tunisia) Ons Jabeur	3,920	105	105	3,920	Third round lost to (Czech Republic) Petra Kvitová
6	7	Aryna Sabalenka	3,121	1	350	3,470	Semifinals lost to (France) Caroline Garcia [Q]
7	8	(United States) Jessica Pegula	3,116	105	190	3,201	Quarterfinals lost to (France) Caroline Garcia [Q]
8	9	(Spain) Garbiñe Muguruza	2,990	105	1	2,886	Second round lost to (Kazakhstan) Elena Rybakina
9	10	Daria Kasatkina	2,795	(55)^{†}	(55)^{†}	2,795	First round lost to (United States) Amanda Anisimova
10	13	(United Kingdom) Emma Raducanu	2,742	1^{‡}+95^{§}	105+5^{†}	2,756	Third round lost to (United States) Jessica Pegula [7]
11	12	(United States) Coco Gauff	2,746	60	1	2,687	First round retired against (Czech Republic) Marie Bouzková [Q]
12	11	(Switzerland) Belinda Bencic	2,765	190	(60)^{‡}	2,635	First round lost to (Romania) Sorana Cîrstea
13	14	(Canada) Leylah Fernandez	2,569	30	1	2,540	First round lost to Ekaterina Alexandrova
14	17	(Czech Republic) Karolína Plíšková	2,297	350	60	2,007	Second round lost to (Belgium) Elise Mertens
15	6	(Romania) Simona Halep	3,255	(60)^{‡}	60	3,255	Second round withdrew
16	15	(Latvia) Jeļena Ostapenko	2,361	105	60	2,316	Second round lost to (United States) Madison Keys

† Points from the player's 16th best result (for points defending) or 17th best result (for points won), in each case as of August 15, 2022.
‡ Points from the player's second-best non-mandatory WTA 1000 event, which are required to be counted in her ranking.
§ The player is defending points from a WTA 125 tournament (Chicago).

== Other entry information ==
=== Wild cards ===
- (United States) Sofia Kenin
- (United States) Caty McNally
- (United States) Shelby Rogers
- (United States) Sloane Stephens
- (United States) Venus Williams

=== Protected ranking ===
- ~~(Canada) Bianca Andreescu~~
- ~~(Czech Republic) Karolína Muchová~~
- (United States) Serena Williams

=== Withdrawals ===
Before the tournament

- (Canada) Bianca Andreescu → replaced by (Spain) Nuria Párrizas Díaz
- (United States) Danielle Collins → replaced by (Croatia) Petra Martić
- (Germany) Angelique Kerber → replaced by (Spain) Sara Sorribes Tormo
- (Czech Republic) Karolína Muchová → replaced by Anastasia Potapova

During the tournament

- (United States) Amanda Anisimova (right foot injury)
- (Czech Republic) Marie Bouzková (right trunk injury)
- (Romania) Simona Halep (right thigh injury)

=== Retirements ===
- (United States) Coco Gauff (left ankle injury)
- Anna Kalinskaya (dizziness)

== Qualifying ==
=== Seeds ===
1. (Romania) Irina-Camelia Begu (first round)
2. (France) Caroline Garcia (qualified)
3. (Czech Republic) Marie Bouzková (qualified)
4. Anastasia Potapova (qualifying competition, lucky loser)
5. (Denmark) Clara Tauson (first round)
6. (Ukraine) Anhelina Kalinina (qualified)
7. (Hungary) Anna Bondár (first round)
8. (Italy) Jasmine Paolini (first round)
9. (Spain) Nuria Párrizas Díaz (qualifying competition, lucky loser)
10. (Croatia) Petra Martić (qualifying competition, lucky loser)
11. Varvara Gracheva (first round)
12. (Czech Republic) Kateřina Siniaková (first round)
13. (Slovenia) Kaja Juvan (first round)
14. (Colombia) Camila Osorio (first round)
15. Anna Kalinskaya (qualified)
16. (Poland) Magda Linette (qualifying competition)

=== Qualifiers ===
1. (Czech Republic) Tereza Martincová
2. (France) Caroline Garcia
3. (Czech Republic) Marie Bouzková
4. Anna Kalinskaya
5. (Australia) Ajla Tomljanović
6. (Ukraine) Anhelina Kalinina
7. (United States) Taylor Townsend
8. (Ukraine) Marta Kostyuk

=== Lucky losers ===
1. (Spain) Nuria Párrizas Díaz
2. (Croatia) Petra Martić
3. Anastasia Potapova

=== Qualifying draw ===
==== First qualifier ====
First round
1	(Romania) Irina-Camelia Begu	1	7	6^{4}
(Czech Republic) Tereza Martincová	6	5	7^{7}
WC	(United States) Hailey Baptiste	3	0
16	(Poland) Magda Linette	6	6

Qualifying competition
(Czech Republic) Tereza Martincová	7^{7}	6
16	(Poland) Magda Linette	6^{4}	3

==== Second qualifier ====
First round
2	(France) Caroline Garcia	4	6	6
(France) Diane Parry	6	3	2
(Germany) Andrea Petkovic	6	4	6
12	(Czech Republic) Kateřina Siniaková	4	6	1

Qualifying competition
2	(France) Caroline Garcia	6	6^{5}	6
(Germany) Andrea Petkovic	2	7^{7}	2

==== Third qualifier ====
First round
3	(Czech Republic) Marie Bouzková	6	6
(Serbia) Aleksandra Krunić	1	2
(Croatia) Donna Vekić	7^{8}	6
14	(Colombia) Camila Osorio	6^{6}	3

Qualifying competition
3	(Czech Republic) Marie Bouzková	6	6
(Croatia) Donna Vekić	1	4

==== Fourth qualifier ====
First round
4	Anastasia Potapova	6	6
(United Kingdom) Harriet Dart	2	4
WC	(Germany) Tatjana Maria	0	1
15	Anna Kalinskaya	6	6

Qualifying competition
4	Anastasia Potapova	5	1
15	Anna Kalinskaya	7	6

==== Fifth qualifier ====
First round
5	(Denmark) Clara Tauson	2	3
(Australia) Ajla Tomljanović	6	6
(Montenegro) Danka Kovinić	0	2
9	(Spain) Nuria Párrizas Díaz	6	6

Qualifying competition
(Australia) Ajla Tomljanović	4	6	6
9	(Spain) Nuria Párrizas Díaz	6	1	1

==== Sixth qualifier ====
First round
6	(Ukraine) Anhelina Kalinina	6	6
WC	(United States) Lauren Davis	2	4
(Ukraine) Dayana Yastremska	2	2
10	(Croatia) Petra Martić	6	6

Qualifying competition
6	(Ukraine) Anhelina Kalinina	6^{3}	6	6
10	(Croatia) Petra Martić	7^{7}	4	1

==== Seventh qualifier ====
First round
7	(Hungary) Anna Bondár	6^{2}	4
PR	(United States) Taylor Townsend	7^{7}	6
WC	(United States) Peyton Stearns	6	6
11	Varvara Gracheva	2	2

Qualifying competition
PR	(United States) Taylor Townsend	3	6	6
WC	(United States) Peyton Stearns	6	3	3

==== Eighth qualifier ====
First round
8	(Italy) Jasmine Paolini	2	2
(Ukraine) Marta Kostyuk	6	6
(Poland) Magdalena Fręch	6	4	6
13	(Slovenia) Kaja Juvan	1	6	2

Qualifying competition
(Ukraine) Marta Kostyuk	6	3	6
(Poland) Magdalena Fręch	1	6	4
