= 2023 Chicago Challenger =

- Date: August 21–26
- Edition: 3rd
- Category: WTA 125
- Draw: 32S / 8D
- Prize money: $115,000
- Surface: Hard, outdoor
- Location: Chicago, United States
- Venue: XS Tennis Village

Champions

Singles
- (Bulgaria) Viktoriya Tomova

Doubles
- (Norway) Ulrikke Eikeri / (Estonia) Ingrid Neel
← 2021 ·	Chicago Challenger	· 2024 →

The 2023 Chicago Challenger was a professional tennis tournament played on outdoor hard courts. It was part of the 2023 WTA Challenger Tour. It was the third edition of the tournament which took place from August 21 to 26, 2023 at the XS Tennis Village in Chicago, United States.

== Singles main draw entrants ==
=== Seeds ===
Country	Player	Rank^{1}	Seed
NED	Arantxa Rus	41	1
	Elina Avanesyan	64	2
COL	Camila Osorio	65	3
FRA	Alizé Cornet	66	4
ITA	Lucia Bronzetti	68	5
ESP	Rebeka Masarova	73	6
FRA	Diane Parry	75	7
	Kamilla Rakhimova	80	8

- ^{1} Rankings are as of 14 August 2023.

=== Other entrants ===
The following players received wildcards into the singles main draw:

- (United States) Kolie Allen
- (United States) Varvara Lepchenko
- (United States) Clervie Ngounoue
- (United States) Whitney Osuigwe

The following players received entry using protected rankings:

- Margarita Betova

The following players received entry from the qualifying draw:

- (Norway) Ulrikke Eikeri
- (United States) Quinn Gleason
- (Australia) Storm Hunter
- Irina Khromacheva

The following player received entry as a lucky loser:

- (United States) Adesuwa Osabuohien

=== Withdrawals ===
Before the tournament

- (Belgium) Maryna Zanevska → replaced by (United States) Adesuwa Osabuohien

== Doubles main draw entrants ==
=== Seeds ===
Country	Player	Country	Player	Rank^{1}	Seed
NOR	Ulrikke Eikeri	EST	Ingrid Neel	107	1
	Yana Sizikova	BEL	Kimberley Zimmermann	109	2

- Rankings are as of 14 August 2023

=== Other entrants ===
The following pair received a wildcard into the doubles main draw:

- (United States) Kolie Allen / (United States) Ashley Matz

== Champions ==
=== Singles ===
- (Bulgaria) Viktoriya Tomova def. (United States) Claire Liu 6–1, 6–4

=== Doubles ===
- (Norway) Ulrikke Eikeri / (Estonia) Ingrid Neel def. (Spain) Cristina Bucșa / Alexandra Panova, walkover
