= 2023 Chicago Challenger – Singles =

Singles
- 2023 Chicago Challenger

Final
- Champion: (Bulgaria) Viktoriya Tomova
- Runner-up: (United States) Claire Liu
- Score: 6–1, 6–4

Details
- Draw: 32
- Seeds: 8

Events
Singles	Doubles
← 2021 ·	Chicago Challenger	· 2024 →

Viktoriya Tomova won the title, defeating Claire Liu in the final, 6–1, 6–4.

Clara Tauson was the defending champion from 2021, when the event was last held, but chose to compete in Cleveland instead.

== Seeds ==
1. (Netherlands) Arantxa Rus (first round)
2. Elina Avanesyan (first round)
3. (Colombia) Camila Osorio (first round)
4. (France) Alizé Cornet (second round)
5. (Italy) Lucia Bronzetti (semifinals)
6. (Spain) Rebeka Masarova (quarterfinals)
7. (France) Diane Parry (first round)
8. Kamilla Rakhimova (quarterfinals)

== Draw ==
=== Key ===
- Q = Qualifier
- WC = Wild card
- LL = Lucky loser
- Alt = Alternate
- SE = Special exempt
- PR = Protected ranking
- ITF = ITF entry
- JE = Junior exempt
- w/o = Walkover
- r = Retired
- d = Defaulted
- SR = Special ranking

=== Finals ===
Semifinals
5	(Italy) Lucia Bronzetti	6^{3}	6	1
(Bulgaria) Viktoriya Tomova	7^{7}	3	6
(United States) Claire Liu	2
(Spain) Cristina Bucșa	1^{r}

Final
(Bulgaria) Viktoriya Tomova	6	6
(United States) Claire Liu	1	4

=== Top half ===
First round
1	(Netherlands) A Rus	6^{5}	3
(Ukraine) K Baindl	7^{7}	6
Q	(Norway) U Eikeri	6	1	1
(United States) S Chang	3	6	6
(United Kingdom) J Burrage	7	3	6^{4}
Q	(United States) Q Gleason	5	6	7^{7}
(Canada) R Marino	6^{4}	1
5	(Italy) L Bronzetti	7^{7}	6
4	(France) A Cornet	6	7
WC	(United States) W Osuigwe	0	5
(Bulgaria) V Tomova	6	6
LL	(United States) A Osabuohien	0	0
(United States) R Anderson	7^{7}	4	4
WC	(United States) C Ngounoue	6^{4}	6	6
(Poland) K Kawa	1	2
8	K Rakhimova	6	6

Second round
(Ukraine) K Baindl	7^{7}	6
(United States) S Chang	6^{1}	2
Q	(United States) Q Gleason	6^{2}	2
5	(Italy) L Bronzetti	7^{7}	6
4	(France) A Cornet	4	6^{5}
(Bulgaria) V Tomova	6	7^{7}
WC	(United States) C Ngounoue	0	7	1
8	K Rakhimova	6	5	6

Quarterfinals
(Ukraine) K Baindl
5	(Italy) L Bronzetti	w/o
(Bulgaria) V Tomova	7	4	6
8	K Rakhimova	5	6	3

Semifinals
5	(Italy) L Bronzetti	6^{3}	6	1
(Bulgaria) V Tomova	7^{7}	3	6

=== Bottom half ===
First round
6	(Spain) R Masarova	6	6
(Hungary) P Udvardy	2	4
Q	I Khromacheva	1	0
(United States) M Brengle	6	6
(Romania) I Fetecău	1	4
(United States) C Liu	6	6
Q	(Australia) S Hunter	6	6
3	(Colombia) C Osorio	2	4
7	(France) D Parry	1	4
(Sweden) R Peterson	6	6
(Estonia) K Kanepi	6	6
PR	M Betova	2	1
WC	(United States) K Allen	0	2
(Spain) C Bucșa	6	6
WC	(United States) V Lepchenko	6	6
2	E Avanesyan	2	4

Second round
6	(Spain) R Masarova	7^{7}	6
(United States) M Brengle	6^{4}	3
(United States) C Liu	6	6
Q	(Australia) S Hunter	0	4
(Sweden) R Peterson	6	1	6
(Estonia) K Kanepi	4	6	3
(Spain) C Bucșa	w/o
WC	(United States) V Lepchenko

Quarterfinals
6	(Spain) R Masarova	5	7	6^{3}
(United States) C Liu	7	5	7^{7}
(Sweden) R Peterson	6	4	4
(Spain) C Bucșa	3	6	6

Semifinals
(United States) C Liu	2
(Spain) C Bucșa	1^{r}

== Qualifying ==
=== Seeds ===
1. (Australia) Storm Hunter (qualified)
2. Irina Khromacheva (qualified)
3. (Japan) Eri Hozumi (qualifying competition)
4. (Norway) Ulrikke Eikeri (qualified)

=== Qualifiers ===
1. (Australia) Storm Hunter
2. Irina Khromacheva
3. (United States) Quinn Gleason
4. (Norway) Ulrikke Eikeri

=== Lucky loser ===
1. (United States) Adesuwa Osabuohien

=== Qualifying draw ===
==== First qualifier ====
Qualifying competition
1	(Australia) Storm Hunter	6	6
WC	(United States) Adesuwa Osabuohien	0	2

==== Second qualifier ====
Qualifying competition
2	Irina Khromacheva	6	6
WC	(United States) Ashley Matz	2	2

==== Third qualifier ====
Qualifying competition
3	(Japan) Eri Hozumi	2	2
	(United States) Quinn Gleason	6	6

==== Fourth qualifier ====
Qualifying competition
4	(Norway) Ulrikke Eikeri	6	6
WC	(United States) Nia Cooper	1	0
