= 2023 Chicago Challenger – Doubles =

Doubles
- 2023 Chicago Challenger

Final
- Champions: (Norway) Ulrikke Eikeri (Estonia) Ingrid Neel
- Runners-up: (Spain) Cristina Bucșa; Alexandra Panova
- Score: Walkover

Events
Singles	Doubles
← 2021 ·	Chicago Challenger	· 2024 →

Ulrikke Eikeri and Ingrid Neel won the title by walkover after Cristina Bucșa and Alexandra Panova withdrew from the final.

Eri Hozumi and Peangtarn Plipuech were the reigning champions from 2021, when the event was last held, but Plipuech chose not to participate. Hozumi partnered Sophie Chang, but lost in the quarterfinals to Yana Sizikova and Kimberley Zimmermann.

== Seeds ==
1. (Norway) Ulrikke Eikeri / (Estonia) Ingrid Neel (champions)
2. Yana Sizikova / (Belgium) Kimberley Zimmermann (semifinals)

== Draw ==
=== Key ===
- Q = Qualifier
- WC = Wild card
- LL = Lucky loser
- Alt = Alternate
- SE = Special exempt
- PR = Protected ranking
- ITF = ITF entry
- JE = Junior exempt
- w/o = Walkover
- r = Retired
- d = Defaulted
- SR = Special ranking

=== Draw ===
Quarterfinals
1	(Norway) U Eikeri (Estonia) I Neel	7	6
I Khromacheva (Hungary) P Udvardy	5	3
(France) D Parry (Netherlands) A Rus	6	7^{7}
E Avanesyan; K Rakhimova	2	6^{2}
(Spain) C Bucșa; A Panova	6	6
WC	(United States) K Allen (United States) A Matz	2	2
(United States) S Chang (Japan) E Hozumi	3	2
2	Y Sizikova (Belgium) K Zimmermann	6	6

Semifinals
1	(Norway) U Eikeri (Estonia) I Neel	6	4	[10]
(France) D Parry (Netherlands) A Rus	3	6	[8]
(Spain) C Bucșa; A Panova	6	6
2	Y Sizikova (Belgium) K Zimmermann	2	4

Final
1	(Norway) U Eikeri (Estonia) I Neel	w/o
(Spain) C Bucșa; A Panova
