= 2021 Western & Southern Open – Women's singles =

Women's Tennis Tour

Women's singles
- 2021 Western & Southern Open

Final
- Champion: (Australia) Ashleigh Barty
- Runner-up: (Switzerland) Jil Teichmann
- Score: 6–3, 6–1

Details
- Draw: 56 (8 Q / 5 WC )
- Seeds: 16

Events
Singles	men	women
Doubles	men	women
← 2020 ·	Western & Southern Open	· 2022 →

Ashleigh Barty defeated Jil Teichmann in the final, 6–3, 6–1 to win the women's singles tennis title at the 2021 Cincinnati Masters. Barty did not drop a set en route to her first Cincinnati Masters title. It was her fifth and last title of the season, her third WTA 1000 title, and her 13th career WTA Tour singles title.

Victoria Azarenka was the defending champion, but lost in the third round to Barty.

Angelique Kerber contested her 1000th match in her professional career in the quarterfinals against Petra Kvitová; she won the match after Kvitová retired.

This was the final tournament in which former world No. 4 and British No. 1 Johanna Konta competed before her retirement. She was defeated in the first round by Karolína Muchová.

== Seeds ==
The top eight seeds received a bye into the second round.

1. (Australia) Ashleigh Barty (champion)
2. (Japan) Naomi Osaka (third round)
3. (Belarus) Aryna Sabalenka (second round)
4. (Ukraine) Elina Svitolina (second round)
5. (Czech Republic) Karolína Plíšková (semifinals)
6. (Poland) Iga Świątek (second round)
7. (Canada) Bianca Andreescu (second round)
8. (Spain) Garbiñe Muguruza (third round)

9. (Czech Republic) Barbora Krejčíková (quarterfinals)
10. (Switzerland) Belinda Bencic (quarterfinals)
11. (Czech Republic) Petra Kvitová (quarterfinals, retired)
12. (Romania) Simona Halep (second round, withdrew)
13. (United States) Jennifer Brady (second round, retired)
14. (Belarus) Victoria Azarenka (third round)
15. (Belgium) Elise Mertens (second round)
16. (Russia) Anastasia Pavlyuchenkova (withdrew)

Click on the seed number of a player to go to their draw section.

== Draw ==
=== Key ===
- Q = Qualifier
- WC = Wild card
- LL = Lucky loser
- Alt = Alternate
- ITF = ITF entry
- PR = Protected ranking
- SR = Special ranking
- SE = Special exempt
- JE = Junior exempt
- JR = Junior Accelerator Programme entrant
- CO = College Accelerator Programme entrant
- NG = Next Gen Accelerator Program entrant
- w/o = Walkover
- r = Retired
- d = Defaulted

=== Finals ===
Quarterfinals
1	(Australia) Ashleigh Barty	6	6
9	(Czech Republic) Barbora Krejčíková	2	4
(Germany) Angelique Kerber	6	3
11	(Czech Republic) Petra Kvitová	4	3^{r}
5	(Czech Republic) Karolína Plíšková	7	2
(Spain) Paula Badosa	5	0^{r}
10	(Switzerland) Belinda Bencic	3	2
WC	(Switzerland) Jil Teichmann	6	6

Semifinals
1	(Australia) Ashleigh Barty	6	7
(Germany) Angelique Kerber	2	5
5	(Czech Republic) Karolína Plíšková	2	4
WC	(Switzerland) Jil Teichmann	6	6

Final
1	(Australia) Ashleigh Barty	6	6
WC	(Switzerland) Jil Teichmann	3	1

=== Top half ===
==== Section 1 ====
First round
Q	(Belarus) A Sasnovich	2	6	1
Q	(United Kingdom) H Watson	6	3	6
(United States) A Riske	6	6
Q	(Canada) L Fernandez	2	2
Q	(Russia) L Samsonova	2	3
14	(Belarus) V Azarenka	6	6
9	(Czech Republic) B Krejčíková	6	6
(Russia) D Kasatkina	3	2
WC	(United States) C McNally	6^{3}	6^{1}
(Ukraine) D Yastremska	7^{7}	7^{7}
Q	(France) C Garcia	7^{9}	4	6
WC	(United States) S Stephens	6^{7}	6	4

Second round
1	(Australia) A Barty	6	7^{7}
Q	(United Kingdom) H Watson	4	6^{3}
(United States) A Riske	2	5
14	(Belarus) V Azarenka	6	7
9	(Czech Republic) B Krejčíková	6	7^{7}
(Ukraine) D Yastremska	1	6^{5}
Q	(France) C Garcia	4	3
8	(Spain) G Muguruza	6	6

Third round
1	(Australia) A Barty	6	6
14	(Belarus) V Azarenka	0	2
9	(Czech Republic) B Krejčíková	6	6^{5}	6
8	(Spain) G Muguruza	1	7^{7}	2

Quarterfinals
1	(Australia) A Barty	6	6
9	(Czech Republic) B Krejčíková	2	4

==== Section 2 ====
First round
(Greece) M Sakkari	2	2
(Germany) A Kerber	6	6
(Latvia) J Ostapenko	7	6
(Slovenia) T Zidanšek	5	1
(Russia) E Alexandrova	3	6^{3}
13	(United States) J Brady	6	7^{7}
11	(Czech Republic) P Kvitová	7	6
(United States) M Keys	5	4
(Russia) V Kudermetova	6	6
Q	(Italy) J Paolini	3	2
(Tunisia) O Jabeur	6	4	7
(Estonia) A Kontaveit	2	6	5

Second round
4	(Ukraine) E Svitolina	5	6	4
(Germany) A Kerber	7	2	6
(Latvia) J Ostapenko	6^{2}	5
13	(United States) J Brady	7^{7}	4^{r}
11	(Czech Republic) P Kvitová	6	6
(Russia) V Kudermetova	2	4
(Tunisia) O Jabeur	6	6
6	(Poland) I Świątek	3	3

Third round
(Germany) A Kerber	4	6	7
(Latvia) J Ostapenko	6	2	5
11	(Czech Republic) P Kvitová	6	6
(Tunisia) O Jabeur	1	2

Quarterfinals
(Germany) A Kerber	6	3
11	(Czech Republic) P Kvitová	4	3^{r}

=== Bottom half ===
==== Section 3 ====
First round
(Kazakhstan) Y Putintseva	6	6
Q	(China) S Zhang	2	0
(United States) J Pegula	6	6
SE	(Italy) C Giorgi	2	2
(Poland) M Linette	4	6	1
12	(Romania) S Halep	6	3	6
15	(Belgium) E Mertens	6	6
(Argentina) N Podoroska	3	4
WC	(Australia) S Stosur	3	3
(Kazakhstan) E Rybakina	6	6
(Spain) P Badosa	4	6	7^{11}
(Croatia) P Martić	6	4	6^{9}

Second round
5	(Czech Republic) Ka Plíšková	6	6
(Kazakhstan) Y Putintseva	3	2
(United States) J Pegula	w/o
12	(Romania) S Halep
15	(Belgium) E Mertens	3	2
(Kazakhstan) E Rybakina	6	6
(Spain) P Badosa	5	6	7^{7}
3	(Belarus) A Sabalenka	7	2	6^{4}

Third round
5	(Czech Republic) Ka Plíšková	6	7^{7}
(United States) J Pegula	4	6^{5}
(Kazakhstan) E Rybakina	2	6^{5}
(Spain) P Badosa	6	7^{7}

Quarterfinals
5	(Czech Republic) Ka Plíšková	7	2
(Spain) P Badosa	5	0^{r}

==== Section 4 ====
First round
(Czech Republic) K Muchová	3	7^{7}	6
(United Kingdom) J Konta	6	6^{5}	2
(United States) D Collins	4	1^{r}
(United States) S Rogers	6	2
(Czech Republic) M Vondroušová	3	5
10	(Switzerland) B Bencic	6	7
LL	(Sweden) R Peterson	4	1
WC	(United States) B Pera	6	6
WC	(Switzerland) J Teichmann	6	6
(Romania) S Cîrstea	2	0
Q	(Chinese Taipei) S-w Hsieh	1	2
(United States) C Gauff	6	6

Second round
7	(Canada) B Andreescu	4	2
(Czech Republic) K Muchová	6	6
(United States) S Rogers	6^{1}	1
10	(Switzerland) B Bencic	7^{7}	6
WC	(United States) B Pera	1	4
WC	(Switzerland) J Teichmann	6	6
(United States) C Gauff	6	3	4
2	(Japan) N Osaka	4	6	6

Third round
(Czech Republic) K Muchová	5	1^{r}
10	(Switzerland) B Bencic	7	2
WC	(Switzerland) J Teichmann	3	6	6
2	(Japan) N Osaka	6	3	3

Quarterfinals
10	(Switzerland) B Bencic	3	2
WC	(Switzerland) J Teichmann	6	6

== Qualifying ==
=== Seeds ===
1. (Switzerland) Viktorija Golubic (first round)
2. (China) Zhang Shuai (qualified)
3. (Russia) Liudmila Samsonova (qualified)
4. (Sweden) Rebecca Peterson (qualifying competition, lucky loser)
5. (Czech Republic) Kateřina Siniaková (withdrew)
6. (Croatia) Donna Vekić (qualifying competition)
7. (France) Kristina Mladenovic (first round)
8. (Czech Republic) Tereza Martincová (first round)
9. (France) Caroline Garcia (qualified)
10. (Latvia) Anastasija Sevastova (first round, retired)
11. (United Kingdom) Heather Watson (qualified)
12. (Germany) Andrea Petkovic (qualifying competition)
13. (Canada) Leylah Annie Fernandez (qualified)
14. (Chinese Taipei) Hsieh Su-wei (qualified)
15. (Czech Republic) Marie Bouzková (qualifying competition)
16. (Colombia) Camila Osorio (first round)

=== Qualifiers ===
1. (France) Caroline Garcia
2. (China) Zhang Shuai
3. (Russia) Liudmila Samsonova
4. (United Kingdom) Heather Watson
5. (Chinese Taipei) Hsieh Su-wei
6. (Italy) Jasmine Paolini
7. (Belarus) Aliaksandra Sasnovich
8. (Canada) Leylah Annie Fernandez

=== Lucky loser ===
1. (Sweden) Rebecca Peterson

=== Draw ===
==== First qualifier ====
First round
1	(Switzerland) Viktorija Golubic	2	6	0
(France) Fiona Ferro	6	2	6
WC	(United States) Alycia Parks	3	6	3
9	(France) Caroline Garcia	6	1	6

Qualifying competition
(France) Fiona Ferro	6	3	0
9	(France) Caroline Garcia	3	6	6

==== Second qualifier ====
First round
2	(China) Zhang Shuai	6	6
PR	(Kazakhstan) Yaroslava Shvedova	2	4
(Slovenia) Polona Hercog	6	2	3
15	(Czech Republic) Marie Bouzková	4	6	6

Qualifying competition
2	(China) Zhang Shuai	7	4	6
15	(Czech Republic) Marie Bouzková	5	6	0

==== Third qualifier ====
First round
3	(Russia) Liudmila Samsonova	6	7
(Russia) Vera Zvonareva	2	5
(Russia) Anna Blinkova	6	6
16	(Colombia) Camila Osorio	3	0

Qualifying competition
3	(Russia) Liudmila Samsonova	7	7^{7}
(Russia) Anna Blinkova	5	6^{1}

==== Fourth qualifier ====
First round
4	(Sweden) Rebecca Peterson	7	6
(Australia) Astra Sharma	5	3
WC	(United States) Katie Volynets	7	2	2
11	(United Kingdom) Heather Watson	5	6	6

Qualifying competition
4	(Sweden) Rebecca Peterson	4	6	3
11	(United Kingdom) Heather Watson	6	4	6

==== Fifth qualifier ====
First round
Alt	(United States) Kristie Ahn	6	2	2
(United States) Lauren Davis	4	6	6
WC	(United States) Peyton Stearns	6^{3}	4
14	(Chinese Taipei) Hsieh Su-wei	7^{7}	6

Qualifying competition
(United States) Lauren Davis	0	4
14	(Chinese Taipei) Hsieh Su-wei	6	6

==== Sixth qualifier ====
First round
6	(Croatia) Donna Vekić	6	6
(United States) Christina McHale	4	1
(Italy) Jasmine Paolini	6	2
10	(Latvia) Anastasija Sevastova	1	1^{r}

Qualifying competition
6	(Croatia) Donna Vekić	6^{2}	2
(Italy) Jasmine Paolini	7^{7}	6

==== Seventh qualifier ====
First round
7	(France) Kristina Mladenovic	4	5
(Belarus) Aliaksandra Sasnovich	6	7
WC	(United States) Emma Navarro	6^{3}	4
12	(Germany) Andrea Petkovic	7^{7}	6

Qualifying competition
(Belarus) Aliaksandra Sasnovich	7	6
12	(Germany) Andrea Petkovic	5	2

==== Eighth qualifier ====
First round
8	(Czech Republic) Tereza Martincová	3	5
(Romania) Elena-Gabriela Ruse	6	7
(Romania) Irina-Camelia Begu	3	3
13	(Canada) Leylah Annie Fernandez	6	6

Qualifying competition
(Romania) Elena-Gabriela Ruse	2	0
13	(Canada) Leylah Annie Fernandez	6	6
