= 2018 Oracle Challenger Series – Chicago – Women's singles =

Chicago – Women's singles
- 2018 Oracle Challenger Series – Chicago

Final
- Champion: (Croatia) Petra Martić
- Runner-up: (Germany) Mona Barthel
- Score: 6–4, 6–1

Events
Singles	men	women
Doubles	men	women
Oracle Challenger Series – Chicago	· 2019 →

This was the first edition of the tournament.

Petra Martić won the title, defeating Mona Barthel in the final, 6–4, 6–1.

== Seeds ==
1. (United States) Danielle Collins (second round)
2. (Croatia) Petra Martić (champion)
3. (Kazakhstan) Zarina Diyas (second round)
4. (Germany) Tatjana Maria (semifinals)
5. (France) Pauline Parmentier (first round)
6. (United States) Sachia Vickery (semifinals, withdrew)
7. (Russia) Evgeniya Rodina (first round)
8. (Sweden) Johanna Larsson (second round)

== Draw ==
=== Key ===
- Q = Qualifier
- WC = Wild card
- LL = Lucky loser
- Alt = Alternate
- SE = Special exempt
- PR = Protected ranking
- ITF = ITF entry
- JE = Junior exempt
- w/o = Walkover
- r = Retired
- d = Defaulted
- SR = Special ranking

=== Finals ===
Semifinals
6	(United States) Sachia Vickery
(Germany) Mona Barthel	w/o
4	(Germany) Tatjana Maria	1	2
2	(Croatia) Petra Martić	6	6

Final
(Germany) Mona Barthel	4	1
2	(Croatia) Petra Martić	6	6

=== Top half ===
First round
1/WC	(United States) D Collins	6	6
(Croatia) J Fett	2	0
(Russia) A Blinkova	6	6
WC	(United States) F Di Lorenzo	4	3
(Czech Republic) Kr Plíšková	7^{7}	2	2
WC	(United States) A Kiick	6^{3}	6	6
(Tunisia) O Jabeur	4	6	4
6	(United States) S Vickery	6	4	6
3	(Kazakhstan) Z Diyas	3	6	6
(Ukraine) K Kozlova	6	2	1
(China) L Zhu	7	2	4
(Germany) M Barthel	5	6	6
(Canada) E Bouchard	6^{3}	4
Q	(United States) K Ahn	7^{7}	6
(Ukraine) D Yastremska	6	7^{7}
5	(France) P Parmentier	2	6^{2}

Second round
1/WC	(United States) D Collins	6^{6}	2
(Russia) A Blinkova	7^{8}	6
WC	(United States) A Kiick	4	0
6	(United States) S Vickery	6	6
3	(Kazakhstan) Z Diyas	2	6	3
(Germany) M Barthel	6	3	6
Q	(United States) K Ahn	6^{3}	4
(Ukraine) D Yastremska	7^{7}	6

Quarterfinals
(Russia) A Blinkova	4	5
6	(United States) S Vickery	6	7
(Germany) M Barthel	6	7^{7}
(Ukraine) D Yastremska	2	6^{5}

Semifinals
6	(United States) S Vickery
(Germany) M Barthel	w/o

=== Bottom half ===
First round
8	(Sweden) J Larsson	6	1	7^{7}
(Brazil) B Haddad Maia	4	6	6^{3}
Q	(Canada) F Abanda	6	6
Q	(United States) R Anderson	3	1
(United States) M Brengle	6	6
WC	(United States) L Davis	0	0
Q	(United States) I Falconi	5	3
4	(Germany) T Maria	7	6
7	(Russia) E Rodina	2	3
(Spain) S Sorribes Tormo	6	6
(United Kingdom) K Boulter	6	2	0^{r}
WC	(United States) V Lepchenko	4	6	0
(Russia) V Kudermetova	6	0	3
Q	(Bulgaria) S Karatantcheva	3	6	6
Q	(United States) J Loeb	1	3
2	(Croatia) P Martić	6	6

Second round
8	(Sweden) J Larsson	6	3	3
Q	(Canada) F Abanda	2	6	6
(United States) M Brengle	3	2
4	(Germany) T Maria	6	6
(Spain) S Sorribes Tormo	4	7^{7}	4
WC	(United States) V Lepchenko	6	6^{2}	6
Q	(Bulgaria) S Karatantcheva	4	2
2	(Croatia) P Martić	6	6

Quarterfinals
Q	(Canada) F Abanda	6^{7}	2
4	(Germany) T Maria	7^{9}	6
WC	(United States) V Lepchenko	5	6^{3}
2	(Croatia) P Martić	7	7^{7}

Semifinals
4	(Germany) T Maria	1	2
2	(Croatia) P Martić	6	6

== Qualifying ==
=== Seeds ===
1. (United States) Kristie Ahn (qualified)
2. (United States) Irina Falconi (qualified)
3. (United States) Jamie Loeb (qualified)
4. (Czech Republic) Marie Bouzková (first round, retired)
5. (Kazakhstan) Elena Rybakina (qualifying competition)
6. (Bulgaria) Sesil Karatantcheva (qualified)
7. (United States) Ashley Kratzer (qualifying competition)
8. (India) Karman Thandi (first round)
9. (Canada) Françoise Abanda (qualified)
10. (United States) Asia Muhammad (qualifying competition)
11. (Czech Republic) Tereza Martincová (qualifying competition)
12. (United States) Maria Sanchez (first round)

=== Qualifiers ===
1. (United States) Kristie Ahn
2. (United States) Irina Falconi
3. (United States) Jamie Loeb
4. (United States) Robin Anderson
5. (Canada) Françoise Abanda
6. (Bulgaria) Sesil Karatantcheva

=== Qualifying draw ===
==== First qualifier ====
First round
1	(United States) Kristie Ahn	6	6
WC	(United States) Michaela Gordon	0	2
(United States) Quinn Gleason	7^{9}	0	6
8	(India) Karman Thandi	6^{7}	6	1

Qualifying competition
1	(United States) Kristie Ahn	2	6	7
(United States) Quinn Gleason	6	4	5

==== Second qualifier ====
First round
2	(United States) Irina Falconi	6	6
PR	(Netherlands) Michaëlla Krajicek	1	4
(United States) Sanaz Marand	4	0
7	(United States) Ashley Kratzer	6	6

Qualifying competition
2	(United States) Irina Falconi	6	6
7	(United States) Ashley Kratzer	4	4

==== Third qualifier ====
First round
3/WC	(United States) Jamie Loeb	5	6	6
WC	(United States) Jacqueline Cako	7	3	2
PR	(Belarus) Olga Govortsova	6	3	0
10	(United States) Asia Muhammad	1	6	6

Qualifying competition
3/WC	(United States) Jamie Loeb	6	6
10	(United States) Asia Muhammad	1	2

==== Fourth qualifier ====
First round
4	(Czech Republic) Marie Bouzková	7^{7}	3	0^{r}
(United States) Kayla Day	6^{2}	6	2
(United States) Robin Anderson	5	6	6
12	(United States) Maria Sanchez	7	3	2

Qualifying competition
(United States) Kayla Day	6	3	6^{5}
(United States) Robin Anderson	2	6	7^{7}

==== Fifth qualifier ====
First round
5	(Kazakhstan) Elena Rybakina	6	6
WC	(United States) Naomi Cheong	0	2
(Montenegro) Ana Veselinović	1	3
9	(Canada) Françoise Abanda	6	6

Qualifying competition
5	(Kazakhstan) Elena Rybakina	2	6	4
9	(Canada) Françoise Abanda	6	4	6

==== Sixth qualifier ====
First round
6	(Bulgaria) Sesil Karatantcheva	6	7^{8}
(United States) Jennifer Elie	2	6^{6}
(Chile) Alexa Guarachi	4	0
11	(Czech Republic) Tereza Martincová	6	6

Qualifying competition
6	(Bulgaria) Sesil Karatantcheva	3	6	6
11	(Czech Republic) Tereza Martincová	6	4	2
