= 2021 Chicago Challenger – Singles =

Singles
- 2021 Chicago Challenger

Final
- Champion: (Denmark) Clara Tauson
- Runner-up: (United Kingdom) Emma Raducanu
- Score: 6–1, 2–6, 6–4

Details
- Draw: 32
- Seeds: 8

Events
Singles	Doubles
← 2018 ·	Chicago Challenger	· 2023 →

Petra Martić was the defending champion, but chose to compete at the 2021 Western & Southern Open instead.

Clara Tauson won the title, defeating wildcard Emma Raducanu in the final, 6–1, 2–6, 6–4.

== Seeds ==
1. (Belgium) Alison Van Uytvanck (first round)
2. (Montenegro) Danka Kovinić (first round)
3. (United States) Ann Li (semifinals)
4. (Ukraine) Anhelina Kalinina (first round)
5. (United States) Madison Brengle (first round)
6. (United States) Amanda Anisimova (second round, retired)
7. (Croatia) Ana Konjuh (first round)
8. (Russia) Varvara Gracheva (second round)

== Draw ==
=== Key ===
- Q = Qualifier
- WC = Wild card
- LL = Lucky loser
- Alt = Alternate
- SE = Special exempt
- PR = Protected ranking
- ITF = ITF entry
- JE = Junior exempt
- w/o = Walkover
- r = Retired
- d = Defaulted
- SR = Special ranking

=== Finals ===
Semifinals
WC	(United Kingdom) Emma Raducanu	7^{7}	4	6
(United States) Claire Liu	6^{3}	6	1
3	(United States) Ann Li	6^{5}	1
(Denmark) Clara Tauson	7^{7}	6

Final
WC	(United Kingdom) Emma Raducanu	1	6	4
(Denmark) Clara Tauson	6	2	6

=== Top half ===
First round
1	(Belgium) A Van Uytvanck	6^{7}	3
WC	(United Kingdom) E Raducanu	7^{9}	6
(France) C Burel	7	3
PR	(Serbia) I Jorović	5	2^{r}
(Germany) J Niemeier	6	6
(Belgium) G Minnen	2	2
(Spain) N Párrizas Díaz	6	2	4
6	(United States) A Anisimova	3	6	6
4	(Ukraine) A Kalinina	2	4
(Russia) A Kalinskaya	6	6
(United States) C Liu	6	6
(Belgium) Y Bonaventure	3	2
PR	(Ukraine) K Kozlova	5	6	7^{7}
Q	(Belgium) M Zanevska	7	4	6^{2}
Q	(Russia) V Diatchenko	7^{7}	6
7	(Croatia) A Konjuh	6^{4}	3

Second round
WC	(United Kingdom) E Raducanu	6	7
(France) C Burel	2	5
(Germany) J Niemeier	3	6	4
6	(United States) A Anisimova	6	3	0^{r}
(Russia) A Kalinskaya	4	6	3
(United States) C Liu	6	4	6
PR	(Ukraine) K Kozlova	5	6	4
Q	(Russia) V Diatchenko	7	1	6

Quarterfinals
WC	(United Kingdom) E Raducanu	7^{7}	0
(Germany) J Niemeier	6^{4}	0^{r}
(United States) C Liu	6	6
Q	(Russia) V Diatchenko	2	3

Semifinals
WC	(United Kingdom) E Raducanu	7^{7}	4	6
(United States) C Liu	6^{3}	6	1

=== Bottom half ===
First round
5	(United States) M Brengle	7^{7}	6^{5}	4
(Kazakhstan) Z Diyas	6^{2}	7^{7}	6
(France) H Tan	4	6	3
(Italy) S Errani	6	2	6
WC	(United States) C Vandeweghe	6^{3}	4
(France) O Dodin	7^{7}	6
WC	(United States) W Osuigwe	3	4
3	(United States) A Li	6	6
8	(Russia) V Gracheva	4	6	6
(Japan) M Doi	6	4	4
Q	(United States) C Dolehide	3	6	2
(Australia) S Sanders	6	4	6
Q	(United Kingdom) H Dart	1	7^{7}	2
(Denmark) C Tauson	6	6^{2}	6
WC	(United States) H Baptiste	6	6
2	(Montenegro) D Kovinić	3	4

Second round
(Kazakhstan) Z Diyas	6	1	6
(Italy) S Errani	3	6	4
(France) O Dodin	3	1
3	(United States) A Li	6	6
8	(Russia) V Gracheva	7	3	4
(Australia) S Sanders	5	6	6
(Denmark) C Tauson	6	3	6
WC	(United States) H Baptiste	2	6	3

Quarterfinals
(Kazakhstan) Z Diyas	4	6	3
3	(United States) A Li	6	2	6
(Australia) S Sanders	5	3
(Denmark) C Tauson	7	6

Semifinals
3	(United States) A Li	6^{5}	1
(Denmark) C Tauson	7^{7}	6

== Qualifying ==
=== Seeds ===
1. (Slovakia) Kristína Kučová (qualifying competition)
2. (Belgium) Maryna Zanevska (qualified)
3. (France) Harmony Tan (moved to main draw)
4. (Russia) Vitalia Diatchenko (qualified)

=== Qualifiers ===
1. (United Kingdom) Harriet Dart
2. (Belgium) Maryna Zanevska
3. (United States) Caroline Dolehide
4. (Russia) Vitalia Diatchenko

=== Draw ===
==== First qualifier ====
Qualifying competition
1	(Slovakia) Kristína Kučová	6	4	4
Alt	(United Kingdom) Harriet Dart	2	6	6

==== Second qualifier ====
Qualifying competition
2	(Belgium) Maryna Zanevska	6	6
	(Hungary) Dalma Gálfi	2	2

==== Third qualifier ====
Qualifying competition
Alt	(Netherlands) Lesley Pattinama Kerkhove	6	2	3
WC	(United States) Caroline Dolehide	2	6	6

==== Fourth qualifier ====
Qualifying competition
4	(Russia) Vitalia Diatchenko	7^{7}	6
WC	(United States) Dalayna Hewitt	6^{5}	3
