= 2018 Oracle Challenger Series – Chicago – Women's doubles =

Chicago – Women's doubles
- 2018 Oracle Challenger Series – Chicago

Final
- Champions: (Germany) Mona Barthel (Czech Republic) Kristýna Plíšková
- Runners-up: (United States) Asia Muhammad (United States) Maria Sanchez
- Score: 6–3, 6–2

Events
Singles	men	women
Doubles	men	women
Oracle Challenger Series – Chicago	· 2019 →

This was the first edition of the tournament.

Mona Barthel and Kristýna Plíšková won the title, defeating Asia Muhammad and Maria Sanchez in the final, 6–3, 6–2.

== Seeds ==
1. (United States) Kaitlyn Christian / (United States) Sabrina Santamaria (quarterfinals)
2. (Croatia) Darija Jurak / (Switzerland) Xenia Knoll (semifinals)
3. (Chile) Alexa Guarachi / (United States) Desirae Krawczyk (quarterfinals)
4. (Russia) Natela Dzalamidze / (Russia) Veronika Kudermetova (first round)

== Draw ==
=== Key ===
- Q = Qualifier
- WC = Wild card
- LL = Lucky loser
- Alt = Alternate
- SE = Special exempt
- PR = Protected ranking
- ITF = ITF entry
- JE = Junior exempt
- w/o = Walkover
- r = Retired
- d = Defaulted
- SR = Special ranking

=== Draw ===
First round
1	(United States) K Christian (United States) S Santamaria	4	6	[10]
(Russia) A Blinkova (Kazakhstan) G Voskoboeva	6	2	[4]
(United States) J Cako (Germany) N Geuer	3	3
(United States) A Muhammad (United States) M Sanchez	6	6
3	(Chile) A Guarachi (United States) D Krawczyk	7^{7}	6
(Netherlands) M Krajicek (France) P Parmentier	6^{5}	2
(United States) Q Gleason (United States) S Marand	4	1
(Russia) E Rodina (Ukraine) D Yastremska	6	6
(United States) J Loeb (United States) S Vickery	6	6
(United States) A Mueller (United Kingdom) E Webley-Smith	1	0
(Germany) M Barthel (Czech Republic) Kr Plíšková	6^{4}	6	[10]
4	(Russia) N Dzalamidze (Russia) V Kudermetova	7^{7}	2	[3]
(Brazil) B Haddad Maia (Tunisia) O Jabeur	4	3
(Kazakhstan) E Rybakina (India) K Thandi	6	6
(Indonesia) B Gumulya (Montenegro) A Veselinović	2	1
2	(Croatia) D Jurak (Switzerland) X Knoll	6	6

Quarterfinals
1	(United States) K Christian (United States) S Santamaria	6	4	[3]
(United States) A Muhammad (United States) M Sanchez	3	6	[10]
3	(Chile) A Guarachi (United States) D Krawczyk	6	3	[4]
(Russia) E Rodina (Ukraine) D Yastremska	1	6	[10]
(United States) J Loeb (United States) S Vickery	2	1
(Germany) M Barthel (Czech Republic) Kr Plíšková	6	6
(Kazakhstan) E Rybakina (India) K Thandi	0	2
2	(Croatia) D Jurak (Switzerland) X Knoll	6	6

Semifinals
(United States) A Muhammad (United States) M Sanchez	6	6
(Russia) E Rodina (Ukraine) D Yastremska	3	4
(Germany) M Barthel (Czech Republic) Kr Plíšková	7^{7}	6
2	(Croatia) D Jurak (Switzerland) X Knoll	6^{5}	4

Final
(United States) A Muhammad (United States) M Sanchez	3	2
(Germany) M Barthel (Czech Republic) Kr Plíšková	6	6
