= 2018 Oracle Challenger Series – Chicago =

- Date: September 4–9
- Edition: 1st
- Category: ATP Challenger Tour; WTA 125K series
- Draw: 32S / 16D
- Prize money: $150,000+H (ATP) $150,000 (WTA)
- Surface: Hard, outdoor
- Location: Chicago, United States
- Venue: XS Tennis Village

Champions

Men's singles
- (Uzbekistan) Denis Istomin

Women's singles
- (Croatia) Petra Martić

Men's doubles
- (United Kingdom) Luke Bambridge / (United Kingdom) Neal Skupski

Women's doubles
- (Germany) Mona Barthel / (Czech Republic) Kristýna Plíšková
- Oracle Challenger Series – Chicago

The 2018 Oracle Challenger Series – Chicago was a professional tennis tournament played on outdoor hard courts. This tournament was part of the 2018 ATP Challenger Tour and the 2018 WTA 125K series. The first edition took place from September 4 to 9, 2018 in Chicago, United States.

== Men's singles main-draw entrants ==
=== Seeds ===
Country	Player	Rank^{1}	Seed
ITA	Andreas Seppi	51	1
UZB	Denis Istomin	76	2
CAN	Vasek Pospisil	88	3
SRB	Viktor Troicki	102	4
USA	Michael Mmoh	120	5
BEL	Ruben Bemelmans	128	6
SWE	Elias Ymer	132	7
USA	Noah Rubin	135	8

- ^{1} Rankings are as of 27 August 2018.

=== Other entrants ===
The following players received wildcards into the singles main draw:

- (United States) JC Aragone
- (United States) Thai-Son Kwiatkowski
- (United States) Tommy Paul
- (Italy) Andreas Seppi

The following players received entry into the singles main draw as alternates:

- (Dominican Republic) Roberto Cid Subervi
- (United States) Ernesto Escobedo
- (Germany) Dominik Köpfer
- (United States) Donald Young

The following players received entry from the qualifying draw:

- (United States) Sekou Bangoura
- (France) Vincent Millot
- (France) Hugo Nys
- (United States) Alexander Sarkissian

The following players received entry as lucky losers:

- (South Africa) Ruan Roelofse
- (Japan) Kaichi Uchida

== Women's singles main-draw entrants ==
=== Seeds ===
Country	Player	Rank^{1}	Seed
USA	Danielle Collins	37	1
CRO	Petra Martić	47	2
KAZ	Zarina Diyas	60	3
GER	Tatjana Maria	70	4
FRA	Pauline Parmentier	71	5
USA	Sachia Vickery	78	6
RUS	Evgeniya Rodina	80	7
SWE	Johanna Larsson	82	8

- ^{1} Rankings are as of 27 August 2018.

=== Other entrants ===
The following players received wildcards into the singles main draw:

- (United States) Danielle Collins
- (United States) Lauren Davis
- (United States) Francesca Di Lorenzo
- (United States) Allie Kiick
- (United States) Varvara Lepchenko

The following players received entry from the qualifying draw:

- (Canada) Françoise Abanda
- (United States) Kristie Ahn
- (United States) Robin Anderson
- (United States) Irina Falconi
- (Bulgaria) Sesil Karatantcheva
- (United States) Jamie Loeb

=== Withdrawals ===
- (United States) Jennifer Brady → replaced by (China) Duan Yingying
- (Slovenia) Dalila Jakupović → replaced by (Brazil) Beatriz Haddad Maia
- (United States) Vania King → replaced by (China) Zhu Lin
- (Poland) Magda Linette → replaced by (United States) Madison Brengle
- (United States) Christina McHale → replaced by (Croatia) Jana Fett
- (Romania) Monica Niculescu → replaced by (United Kingdom) Katie Boulter
- (Sweden) Rebecca Peterson → replaced by (Germany) Mona Barthel
- (Puerto Rico) Monica Puig → replaced by (Tunisia) Ons Jabeur

== Women's doubles main-draw entrants ==
=== Seeds ===
Country	Player	Country	Player	Rank^{1}	Seed
USA	Kaitlyn Christian	USA	Sabrina Santamaria	108	1
CRO	Darija Jurak	SUI	Xenia Knoll	128	2
CHI	Alexa Guarachi	USA	Desirae Krawczyk	154	3
RUS	Natela Dzalamidze	RUS	Veronika Kudermetova	182	4

- Rankings are as of 27 August 2018

== Champions ==
=== Men's singles ===
- (Uzbekistan) Denis Istomin def. (United States) Reilly Opelka 6–4, 6–2.

=== Women's singles ===
- (Croatia) Petra Martić def. (Germany) Mona Barthel, 6–4, 6–1

=== Men's doubles ===
- (United Kingdom) Luke Bambridge / (United Kingdom) Neal Skupski def. (India) Leander Paes / (Mexico) Miguel Ángel Reyes-Varela, 6–3, 6–4

=== Women's doubles ===
- (Germany) Mona Barthel / (Czech Republic) Kristýna Plíšková def. (United States) Asia Muhammad / (United States) Maria Sanchez, 6–3, 6–2
