= Viktoriya Tomova =

Bulgarian tennis player (born 1995)

Viktoriya Tomova Виктория Томова
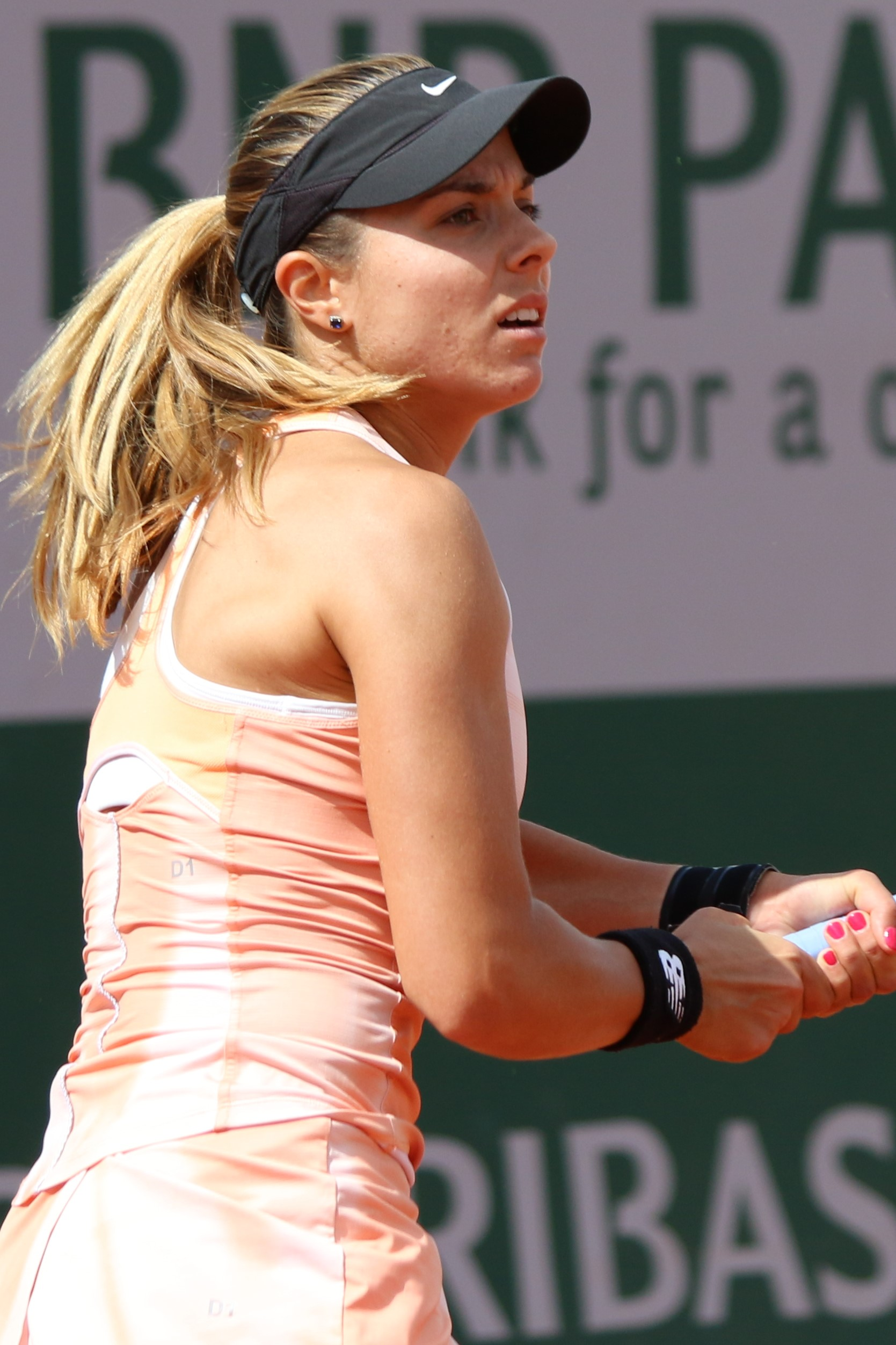
- Tomova at the 2022 French Open
- Country (sports): Bulgaria
- Residence: Sofia, Bulgaria
- Born: 25 February 1995 (age 31) Sofia
- Height: 1.70 m (5 ft 7 in)
- Turned pro: 2009
- Plays: Right (two-handed backhand)
- Prize money: $3,479,499

Singles
- Career record: 512–392
- Career titles: 1 WTA 125, 18 ITF
- Highest ranking: No. 46 (29 July 2024)
- Current ranking: No. 332 (14 September 2026)

Grand Slam singles results
- Australian Open: 2R (2024)
- French Open: 2R (2024)
- Wimbledon: 2R (2018, 2022, 2023, 2025)
- US Open: 1R (2020, 2021, 2023, 2024)

Other tournaments
- Olympic Games: 2R (2024)

Doubles
- Career record: 97–86
- Career titles: 12 ITF
- Highest ranking: No. 137 (8 September 2025)
- Current ranking: No. 1,157 (14 September 2026)

Grand Slam doubles results
- Australian Open: 2R (2025)
- French Open: 3R (2025)
- Wimbledon: 2R (2022)
- US Open: 1R (2024)

Team competitions
- Fed Cup: 13–13 (singles 8–10)
- Last updated on: 14 September 2026.

Viktoriya Konstantinova Tomova-Traycheva (Bulgarian: Виктория Константинова Томова, born 25 February 1995) is a Bulgarian professional tennis player. She reached a career-high singles ranking of world No. 46 on 29 July 2024. Her best doubles ranking is No. 137, achieved on 8 September 2025.

Competing for Bulgaria, she has a win–loss record of 13–13 (as of May 2025) in Billie Jean King Cup competitions.

== Career ==
=== 2016: Top 150 ===
In July 2016, Tomova reached the biggest final of her career so far at the Hungarian Ladies Open, losing to fellow Bulgarian Elitsa Kostova. The following week, she failed to qualify for the Bucharest Open, losing in the final qualifying round to Argentine Nadia Podoroska.

Tomova made her debut at the US Open in the qualifying competition. She finished the year as No. 152 in the world.

=== 2017: WTA Tour debut, top 150 at year end ===
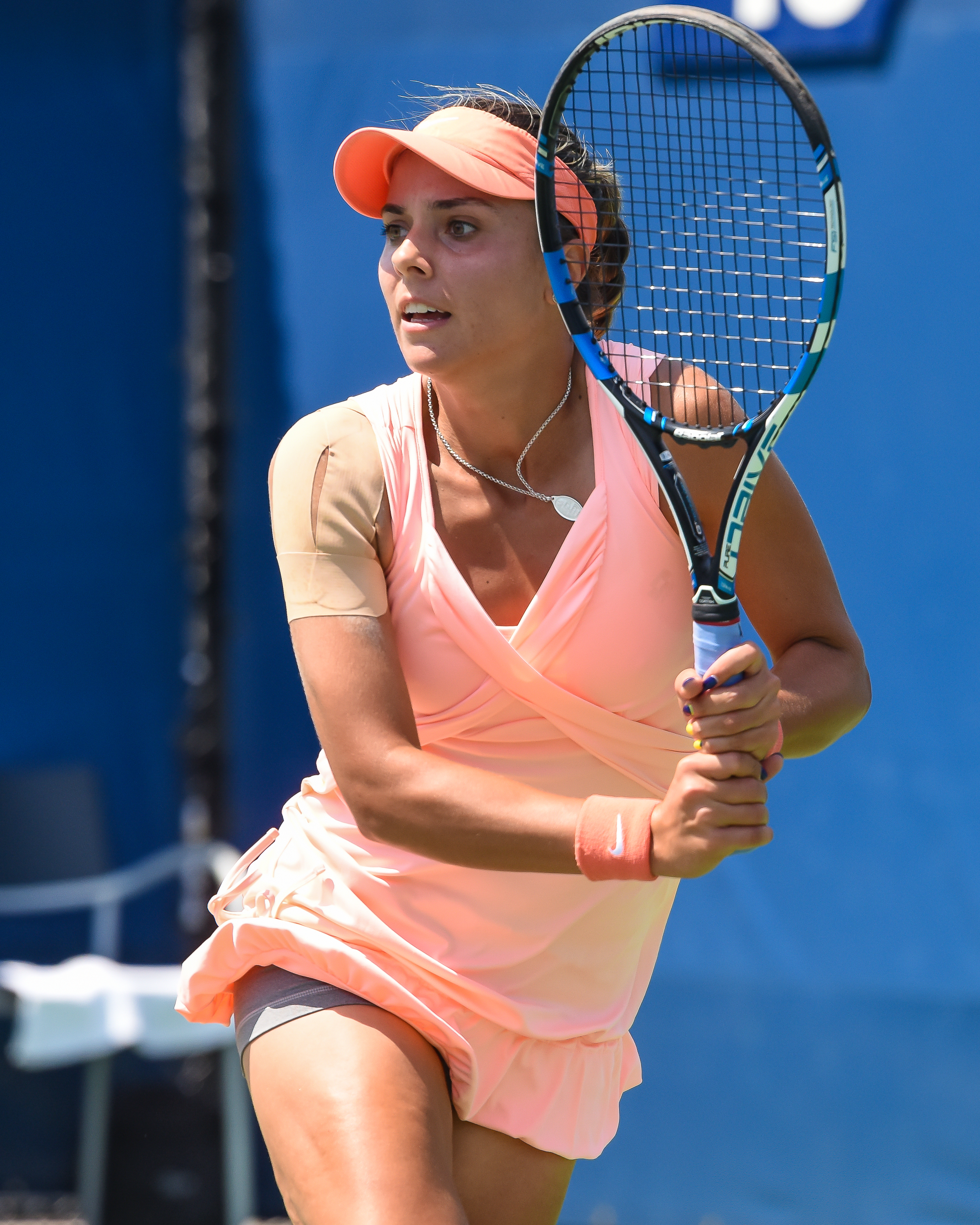
Tomova at the 2017 US Open qualifying

Tomova started the season with a loss to Elitsa Kostova at the qualifying draw of the Brisbane International, and then lost in the first round of qualifying in Sydney. At her debut at the Australian Open, she lost in the qualifying competition to Eri Hozumi. At her Wimbledon debut, she fell in the first round of qualifying. In July, she scored her biggest win so far, defeating Julia Görges in the first round of the Swedish Open. At the US Open she lost in the qualifying competition. In October, she managed to qualify for the Linz Open, where she lost to the previous year's finalist Viktorija Golubic in three sets.

She finished the year ranked No. 141 in the world.

=== 2018: Major debut and first win at Wimbledon ===
Tomova made her debut in the main draw of a Grand Slam tournament, coming through qualifying rounds at the Australian Open as a lucky loser, but then lost in straight sets to Nicole Gibbs.

At the French Open, she was eliminated in the second round of qualifying.

She made her main-draw debut at Wimbledon, going through qualifying and defeating wildcard Tereza Smitková for her first major match win but then lost to Serena Williams in the second round, in straight sets.

=== 2019–20: US Open and WTA 500 debuts ===
Tomova made her WTA 500 main-draw debut by reaching the second round with a win over Alizé Cornet at the 2019 Pan Pacific Open but was defeated by top seed and eventual champion, Naomi Osaka.

In 2020, she made her main-draw debut at the US Open as a direct entry where she was defeated by 22nd seed Amanda Anisimova, in the first round.

Prior to that, Tomova tested positive for COVID-19 while staying in Palermo, Italy, for a prospective tournament. Despite the short season, she finished 2020 at No. 138, a new best year-result.

=== 2021: WTA 1000 debut, WTA Tour semifinal ===
In March, she made her debut at the WTA 1000-level Dubai Tennis Championships entering the main draw as a lucky loser. She lost in the first round to 10th seed Elise Mertens.

In April, Tomova reached for the first time in her career the semifinals of a WTA 250 tournament at the Copa Colsanitas with a three-set victory over Nuria Párrizas Díaz. She lost her semifinal match to fifth seed Tamara Zidanšek. As a result, she reached a new career-high of world No. 122 in the singles rankings, on 10 May 2021.

At the Serbia Open, she advanced to the semifinals as a lucky loser, winning two matches in the same day after two days of postponement due to rain. She lost her semifinal to the eventual champion, fourth seed Paula Badosa. As a result of this run, Tomova rose 15 spots to No. 108. On 28 June, she reached a new career-best ranking of No. 104.

In August, Tomova entered the main draw of her first major for the season, coming through qualifying rounds at the US Open as a lucky loser where she lost to Lauren Davis. At the WTA 125 Open Internacional de Valencia, she reached again the semifinals for the first time at this level and finished the year ranked No. 116 in singles, a new best year-end season ranking.

=== 2022: French Open debut, WTA 125 final & top 100 ===
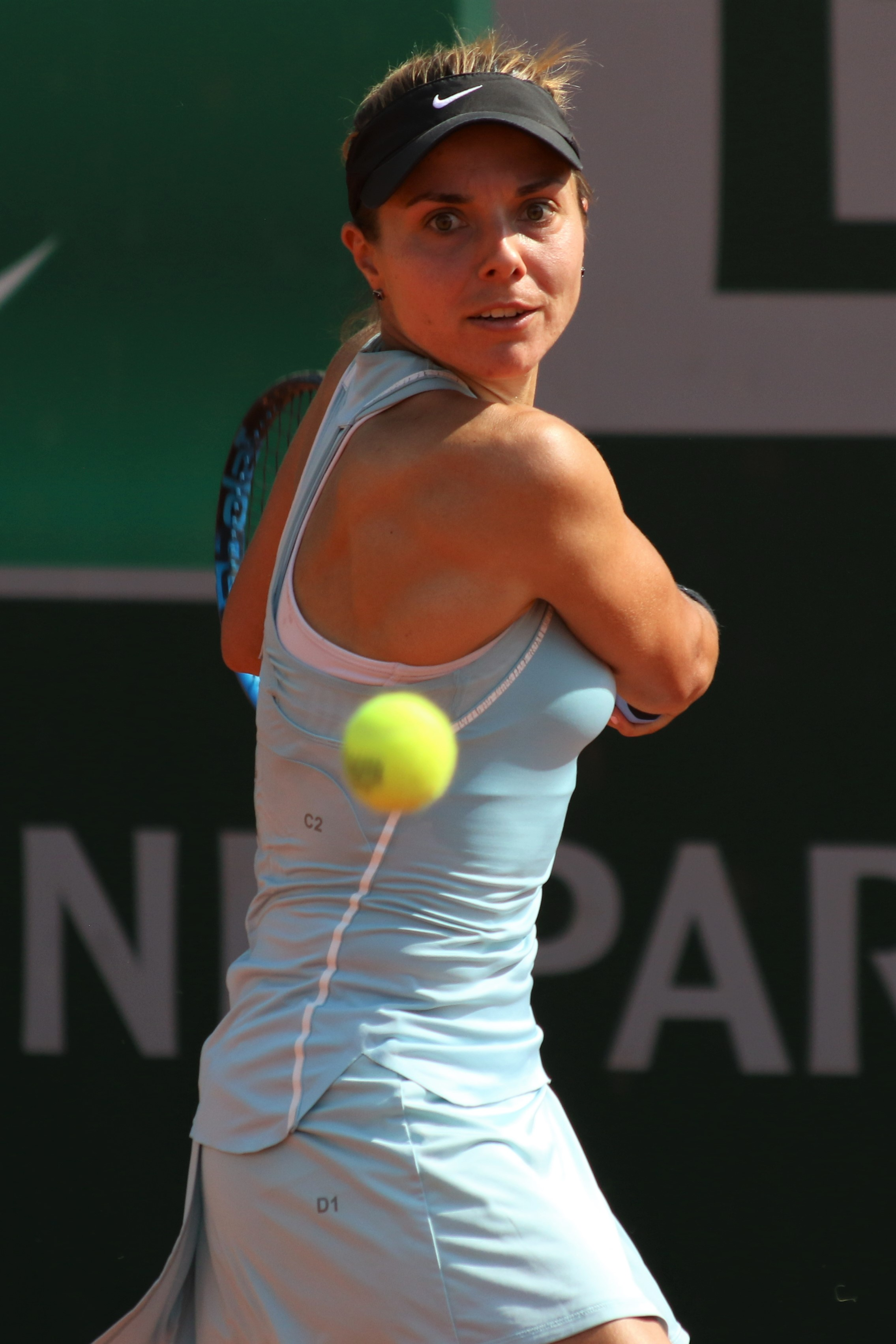
Tomova at the 2022 French Open qualifying

Tomova qualified for the Australian Open to make her second main draw at this major but lost to eventual first-time quarterfinalist Alizé Cornet. On 28 February 2022, she reached a career-high ranking of world No. 103. Defeating Astra Sharma in qualifying, she made her main-draw debut at the Indian Wells Open.

Also at the French Open, she made her debut as a lucky loser, thus completing the set of main-draw appearances in all four major events. However, she lost to world No. 9, Danielle Collins, in the first round. At the Open Internacional de Valencia, she reached quarterfinals for a second consecutive year, defeating Sara Errani, and world No. 69 and second seed, Varvara Gracheva, en route, before losing in three tight sets to eventual finalist Wang Xiyu.

At the WTA 500 Eastbourne International, she replaced as a lucky loser second seed Ons Jabeur. After getting a bye into the second round, she defeated world No. 37, Shelby Rogers, and then advanced to her first WTA 500 quarterfinal after defeating Kirsten Flipkens and taking revenge for the loss in the final round of qualifying. At Wimbledon, she reached the second round for the second time defeating wildcard Daria Gavrilova before losing to world No. 5, Maria Sakkari. At the same tournament, she made her debut in a doubles event at a major, partnering Elisabetta Cocciaretto, where they reached the second round.

At the Swedish Open, she reached again the quarterfinals defeating İpek Öz. She went one step further defeating former top-20 player Mihaela Buzărnescu in the semifinal. There, she lost to eventual champion Jang Su-jeong. As a result, she reached a new career-high singles ranking of 101, on 11 July 2022. Following a semifinal showing at the Polish Open in Grodzisk Mazowiecki, she reached world No. 99 on 8 August 2022 making her the only female representative of Bulgaria in the top 100.

Tomova lost in the last round of qualifying for the US Open to Slovak player Viktória Kužmová. At the Budapest Open, she reached the final of a WTA 125 tournament for the first time defeating two top-100 players, third seed Jasmine Paolini and Julia Grabher, and also two former top-50 players, Anna Karolína Schmiedlová and Océane Dodin. She was defeated in the final by Tamara Korpatsch.

She finished the year ranked No. 90 in the world, on 7 November 2022, a new best year-end ranking. Two weeks later, on 23 November 2022, she was confirmed as a participant at the 2023 United Cup as part of the Bulgarian team.

=== 2023: United Cup debut, top 75 & WTA 125 title ===
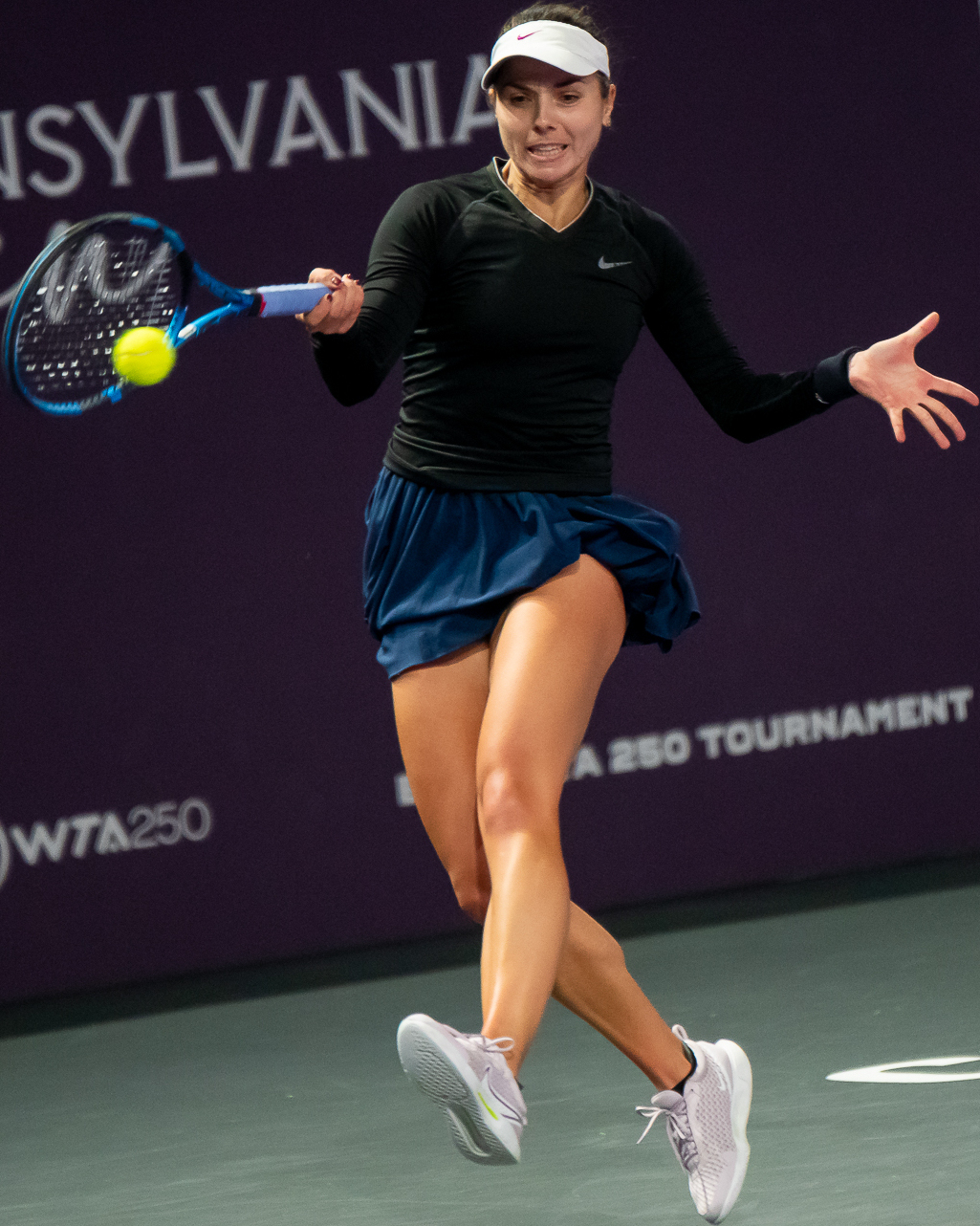
Tomova at the 2023 Transylvania Open

She participated in the United Cup as the No. 1 Bulgarian female player and played one singles match, which she lost to world No. 6, Maria Sakkari. At the Australian Open she lost in the first round to 12th seed Belinda Bencic.

She qualified for the main draw at the Ladies Linz defeating Barbara Haas and former French Open finalist, wildcard Anastasia Pavlyuchenkova. She lost in the first round to another former Roland Garros finalist, Markéta Vondroušová.

Next, she qualified again this time for the main draw of the WTA 500 in Doha defeating three players in the top 100, Maryna Zanevska and two Americans, Lauren Davis and Madison Brengle. However, she lost to seventh seed Belinda Bencic in the first round.

The following week, she reached again the main draw after qualifying at the WTA 1000 Dubai Championships defeating Ankita Raina and Jang Su-jeong. She defeated Kaia Kanepi to record her first WTA 1000 win, before losing to world No. 4 and third seed, Jessica Pegula. As a result, she moved to a new career-high ranking of No. 87 on 27 February 2023.

At the next WTA 1000, on her Miami Open debut, she entered the draw as a lucky loser and defeated fellow qualifier Anna Karolína Schmiedlová in the first round before she lost to 30th seed Danielle Collins.

In April, she reached the final and won the title at the $80k Zaragoza Open defeating fourth seed Tereza Martincová. As a result of winning her biggest title since 2019, she moved to a new career-high in the top 75 and became the first Bulgarian since Tsvetana Pironkova in 2017 to reach this ranking.

At the next WTA 1000, on her debut in the Madrid Open, she entered the draw as the top qualifying seed again as a lucky loser. Again on her debut, as the top qualifying seed in the next WTA 1000 tournament in Rome, she entered the main draw but lost to Yulia Putintseva in the first round, in three sets. Despite this, she reached a new career-high ranking of No. 71, on 22 May 2023.

At the Birmingham Classic, she entered the main draw as a lucky loser but lost to fellow qualifier Tereza Martincová. At Wimbledon, she recorded her first top 30 win, defeating 27th seed Bernarda Pera, before losing in the second round to Katie Boulter.

She won the biggest title of her career at the WTA 125 Chicago Challenger defeating American Claire Liu in straight sets.

=== 2024: WTA 500 semifinal, top 50 & Olympics debuts ===
Tomova entered her first tournament of the season, the Hobart International as a lucky loser and defeated Martina Trevisan in straight sets. She then defeated ninth seed Tatjana Maria, 6–0, 6–1 in a 59 minutes match, to advance to her first hardcourt quarterfinal, before losing to eventual champion, Emma Navarro.

The following week at the Australian Open, Tomova won her first match at this major defeating Kayla Day, She lost to 19th seed Elina Svitolina in the second round.

She entered again the main draw as a lucky loser at the WTA 1000 Qatar Ladies Open. She also qualified for the next WTA 1000 at Dubai. In Indian Wells, she recorded her first win at this tournament defeating former Grand Slam tournament champion Sofia Kenin, in straight sets. She lost to 20th seed Caroline Garcia. At the next WTA 1000, the 2024 Miami Open, she defeated lucky loser Tamara Korpatsch for the first time, having lost to her in her four previous meetings, before retiring due to a back injury while trailing in her next match against 23rd seed Caroline Garcia.

Starting her clay-court season at the Charleston Open, Tomova defeated Mayar Sherif, before losing to third seed Maria Sakkari.

In May at the Morocco Open in Rabat, she reached her third tour-level semifinal defeating qualifier Berfu Cengiz, Wang Yafan and Laura Siegemund, before losing to Peyton Stearns in three sets. At the French Open, she upset 16th seed Ekaterina Alexandrova in straight sets, her first top 20 career win. She lost to Wang Xinyu in three sets.

In June, Tomova qualified for the Paris Summer Olympics. She also reached her third WTA 125 final at Valencia but lost to Ann Li. As a result, she reached a new career-high ranking of No. 63, on 17 June 2024.

At the WTA 500 Bad Homburg Open, Tomova qualified for the main draw and reached the round of 16 by defeating again Tatjana Maria in straight sets. She reached her second grass court quarterfinal and only second at the WTA 500 level, defeating Linda Nosková also in straight sets. She reached her first semifinal at the WTA 500 level with a win over Anna Blinkova in a tight match with a third-set tiebreak, saving five match points. She lost her semifinal match to Donna Vekić but reached the top 50, at world No. 48 in the singles rankings, on 1 July 2024. Seeded fifth at the Prague Open, she defeated the world No. 1 junior, 17-year old wildcard Renáta Jamrichová, saving three match points. She reached another WTA Tour quarterfinal defeating Jana Fett, also in straight sets, before losing to fourth seed and eventual champion, Magda Linette, in three sets. As a result, she reached a career-high ranking of world No. 46 on 29 July 2024.

She recorded her first win at the Summer Olympics in Paris over another Polish player, Magdalena Fręch.

At the newly upgraded WTA 500 Korea Open, she again defeated Tatjana Maria for the third time in the season, this time in three sets. She reached the quarterfinals with a win over Amanda Anisimova, after her retirement in the second set with Tomova leading 7–5, 4–1, but ultimately lost to Veronika Kudermetova. In doubles at the same tournament, she also reached the quarterfinals with her partner Makoto Ninomiya but lost to top seeds Chan Hao-ching and Kudermetova. On her debut at the China Open, Tomova defeated Lesia Tsurenko in straight sets, before losing to 15th seed Paula Badosa. Also on her debut at the WTA 1000 Wuhan Open, Tomova won against Ashlyn Krueger saving four match points. She was eliminated in the second round by fourth seed Coco Gauff.

At the WTA 500 Pan Pacific Open, Tomova defeated defending champion Kudermetova in straight sets, avenging her quarterfinal defeat at the Korea Open a month earlier. She then lost to sixth seed Diana Shnaider.

She finished the year ranked inside the top 50 in the singles rankings.

=== 2025: Cluj-Napoca and Hamburg quarterfinals ===
At the WTA 500 Ladies Linz, Tomova defeated Jéssica Bouzas Maneiro in straight sets to reach the second round, where she lost to third seed Maria Sakkari. At the Transylvania Open in Cluj-Napoca, Tomova came back from a set down to defeat Mayar Sherif and improved her head-to-head record to 2–0. She defeated second seed Olga Danilović in straight sets to reach her first WTA Tour quarterfinal of the season. She lost to fifth seed Kateřina Siniaková.

In Indian Wells, she defeated Danilović again, also in straight sets, before losing to 29th seed Maria Sakkari. In Miami, she overcame Caty McNally to reach the second round, at which point she was eliminated in straight sets by Aryna Sabalenka.

At Wimbledon, she recorded a win over Ons Jabeur, after the former two-time finalist retired in their first-round match. Tomova lost to Sonay Kartal in the second round.

At the Hamburg Open, she defeated third seed Tatjana Maria again, making their head-to-head 4–0. Next, she defeated Astra Sharma dropping only two games to reach her second quarterfinal of the season, which she lost to fifth seed and eventual champion, Loïs Boisson.

== Performance timeline ==
Key
| W | F | SF | QF | #R | RR | Q# | DNQ | A | NH |

(W) winner; (F) finalist; (SF) semifinalist; (QF) quarterfinalist; (#R) rounds 4, 3, 2, 1; (RR) round-robin stage; (Q#) qualification round; (DNQ) did not qualify; (A) absent; (NH) not held; (SR) strike rate (events won / competed); (W–L) win–loss record.
To avoid confusion and double counting, these charts are updated at the conclusion of a tournament or when the player's participation has ended.

Only main-draw results in WTA Tour, Grand Slam tournaments, Billie Jean King Cup, Hopman Cup, United Cup and Olympic Games are included in win–loss records.

=== Singles ===
Current through the 2026 US Open.

| Tournament | 2010 | ... | 2014 | 2015 | 2016 | 2017 | 2018 | 2019 | 2020 | 2021 | 2022 | 2023 | 2024 | 2025 | 2026 | W–L | Win% |
|---|---|---|---|---|---|---|---|---|---|---|---|---|---|---|---|---|---|
Grand Slam tournaments
| Australian Open | A | | A | A | A | Q3 | 1R | Q1 | Q2 | Q2 | 1R | 1R | 2R | 1R | Q3 | 1–5 | 17% |
| French Open | A | | A | A | A | Q1 | Q2 | Q1 | Q1 | Q2 | 1R | 1R | 2R | 1R | Q2 | 1–4 | 20% |
| Wimbledon | A | | A | A | A | Q1 | 2R | Q1 | NH | Q2 | 2R | 2R | 1R | 2R | Q1 | 4–5 | 44% |
| US Open | A | | A | A | Q3 | Q3 | Q1 | Q1 | 1R | 1R | Q3 | 1R | 1R | Q2 | A | 0–4 | 0% |
| Win–loss | 0–0 | | 0–0 | 0–0 | 0–0 | 0–0 | 1–2 | 0–0 | 0–1 | 0–1 | 1–3 | 1–4 | 2–4 | 1–3 | 0–0 | 6–18 | 25% |
National representation
| Summer Olympics | A | | NH | | A | NH | | | | A | NH | | 2R | NH | | 1–1 | 50% |
| Billie Jean King Cup (Note: Formerly known as Fed Cup until 2020.) | A | | Z1 | Z1 | A | Z1 | Z1 | Z1 | Z1 (Note: Edition is split into the two years due to COVID-19.) | | Z1 | | Z1 | A | | 7–9 | 44% |
WTA 1000
| Qatar Open (Note: The first Premier 5 event of the year has switched back and forth between the Dubai Tennis Championships and the Qatar Ladies Open from 2009 until 2024. Dubai was classified as a Premier 5 event from 2009 to 2011 before being succeeded by Doha for the 2012–2014 period. In 2015, Dubai regained its Premier 5 status while Doha was demoted to Premier status. The Premier 5 tournaments were reclassified as WTA 1000 tournaments in 2021. In 2024, both tournaments became WTA 1000 events.) | A | | A | A | A | A | A | A | A | A | A | A | 1R | A | A | 0–1 | 0% |
| Dubai | A | | A | A | A | A | A | A | A | 1R | A | 2R | 1R | Q1 | A | 1–3 | 25% |
| Indian Wells | A | | A | A | A | Q1 | A | A | NH | Q1 | 1R | A | 2R | 2R | Q1 | 2–3 | 40% |
| Miami Open | Q1 | | A | A | A | Q1 | Q1 | A | NH | Q1 | A | 2R | 2R | 2R | Q1 | 3–3 | 50% |
| Madrid Open | A | | A | A | A | A | A | A | NH | A | A | 1R | 1R | 1R | Q1 | 0–3 | 0% |
| Italian Open | A | | A | A | A | A | A | A | A | A | A | 1R | Q2 | 1R | A | 0–2 | 0% |
| Canadian Open | A | | A | A | A | A | A | A | NH | A | A | A | 1R | 1R | A | 0–2 | 0% |
| Cincinnati Open | A | | A | A | A | A | A | A | A | A | A | A | 1R | 2R | A | 1–2 | 33% |
| China Open | A | | A | A | A | A | A | A | NH | | | A | 2R | Q2 | | 1–1 | 50% |
| Wuhan Open | A | | A | A | A | A | A | A | NH | | | | 2R | Q2 | | 1–1 | 50% |
| Win–loss | 0–0 | | 0–0 | 0–0 | 0–0 | 0–0 | 0–0 | 0–0 | 0–0 | 0–1 | 0–1 | 2–4 | 4–9 | 3–6 | | 9–21 | 30% |
Career statistics
| | 2010 | ... | 2014 | 2015 | 2016 | 2017 | 2018 | 2019 | 2020 | 2021 | 2022 | 2023 | 2024 | 2025 | 2026 | W–L | Win% |
| Tournaments | 0 | | 0 (Note: During the season, she did not play in the main draw of any tour-level tournaments. However, she played at the Billie Jean King Cup, which is not counted as a played tournament but matches counted.) | 0 | 0 | 3 | 6 | 4 | 3 | 11 | 10 | 18 | 27 | 20 | | Career total: 102 | |
| Titles | 0 | | 0 | 0 | 0 | 0 | 0 | 0 | 0 | 0 | 0 | 0 | 0 | 0 | | Career total: 0 | |
| Finals | 0 | | 0 | 0 | 0 | 0 | 0 | 0 | 0 | 0 | 0 | 0 | 0 | 0 | | Career total: 0 | |
| Overall win–loss | 0–0 | | 0–1 | 0–1 | 0–0 | 3–4 | 4–7 | 2–6 | 3–4 | 6–11 | 7–11 | 4–18 | 22–27 | 9–20 | | 60–110 | 35% |
| Year-end ranking (Note: 2009: WTA ranking–906, ... 2011: WTA ranking–780, 2012: WTA ranking–528, 2013: WTA ranking–397.) | 852 | | 332 | 474 | 152 | 141 | 156 | 159 | 138 | 116 | 90 | 96 | 49 | 134 | | $3,290,783 | |

== WTA 125 finals ==
=== Singles: 3 (1 title, 2 runner-ups) ===
| Result | W–L | Date | Tournament | Surface | Opponent | Score |
|---|---|---|---|---|---|---|
| Loss | 0–1 | Sep 2022 | Budapest Pro Open, Hungary | Clay | (Germany) Tamara Korpatsch | 6–7^{(3–7)}, 7–6^{(7–4)}, 0–6 |
| Win | 1–1 | Aug 2023 | Chicago Challenger, United States | Hard | (United States) Claire Liu | 6–1, 6–4 |
| Loss | 1–2 | Jun 2024 | Internacional de Valencia, Spain | Clay | (United States) Ann Li | 3–6, 4–6 |

== ITF Circuit finals ==
=== Singles: 26 (18 titles, 8 runner-ups) ===
| Legend $100,000 tournaments (1–1) $80,000 tournaments (2–1) $50,000 tournaments (1–0) $25,000 tournaments (3–2) $10/15,000 tournaments (11–4) | Finals by surface Hard (8–1) Clay (10–7) |

| Result | W–L | Date | Tournament | Tier | Surface | Opponent | Score |
|---|---|---|---|---|---|---|---|
| Loss | 0–1 | Sep 2010 | ITF Sarajevo, Bosnia & Herzegovina | 10,000 | Clay | (Croatia) Ani Mijačika | 1–6, 2–6 |
| Win | 1–1 | Nov 2011 | ITF Monastir, Tunisia | 10,000 | Hard | (Slovakia) Klaudia Boczová | 3–1 ret. |
| Win | 2–1 | Sep 2012 | ITF Varna, Bulgaria | 10,000 | Clay | (Ukraine) Anastasiya Vasylyeva | 6–1, 6–4 |
| Win | 3–1 | Jul 2013 | ITF Prokuplje, Serbia | 10,000 | Clay | (Switzerland) Xenia Knoll | 7–6^{(2)}, 6–2 |
| Loss | 3–2 | Oct 2013 | ITF Burgas, Bulgaria | 10,000 | Clay | (Bulgaria) Dia Evtimova | 1–6, 2–6 |
| Win | 4–2 | Apr 2014 | ITF Bol, Croatia | 10,000 | Clay | (Croatia) Iva Mekovec | 6–1, 6–2 |
| Loss | 4–3 | May 2014 | ITF Bol, Croatia | 10,000 | Clay | (Switzerland) Lara Michel | 4–6, 3–6 |
| Win | 5–3 | Jun 2014 | ITF Sarajevo, Bosnia & Herzegovina | 15,000 | Clay | (United Kingdom) Eleanor Dean | 6–4, 6–3 |
| Win | 6–3 | Nov 2014 | ITF Sousse, Tunisia | 10,000 | Hard | (United States) Nicole Melichar | 6–3, 6–2 |
| Win | 7–3 | Nov 2015 | ITF Heraklion, Greece | 10,000 | Hard | (France) Margot Yerolymos | 6–3, 6–2 |
| Win | 8–3 | Nov 2015 | ITF Heraklion, Greece | 10,000 | Hard | (Croatia) Nina Alibalić | 3–6, 6–3, 6–3 |
| Loss | 8–4 | Jan 2016 | ITF Antalya, Turkey | 10,000 | Clay | (Georgia (country)) Ekaterine Gorgodze | 4–6, 0–6 |
| Win | 9–4 | Mar 2016 | ITF Antalya, Turkey | 10,000 | Clay | (Sweden) Susanne Celik | 4–6, 6–2, 7–5 |
| Win | 10–4 | Apr 2016 | ITF Antalya, Turkey | 10,000 | Hard | (France) Caroline Romeo | 6–0, 6–4 |
| Win | 11–4 | Apr 2016 | ITF Antalya, Turkey | 10,000 | Hard | (Slovakia) Viktória Kužmová | 7–6^{(5)}, 6–2 |
| Win | 12–4 | Jun 2016 | Szeged Open, Hungary | 50,000 | Clay | (Greece) Maria Sakkari | 4–6, 6–0, 6–4 |
| Loss | 12–5 | Jul 2016 | Hungarian Pro Open | 100,000 | Clay | (Bulgaria) Elitsa Kostova | 0–6, 6–7^{(3)} |
| Loss | 12–6 | Sep 2016 | Sofia Cup, Bulgaria | 25,000 | Clay | (Russia) Viktoria Kamenskaya | 4–6, 7–6^{(5)}, 0–6 |
| Win | 13–6 | Apr 2017 | ITF İstanbul, Turkey | 25,000 | Hard (i) | (Slovakia) Viktória Kužmová | 6–4, 4–6, 6–2 |
| Win | 14–6 | Sep 2017 | Sofia Cup, Bulgaria | 25,000 | Clay | (Italy) Jessica Pieri | 7–6^{(7)}, 4–6, 6–3 |
| Win | 15–6 | Jul 2019 | Open de Biarritz, France | W80 | Clay | (Montenegro) Danka Kovinić | 6–2, 5–7, 7–5 |
| Loss | 15–7 | Feb 2020 | GB Pro-Series Glasgow, UK | W25 | Hard (i) | (Denmark) Clara Tauson | 4–6, 0–6 |
| Win | 16–7 | Mar 2020 | ITF Sunderland, UK | W25 | Hard (i) | (United Kingdom) Emma Raducanu | 4–6, 6–4, 6–3 |
| Loss | 16–8 | Apr 2022 | Oeiras Ladies Open, Portugal | W80 | Clay | (Italy) Elisabetta Cocciaretto | 6–7^{(5)}, 6–2, 5–7 |
| Win | 17–8 | Apr 2023 | Zaragoza Open, Spain | W80 | Clay | (Czech Republic) Tereza Martincová | 4–6, 6–2, 6–3 |
| Win | 18–8 | Nov 2023 | Open de Valencia, Spain | W100 | Clay | (Romania) Jaqueline Cristian | 7–5, 6–3 |

=== Doubles: 20 (12 titles, 8 runner-ups) ===
| Legend $25,000 tournaments (1–2) $10/15,000 tournaments (11–6) | Finals by surface Hard (3–4) Clay (9–4) |

| Result | W–L | Date | Tournament | Tier | Surface | Partner | Opponents | Score |
|---|---|---|---|---|---|---|---|---|
| Win | 1–0 | Nov 2011 | ITF Monastir, Tunisia | 10,000 | Hard | (Bosnia and Herzegovina) Anita Husarić | (Ukraine) Anastasia Kharchenko (United States) Nicole Melichar | 6–3, 5–7, [10–5] |
| Loss | 1–1 | Sep 2012 | ITF Varna, Bulgaria | 10,000 | Clay | (Bulgaria) Borislava Botusharova | (Belgium) Michaela Boev (Ukraine) Anastasiya Vasylyeva | 1–6, 5–7 |
| Win | 2–1 | Jun 2013 | ITF Niš, Serbia | 10,000 | Clay | (Australia) Viktorija Rajicic | (Slovenia) Tjaša Šrimpf (Bosnia and Herzegovina) Nerma Ćaluk | 6–1, 6–2 |
| Win | 3–1 | Jun 2013 | ITF Prokuplje, Serbia | 10,000 | Clay | (Australia) Viktorija Rajicic | (Croatia) Ema Mikulčić (Germany) Dejana Raickovic | 6–2, 7–5 |
| Loss | 3–2 | Jul 2013 | ITF Prokuplje, Serbia | 10,000 | Clay | (Australia) Viktorija Rajicic | (Bulgaria) Dalia Zafirova (North Macedonia) Lina Gjorcheska | 3–6, 0–6 |
| Win | 4–2 | Sep 2013 | Sofia Cup, Bulgaria | 25,000 | Clay | (Bulgaria) Dia Evtimova | (Spain) Beatriz García Vidagany (Hungary) Réka Luca Jani | 6–4, 2–6, [10–6] |
| Win | 5–2 | Oct 2013 | ITF Burgas, Bulgaria | 10,000 | Clay | (Bulgaria) Dia Evtimova | (Italy) Federica Arcidiacono (Bulgaria) Julia Terziyska | 6–4, 6–3 |
| Loss | 5–3 | Jan 2014 | ITF Sunderland, UK | 25,000 | Hard (i) | (Hungary) Ágnes Bukta | (United Kingdom) Jocelyn Rae (United Kingdom) Anna Smith | 1–6, 1–6 |
| Loss | 5–4 | Feb 2014 | ITF Tallinn, Estonia | 15,000 | Hard (i) | (Hungary) Ágnes Bukta | (Georgia (country)) Sofia Shapatava (Slovenia) Maša Zec Peškirič | 4–6, 6–7^{(4)} |
| Win | 6–4 | Apr 2014 | ITF Šibenik, Croatia | 10,000 | Clay | (Hungary) Ágnes Bukta | (Czech Republic) Eva Rutarová (Czech Republic) Karolína Stuchlá | 7–6^{(12)}, 6–1 |
| Win | 7–4 | Apr 2014 | ITF Bol, Croatia | 10,000 | Clay | (Hungary) Ágnes Bukta | (Czech Republic) Karolína Stuchlá (France) Carla Touly | 6–2, 6–1 |
| Win | 8–4 | May 2014 | ITF Bol, Croatia | 10,000 | Clay | (Croatia) Ema Mikulčić | (Belgium) Justine De Sutter (Netherlands) Monique Zuur | 6–3, 6–1 |
| Win | 9–4 | Jun 2014 | ITF Sarajevo, BiH | 15,000 | Clay | (Czech Republic) Barbora Krejčíková | (Germany) Carolin Daniels (Turkey) Melis Sezer | 7–6^{(3)}, 6–2 |
| Win | 10–4 | Jun 2014 | ITF Amstelveen, Netherlands | 10,000 | Clay | (United States) Bernarda Pera | (Argentina) Tatiana Búa (Brazil) Beatriz Haddad Maia | 6–0, 2–1 ret. |
| Loss | 10–5 | Nov 2015 | ITF Heraklion, Greece | 10,000 | Hard | (Switzerland) Karin Kennel | (Greece) Eleni Christofi (Uzbekistan) Vlada Katic | 6–4, 3–6, [1–10] |
| Win | 11–5 | Nov 2015 | ITF Heraklion, Greece | 10,000 | Hard | (Switzerland) Karin Kennel | (Thailand) Helen De Cesare (Uzbekistan) Vlada Katic | 6–2, 6–4 |
| Loss | 11–6 | Feb 2016 | ITF Antalya, Turkey | 10,000 | Clay | (Croatia) Adrijana Lekaj | (United States) Dasha Ivanova (Romania) Elena-Gabriela Ruse | 6–7^{(1)}, 1–6 |
| Loss | 11–7 | Apr 2016 | ITF Antalya, Turkey | 10,000 | Hard | (Ukraine) Anastasiya Vasylyeva | (Turkey) Ayla Aksu (Turkey) Melis Sezer | 3–6, 3–6 |
| Win | 12–7 | Apr 2016 | ITF Antalya, Turkey | 10,000 | Hard | (United Kingdom) Harriet Dart | (Armenia) Ani Amiraghyan (Romania) Daiana Negreanu | w/o |
| Loss | 12–8 | Sep 2016 | Sofia Cup, Bulgaria | 25,000 | Clay | (North Macedonia) Lina Gjorcheska | (Greece) Valentini Grammatikopoulou (Netherlands) Quirine Lemoine | 4–6, 6–4, [6–10] |

== National representation ==
=== Billie Jean King Cup ===
Tomova debuted in Bulgaria Fed Cup team in 2014; since then she has accumulated a 8–10 singles record and a 5–3 doubles record (13–13 overall).

==== Singles (8–10) ====
| Edition | Round | Date | Location | Against | Surface | Opponent | W/L | Score |
|---|---|---|---|---|---|---|---|---|
| 2014 | Z1 RR | 7 Feb 2014 | Budapest (HUN) | Belarus | Hard (I) | Olga Govortsova | L | 3–6, 4–6 |
| 2015 | Z1 PO9 | 7 Feb 2015 | Budapest (HUN) | Ukraine | Hard (i) | Kateryna Kozlova | L | 4–6, 0–6 |
| 2017 | Z1 RR | 8 Feb 2017 | Tallinn (EST) | Israel | Hard (i) | Deniz Khazaniuk | W | 6–4, 5–7, 6–2 |
| 2017 | Z1 RR | 9 Feb 2017 | Tallinn (EST) | Serbia | Hard (i) | Ivana Jorović | L | 1–6, 1–6 |
| 2018 | Z1 RR | 7 Feb 2018 | Tallinn (EST) | Serbia | Hard (i) | Dejana Radanović | L | 3–6, 4–6 |
| 2018 | Z1 RR | 8 Feb 2018 | Tallinn (EST) | Georgia | Hard (i) | Ekaterine Gorgodze | W | 6–2, 6–3 |
| 2019 | Z1 RR | 6 Feb 2019 | Zielona Góra (POL) | Estonia | Hard (i) | Anett Kontaveit | L | 1–6, 7–6^{(7–4)}, 1–6 |
| 2019 | Z1 RR | 7 Feb 2019 | Zielona Góra (POL) | Ukraine | Hard (i) | Kateryna Kozlova | W | 6–3, 6–2 |
| 2019 | Z1 RR | 8 Feb 2019 | Zielona Góra (POL) | Sweden | Hard (i) | Johanna Larsson | L | 4–6, 4–6 |
| 2020–21 | Z1 RR | 5 Feb 2020 | Tallinn (EST) | Croatia | Hard (i) | Jana Fett | W | 6–2, 6–4 |
| 2020–21 | Z1 RR | 6 Feb 2020 | Tallinn (EST) | Ukraine | Hard (i) | Elina Svitolina | L | 6–7^{(5–7)}, 3–6 |
| 2020–21 | Z1 RPO | 8 Feb 2020 | Tallinn (EST) | Greece | Hard (i) | Despina Papamichail | W | 6–2, 6–4 |
| 2022 | Z1 RR | 13 Apr 2022 | Antalya (TUR) | Sweden | Clay | Caijsa Hennemann | W | 6–1, 6–1 |
| 2022 | Z1 RR | 14 Apr 2022 | Antalya (TUR) | Slovenia | Clay | Kaja Juvan | L | 1–6, 2–6 |
| 2022 | Z1 RR | 15 Apr 2022 | Antalya (TUR) | (Georgia (country)) Georgia | Clay | Mariam Bolkvadze | W | 6–3 ret. |
| 2024 | Z1 RR | 8 Apr 2024 | Oeiras (POR) | Hungary | Clay | Natália Szabanin | W | 6–3, 6–3 |
| 2024 | Z1 RR | 9 Apr 2024 | Oeiras (POR) | Denmark | Clay | Clara Tauson | L | 4–6, 2–6 |
| 2024 | Z1 PO | 12 Apr 2024 | Oeiras (POR) | Norway | Clay | Ulrikke Eikeri | L | 6–2, 6–7^{(4–7)}, 3–6 |

==== Doubles (5–3) ====
| Edition | Round | Date | Location | Partner | Surface | Against | Opponents | W/L | Score |
|---|---|---|---|---|---|---|---|---|---|
| 2014 | Z1 RR | 4 Feb 2014 | Budapest (HUN) | Isabella Shinikova | Hard (i) | Portugal | Bárbara Luz; Inês Murta | W | 6–2, 7–5 |
| 2014 | Z1 RR | 7 Feb 2014 | Budapest (HUN) | Elitsa Kostova | Hard (i) | Belarus | Ilona Kremen; Aliaksandra Sasnovich | W | 4–6, 6–3, 7–5 |
| 2015 | Z1 RR | 4 Feb 2015 | Budapest (HUN) | Dia Evtimova | Hard (i) | Portugal | Michelle Larcher de Brito; Bárbara Luz | W | 6–0, 6–3 |
| 2015 | Z1 RR | 5 Feb 2015 | Budapest (HUN) | Dia Evtimova | Hard (i) | Belarus | Aliaksandra Sasnovich; Vera Lapko | L | 5–7, 1–6 |
| 2019 | Z1 RR | 6 Feb 2019 | Zielona Góra (POL) | Isabella Shinikova | Hard (i) | Estonia | Anett Kontaveit; Maileen Nuudi | W | 6–2, 6–2 |
| 2019 | Z1 RR | 7 Feb 2019 | Zielona Góra (POL) | Isabella Shinikova | Hard (i) | Ukraine | Nadiia Kichenok; Marta Kostyuk | L | 0–6, 6–7^{(0–7)} |
| 2020–21 | Z1 RR | 5 Feb 2020 | Tallinn (EST) | Isabella Shinikova | Hard (i) | Croatia | Jana Fett; Darija Jurak | L | 2–6, 6–3, 1–6 |
| 2022 | Z1 RR | 13 Apr 2022 | Antalya (TUR) | Julia Terziyska | Clay | Sweden | Kajsa Rinaldo Persson; Julita Saner | W | 6–1, 2–6, 6–0 |

=== United Cup ===
==== Singles (0–1) ====
| Edition | Round | Date | Location | Against | Surface | Opponent | W/L | Score |
|---|---|---|---|---|---|---|---|---|
| 2023 | RR | 30 Dec 2022 | Perth (AUS) | Greece | Hard | Maria Sakkari | L | 3–6, 2–6 |
