= Oracle Challenger Series – Chicago =

Professional tennis tournament

Defunct tennis tournament
- Event name: Oracle Challenger Series – Chicago
- Founded: 2018
- Location: Chicago, United States
- Venue: XS Tennis Village
- Surface: Hard

Current champions (2023)
- Women's singles: (Bulgaria) Viktoriya Tomova
- Women's doubles: (Norway) Ulrikke Eikeri (Estonia) Ingrid Neel
WTA Tour
- Category: WTA 125K series
- Draw: 32S / 8Q / 8D
- Prize money: $115,000

The Oracle Challenger Series – Chicago was a professional tennis tournament played outdoor on hardcourts. It was part of the Women's Tennis Association (WTA) 125K series. The tournament took place at the XS Tennis Village in Chicago, United States. From 2021 onwards, it became exclusively a WTA 125 tournament. It was part of the ATP Challenger Tour in 2018.

== Past finals ==
=== Men's singles ===
Year	Champion	Runner-up	Score
2018	(Uzbekistan) Denis Istomin	(United States) Reilly Opelka	6–4, 6–2

=== Women's singles ===
Year	Champion	Runner-up	Score
2018	(Croatia) Petra Martić	(Germany) Mona Barthel	6–4, 6–1
2019–20	Not held		
2021	(Denmark) Clara Tauson	(United Kingdom) Emma Raducanu	6–1, 2–6, 6–4
2022	Not held		
2023	(Bulgaria) Viktoriya Tomova	(United States) Claire Liu	6–1, 6–4

=== Men's doubles ===
Year	Champions	Runners-up	Score
2018	(United Kingdom) Luke Bambridge (United Kingdom) Neal Skupski	(India) Leander Paes (Mexico) Miguel Ángel Reyes-Varela	6–3, 6–4

=== Women's doubles ===
Year	Champions	Runners-up	Score
2018	(Germany) Mona Barthel (Czech Republic) Kristýna Plíšková	(United States) Asia Muhammad (United States) Maria Sanchez	6–3, 6–2
2019–20	Not held		
2021	(Japan) Eri Hozumi (Thailand) Peangtarn Plipuech	(Germany) Mona Barthel (Chinese Taipei) Hsieh Yu-chieh	7–5, 6–2
2022	Not held		
2023	(Norway) Ulrikke Eikeri (Estonia) Ingrid Neel	(Spain) Cristina Bucșa; Alexandra Panova	walkover
