= 2024 ATX Open =

- Date: 26 February – 3 March
- Edition: 2nd
- Category: WTA 250
- Draw: 32S / 24Q / 16D
- Prize money: $267,085
- Surface: Hard (Outdoor)
- Location: Austin, Texas, United States
- Venue: Westwood Country Club

Champions

Singles
- (China) Yuan Yue

Doubles
- (Australia) Olivia Gadecki / (United Kingdom) Olivia Nicholls
← 2023 ·	ATX Open	· 2025 →

The 2024 ATX Open was a tournament for female professional tennis players played on outdoor hard courts. It was the second edition of the event, a WTA 250 tournament on the 2024 WTA Tour. The event took place at The Westwood Country Club in Austin, United States, from 26 February through 3 March 2024.

== Champions ==
=== Singles ===
- (China) Yuan Yue def. (China) Wang Xiyu, 6–4, 7–6^{(7–4)}

=== Doubles ===
- (Australia) Olivia Gadecki / (United Kingdom) Olivia Nicholls def. (Poland) Katarzyna Kawa / (Netherlands) Bibiane Schoofs, 6–2, 6–4

== Singles main draw entrants ==
=== Seeds ===
Country	Player	Rank^{1}	Seed
UKR	Anhelina Kalinina	32	1
USA	Sloane Stephens	41	2
USA	Danielle Collins	46	3
ITA	Lucia Bronzetti	60	4
FRA	Diane Parry	63	5
CHN	Wang Xiyu	64	6
USA	Peyton Stearns	65	7
CHN	Yuan Yue	69	8

- Rankings are as of 19 February 2024.

=== Other entrants ===
The following players received wildcards into the singles main draw:

- (Mexico) Fernanda Contreras Gómez
- (Andorra) Victoria Jiménez Kasintseva
- (United States) Katie Volynets

The following players received entry using a protected ranking into the singles main draw:

- ~~(United States) Caty McNally~~
- (Latvia) Anastasija Sevastova

The following players received entry from the qualifying draw:

- (Czech Republic) Sára Bejlek
- (Australia) Olivia Gadecki
- (Canada) Rebecca Marino
- (Czech Republic) Tereza Martincová
- (France) Jessika Ponchet
- (United States) Sachia Vickery

=== Withdrawals ===
- Elina Avanesyan → replaced by (Australia) Arina Rodionova
- Victoria Azarenka → replaced by (France) Alizé Cornet
- (Switzerland) Viktorija Golubic → replaced by (Mexico) Renata Zarazúa
- (United States) Ashlyn Krueger → replaced by (Latvia) Darja Semeņistaja
- (United States) Caty McNally → replaced by (Colombia) Emiliana Arango
- (Egypt) Mayar Sherif → replaced by Kamilla Rakhimova

== Doubles main draw entrants ==
=== Seeds ===
Country	Player	Country	Player	Rank^{†}	Seed
GEO	Oksana Kalashnikova	UKR	Nadiia Kichenok	108	1
KAZ	Anna Danilina	CHN	Zhang Shuai	122	2
	Irina Khromacheva		Yana Sizikova	129	3
SVK	Tereza Mihalíková	BEL	Yanina Wickmayer	146	4

- ^{1} Rankings as of 19 February 2024.

=== Other entrants ===
The following pairs received wildcards into the doubles main draw:

- (Australia) Maya Joint / (Ukraine) Sabina Zeynalova
- (United Kingdom) Samantha Murray Sharan / (France) Jessika Ponchet
