= 2025 ATX Open – Singles =

Singles
- 2025 ATX Open

Final
- Champion: (United States) Jessica Pegula
- Runner-up: (United States) McCartney Kessler
- Score: 7–5, 6–2

Details
- Draw: 32
- Seeds: 8

Events
Singles	Doubles
← 2024 ·	ATX Open	· 2026 →

Jessica Pegula defeated McCartney Kessler in the final, 7–5, 6–2, to win the singles title at the 2025 ATX Open. It was her seventh WTA Tour title.

Yuan Yue was the defending champion, but lost in the first round to Kimberly Birrell.

== Seeds ==
1. (United States) Jessica Pegula (champion)
2. Diana Shnaider (second round)
3. (United States) Peyton Stearns (first round)
4. (China) Yuan Yue (first round)
5. (United States) McCartney Kessler (final)
6. (Japan) Moyuka Uchijima (first round)
7. (United States) Katie Volynets (first round)
8. (Netherlands) Suzan Lamens (second round)

== Draw ==
=== Key ===
- Q = Qualifier
- WC = Wild card
- LL = Lucky loser
- Alt = Alternate
- ITF = ITF entry
- PR = Protected ranking
- SR = Special ranking
- SE = Special exempt
- JE = Junior exempt
- JR = Junior Accelerator Programme entrant
- CO = College Accelerator Programme entrant
- NG = Next Gen Accelerator Program entrant
- w/o = Walkover
- r = Retired
- d = Defaulted

=== Finals ===
Semifinals
1	(United States) Jessica Pegula	6	4	6
WC	(Australia) Ajla Tomljanović	1	6	3
(Belgium) Greet Minnen	5	4
5	(United States) McCartney Kessler	7	6

Final
1	(United States) Jessica Pegula	7	6
5	(United States) McCartney Kessler	5	2

=== Top half ===
First round
1	(United States) J Pegula	6	3
(Netherlands) A Rus	3	2^{r}
WC	(United States) M Rapolu	2	4
(Spain) N Párrizas Díaz	6	6
(Germany) T Maria	6	4	6
(Hungary) A Bondár	4	6	1
A Blinkova	4	6	6
6	(Japan) M Uchijima	6	4	0
4	(China) Y Yuan	6^{5}	6^{5}
(Australia) K Birrell	7^{7}	7^{7}
Q	(Slovenia) K Juvan	6	3	2
Q	(Japan) E Shibahara	2	6	6
WC	(Czech Republic) P Kvitová	6	4	4
PR	(United Kingdom) J Burrage	3	6	6
WC	(Australia) A Tomljanović	7^{7}	7
7	(United States) K Volynets	6^{3}	5

Second round
1	(United States) J Pegula	6	6
(Spain) N Párrizas Díaz	1	3
(Germany) T Maria	2	2
A Blinkova	6	6
(Australia) K Birrell	3	6	4
Q	(Japan) E Shibahara	6	4	6
PR	(United Kingdom) J Burrage	6	3	0
WC	(Australia) A Tomljanović	4	6	6

Quarterfinals
1	(United States) J Pegula	6	6
A Blinkova	2	2
Q	(Japan) E Shibahara	5	6	6^{8}
WC	(Australia) A Tomljanović	7	3	7^{10}

Semifinals
1	(United States) J Pegula	6	4	6
WC	(Australia) A Tomljanović	1	6	3

=== Bottom half ===
First round
8	(Netherlands) S Lamens	1	6	6
K Rakhimova	6	3	4
(Belgium) G Minnen	5	6	6
Q	(China) S Wei	7	3	2
Q	A Zakharova	2	7	4
(United States) C Dolehide	6	5	6
(France) V Gracheva	6	6
3	(United States) P Stearns	2	3
5	(United States) M Kessler	6	7
LL	(Switzerland) V Golubic	2	5
Q	(Spain) C Bucșa	6	6
(United States) B Pera	3	4
(Romania) S Cîrstea	6	0	6
(Germany) L Siegemund	3	6	1
Q	T Prozorova	6	2	5
2/WC	D Shnaider	0	6	7

Second round
8	(Netherlands) S Lamens	1	0
(Belgium) G Minnen	6	6
(United States) C Dolehide	5	6	6
(France) V Gracheva	7	2	2
5	(United States) M Kessler	5	6	7^{7}
Q	(Spain) C Bucșa	7	3	6^{4}
(Romania) S Cîrstea	6	2	6
2/WC	D Shnaider	3	6	4

Quarterfinals
(Belgium) G Minnen	6	7
(United States) C Dolehide	3	5
5	(United States) M Kessler	5	6	6
(Romania) S Cîrstea	7	4	1

Semifinals
(Belgium) G Minnen	5	4
5	(United States) M Kessler	7	6

== Qualifying ==
=== Seeds ===
1. (Spain) Cristina Bucșa (qualified)
2. (Switzerland) Viktorija Golubic (qualifying competition, lucky loser)
3. (Canada) Rebecca Marino (qualifying competition)
4. (Thailand) Mananchaya Sawangkaew (qualifying competition)
5. (Canada) Marina Stakusic (first round, retired)
6. (China) Wei Sijia (qualified)
7. (Australia) Maddison Inglis (qualifying competition)
8. Anastasia Zakharova (qualified)
9. (Japan) Ena Shibahara (qualified)
10. Oksana Selekhmeteva (first round)
11. (France) Séléna Janicijevic (first round)
12. (United States) Louisa Chirico (first round)

=== Qualifiers ===
1. (Spain) Cristina Bucșa
2. (Japan) Ena Shibahara
3. Tatiana Prozorova
4. Anastasia Zakharova
5. (Slovenia) Kaja Juvan
6. (China) Wei Sijia

=== Lucky loser ===
1. (Switzerland) Viktorija Golubic

=== Qualifying draw ===
==== First qualifier ====
First round
1	(Spain) Cristina Bucșa	6	6
(United States) Sophie Chang	1	3
WC	(United States) Jennifer Jackson	5	2
7	(Australia) Maddison Inglis	7	6

Qualifying competition
1	(Spain) Cristina Bucșa	6	6
7	(Australia) Maddison Inglis	3	0

==== Second qualifier ====
First round
2	(Switzerland) Viktorija Golubic	6	6
(Spain) Irene Burillo Escorihuela	2	0
(United States) Lauren Davis	6^{6}	4
9	(Japan) Ena Shibahara	7^{8}	6

Qualifying competition
2	(Switzerland) Viktorija Golubic	0	5
9	(Japan) Ena Shibahara	6	7

==== Third qualifier ====
First round
3	(Canada) Rebecca Marino	6	6
(United Kingdom) Heather Watson	3	4
Tatiana Prozorova	6	6
10	Oksana Selekhmeteva	4	1

Qualifying competition
3	(Canada) Rebecca Marino	4	0
Tatiana Prozorova	6	6

==== Fourth qualifier ====
First round
4	(Thailand) Mananchaya Sawangkaew	7^{7}	6
WC	(United States) Christina McHale	6^{5}	4
PR	(United Kingdom) Tara Moore	2	0
8	Anastasia Zakharova	6	6

Qualifying competition
4	(Thailand) Mananchaya Sawangkaew	6^{5}	2
8	Anastasia Zakharova	7^{7}	6

==== Fifth qualifier ====
First round
5	(Canada) Marina Stakusic	1^{r}
(United States) Victoria Hu	4
PR	(Slovenia) Kaja Juvan	7	3	6
12	(United States) Louisa Chirico	5	6	3

Qualifying competition
(United States) Victoria Hu	2	3
PR	(Slovenia) Kaja Juvan	6	6

==== Sixth qualifier ====
First round
6	(China) Wei Sijia	7	6
(United States) Makenna Jones	5	2
(United States) Hina Inoue	6	7
11	(France) Séléna Janicijevic	1	5

Qualifying competition
6	(China) Wei Sijia	6	6
(United States) Hina Inoue	4	2
