= 2025 ATX Open =

- Date: 24 February – 2 March
- Edition: 3rd
- Category: WTA 250
- Draw: 32S / 24Q / 16D
- Surface: Hard (Outdoor)
- Location: Austin, Texas, United States
- Venue: Westwood Country Club

Champions

Singles
- (United States) Jessica Pegula

Doubles
- Anna Blinkova / (China) Yuan Yue
- ATX Open

The 2025 ATX Open was a tournament for female professional tennis players played on outdoor hard courts. It was the third edition of the event, a WTA 250 tournament on the 2025 WTA Tour. The event took place at The Westwood Country Club in Austin, United States, from 24 February through 2 March 2025.

== Champions ==
=== Singles ===
- (United States) Jessica Pegula def. (United States) McCartney Kessler, 7–5, 6–2

=== Doubles ===
- Anna Blinkova / (China) Yuan Yue def. (United States) McCartney Kessler / (China) Zhang Shuai 3–6, 6–1, [10–4]

== Singles main draw entrants ==
=== Seeds ===
Country	Player	Rank^{1}	Seed
USA	Jessica Pegula	5	1
	Diana Shnaider	13	2
USA	Peyton Stearns	46	3
CHN	Yuan Yue	49	4
USA	McCartney Kessler	53	5
JPN	Moyuka Uchijima	62	6
USA	Katie Volynets	63	7
NED	Suzan Lamens	67	8

- Rankings as of 17 February 2025.

=== Other entrants ===
The following players received wildcards into the singles main draw:

- (Czech Republic) Petra Kvitová
- (United States) Malaika Rapolu
- Diana Shnaider
- (Australia) Ajla Tomljanović

The following players received entry using a protected ranking into the singles main draw:

- (United Kingdom) Jodie Burrage
- ~~(United States) Caty McNally~~

The following players received entry from the qualifying draw:

- (Spain) Cristina Bucșa
- (Slovenia) Kaja Juvan
- Tatiana Prozorova
- (Japan) Ena Shibahara
- (China) Wei Sijia
- Anastasia Zakharova

The following player received entry as a lucky loser:

- (Switzerland) Viktorija Golubic

=== Withdrawals ===
- (Italy) Lucia Bronzetti → replaced by (Netherlands) Arantxa Rus
- (United States) Ann Li → replaced by (Belgium) Greet Minnen
- (United States) Caty McNally → replaced by (Switzerland) Viktorija Golubic
- (United States) Taylor Townsend → replaced by (United Kingdom) Jodie Burrage
- (China) Wang Yafan → replaced by (Spain) Nuria Párrizas Díaz
- (China) Zhu Lin → replaced by (Australia) Kimberly Birrell

== Doubles main draw entrants ==
=== Seeds ===
Country	Player	Country	Player	Rank^{†}	Seed
ESP	Cristina Bucșa	JPN	Miyu Kato	58	1
USA	Caroline Dolehide	AUS	Storm Hunter	74	2
GEO	Oksana Kalashnikova		Kamilla Rakhimova	137	3
GBR	Maia Lumsden	GBR	Heather Watson	168	4

- ^{1} Rankings as of 17 February 2025.

=== Other entrants ===
The following pair received a wildcard into the doubles main draw:

- (United States) Elizabeth Mandlik / (United States) Caty McNally
