= 2024 ATX Open – Doubles =

Doubles
- 2024 ATX Open

Final
- Champions: (Australia) Olivia Gadecki (United Kingdom) Olivia Nicholls
- Runners-up: (Poland) Katarzyna Kawa (Netherlands) Bibiane Schoofs
- Score: 6–2, 6–4

Details
- Draw: 16
- Seeds: 4

Events
Singles	Doubles
← 2023 ·	ATX Open	· 2025 →

Olivia Gadecki and Olivia Nicholls defeated Katarzyna Kawa and Bibiane Schoofs in the final, 6–2, 6–4 to win the doubles tennis title at the 2024 ATX Open. It was Gadecki's first WTA Tour doubles title and Nicholls' second.

Erin Routliffe and Aldila Sutjiadi were the reigning champions, but chose not to compete this year.

== Seeds ==
1. (Georgia (country)) Oksana Kalashnikova / (Ukraine) Nadiia Kichenok (semifinals)
2. (Kazakhstan) Anna Danilina / (China) Zhang Shuai (quarterfinals)
3. Irina Khromacheva / Yana Sizikova (quarterfinals)
4. (Slovakia) Tereza Mihalíková / (Belgium) Yanina Wickmayer (semifinals, withdrew)

== Draw ==
=== Key ===
- Q = Qualifier
- WC = Wild card
- LL = Lucky loser
- Alt = Alternate
- SE = Special exempt
- PR = Protected ranking
- ITF = ITF entry
- JE = Junior exempt
- w/o = Walkover
- r = Retired
- d = Defaulted
- SR = Special ranking

=== Draw ===
First round
1	(Georgia (country)) O Kalashnikova (Ukraine) N Kichenok	7^{7}	7^{7}
(United States) S Chang (United States) A Kulikov	6^{4}	6^{5}
WC	(Australia) M Joint (Ukraine) S Zeynalova	6^{9}	6	[10]
(France) E Lechemia (Czech Republic) A Sisková	7^{11}	4	[4]
3	I Khromacheva; Y Sizikova	6	6
(United Kingdom) M Lumsden; I Shymanovich	0	1
(Poland) K Kawa (Netherlands) B Schoofs	5	6	[10]
PR	(United States) C Harrison (United States) S Santamaria	7	4	[6]
WC	(United Kingdom) S Murray Sharan (France) J Ponchet	6	3	[5]
(United States) P Stearns (United States) S Stephens	2	6	[10]
(China) Y Wang (China) Y Yuan	6	1	[7]
4	(Slovakia) T Mihalíková (Belgium) Y Wickmayer	4	6	[10]
(United States) D Collins (Mexico) F Contreras Gómez	4	3
(Australia) O Gadecki (United Kingdom) O Nicholls	6	6
(Italy) L Bronzetti (China) Xiy Wang	3	0
2	(Kazakhstan) A Danilina (China) S Zhang	6	6

Quarterfinals
1	(Georgia (country)) O Kalashnikova (Ukraine) N Kichenok	3	6	[11]
WC	(Australia) M Joint (Ukraine) S Zeynalova	6	3	[9]
3	I Khromacheva; Y Sizikova	6^{8}	0
(Poland) K Kawa (Netherlands) B Schoofs	7^{10}	6
(United States) P Stearns (United States) S Stephens	6	2	[2]
4	(Slovakia) T Mihalíková (Belgium) Y Wickmayer	4	6	[10]
(Australia) O Gadecki (United Kingdom) O Nicholls	6	6
2	(Kazakhstan) A Danilina (China) S Zhang	3	3

Semifinals
1	(Georgia (country)) O Kalashnikova (Ukraine) N Kichenok	7	4	[7]
(Poland) K Kawa (Netherlands) B Schoofs	5	6	[10]
4	(Slovakia) T Mihalíková (Belgium) Y Wickmayer
(Australia) O Gadecki (United Kingdom) O Nicholls	w/o

Final
(Poland) K Kawa (Netherlands) B Schoofs	2	4
(Australia) O Gadecki (United Kingdom) O Nicholls	6	6
