= 2023 ATX Open =

- Date: 27 February – 5 March
- Edition: 1st
- Category: WTA 250
- Draw: 32S / 24Q / 16D
- Prize money: $259,303
- Surface: Hard (Outdoor)
- Location: Austin, Texas, United States
- Venue: Westwood Country Club

Champions

Singles
- (Ukraine) Marta Kostyuk

Doubles
- (New Zealand) Erin Routliffe / (Indonesia) Aldila Sutjiadi
ATX Open	· 2024 →

The 2023 ATX Open was a WTA 250 tournament organised for female professional tennis players on outdoor hard courts as part of the 2023 WTA Tour. The event took place at The Westwood Country Club in Austin, United States, from 27 February through 5 March 2023.

== Champions ==
=== Singles ===
- (Ukraine) Marta Kostyuk def. Varvara Gracheva, 6–3, 7–5

=== Doubles ===
- (New Zealand) Erin Routliffe / (Indonesia) Aldila Sutjiadi def. (United States) Nicole Melichar-Martinez / (Australia) Ellen Perez, 6–4, 3–6, [10–8]

== Points and prize money ==
=== Point distribution ===
Event	W	F	SF	QF	Round of 16	Round of 32	Q	Q2	Q1
Singles	280	180	110	60	30	1	18	12	1
Doubles	280	180	110	60	1	—	—	—	—

=== Prize money ===
Event	W	F	SF	QF	Round of 16	Round of 32	Q2	Q1
Women's singles	$34,228	$20,226	$11,275	$6,418	$3,922	$2,804	$2,075	$1,340
Women's doubles	$12,447	$7,000	$4,020	$2,400	$1,848	—	—	—

== Singles main draw entrants ==
=== Seeds ===
Country	Player	Rank^{1}	Seed
POL	Magda Linette	21	1
~~CHN~~	~~Zhang Shuai~~	~~22~~	~~2~~
	Anastasia Potapova	29	3
USA	Danielle Collins	40	4
USA	Sloane Stephens	41	5
~~USA~~	~~Lauren Davis~~	~~49~~	~~6~~
USA	Alycia Parks	51	7
UKR	Marta Kostyuk	55	8

- Rankings are as of February 20, 2023.

=== Other entrants ===
The following players received wildcards into the singles main draw:

- (Sweden) Mirjam Björklund
- (United States) Elizabeth Mandlik
- (United States) Peyton Stearns

The following player received entry using a protected ranking into the singles main draw:

- (United States) Taylor Townsend

The following players received entry from the qualifying draw:

- (United Kingdom) Katie Boulter
- (United States) Louisa Chirico
- (United States) Ashlyn Krueger
- (United States) Ann Li
- (United States) Robin Montgomery
- (United Kingdom) Heather Watson

The following players received entry as lucky losers:

- Erika Andreeva
- (Japan) Nao Hibino
- (United States) CoCo Vandeweghe

=== Withdrawals ===
Before the tournament

- (United States) Lauren Davis → replaced by (Japan) Nao Hibino
- (Switzerland) Viktorija Golubic → replaced by (United Kingdom) Harriet Dart
- (Ukraine) Anhelina Kalinina → replaced by (Ukraine) Dayana Yastremska
- (Italy) Jasmine Paolini → replaced by (United States) Katie Volynets
- (United Kingdom) Emma Raducanu → replaced by (United States) CoCo Vandeweghe
- (Belgium) Alison Van Uytvanck → replaced by (Hungary) Dalma Gálfi
- (China) Zhang Shuai → replaced by Erika Andreeva

== Doubles main draw entrants ==
=== Seeds ===
Country	Player	Country	Player	Rank^{†}	Seed
USA	Nicole Melichar-Martinez	AUS	Ellen Perez	35	1
NZL	Erin Routliffe	INA	Aldila Sutjiadi	71	2
GER	Anna-Lena Friedsam	UKR	Nadiia Kichenok	168	3
GBR	Harriet Dart		Alexandra Panova	181	4

- ^{1} Rankings as of February 20, 2023.

=== Other entrants ===
The following pairs received wildcards into the doubles main draw:

- (United States) Charlotte Chavatipon / (Ukraine) Sabina Zeynalova
- (United States) Ashlyn Krueger / (United States) Robin Montgomery

=== Withdrawals ===
- (Japan) Miyu Kato / (Indonesia) Aldila Sutjiadi → replaced by (New Zealand) Erin Routliffe / (Indonesia) Aldila Sutjiadi
- Yana Sizikova / (Belgium) Alison Van Uytvanck → replaced by Anna Blinkova / Yana Sizikova
