= 2023 ATX Open – Singles =

Singles
- 2023 ATX Open

Final
- Champion: (Ukraine) Marta Kostyuk
- Runner-up: Varvara Gracheva
- Score: 6–3, 7–5

Details
- Draw: 32
- Seeds: 8

Events
Singles	Doubles
ATX Open	· 2024 →

This was the first edition of the tournament.

Marta Kostyuk defeated Varvara Gracheva in the final, 6–3, 7–5 to win the singles tennis title at the 2023 ATX Open. It was her first WTA Tour singles title.

== Seeds ==
1. (Poland) Magda Linette (first round)
2. (China) Zhang Shuai (withdrew)
3. Anastasia Potapova (second round)
4. (United States) Danielle Collins (semifinals)
5. (United States) Sloane Stephens (quarterfinals)
6. (United States) Lauren Davis (withdrew)
7. (United States) Alycia Parks (first round)
8. (Ukraine) Marta Kostyuk (champion)

== Draw ==
Key

- Q = Qualifier
- WC = Wild card
- LL = Lucky loser
- Alt = Alternate
- ITF = ITF entry
- PR = Protected ranking
- SR = Special ranking
- SE = Special exempt
- JE = Junior exempt
- JR = Junior Accelerator Programme entrant
- CO = College Accelerator Programme entrant
- NG = Next Gen Accelerator Program entrant
- w/o = Walkover
- r = Retired
- d = Defaulted

=== Finals ===
Semifinals
Varvara Gracheva	6	5	6
(United States) Katie Volynets	4	7	4
4	(United States) Danielle Collins	4	3
8	(Ukraine) Marta Kostyuk	6	6

Final
Varvara Gracheva	3	5
8	(Ukraine) Marta Kostyuk	6	7

=== Top half ===
First round
1	(Poland) M Linette	3	6	4
V Gracheva	6	4	6
A Blinkova	6	6
Q	(United States) A Li	4	4
(Montenegro) D Kovinić	6^{2}	4
Q	(United Kingdom) H Watson	7^{7}	6
PR	(United States) T Townsend	3	3
5	(United States) S Stephens	6	6
3	A Potapova	6	6
WC	(United States) E Mandlik	2	0
(United States) K Volynets	6	3	6
(United States) A Riske-Amritraj	3	6	0
WC	(United States) P Stearns	7^{7}	6^{2}	7^{7}
Q	(United Kingdom) K Boulter	6^{5}	7^{7}	6^{5}
WC	(Sweden) M Björklund	6	4	6
7	(United States) A Parks	4	6	4

Second round
V Gracheva	6	6^{5}	6
A Blinkova	3	7^{7}	1
Q	(United Kingdom) H Watson	4	4
5	(United States) S Stephens	6	6
3	A Potapova	7	2	5
(United States) K Volynets	5	6	7
WC	(United States) P Stearns	6	7
WC	(Sweden) M Björklund	3	5

Quarterfinals
V Gracheva	7^{7}	6
5	(United States) S Stephens	6^{4}	3
(United States) K Volynets	7	6
WC	(United States) P Stearns	5	3

Semifinals
V Gracheva	6	5	6
(United States) K Volynets	4	7	4

=== Bottom half ===
First round
LL	(Japan) N Hibino	4	6	2
A Kalinskaya	6	3	6
Q	(United States) R Montgomery	2	7^{7}	6^{3}
LL	(United States) C Vandeweghe	6	6^{3}	7^{7}
(United States) C McNally	6	6
Q	(United States) A Krueger	4	3
(Poland) M Fręch	7^{9}	2	4
4	(United States) D Collins	6^{7}	6	6
8	(Ukraine) M Kostyuk	7	6
(Hungary) D Gálfi	5	1
(United States) M Brengle	6	7^{7}
Q	(United States) L Chirico	2	6^{3}
(Ukraine) D Yastremska	4	4
(Germany) A-L Friedsam	6	6
(United Kingdom) H Dart	6^{4}	6	6^{3}
LL	E Andreeva	7^{7}	3	7^{7}

Second round
A Kalinskaya	6	6
LL	(United States) C Vandeweghe	3	1
(United States) C McNally	1	1
4	(United States) D Collins	6	6
8	(Ukraine) M Kostyuk	6	3	6
(United States) M Brengle	3	6	0
(Germany) A-L Friedsam	7	6^{2}	7^{10}
LL	E Andreeva	5	7^{7}	6^{8}

Quarterfinals
A Kalinskaya	6	2	1
4	(United States) D Collins	3	6	6
8	(Ukraine) M Kostyuk	7^{8}	6
(Germany) A-L Friedsam	6^{6}	2

Semifinals
4	(United States) D Collins	4	3
8	(Ukraine) M Kostyuk	6	6

== Qualifying ==
=== Seeds ===
1. (United Kingdom) Jodie Burrage (first round)
2. (United States) CoCo Vandeweghe (qualifying competition, lucky loser)
3. Erika Andreeva (qualifying competition, lucky loser)
4. (Japan) Nao Hibino (qualifying competition, lucky loser)
5. (United Kingdom) Katie Boulter (qualified)
6. (United Kingdom) Heather Watson (qualified)
7. (Argentina) María Lourdes Carlé (qualifying competition)
8. (United States) Ashlyn Krueger (qualified)
9. (United States) Ann Li (qualified)
10. (Canada) Carol Zhao (first round)
11. Elina Avanesyan (qualifying competition)
12. (United States) Louisa Chirico (qualified)

=== Qualifiers ===
1. (United States) Robin Montgomery
2. (United States) Louisa Chirico
3. (United States) Ashlyn Krueger
4. (United States) Ann Li
5. (United Kingdom) Katie Boulter
6. (United Kingdom) Heather Watson

=== Lucky loser ===
1. (United States) CoCo Vandeweghe
2. Erika Andreeva
3. (Japan) Nao Hibino

=== Qualifying draw ===
==== First qualifier ====
First round
1	(United Kingdom) Jodie Burrage	4	5
(United States) Robin Montgomery	6	7
(United States) Elvina Kalieva	7^{7}	6
10	(Canada) Carol Zhao	6^{3}	4

Qualifying competition
(United States) Robin Montgomery	7^{7}	6
(United States) Elvina Kalieva	6^{4}	1

==== Second qualifier ====
First round
2	(United States) CoCo Vandeweghe	6	6
(Germany) Lena Papadakis	4	1
WC	(Israel) Nicole Khirin	3	4
12	(United States) Louisa Chirico	6	6

Qualifying competition
2	(United States) CoCo Vandeweghe	6	3	6^{0}
12	(United States) Louisa Chirico	4	6	7^{7}

==== Third qualifier ====
First round
3	Erika Andreeva	2	6	7^{7}
(China) You Xiaodi	6	2	6^{1}
(Czech Republic) Sára Bejlek	0	3
8/WC	(United States) Ashlyn Krueger	6	6

Qualifying competition
3	Erika Andreeva	6	5	1
8/WC	(United States) Ashlyn Krueger	1	7	6

==== Fourth qualifier ====
First round
4	(Japan) Nao Hibino	6	6
WC	(United States) Liv Hovde	2	1
WC	(Australia) Ellen Perez	6^{4}	2
9	(United States) Ann Li	7^{7}	6

Qualifying competition
4	(Japan) Nao Hibino	1	6	4
9	(United States) Ann Li	6	3	6

==== Fifth qualifier ====
First round
5	(United Kingdom) Katie Boulter	7	6
(United States) Hailey Baptiste	5	0
(United States) Kayla Day	6^{3}	4
11	Elina Avanesyan	7^{7}	6

Qualifying competition
5	(United Kingdom) Katie Boulter	2	7	2
11	Elina Avanesyan	6	5	0^{r}

==== Sixth qualifier ====
First round
6	(United Kingdom) Heather Watson	6	4	6
(United States) Jamie Loeb	3	6	4
(Romania) Gabriela Lee	3	1
7	(Argentina) María Lourdes Carlé	6	6

Qualifying competition
6	(United Kingdom) Heather Watson	6	7
7	(Argentina) María Lourdes Carlé	4	5
