= 2024 National Bank Open – Women's singles =

Women's singles
- 2024 National Bank Open

Final
- Champion: (United States) Jessica Pegula
- Runner-up: (United States) Amanda Anisimova
- Score: 6–3, 2–6, 6–1

Details
- Draw: 56
- Seeds: 16

Events
Singles	men	women
Doubles	men	women
← 2023 ·	Canadian Open	· 2025 →

Defending champion Jessica Pegula defeated Amanda Anisimova in the final, 6–3, 2–6, 6–1 to win the women's singles tennis title at the 2024 Canadian Open. It was her third WTA 1000 title and sixth career WTA Tour title. Pegula was the first player to defend the title since Martina Hingis in 2000. Ranked No. 132, Anisimova was the lowest-ranked finalist at the event since Alycia Moulton in 1984.

This marked the second WTA 1000 tournament to have five quarterfinalists from the same country (the United States), the second such instance since the WTA 1000 format was first introduced in 2009 (after the 2009 China Open), and the most American quarterfinalists at the same WTA Tour event since 2001.

== Seeds ==
The top eight seeds received a bye into the second round.

1. (United States) Coco Gauff (third round)
2. Aryna Sabalenka (quarterfinals)
3. (United States) Jessica Pegula (champion)
4. (Latvia) Jeļena Ostapenko (third round)
5. Daria Kasatkina (second round)
6. Liudmila Samsonova (quarterfinals)
7. (United States) Madison Keys (second round, retired)
8. (United States) Emma Navarro (semifinals)

9. (Tunisia) Ons Jabeur (first round)
10. Anna Kalinskaya (third round, retired)
11. (Ukraine) Marta Kostyuk (third round)
12. Victoria Azarenka (third round, retired)
13. (Brazil) Beatriz Haddad Maia (second round, retired)
14. Diana Shnaider (semifinals)
15. (Canada) Leylah Fernandez (second round)
16. (Ukraine) Dayana Yastremska (first round, retired)

Click on the seed number of a player to go to their draw section.

== Draw ==
=== Key ===
- Q = Qualifier
- WC = Wild card
- LL = Lucky loser
- Alt = Alternate
- ITF = ITF entry
- PR = Protected ranking
- SR = Special ranking
- SE = Special exempt
- JE = Junior exempt
- JR = Junior Accelerator Programme entrant
- CO = College Accelerator Programme entrant
- NG = Next Gen Accelerator Program entrant
- w/o = Walkover
- r = Retired
- d = Defaulted

=== Finals ===
Quarterfinals
14	Diana Shnaider	4	6	6
6	Liudmila Samsonova	6	1	4
3	(United States) Jessica Pegula	6	7
(United States) Peyton Stearns	4	5
8	(United States) Emma Navarro	6	7^{7}
LL	(United States) Taylor Townsend	3	6^{5}
PR	(United States) Amanda Anisimova	6	6
2	Aryna Sabalenka	4	2

Semifinals
14	Diana Shnaider	4	3
3	(United States) Jessica Pegula	6	6
8	(United States) Emma Navarro	3	6	2
PR	(United States) Amanda Anisimova	6	2	6

Final
3	(United States) Jessica Pegula	6	2	6
PR	(United States) Amanda Anisimova	3	6	1

=== Top half ===
==== Section 1 ====
First round
Q	(China) Y Wang	7	7^{7}
(United States) S Kenin	5	6^{3}
A Potapova	6	3	0
(Poland) M Fręch	4	6	6
LL	(United Kingdom) H Dart	3	6	6^{2}
14	D Shnaider	6	3	7^{7}
9	(Tunisia) O Jabeur	3	1
WC	(Japan) N Osaka	6	6
(Belgium) E Mertens	6	6
Q	(United States) K Volynets	3	1
Q	(Japan) M Uchijima	7^{7}	6
(Bulgaria) V Tomova	6^{4}	2

Second round
1	(United States) C Gauff	6	6
Q	(China) Y Wang	4	4
(Poland) M Fręch	6	3	6^{5}
14	D Shnaider	2	6	7^{7}
WC	(Japan) N Osaka	3	4
(Belgium) E Mertens	6	6
Q	(Japan) M Uchijima	4	2
6	L Samsonova	6	6

Third round
1	(United States) C Gauff	4	1
14	D Shnaider	6	6
(Belgium) E Mertens	2	4
6	L Samsonova	6	6

Quarterfinals
14	D Shnaider	4	6	6
6	L Samsonova	6	1	4

==== Section 2 ====
First round
(Argentina) N Podoroska	4	6^{10}
(Czech Republic) Ka Plíšková	6	7^{12}
Q	(United States) A Krueger	6	6
(Italy) E Cocciaretto	3	2
LL	(Japan) N Hibino	3	7	1
15	(Canada) L Fernandez	6	5	6
12	V Azarenka	6	6
A Pavlyuchenkova	2	2
Q	(Belgium) G Minnen	6	6
(United States) S Stephens	2	2
A Blinkova	4	3
(United States) P Stearns	6	6

Second round
3	(United States) J Pegula	7	6
(Czech Republic) Ka Plíšková	5	4
Q	(United States) A Krueger	6	6
15	(Canada) L Fernandez	4	2
12	V Azarenka	3	7	6
Q	(Belgium) G Minnen	6	5	1
(United States) P Stearns	3	7	3
7	(United States) M Keys	6	5	0^{r}

Third round
3	(United States) J Pegula	6	6
Q	(United States) A Krueger	2	4
12	V Azarenka	4	2^{r}
(United States) P Stearns	6	4

Quarterfinals
3	(United States) J Pegula	6	7
(United States) P Stearns	4	5

=== Bottom half ===
==== Section 3 ====
First round
(Poland) M Linette	6	6
WC	(Canada) R Marino	3	4
PR	(United States) S Rogers	0	2
(Ukraine) E Svitolina	6	6
(Germany) T Maria	0	2
11	(Ukraine) M Kostyuk	6	6
16	(Ukraine) D Yastremska	3	1^{r}
LL	(United States) T Townsend	6	3
Q	E Andreeva	7^{7}	1	4
WC	(Canada) M Stakusic	6^{5}	6	6
PR	(Spain) P Badosa	6	6
(Denmark) C Tauson	1	4

Second round
8	(United States) E Navarro	6	6
(Poland) M Linette	2	4
(Ukraine) E Svitolina	2	6	2
11	(Ukraine) M Kostyuk	6	2	6
LL	(United States) T Townsend	6	6
WC	(Canada) M Stakusic	0	2
PR	(Spain) P Badosa	6	6^{3}	2
4	(Latvia) J Ostapenko	3	7^{7}	6

Third round
8	(United States) E Navarro	7	7
11	(Ukraine) M Kostyuk	5	5
LL	(United States) T Townsend	6	6
4	(Latvia) J Ostapenko	2	1

Quarterfinals
8	(United States) E Navarro	6	7^{7}
LL	(United States) T Townsend	3	6^{5}

==== Section 4 ====
First round
(United States) C Dolehide	1	4
PR	(United States) A Anisimova	6	6
WC	(Canada) B Andreescu	6	3	4
(Ukraine) L Tsurenko	0	6	6
Q	(United States) L Chirico	2	3
10	A Kalinskaya	6	6
13	(Brazil) B Haddad Maia	5	6	7^{7}
(Czech Republic) M Bouzková	7	2	6^{1}
Q	(United States) B Pera	4	6	1
(United Kingdom) K Boulter	6	3	6
(Spain) C Bucșa	3	3
(China) Y Yuan	6	6

Second round
5	D Kasatkina	4	3
PR	(United States) A Anisimova	6	6
(Ukraine) L Tsurenko	2	2
10	A Kalinskaya	6	6
13	(Brazil) B Haddad Maia	1^{r}
(United Kingdom) K Boulter	1
(China) Y Yuan	2	2
2	A Sabalenka	6	6

Third round
PR	(United States) A Anisimova	6	0
10	A Kalinskaya	2	0^{r}
(United Kingdom) K Boulter	3	3
2	A Sabalenka	6	6

Quarterfinals
PR	(United States) A Anisimova	6	6
2	A Sabalenka	4	2

== Seeded players ==
The following are the seeded players. Seedings are based on WTA rankings as of 29 July 2024. Rankings and points before are as of 5 August 2024.

Under the 2024 WTA Rulebook, points from all combined ATP/WTA 1000 tournaments (which include the Canadian Open) are required to be counted in a player's ranking.

Seed	Rank	Player	Points before	Points defending	Points earned	Points after	Status
1	2	(United States) Coco Gauff	7,703	190	120	7,633	Third round lost to Diana Shnaider [14]
2	3	Aryna Sabalenka	7,256	105	215	7,366	Quarterfinals lost to (United States) Amanda Anisimova [PR]
3	6	(United States) Jessica Pegula	4,515	900	1,000	4,615	Champion, defeated (United States) Amanda Anisimova [PR]
4	11	(Latvia) Jeļena Ostapenko	3,418	(60)^{†}	120	3,478	Third round lost to (United States) Taylor Townsend [LL]
5	12	Daria Kasatkina	3,283	190	10	3,103	Second round lost to (United States) Amanda Anisimova [PR]
6	13	Liudmila Samsonova	2,820	585	215	2,450	Quarterfinals lost to Diana Shnaider [14]
7	14	(United States) Madison Keys	2,778	60	10	2,728	Second round retired against (United States) Peyton Stearns
8	15	(United States) Emma Navarro	2,729	(81)^{‡}	390	3,038	Semifinals lost to (United States) Amanda Anisimova [PR]
9	16	(Tunisia) Ons Jabeur	2,631	0	10	2,641	First round lost to (Japan) Naomi Osaka [WC]
10	17	Anna Kalinskaya	2,550	(10)^{‡}	120	2,660	Third round retired against (United States) Amanda Anisimova [PR]
11	20	(Ukraine) Marta Kostyuk	2,141	1	120	2,260	Third round lost to (United States) Emma Navarro [8]
12	19	Victoria Azarenka	2,266	60	120	2,326	Third round retired against (United States) Peyton Stearns
13	22	(Brazil) Beatriz Haddad Maia	2,108	60	65	2,113	Second round retired against (United Kingdom) Katie Boulter
14	24	Diana Shnaider	1,930	(25)^{‡}	390	2,295	Semifinals lost to (United States) Jessica Pegula [3]
15	25	(Canada) Leylah Fernandez	1,894	105	65	1,854	Second round lost to (United States) Ashlyn Krueger [Q]
16	27	(Ukraine) Dayana Yastremska	1,823	(160)^{§}	10	1,673	First round retired against (United States) Taylor Townsend [LL]

† The player's 2023 points did not count towards her ranking on 5 August 2024 because the 2023 tournament was non-mandatory. Points from her 18th best result will be deducted instead.
‡ The player did not qualify for the tournament in 2023. Points from her 18th best result will be deducted instead.
§ The player did not qualify for the tournament in 2023. She is defending points from a WTA 125 tournament instead.

=== Withdrawn players ===
The following players would have been seeded, but withdrew before the tournament began.

Rank	Player	Points before	Points defending	Points after	Withdrawal reason
1	(Poland) Iga Świątek	11,005	350	10,655	Fatigue
4	(Kazakhstan) Elena Rybakina	6,376	350	6,026	Acute bronchitis
5	(Italy) Jasmine Paolini	5,373	105	5,268	Fatigue
7	(China) Zheng Qinwen	4,025	60	3,965	Fatigue
8	(United States) Danielle Collins	3,702	220	3,482	Abdominal injury
9	(Greece) Maria Sakkari	3,621	1	3,620	Shoulder injury
10	(Czech Republic) Barbora Krejčiková	3,573	(1)^{†}	3,572	Thigh injury

† The player did not play in 2023, when the tournament was non-mandatory. Points from her 18th best result will be deducted instead.

== Other entry information ==
=== Wildcards ===
- (Canada) Bianca Andreescu
- (Canada) Rebecca Marino
- (Japan) Naomi Osaka
- (Canada) Marina Stakusic

=== Protected ranking ===
- (United States) Amanda Anisimova
- (Spain) Paula Badosa
- (United States) Shelby Rogers
- ~~(China) Zhang Shuai~~

=== Withdrawals ===
- ‡ Ekaterina Alexandrova → replaced by (Spain) Cristina Bucșa
- ‡ (Romania) Sorana Cîrstea → replaced by (Czech Republic) Karolína Plíšková
- ‡ (United States) Danielle Collins → replaced by (United States) Caroline Dolehide
- ‡ (France) Caroline Garcia → replaced by (United States) Shelby Rogers
- ‡ (Czech Republic) Barbora Krejčiková → replaced by (China) Zhang Shuai
- ‡ Veronika Kudermetova → replaced by (Bulgaria) Viktoriya Tomova
- ‡ (Czech Republic) Karolína Muchová → replaced by (Denmark) Clara Tauson
- ‡ (Czech Republic) Linda Nosková → replaced by (Argentina) Nadia Podoroska
- ‡ (Italy) Jasmine Paolini → replaced by (United States) Peyton Stearns
- § (Kazakhstan) Yulia Putintseva → replaced by (United States) Taylor Townsend
- ‡ (Kazakhstan) Elena Rybakina → replaced by (United States) Sofia Kenin
- ‡ (Greece) Maria Sakkari → replaced by (United States) Sloane Stephens
- ‡ (Czech Republic) Kateřina Siniaková → replaced by (United States) Amanda Anisimova
- ‡ (Poland) Iga Świątek → replaced by (Poland) Magdalena Fręch
- ‡ (Croatia) Donna Vekić → replaced by (Ukraine) Lesia Tsurenko
- ‡ (Czech Republic) Markéta Vondroušová → replaced by Anna Blinkova
- § (China) Wang Xinyu → replaced by (United Kingdom) Harriet Dart
- § (China) Zhang Shuai → replaced by (Japan) Nao Hibino
- ‡ (China) Zheng Qinwen → replaced by (Germany) Tatjana Maria

‡ – withdrew from entry list
§ – withdrew from main draw

== Qualifying ==
=== Seeds ===
1. (United States) Katie Volynets (qualified)
2. (Japan) Moyuka Uchijima (qualified)
3. (Belgium) Greet Minnen (qualified)
4. (China) Wang Yafan (qualified)
5. (United Kingdom) Harriet Dart (qualifying competition, retired, lucky loser)
6. (United States) Taylor Townsend (qualifying competition, lucky loser)
7. (United States) Bernarda Pera (qualified)
8. (United States) Ashlyn Krueger (qualified)
9. Erika Andreeva (qualified)
10. (Japan) Nao Hibino (qualifying competition, lucky loser)
11. (United States) Hailey Baptiste (withdrew)
12. (France) Chloé Paquet (qualifying competition)
13. (Germany) Jule Niemeier (first round)
14. (United States) Alycia Parks (first round)
15. (Australia) Arina Rodionova (first round)
16. (Spain) Rebeka Masarova (first round)

=== Qualifiers ===
1. (United States) Katie Volynets
2. (Japan) Moyuka Uchijima
3. (Belgium) Greet Minnen
4. (China) Wang Yafan
5. (United States) Louisa Chirico
6. Erika Andreeva
7. (United States) Bernarda Pera
8. (United States) Ashlyn Krueger

=== Lucky losers ===
1. (United Kingdom) Harriet Dart
2. (United States) Taylor Townsend
3. (Japan) Nao Hibino

=== Draw ===
==== First qualifier ====
First round
1	(United States) Katie Volynets	0	6	7
(United Kingdom) Lily Miyazaki	6	3	5
WC	(Canada) Stacey Fung	6	5	6
13	(Germany) Jule Niemeier	4	7	4

Qualifying competition
1	(United States) Katie Volynets	6	6
WC	(Canada) Stacey Fung	1	3

==== Second qualifier ====
First round
2	(Japan) Moyuka Uchijima	5	7	6
WC	(Canada) Eugenie Bouchard	7	5	4
(United States) Kayla Day	3	7	7
16	(Spain) Rebeka Masarova	6	5	5

Qualifying competition
2	(Japan) Moyuka Uchijima	4	7^{7}	6
(United States) Kayla Day	6	6^{5}	2

==== Third qualifier ====
First round
3	(Belgium) Greet Minnen	6	4	6
Alt	(Hungary) Tímea Babos	1	6	4
(Australia) Destanee Aiava	6	6
14	(United States) Alycia Parks	4	3

Qualifying competition
3	(Belgium) Greet Minnen	4	6	6
(Australia) Destanee Aiava	6	4	2

==== Fourth qualifier ====
First round
4	(China) Wang Yafan	7	6
PR	(Sweden) Mirjam Björklund	5	4
(Australia) Kimberly Birrell	3	3
12	(France) Chloé Paquet	6	6

Qualifying competition
4	(China) Wang Yafan	6	7
12	(France) Chloé Paquet	3	5

==== Fifth qualifier ====
First round
5	(United Kingdom) Harriet Dart	6	6
(United States) Robin Montgomery	3	4
(United States) Louisa Chirico	7	6
15	(Australia) Arina Rodionova	5	2

Qualifying competition
5	(United Kingdom) Harriet Dart	6	6^{r}
(United States) Louisa Chirico	4	6

==== Sixth qualifier ====
First round
6	(United States) Taylor Townsend	6	6
(United States) Emina Bektas	2	2
WC	(Canada) Carson Branstine	6^{3}	2
9	Erika Andreeva	7^{7}	6

Qualifying competition
6	(United States) Taylor Townsend	6^{6}	4
9	Erika Andreeva	7^{8}	6

==== Seventh qualifier ====
First round
7	(United States) Bernarda Pera	1	6	6
(Romania) Miriam Bulgaru	6	2	1
WC	(Canada) Katherine Sebov	2	6	1
10	(Japan) Nao Hibino	6	2	6

Qualifying competition
7	(United States) Bernarda Pera	2	6	7^{7}
10	(Japan) Nao Hibino	6	4	6^{3}

==== Eighth qualifier ====
First round
8	(United States) Ashlyn Krueger	4	7^{7}	6
(Australia) Priscilla Hon	6	6^{5}	1
(France) Kristina Mladenovic	5	1
Alt	(Canada) Carol Zhao	7	6

Qualifying competition
8	(United States) Ashlyn Krueger	6	6
Alt	(Canada) Carol Zhao	1	0
