= 2025 Dubai Tennis Championships – Women's singles =

Women's singles
- 2025 Dubai Tennis Championships

Final
- Champion: Mirra Andreeva
- Runner-up: (Denmark) Clara Tauson
- Score: 7–6^{(7–1)}, 6–1

Details
- Draw: 56 (8Q / 4WC)
- Seeds: 16

Events
Singles	men	women
Doubles	men	women
- Dubai Tennis Championships

Mirra Andreeva defeated Clara Tauson in the final, 7–6^{(7–1)}, 6–1 to win the women's singles title at the 2025 Dubai Tennis Championships. It was her second WTA Tour singles title. At 17 years and 299 days old, Andreeva became the youngest WTA 1000 champion and finalist since the category's inception in 2009. She was the youngest player to record wins over multiple major champions in a 1000-level event, and the youngest to defeat three major winners at the same tournament since Maria Sharapova at the 2004 WTA Finals. By winning the title, Andreeva made her debut in the top 10 of the WTA rankings, the first 17-year-old to be ranked in the top 10 in singles since Nicole Vaidišová in 2007.

Jasmine Paolini was the defending champion, but lost in the third round to Sofia Kenin.

== Seeds ==
The top eight seeds received a bye into the second round.

1. Aryna Sabalenka (third round)
2. (Poland) Iga Świątek (quarterfinals)
3. (United States) Coco Gauff (second round)
4. (Italy) Jasmine Paolini (third round)
5. (United States) Jessica Pegula (third round)
6. (Kazakhstan) Elena Rybakina (semifinals)
7. (China) Zheng Qinwen (second round)
8. (United States) Emma Navarro (third round)

9. (Spain) Paula Badosa (third round)
10. Daria Kasatkina (first round)
11. Diana Shnaider (second round)
12. Mirra Andreeva (champion)
13. (Brazil) Beatriz Haddad Maia (first round)
14. (Czech Republic) Karolína Muchová (semifinals)
15. Anna Kalinskaya (first round)
16. (Croatia) Donna Vekić (first round)

Click on the seed number of a player to go to their draw section.

== Draw ==
Key

- Q = Qualifier
- WC = Wild card
- LL = Lucky loser
- Alt = Alternate
- ITF = ITF entry
- PR = Protected ranking
- SR = Special ranking
- SE = Special exempt
- JE = Junior exempt
- JR = Junior Accelerator Programme entrant
- CO = College Accelerator Programme entrant
- NG = Next Gen Accelerator Program entrant
- w/o = Walkover
- r = Retired
- d = Defaulted

=== Finals ===
Quarterfinals
(Denmark) Clara Tauson	7^{7}	6
(Czech Republic) Linda Nosková	6^{4}	4
14	(Czech Republic) Karolína Muchová	6	7
WC	(Romania) Sorana Cîrstea	2	5
6	(Kazakhstan) Elena Rybakina	6	7^{7}
WC	(United States) Sofia Kenin	2	6^{2}
12	Mirra Andreeva	6	6
2	(Poland) Iga Świątek	3	3

Semifinals
(Denmark) Clara Tauson	6	6^{4}	6
14	(Czech Republic) Karolína Muchová	4	7^{7}	3
6	(Kazakhstan) Elena Rybakina	4	6	3
12	Mirra Andreeva	6	4	6

Final
(Denmark) Clara Tauson	6^{1}	1
12	Mirra Andreeva	7^{7}	6

=== Top half ===
==== Section 1 ====
First round
E Alexandrova	6	4	3
Q	V Kudermetova	3	6	6
(Slovakia) R Šramková	6^{7}	0
(Denmark) C Tauson	7^{9}	6
(Ukraine) E Svitolina	6	6
15	A Kalinskaya	1	2
11	D Shnaider	6	6
(Poland) M Fręch	2	2
(Czech Republic) L Nosková	6	7^{7}
(Kazakhstan) Y Putintseva	2	6^{5}
L Samsonova	6	6
A Pavlyuchenkova	2	2

Second round
1	A Sabalenka	6	6
Q	V Kudermetova	3	4
(Denmark) C Tauson	7^{7}	3	7^{7}
(Ukraine) E Svitolina	6^{5}	6	6^{4}
11	D Shnaider	6^{8}	6	3
(Czech Republic) L Nosková	7^{10}	4	6
L Samsonova	0	4
5	(United States) J Pegula	6	6

Third round
1	A Sabalenka	3	2
(Denmark) C Tauson	6	6
(Czech Republic) L Nosková	6	7^{10}
5	(United States) J Pegula	3	6^{8}

Quarterfinals
(Denmark) C Tauson	7^{7}	6
(Czech Republic) L Nosková	6^{4}	4

==== Section 2 ====
First round
(United States) M Kessler	6	6
(United States) A Anisimova	2	3
(Greece) M Sakkari	4	2
WC	(United Kingdom) E Raducanu	6	6
Q	(Netherlands) S Lamens	2	2
14	(Czech Republic) K Muchová	6	6
10	D Kasatkina	1	4
WC	(Romania) S Cîrstea	6	6
Q	(United States) A Parks	6	6
(China) Xin Wang	3	3
PR	(Switzerland) B Bencic	6	6
Q	(Japan) A Ito	0	2

Second round
3	(United States) C Gauff	4	5
(United States) M Kessler	6	7
WC	(United Kingdom) E Raducanu	6^{6}	4
14	(Czech Republic) K Muchová	7^{8}	6
WC	(Romania) S Cîrstea	3	6	6
Q	(United States) A Parks	6	4	1
PR	(Switzerland) B Bencic	6^{6}	6	3
8	(United States) E Navarro	7^{8}	2	6

Third round
(United States) M Kessler	3	6	6^{5}
14	(Czech Republic) K Muchová	6	1	7^{7}
WC	(Romania) S Cîrstea	7^{7}	3	7
8	(United States) E Navarro	6^{5}	6	5

Quarterfinals
14	(Czech Republic) K Muchová	6	7
WC	(Romania) S Cîrstea	2	5

=== Bottom half ===
==== Section 3 ====
First round
Q	(Japan) M Uchijima	6	6
(Latvia) J Ostapenko	3	3
(Belgium) E Mertens	6	6
(Canada) L Fernandez	2	2
(New Zealand) L Sun	3	4
9	(Spain) P Badosa	6	6
16	(Croatia) D Vekić	5	3
WC	(United States) S Kenin	7	6
Q	(Czech Republic) K Siniaková	3	4
(Ukraine) M Kostyuk	6	6
Q	(Germany) E Lys	5	7	6
Q	(Romania) I-C Begu	7	5	3

Second round
6	(Kazakhstan) E Rybakina	6	6
Q	(Japan) M Uchijima	3	2
(Belgium) E Mertens	2	1
9	(Spain) P Badosa	6	6
WC	(United States) S Kenin	5	7^{9}	7^{7}
(Ukraine) M Kostyuk	7	6^{7}	6^{5}
Q	(Germany) E Lys	2	5
4	(Italy) J Paolini	6	7

Third round
6	(Kazakhstan) E Rybakina	4	7^{10}	7^{7}
9	(Spain) P Badosa	6	6^{8}	6^{2}
WC	(United States) S Kenin	6	6
4	(Italy) J Paolini	4	0

Quarterfinals
6	(Kazakhstan) E Rybakina	6	7^{7}
WC	(United States) S Kenin	2	6^{2}

==== Section 4 ====
First round
(Tunisia) O Jabeur	6^{6}	4
(United States) P Stearns	7^{8}	6
(Czech Republic) M Vondroušová	6	6
WC	(France) C Garcia	2	2
(Armenia) E Avanesyan	2	1
12	M Andreeva	6	6
13	(Brazil) B Haddad Maia	3	0
A Potapova	6	6
(Poland) M Linette	3	5
(Ukraine) D Yastremska	6	7
V Azarenka	2	7^{7}	6
(Ukraine) A Kalinina	6	6^{4}	4

Second round
7	(China) Q Zheng	6	4	4
(United States) P Stearns	3	6	6
(Czech Republic) M Vondroušová	5	0
12	M Andreeva	7	6
A Potapova	2	3
(Ukraine) D Yastremska	6	6
V Azarenka	0	2
2	(Poland) I Świątek	6	6

Third round
(United States) P Stearns	1	1
12	M Andreeva	6	6
(Ukraine) D Yastremska	5	0
2	(Poland) I Świątek	7	6

Quarterfinals
12	M Andreeva	6	6
2	(Poland) I Świątek	3	3

== Seeded players ==
The following are the seeded players. Seedings are based on WTA rankings as of 10 February 2025. Rankings and points before are as of 17 February 2025.

Under the 2025 Rulebook, points from one of the three non-combined WTA 1000 tournaments (which include Dubai) are required to be counted in a player's ranking.

The points dropping column reflects (a) the points from the 2024 tournament or (b) the player's best 18th result. The points won column reflects (a) the points of the 2025 tournament or (b) the player's 18th best result.

Seed	Rank	Player	Points before	Points dropping	Points won	Points after	Status
1	1	Aryna Sabalenka	8,966	10	120	9,076	Third round lost to (Denmark) Clara Tauson
2	2	(Poland) Iga Świątek	8,160	390	215	7,985	Quarterfinals lost to Mirra Andreeva [12]
3	3	(United States) Coco Gauff	6,538	215	10	6,333	Second round lost to (United States) McCartney Kessler
4	4	(Italy) Jasmine Paolini	5,398	1,000	120	4,518	Third round lost to (United States) Sofia Kenin [WC]
5	5	(United States) Jessica Pegula	5,076	0	120	5,196	Third round lost to (Czech Republic) Linda Nosková
6	7	(Kazakhstan) Elena Rybakina	4,153	215	390	4,328	Semifinals lost to Mirra Andreeva [12]
7	8	(China) Zheng Qinwen	3,985	215	10	3,780	Second round lost to (United States) Peyton Stearns
8	9	(United States) Emma Navarro	3,649	65	120	3,704	Third round lost to (Romania) Sorana Cîrstea [WC]
9	10	(Spain) Paula Badosa	3,588	10	120	3,698	Third round lost to (Kazakhstan) Elena Rybakina [6]
10	11	Daria Kasatkina	3,116	(108)^{†}	(108)^{‡}	3,116	First round lost to (Romania) Sorana Cîrstea [WC]
11	13	Diana Shnaider	2,853	(10)^{†}	65	2,908	Second round lost to (Czech Republic) Linda Nosková
12	14	Mirra Andreeva	2,730	10	1,000	3,720	Champion, defeated (Denmark) Clara Tauson
13	16	(Brazil) Beatriz Haddad Maia	2,369	10	10	2,369	First round lost to Anastasia Potapova
14	17	(Czech Republic) Karolína Muchová	2,344	0	390	2,734	Semifinals lost to (Denmark) Clara Tauson
15	19	Anna Kalinskaya	2,304	680	10	1,634	First round lost to (Ukraine) Elina Svitolina
16	20	(Croatia) Donna Vekić	2,273	120	10	2,163	First round lost to (United States) Sofia Kenin [WC]

† The player is defending points from her 18th best result.
‡ The player is keeping her 18th best result as it is higher than the Dubai result, which does not need to be counted in her rankings.

=== Withdrawn seeded players ===
The following players would have been seeded, but withdrew before the tournament began.

Rank	Player	Points before	Points dropping	Points added	Points after	Withdrawal reason
6	(United States) Madison Keys	4,680	(1)^{†}	0	4,679	Leg injury
12	(United States) Danielle Collins	2,877	(0)^{‡}	0	2,877	Foot injury
15	(Czech Republic) Barbora Krejčíková	2,675	(0)^{†}	0	2,675	Back injury

† The player missed the 2024 tournament but was not required to carry a 0-point penalty in her ranking due to a long-term injury exemption. Points from her 18th best result will be deducted instead.
‡ The player did not qualify for the 2024 tournament. Points from her 18th best result will be deducted instead.

== Other entry information ==
=== Wild cards ===
- (Romania) Sorana Cîrstea
- (France) Caroline Garcia
- (United States) Sofia Kenin
- (United Kingdom) Emma Raducanu

=== Protected ranking ===
- (Switzerland) Belinda Bencic

=== Withdrawals ===
- † (United Kingdom) Katie Boulter → replaced by (United States) McCartney Kessler
- § (Romania) Sorana Cîrstea → replaced by (Ukraine) Anhelina Kalinina
- † (United States) Danielle Collins → replaced by (Denmark) Clara Tauson
- † (United States) Madison Keys → replaced by (New Zealand) Lulu Sun
- † (Czech Republic) Barbora Krejčíková → replaced by (United States) Peyton Stearns

† – withdrew from entry list
§ – withdrew from entry list using protected ranking and received wild card

== Qualifying ==
=== Seeds ===
1. (United States) Ashlyn Krueger (qualifying competition)
2. (China) Yuan Yue (qualifying competition)
3. Veronika Kudermetova (qualified)
4. (Czech Republic) Kateřina Siniaková (qualified)
5. (Italy) Lucia Bronzetti (first round)
6. Polina Kudermetova (first round)
7. (United States) Ann Li (first round, retired)
8. (Bulgaria) Viktoriya Tomova (first round, retired)
9. (Japan) Moyuka Uchijima (qualified)
10. (Netherlands) Suzan Lamens (qualified)
11. (Mexico) Renata Zarazúa (first round, retired)
12. Kamilla Rakhimova (qualifying competition)
13. (United States) Bernarda Pera (qualifying competition)
14. (Romania) Irina-Camelia Begu (qualified)
15. (United States) Taylor Townsend (first round)
16. (Romania) Jaqueline Cristian (qualifying competition)

=== Qualifiers ===
1. (Japan) Aoi Ito
2. (Romania) Irina-Camelia Begu
3. Veronika Kudermetova
4. (Czech Republic) Kateřina Siniaková
5. (Netherlands) Suzan Lamens
6. (United States) Alycia Parks
7. (Germany) Eva Lys
8. (Japan) Moyuka Uchijima

=== Draw ===
==== First qualifier ====
First round
1	(United States) Ashlyn Krueger	6	7
(Germany) Jule Niemeier	4	5
(Japan) Aoi Ito	6	6
15	(United States) Taylor Townsend	3	4

Qualifying competition
1	(United States) Ashlyn Krueger	5	2
(Japan) Aoi Ito	7	6

==== Second qualifier ====
First round
2	(China) Yuan Yue	6	6
(Spain) Cristina Bucșa	3	1
WC	(Syria) Leah Baroudi	1	1
14	(Romania) Irina-Camelia Begu	6	6

Qualifying competition
2	(China) Yuan Yue	5	4
14	(Romania) Irina-Camelia Begu	7	6

==== Third qualifier ====
First round
3	Veronika Kudermetova	7^{7}	6
(France) Chloé Paquet	6^{4}	4
WC	(Republic of Ireland) Celine Simunyu	6	3
11	(Mexico) Renata Zarazúa	4	0^{r}

Qualifying competition
3	Veronika Kudermetova	6	7
WC	(Republic of Ireland) Celine Simunyu	2	5

==== Fourth qualifier ====
First round
4	(Czech Republic) Kateřina Siniaková	6	6
WC	(France) Kristina Mladenovic	4	0
(Romania) Elena-Gabriela Ruse	6	2	1
16	(Romania) Jaqueline Cristian	2	6	6

Qualifying competition
4	(Czech Republic) Kateřina Siniaková	6	6
16	(Romania) Jaqueline Cristian	3	2

==== Fifth qualifier ====
First round
5	(Italy) Lucia Bronzetti	1	2
WC	(China) Zhang Shuai	6	6
(Australia) Daria Saville	3	6	3
10	(Netherlands) Suzan Lamens	6	3	6

Qualifying competition
WC	(China) Zhang Shuai	2	1
10	(Netherlands) Suzan Lamens	6	6

==== Sixth qualifier ====
First round
6	Polina Kudermetova	5	3
(United States) Alycia Parks	7	6
PR	(Belgium) Ysaline Bonaventure	2	2
13	(United States) Bernarda Pera	6	6

Qualifying competition
(United States) Alycia Parks	6	7
14	(United States) Bernarda Pera	3	5

==== Seventh qualifier ====
First round
7	(United States) Ann Li	6	1	0^{r}
(Germany) Eva Lys	4	6	2
(Latvia) Darja Semeņistaja	1	0
12	Kamilla Rakhimova	6	6

Qualifying competition
(Germany) Eva Lys	6	6
12	Kamilla Rakhimova	1	3

==== Eighth qualifier ====
First round
8	(Bulgaria) Viktoriya Tomova	4	2^{r}
Anastasia Zakharova	6	4
(Netherlands) Arantxa Rus	4	2
9	(Japan) Moyuka Uchijima	6	6

Qualifying competition
Anastasia Zakharova	6^{3}	6	4
9	(Japan) Moyuka Uchijima	7^{7}	4	6
