= 2025 ATX Open – Doubles =

Doubles
- 2025 ATX Open

Final
- Champions: Anna Blinkova (China) Yuan Yue
- Runners-up: (United States) McCartney Kessler (China) Zhang Shuai
- Score: 3–6, 6–1, [10–4]

Details
- Draw: 16
- Seeds: 4

Events
Singles	Doubles
← 2024 ·	ATX Open	· 2026 →

Anna Blinkova and Yuan Yue defeated McCartney Kessler and Zhang Shuai in the final, 3–6, 6–1, [10–4] to win the doubles title at the 2025 ATX Open. It was the third WTA Tour doubles title for Blinkova and second for Yuan.

Olivia Gadecki and Olivia Nicholls were the reigning champions, but did not participate this year.

== Seeds ==
1. (Spain) Cristina Bucșa / (Japan) Miyu Kato (first round)
2. (United States) Caroline Dolehide / (Australia) Storm Hunter (first round)
3. (Georgia (country)) Oksana Kalashnikova / Kamilla Rakhimova (first round)
4. (United Kingdom) Maia Lumsden / (United Kingdom) Heather Watson (quarterfinals)

== Draw ==
=== Key ===
- Q = Qualifier
- WC = Wild card
- LL = Lucky loser
- Alt = Alternate
- ITF = ITF entry
- PR = Protected ranking
- SR = Special ranking
- SE = Special exempt
- JE = Junior exempt
- JR = Junior Accelerator Programme entrant
- CO = College Accelerator Programme entrant
- NG = Next Gen Accelerator Program entrant
- w/o = Walkover
- r = Retired
- d = Defaulted

=== Draw ===
First round
1	(Spain) C Bucșa (Japan) M Kato	6^{5}	4
A Blinkova (China) Y Yuan	7^{7}	6
(United Kingdom) M Brooks (United Kingdom) E Silva	w/o
(Hungary) A Bondár (United Kingdom) J Burrage
3	(Georgia (country)) O Kalashnikova; K Rakhimova	6	3	[5]
(Belgium) G Minnen (Netherlands) A Rus	4	6	[10]
(Spain) A Bolsova (Spain) Y Cavallé Reimers	6	6
(United States) M Jones (United States) C Rosca	2	4
WC	(United States) E Mandlik (United States) C McNally	3	0
(United States) M Kessler (China) S Zhang	6	6
(United States) S Chang (United States) A Kulikov	4	7	[5]
4	(United Kingdom) M Lumsden (United Kingdom) H Watson	6	5	[10]
(United States) C Corley (United Kingdom) T Moore	6^{3}	2
(United States) J Aney (United States) J Failla	7^{7}	6
(Netherlands) I Haverlag (Poland) A Rosolska	5	6	[11]
2	(United States) C Dolehide (Australia) S Hunter	7	3	[9]

Quarterfinals
A Blinkova (China) Y Yuan	6	6
(United Kingdom) M Brooks (United Kingdom) E Silva	2	0
(Belgium) G Minnen (Netherlands) A Rus
(Spain) A Bolsova (Spain) Y Cavallé Reimers	w/o
(United States) M Kessler (China) S Zhang	6	5	[10]
4	(United Kingdom) M Lumsden (United Kingdom) H Watson	3	7	[8]
(United States) J Aney (United States) J Failla	3	1
(Netherlands) I Haverlag (Poland) A Rosolska	6	6

Semifinals
A Blinkova (China) Y Yuan	2	6	[11]
(Spain) A Bolsova (Spain) Y Cavallé Reimers	6	1	[9]
(United States) M Kessler (China) S Zhang	7	6
(Netherlands) I Haverlag (Poland) A Rosolska	5	2

Final
A Blinkova (China) Y Yuan	3	6	[10]
(United States) M Kessler (China) S Zhang	6	1	[4]
