= 2023 ATX Open – Doubles =

Doubles
- 2023 ATX Open

Final
- Champions: (New Zealand) Erin Routliffe (Indonesia) Aldila Sutjiadi
- Runners-up: (United States) Nicole Melichar-Martinez (Australia) Ellen Perez
- Score: 6–4, 3–6, [10–8]

Details
- Draw: 16
- Seeds: 4

Events
Singles	Doubles
ATX Open	· 2024 →

This was the first edition of the tournament.

Erin Routliffe and Aldila Sutjiadi defeated Nicole Melichar-Martinez and Ellen Perez in the final, 6–4, 3–6, [10–8] to win the doubles tennis title at the 2023 ATX Open.

== Seeds ==
1. (United States) Nicole Melichar-Martinez / (Australia) Ellen Perez (final)
2. (New Zealand) Erin Routliffe / (Indonesia) Aldila Sutjiadi (champions)
3. (Germany) Anna-Lena Friedsam / (Ukraine) Nadiia Kichenok (semifinals)
4. (United Kingdom) Harriet Dart / Alexandra Panova (first round)

== Draw ==
Key

- Q = Qualifier
- WC = Wild card
- LL = Lucky loser
- Alt = Alternate
- ITF = ITF entry
- PR = Protected ranking
- SR = Special ranking
- SE = Special exempt
- JE = Junior exempt
- JR = Junior Accelerator Programme entrant
- CO = College Accelerator Programme entrant
- NG = Next Gen Accelerator Program entrant
- w/o = Walkover
- r = Retired
- d = Defaulted

=== Draw ===
First round
1	(United States) N Melichar-Martinez (Australia) E Perez	6	7^{7}
(United States) M Jones (United States) J Loeb	3	6^{3}
(Japan) N Hibino (Japan) M Ninomiya	2	6	[10]
A Blinkova; Y Sizikova	6	3	[7]
4	(United Kingdom) H Dart; A Panova	3	6	[7]
WC	(United States) A Krueger (United States) R Montgomery	6	3	[10]
(United States) I Neel (Australia) O Tjandramulia	6	6
(United States) Q Gleason (France) E Lechemia	3	1
(Ukraine) M Kostyuk (Ukraine) D Yastremska	5	6	[6]
(United States) A Parks (United States) S Stephens	7	3	[10]
(Hungary) A Nagy (Germany) L Papadakis	6	2	[5]
3	(Germany) A-L Friedsam (Ukraine) N Kichenok	3	6	[10]
(Indonesia) B Gumulya (Chinese Taipei) Y-c Hsieh	3	4
WC	(United States) C Chavatipon (Ukraine) S Zeynalova	6	6
(Hungary) D Gálfi (Montenegro) D Kovinić	2	1
2	(New Zealand) E Routliffe (Indonesia) A Sutjiadi	6	6

Quarterfinals
1	(United States) N Melichar-Martinez (Australia) E Perez	4	6	[10]
(Japan) N Hibino (Japan) M Ninomiya	6	3	[6]
WC	(United States) A Krueger (United States) R Montgomery	6^{7}	5
(United States) I Neel (Australia) O Tjandramulia	7^{9}	7
(United States) A Parks (United States) S Stephens	4	3
3	(Germany) A-L Friedsam (Ukraine) N Kichenok	6	6
WC	(United States) C Chavatipon (Ukraine) S Zeynalova	4	6	[7]
2	(New Zealand) E Routliffe (Indonesia) A Sutjiadi	6	2	[10]

Semifinals
1	(United States) N Melichar-Martinez (Australia) E Perez	6	6
(United States) I Neel (Australia) O Tjandramulia	3	2
3	(Germany) A-L Friedsam (Ukraine) N Kichenok	2	3
2	(New Zealand) E Routliffe (Indonesia) A Sutjiadi	6	6

Final
1	(United States) N Melichar-Martinez (Australia) E Perez	4	6	[8]
2	(New Zealand) E Routliffe (Indonesia) A Sutjiadi	6	3	[10]
