= McCartney Kessler =

American tennis player (born 1999)

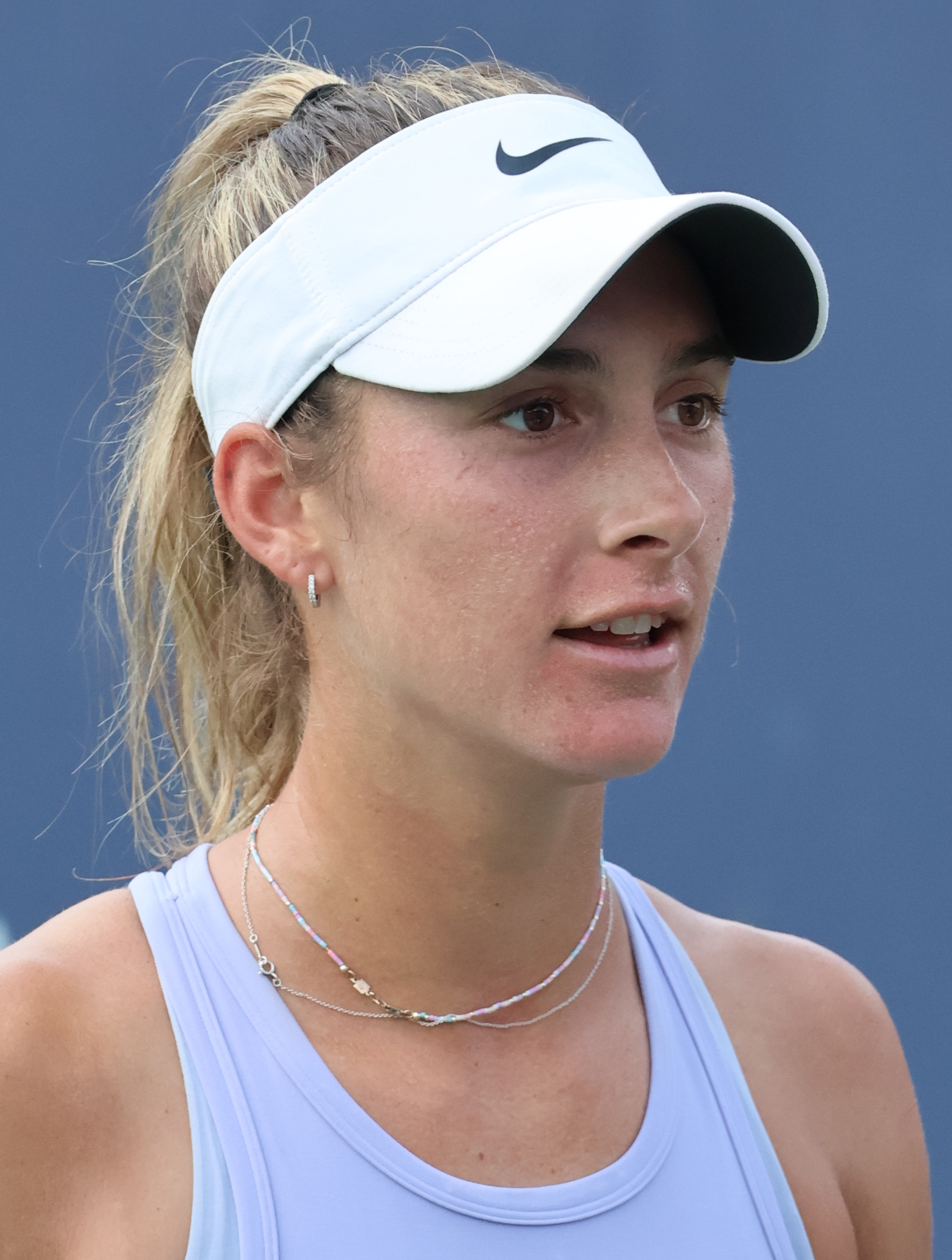
- Kessler at the 2024 Washington Open
- Country (sports): United States
- Born: July 8, 1999 (age 27) Calhoun, Georgia, U.S.
- Height: 5 ft 9 in (1.75 m)
- College: University of Florida
- Prize money: US$ 2,841,806

Singles
- Career record: 187–114
- Career titles: 3
- Highest ranking: No. 30 (June 30, 2025)
- Current ranking: No. 77 (September 28, 2026)

Grand Slam singles results
- Australian Open: 2R (2024, 2026)
- French Open: 2R (2026)
- Wimbledon: 2R (2026)
- US Open: 2R (2025)

Doubles
- Career record: 42–43
- Career titles: 1
- Highest ranking: No. 47 (September 8, 2025)
- Current ranking: No. 302 (September 28, 2026)

Grand Slam doubles results
- Australian Open: 1R (2025, 2026)
- French Open: 1R (2025)
- Wimbledon: 2R (2025)
- US Open: 2R (2025)

Team competitions
- BJK Cup: record 0–1
- Last updated on: September 29, 2026.

McCartney Kessler (born July 8, 1999) is an American professional tennis player. She has been ranked as high as No. 30 in singles and No. 47 in doubles by the WTA, both achieved in 2025. Kessler has won three singles titles and one doubles title on the WTA Tour.

== Early life, college education ==
From Calhoun, Georgia, her parents, Carl Kessler and Julie Kessler (Driggers), played collegiate tennis at University of Central Florida. She has an older sister Mackenzie, who played club tennis at the University of Central Florida, and an older brother McClain Kessler, who played collegiate tennis at Florida.

Kessler attended Calhoun High School.

Kessler signed on to the University of Florida on a tennis scholarship to play collegiate tennis for the Florida Gators in November 2017. At Florida, she was a three-time All-American and three-time First Team All-SEC player. She also earned the 2022 SEC Player of the Year Award, becoming the ninth player from University of Florida to earn the award.

== Career ==
=== 2015: Juniors ===
Kessler won the U16 doubles title at the Orange Bowl with Emma Kurtz in 2015.

=== 2024: Major & WTA Tour debuts, first title ===
Kessler made her WTA Tour debut at the Auckland Open after qualifying. She lost in the first round to Lulu Sun.

For her major debut, she received a wildcard for the Australian Open, after winning the USTA's Wild Card Challenge, and reached the second round, recording her first major match win over qualifier Fiona Ferro. She lost in the second round to Linda Nosková. In February, she won the biggest title of her career to that date at the WTA 125 in Puerto Vallarta, defeating Taylah Preston in the final.

In March, she received a wildcard from the Indian Wells Open making her WTA 1000 debut there, losing to Nuria Párrizas Díaz in the first round. In April, she entered the main draw of the WTA 500 Charleston Open as a lucky loser, making her debut at this level. She lost in the first round to Caroline Wozniacki.

Kessler qualified for Wimbledon, making her debut at the grass court major, losing to ninth seed Maria Sakkari in the first round.

Following winning a W100 title in Landisville, Pennsylvania, she reached the top 100 on 12 August 2024.

At Tennis in the Land, she reached her first WTA Tour quarterfinal by defeating fellow wildcard entrant Katrina Scott and fourth seed Wang Xinyu for her first top 50 win. Next, she defeated Arantxa Rus in straight sets. Kessler reached her first final with a come-from-behind three set victory over fifth seed Anastasia Potapova, for her second top 50 win, and won her maiden Tour title defeating top seed Beatriz Haddad Maia.

She also received a wildcard for the US Open making her debut at her home major event, losing in the first round to 19th seed Marta Kostyuk.

=== 2025: Top 30, WTA 1000 singles 4th rounds and doubles title ===
Kessler started her season at the Brisbane International, where she defeated Magda Linette, before losing to 15th seed Yulia Putintseva in the second round. The following week, she reached the final at the Hobart International with wins over seventh seed Rebecca Šramková, María Lourdes Carlé top seed Dayana Yastremska and sixth seed Elina Avanesyan. In the championship match, Kessler defeated second seed Elise Mertens in three sets to secure her second career title. As a result, she reached the top 50 at world No. 47 in the WTA singles rankings on 13 January.

In February, at the Dubai Open, Kessler defeated Amanda Anisimova in the first round and then overcame world No. 3, Coco Gauff, to record her first win against a top-5 ranked player. She lost in the third round to Karolína Muchová in a match which went to a deciding set tiebreak. Kessler reached the final at the ATX Open, and despite losing to top seed Jessica Pegula, she returned to the top 50, at world No. 48. Alongside Zhang Shuai, she was also runner-up in the doubles at the same tournament, losing the championship match to Anna Blinkova and Yuan Yue.

In June at the Nottingham Open, Kessler defeated top seed Beatriz Haddad Maia, Zhu Lin, two-time defending champion Katie Boulter and Rebecca Šramková to make it through to the final. She also won the championship match against Dayana Yastremska, in straight sets, to claim her third WTA Tour title, and first on grass courts. As a result, she broke into the top 30 for the first time on 30 June 2025.

Seeded 28th at the Canadian Open, she reached a WTA 1000 fourth round for the first time defeating world No. 5 and fourth seed Mirra Andreeva, en route, her second top 5 win. Her run was ended by 24th seed Marta Kostyuk. At the same tournament, Kessler lifted her first doubles title and first at the WTA 1000 level with Coco Gauff, defeating world doubles No. 1, Taylor Townsend and Zhang Shuai in the final.

=== 2026: Abu Dhabi and Charleston quarterfinals ===
Competing at the Australian Open, Kessler was defeated in the second round of singles by sixth seed Jessica Pegula. She and Pegula played the women's doubles together but lost in the first round to Gabriela Dabrowski and Luisa Stefani.

In February, she reached the quarterfinals at the Abu Dhabi Open, losing to third seed Clara Tauson, while the following month she also made it through to the last eight at the Charleston Open, this time falling to Yuliia Starodubtseva.

Making her debut for the United States Billie Jean King Cup team in the qualifying round against Belgium in April, Kessler suffered a sudden back injury while serving in the third set of her match with Elise Mertens and, after immediately leaving the court for medical attention, was unable to continue.

At the French Open, she defeated Guo Hanyu in three sets, before losing to eventual semifinalist Diana Shnaider in the second round. At Wimbledon, Kessler became the first unseeded player to record a double-bagel win in the women's singles at the event since Mary Pierce in 2003, when she defeated Oleksandra Oliynykova in the first round. She lost to world No. 1, Aryna Sabalenka, in the second round.

After a first round defeat against 18th seed Ekaterina Alexandrova at the US Open, Kessler announced she was ending her season early, writing on social media that 2026 had been "physically demanding" and "my team and I have decided it's time to take a step back and let my body heal."

== Performance timelines ==
Key
W	F	SF	QF	#R	RR	Q#	P#	DNQ	A	Z#	PO	G	S	B	NMS	NTI	P	NH

(W) winner; (F) finalist; (SF) semifinalist; (QF) quarterfinalist; (#R) rounds 4, 3, 2, 1; (RR) round-robin stage; (Q#) qualification round; (P#) preliminary round; (DNQ) did not qualify; (A) absent; (Z#) Davis/Fed Cup Zonal Group (with number indication) or (PO) play-off; (G) gold, (S) silver or (B) bronze Olympic/Paralympic medal; (NMS) not a Masters tournament; (NTI) not a Tier I tournament; (P) postponed; (NH) not held; (SR) strike rate (events won / competed); (W–L) win–loss record.
To avoid confusion and double counting, these charts are updated at the conclusion of a tournament or when the player's participation has ended.

=== Singles ===
Tournament	2023	2024	2025	2026	SR	W–L	Win%
Grand Slam tournaments
Australian Open	A	2R	1R	2R	0 / 3	2–3	40%
French Open	A	Q1	1R	2R	0 / 2	1–2	33%
Wimbledon	A	1R	1R	2R	0 / 3	1–3	25%
US Open	Q3	1R	2R	1R	0 / 3	1–3	25%
Win–loss	0–0	1–3	1–4	3–4	0 / 11	5–11	31%
WTA 1000 tournaments
Qatar Open	NTI	A	1R	A	0 / 1	0–1	0%
Dubai Championships	A	A	3R	A	0 / 1	2–1	67%
Indian Wells	A	1R	2R	1R	0 / 3	1–3	25%
Miami Open	A	Q1	3R	2R	0 / 2	3–2	60%
Madrid Open	A	Q1	1R	A	0 / 1	0–1	0%
Italian Open	A	A	1R	2R	0 / 2	1–2	33%
Canadian Open	A	A	4R	2R	0 / 2	4–2	67%
Cincinnati Open	A	A	3R	1R	0 / 2	2–2	50%
China Open	A	1R	4R	A	0 / 2	3–2	60%
Wuhan Open	NH	A	1R	A	0 / 1	0–1	0%

== Significant finals ==
=== WTA 1000 tournaments ===
==== Doubles: 1 (title) ====
Result	Year	Tournament	Surface	Partner	Opponents	Score
Win	2025	Canadian Open	Hard	(United States) Coco Gauff	(United States) Taylor Townsend (China) Zhang Shuai	6–4, 1–6, [13–11]

== WTA Tour finals ==
=== Singles: 4 (3 titles, 1 runner-up) ===
Legend WTA 250 (3–1)	Finals by surface Hard (2–1) Grass (1–0)	Finals by setting Outdoor (3–1)

Result	W–L	Date	Tournament	Tier	Surface	Opponent	Score
Win	1–0	Aug 2024	Tennis in the Land, US	WTA 250	Hard	(Brazil) Beatriz Haddad Maia	1–6, 6–1, 7–5
Win	2–0	Jan 2025	Hobart International, Australia	WTA 250	Hard	(Belgium) Elise Mertens	6–4, 3–6, 6–0
Loss	2–1	Mar 2025	ATX Open, US	WTA 250	Hard	(United States) Jessica Pegula	5–7, 2–6
Win	3–1	Jun 2025	Nottingham Open, UK	WTA 250	Grass	(Ukraine) Dayana Yastremska	6–4, 7–5

=== Doubles: 2 (1 title, 1 runner-up) ===
Legend WTA 1000 (1–0) WTA 250 (0–1)	Finals by surface Hard (1–1)	Finals by setting Outdoor (1–1)

Result	W–L	Date	Tournament	Tier	Surface	Partner	Opponents	Score
Loss	0–1	Mar 2025	ATX Open, United States	WTA 250	Hard	(China) Zhang Shuai	Anna Blinkova (China) Yuan Yue	6–3, 1–6, [4–10]
Win	1–1	Aug 2025	Canadian Open, Canada	WTA 1000	Hard	(United States) Coco Gauff	(United States) Taylor Townsend (China) Zhang Shuai	6–4, 1–6, [13–11]

== WTA 125 finals ==
=== Singles: 1 (title) ===
Result	W–L	Date	Tournament	Surface	Opponent	Score
Win	1–0	Feb 2024	Puerto Vallarta Open, Mexico	Hard	(Australia) Taylah Preston	5–7, 6–3, 6–0

== ITF Circuit finals ==
=== Singles: 4 (3 titles, 1 runner-up) ===
Legend W100 tournaments (1–0) W60/75 tournaments (2–0) W15 tournaments (0–1)	Finals by surface Hard (3–1)

Result	W–L	Date	Tournament	Tier	Surface	Opponent	Score
Loss	0–1	Oct 2021	ITF Lubbock, United States	W15	Hard	(United States) Adriana Reami	6–7^{(6–8)}, 1–6
Win	1–1	Oct 2023	Georgia's Rome Open, US	W60	Hard (i)	(United States) Grace Min	6–2, 6–1
Win	2–1	Jan 2024	Georgia's Rome Open, US	W75	Hard (i)	(United States) Liv Hovde	6–4, 6–1
Win	3–1	Aug 2024	Landisville Tennis Challenge, US	W100	Hard	(Australia) Olivia Gadecki	4–6, 6–2, 6–4

=== Doubles: 4 (2 titles, 2 runner-ups) ===
Legend W60 tournaments (2–1) W25 tournaments (0–1)	Finals by surface Hard (1–2) Clay (1–0)

Result	W–L	Date	Tournament	Tier	Surface	Partner	Opponents	Score
Win	1–0	Apr 2023	ITF Jackson, US	W25	Clay	(United States) Jaeda Daniel	(United States) Allura Zamarripa (United States) Maribella Zamarripa	1–6, 6–1, [10–5]
Loss	1–1	Jun 2023	Palmetto Pro Open, US	W60	Hard	(Ukraine) Yuliia Starodubtseva	(United States) Maria Mateas (United States) Anna Rogers	4–6, 7–6^{(7–3)}, [6–10]
Loss	1–2	Jul 2023	Evansville Classic, US	W60	Hard	(Ukraine) Yuliia Starodubtseva	(Russia) Maria Kononova (Russia) Veronika Miroshnichenko	3–6, 6–2, [8–10]
Win	2–2	Sep 2023	ITF Templeton Pro, US	W60	Hard	(United States) Alana Smith	(United States) Jaeda Daniel (United States) Jessie Aney	7–5, 6–4

== Best Grand Slam results details ==
=== Singles ===
Australian Open
2024 Australian Open (wildcard)
Round	Opponent	Rank	Score	MKR
1R	(France) Fiona Ferro (Q)	No. 153	3–6, 6–3, 6–2	No. 206
2R	(Czech Republic) Linda Nosková	No. 50	3–6, 6–1, 4–6	No. 206
2026 Australian Open
Round	Opponent	Rank	Score	MKR
1R	(Colombia) Emiliana Arango	No. 51	6–3, 6–2	No. 37
2R	(United States) Jessica Pegula (6)	No. 6	0–6, 2–6	No. 37

Wimbledon Championships
2026 Wimbledon
Round	Opponent	Rank	Score	MKR
1R	(Ukraine) Oleksandra Oliynykova	No. 53	6–0, 6–0	No. 57
2R	Aryna Sabalenka (1)	No. 1	1–6, 6–7^{(9–11)}	No. 57

French Open
2026 French Open
Round	Opponent	Rank	Score	MKR
1R	(China) Guo Hanyu (Q)	No. 166	4–6, 7–6^{(7–1)}, 7–5	No. 48
2R	Diana Shnaider (25)	No. 23	6–7^{(3–7)}, 1–6	No. 48

US Open
2025 US Open (32nd seed)
Round	Opponent	Rank	Score	MKR
1R	(Poland) Magda Linette	No. 37	7–5, 7–5	No. 41
2R	(Czech Republic) Markéta Vondroušová	No. 60	6–7^{(7–9)}, 2–6	No. 41

== Wins against top 10 players ==
- Kessler has a 2–4 record against players who were, at the time the match was played, ranked in the top 10

No.	Player	Rk	Event	Surface	Rd	Score	Rk	Years	Ref
1.	(United States) Coco Gauff	3	Dubai Championships, UAE	Hard	2R	6–4, 7–5	53	2025	
2.	Mirra Andreeva	5	Canadian Open, Canada	Hard	3R	7–6^{(7–5)}, 6–4	32	2025	

- Key: (Rk) first use, opponent rank; (Rd) round; (Rk) 2nd use, player rank; (Ref) reference; (F) final; (SF) semifinal; (QF) quarterfinal; (#R) rounds 4, 3, 2, 1; (RR) round-robin stage; (Q#) qualifying rounds or stages (3), 2, 1.
