= 2024 ATX Open – Singles =

Singles
- 2024 ATX Open

Final
- Champion: (China) Yuan Yue
- Runner-up: (China) Wang Xiyu
- Score: 6–4, 7–6^{(7–4)}

Details
- Draw: 32
- Seeds: 8

Events
Singles	Doubles
- ATX Open

Yuan Yue defeated Wang Xiyu in the final, 6–4, 7–6^{(7–4)} to win the singles tennis title at the 2024 ATX Open. It was her first WTA Tour title. This marked the first all-Chinese final at a tournament outside Asia since the 2006 Estoril Open.

Marta Kostyuk was the defending champion, but chose to compete in San Diego instead.

== Seeds ==
1. (Ukraine) Anhelina Kalinina (semifinals)
2. (United States) Sloane Stephens (second round)
3. (United States) Danielle Collins (quarterfinals, retired)
4. (Italy) Lucia Bronzetti (first round)
5. (France) Diane Parry (quarterfinals)
6. (China) Wang Xiyu (final)
7. (United States) Peyton Stearns (first round)
8. (China) Yuan Yue (champion)

== Draw ==
Key

- Q = Qualifier
- WC = Wild card
- LL = Lucky loser
- Alt = Alternate
- ITF = ITF entry
- PR = Protected ranking
- SR = Special ranking
- SE = Special exempt
- JE = Junior exempt
- JR = Junior Accelerator Programme entrant
- CO = College Accelerator Programme entrant
- NG = Next Gen Accelerator Program entrant
- w/o = Walkover
- r = Retired
- d = Defaulted

=== Finals ===
Semifinals
1	(Ukraine) Anhelina Kalinina	3	6^{4}
6	(China) Wang Xiyu	6	7^{7}
8	(China) Yuan Yue	6	6
(Slovakia) Anna Karolína Schmiedlová	0	3

Final
6	(China) Wang Xiyu	4	6^{4}
8	(China) Yuan Yue	6	7^{7}

=== Top half ===
First round
1	(Ukraine) A Kalinina	6	6
Q	(Czech Republic) S Bejlek	3	2
(Colombia) C Osorio	6	6
(France) A Cornet	3	2
K Rakhimova	6	6^{4}	7^{7}
(Belgium) Y Wickmayer	3	7^{7}	6^{5}
Q	(France) J Ponchet	3	6^{4}
5	(France) D Parry	6	7^{7}
3	(United States) D Collins	7	6
Q	(Australia) O Gadecki	5	3
WC	(United States) K Volynets	6	7^{8}
(Mexico) R Zarazúa	4	6^{6}
(Latvia) D Semeņistaja	6^{2}	6	6
WC	(Andorra) V Jiménez Kasintseva	7^{7}	2	4
(Argentina) N Podoroska	5	4
6	(China) Xiy Wang	7	6

Second round
1	(Ukraine) A Kalinina	6	6
(Colombia) C Osorio	1	2
K Rakhimova	3	3
5	(France) D Parry	6	6
3	(United States) D Collins	4	7^{7}	6
WC	(United States) K Volynets	6	6^{3}	0
(Latvia) D Semeņistaja	1	2
6	(China) Xiy Wang	6	6

Quarterfinals
1	(Ukraine) A Kalinina	1	6	6
5	(France) D Parry	6	4	2
3	(United States) D Collins	2	0^{r}
6	(China) Xiy Wang	6	0

Semifinals
1	(Ukraine) A Kalinina	3	6^{4}
6	(China) Xiy Wang	6	7^{7}

=== Bottom half ===
First round
8	(China) Y Yuan	3	6	6
(Australia) Ar Rodionova	6	3	1
(United States) T Townsend	3	6	6
WC	(Mexico) F Contreras Gómez	6	2	3
(Colombia) E Arango	6	6
(United States) A Parks	2	3
(China) Y Wang	7^{7}	6
4	(Italy) L Bronzetti	6^{5}	4
7	(United States) P Stearns	2	6	5
(Slovakia) AK Schmiedlová	6	4	7
Q	(Canada) R Marino	2	4
Q	(United States) S Vickery	6	6
PR	(Latvia) A Sevastova	6	6
(Argentina) J Riera	4	3
Q	(Czech Republic) T Martincová	4	0
2	(United States) S Stephens	6	6

Second round
8	(China) Y Yuan	6	7^{7}
(United States) T Townsend	3	6^{5}
(Colombia) E Arango	2	2
(China) Y Wang	6	6
(Slovakia) AK Schmiedlová	5	7^{7}	7
Q	(United States) S Vickery	7	6^{5}	5
PR	(Latvia) A Sevastova	6	6
2	(United States) S Stephens	3	2

Quarterfinals
8	(China) Y Yuan	6	7
(China) Y Wang	3	5
(Slovakia) AK Schmiedlová	4	1
PR	(Latvia) A Sevastova	6	2^{r}

Semifinals
8	(China) Y Yuan	6	6
(Slovakia) AK Schmiedlová	0	3

== Qualifying ==
=== Seeds ===
1. (Spain) Nuria Párrizas Díaz (first round)
2. (France) Jessika Ponchet (qualified)
3. (Czech Republic) Sára Bejlek (qualified)
4. (Ukraine) Yuliia Starodubtseva (qualifying competition)
5. (United States) Sachia Vickery (qualified)
6. (Netherlands) Arianne Hartono (first round)
7. (Australia) Olivia Gadecki (qualified)
8. (Canada) Rebecca Marino (qualified)
9. (France) Léolia Jeanjean (qualifying competition)
10. (Czech Republic) Tereza Martincová (qualified)
11. (France) Chloé Paquet (first round)
12. (Argentina) Martina Capurro Taborda (first round)

=== Qualifiers ===
1. (Canada) Rebecca Marino
2. (France) Jessika Ponchet
3. (Czech Republic) Sára Bejlek
4. (Czech Republic) Tereza Martincová
5. (United States) Sachia Vickery
6. (Australia) Olivia Gadecki

=== Qualifying draw ===
==== First qualifier ====
First round
1	(Spain) Nuria Párrizas Díaz	7	3	4
(Romania) Gabriela Lee	5	6	6
WC	(United States) Lyla Middleton	2	3
8	(Canada) Rebecca Marino	6	6

Qualifying competition
(Romania) Gabriela Lee	6	3	4
8	(Canada) Rebecca Marino	1	6	6

==== Second qualifier ====
First round
2	(France) Jessika Ponchet	7	6
(United States) Louisa Chirico	5	3
WC	(United States) Liv Hovde	6	6
11	(France) Chloé Paquet	4	1

Qualifying competition
2	(France) Jessika Ponchet	6	7^{7}
WC	(United States) Liv Hovde	4	6^{4}

==== Third qualifier ====
First round
3	(Czech Republic) Sára Bejlek	6	6
(France) Carole Monnet	3	2
WC	(Australia) Maya Joint	3	1
9	(France) Léolia Jeanjean	6	6

Qualifying competition
3	(Czech Republic) Sára Bejlek	6	6
9	(France) Léolia Jeanjean	1	2

==== Fourth qualifier ====
First round
4	(Ukraine) Yuliia Starodubtseva	6	6^{7}	6
(Spain) Irene Burillo Escorihuela	1	7^{9}	4
(Poland) Katarzyna Kawa	5	5
10	(Czech Republic) Tereza Martincová	7	7

Qualifying competition
4	(Ukraine) Yuliia Starodubtseva	3	6^{6}
10	(Czech Republic) Tereza Martincová	6	7^{8}

==== Fifth qualifier ====
First round
5	(United States) Sachia Vickery	5	7^{7}	6
(Canada) Carol Zhao	7	6^{4}	1
(United States) Elvina Kalieva	6	6
12	(Argentina) Martina Capurro Taborda	4	3

Qualifying competition
5	(United States) Sachia Vickery	6	3	6
(United States) Elvina Kalieva	3	6	4

==== Sixth qualifier ====
First round
6	(Netherlands) Arianne Hartono	0	3
(United States) Shelby Rogers	6	6
WC	(United States) Catherine Harrison	3	3
7	(Australia) Olivia Gadecki	6	6

Qualifying competition
(United States) Shelby Rogers	5	0^{r}
7	(Australia) Olivia Gadecki	7	2
