= ATX Open =

- 2026 ATX Open

WTA Tour
- Event name: ATX Open
- Founded: 2023
- Location: Austin, Texas; United States
- Venue: Westwood Country Club
- Category: WTA 250
- Surface: Hard outdoor
- Draw: 32S / 24Q / 16D
- Prize money: US$ 283,347
- Website: ATXOpen.com

Current champions (2026)
- Singles: (United States) Peyton Stearns
- Doubles: (Australia) Storm Hunter (United States) Taylor Townsend

The ATX Open is a professional women's tennis event held in Austin, Texas, United States. The first edition took place from 27 February to 5 March 2023. The ATX Open is part of the WTA Tour and is listed as a WTA 250 tournament. The tournament was awarded to Austin in March 2022 marking a return of the WTA Tour to Texas after a seven-year absence (since the San Antonio Open).

The tournament is held at the Westwood Country Club on eleven outdoor hardcourts. The tournament's host sponsors are Formentera Partners and Helmerich & Payne.

The DropShot Tournament Series, founded by Bryan Sheffield, is the tournament's organizer and promoter. The DropShot Tournament Series manages a collection of professional tennis tournaments with a mission to help young athletes reach their full potential and support the Austin community.

This tournament is the successor event to the Avon Futures of Austin an Avon Futures Circuit competition last played in Austin, Texas in 1979.

== Past finals ==
=== Singles ===
Year	Champion	Runner-up	Score
2026	(United States) Peyton Stearns	(United States) Taylor Townsend	7–6^{(10–8)}, 7–5
2025	(United States) Jessica Pegula	(United States) McCartney Kessler	7–5, 6–2
2024	(China) Yuan Yue	(China) Wang Xiyu	6–4, 7–6^{(7–4)}
2023	(Ukraine) Marta Kostyuk	Varvara Gracheva	6–3, 7–5

=== Doubles ===
Year	Champions	Runners-up	Score
2026	(Australia) Storm Hunter (United States) Taylor Townsend	(Hong Kong) Eudice Chong (Chinese Taipei) Liang En-shuo	6–3, 6–4
2025	Anna Blinkova (China) Yuan Yue	(United States) McCartney Kessler (China) Zhang Shuai	3–6, 6–1, [10–4]
2024	(Australia) Olivia Gadecki (United Kingdom) Olivia Nicholls	(Poland) Katarzyna Kawa (Netherlands) Bibiane Schoofs	6–2, 6–4
2023	(New Zealand) Erin Routliffe (Indonesia) Aldila Sutjiadi	(United States) Nicole Melichar-Martinez (Australia) Ellen Perez	6–4, 3–6, [10–8]

== See also ==
- Defunct Texas Tennis Open
