= Yuan Yue =

Chinese tennis player (born 1998)

- Yuan at the 2026 Wimbledon Championships
- Country (sports): China
- Born: 25 September 1998 (age 28) Yangzhou, Jiangsu, China
- Height: 1.78 m (5 ft 10 in)
- Plays: Right-handed (two-handed backhand)
- Coach: José Hernández-Fernández
- Prize money: $2,868,135

Singles
- Career record: 291–233
- Career titles: 1
- Highest ranking: No. 36 (20 May 2024)
- Current ranking: No. 173 (19 October 2026)

Grand Slam singles results
- Australian Open: 1R (2023, 2024, 2025, 2026)
- French Open: 1R (2024, 2025)
- Wimbledon: 1R (2022, 2023, 2024, 2025)
- US Open: 3R (2022)

Other tournaments
- Olympic Games: 2R (2024)

Doubles
- Career record: 65–71
- Career titles: 2
- Highest ranking: No. 57 (8 September 2025)
- Current ranking: No. 174 (29 June 2026)

Grand Slam doubles results
- Australian Open: 2R (2024, 2025)
- French Open: 2R (2024, 2025)
- Wimbledon: 1R (2024, 2025)
- US Open: 3R (2025)

Other doubles tournaments
- Olympic Games: 1R (2024)
- Last updated on: 3 July 2026.

Yuan Yue (Chinese: 袁悦; pinyin: Yuán Yuè; Mandarin pronunciation: [ɥɛ̌n ɥê]; born 25 September 1998) is a Chinese professional tennis player. She has career-high WTA rankings of No. 36 in singles, achieved in May 2024, and No. 57 in doubles, reached in September 2025.

Yuan has won one WTA Tour singles title at the 2024 ATX Open. She also earned two titles in doubles.

== Career ==
=== 2018: WTA Tour debut ===
Yuan made her WTA Tour main-draw debut at the Jiangxi International Open in the doubles tournament, partnering with Liu Yanni.

=== 2022: Major and top 75 debuts ===
She made her Grand Slam tournament main-draw debut at the 2022 Wimbledon Championships as a lucky loser.

At the next major, at the US Open, she reached the third round for the first time after qualifying by defeating Jaimee Fourlis and Irina-Camelia Begu without losing a set.

=== 2023: First WTA 1000 win and WTA Tour final ===
Yuan qualified for the 2023 Australian Open to make her debut at this major, and she also qualified for the Wimbledon Championships.

She received a wildcard for her home tournament, the China Open, and defeated Elise Mertens for her first WTA 1000 win.

Yuan reached her first WTA Tour final at the Korea Open where she lost to top seed Jessica Pegula.

=== 2024: First title & top-10 win, WTA 1000 quarterfinal, top 50 ===
At the Hobart International, she reached the semifinals after qualifying, saving four set points against Yulia Putintseva.

She reached the final at the 2024 ATX Open defeating Arina Rodionova, Taylor Townsend, Wang Yafan and Anna Karolína Schmiedlová. She won the title defeating sixth seed and compatriot Wang Xiyu. As a result, she moved into the top 50 in the rankings.

At the Indian Wells Open, she recorded her first top-10 win over eighth seed Zheng Qinwen to reach the third round of a WTA 1000 event for the first time, having never previously get past the second round. Next, she reached the quarterfinals for the first time with a win over Caroline Dolehide and 11th seed Daria Kasatkina. She lost in the last eight to third seed Coco Gauff. At the other WTA 1000, the Miami Open, she recorded her first win at this tournament over Anna Blinkova, before losing to Maria Sakkari

In October, Yuan teamed up with Demi Schuurs to win the doubles draw of the WTA 500 Ningbo Open, defeating top seeds Nicole Melichar-Martinez and Ellen Perez in the final. As a result, she reached the top 75 in the doubles rankings, on 21 October 2024.

=== 2025–2026: Second doubles title, three singles quarters ===
Partnering Anna Blinkova, Yuan won the doubles title at the 2025 ATX Open, defeating McCartney Kessler and Zhang Shuai in the final. At the 2025 Rosmalen Open, she gained entry into the main draw as a lucky loser and recorded wins over Anastasija Sevastova and Kimberly Birrell, before losing to third seed and eventual champion, Elise Mertens, in the quarterfinals.

Yuan defeated sixth seed Antonia Ružić and Sara Sorribes Tormo to reach the quarterfinals at the 2026 Transylvania Open, at which point she lost to qualifier Daria Snigur. Entering the main draw as a lucky loser, she also made it through to the quarterfinals at the 2026 ATX Open with wins over Rebecca Šramková and Dalma Gálfi, before her run was ended by Ashlyn Krueger.

== Performance timeline ==
Key
| W | F | SF | QF | #R | RR | Q# | P# | DNQ | A | Z# | PO | G | S | B | NMS | NTI | P | NH |

(W) winner; (F) finalist; (SF) semifinalist; (QF) quarterfinalist; (#R) rounds 4, 3, 2, 1; (RR) round-robin stage; (Q#) qualification round; (P#) preliminary round; (DNQ) did not qualify; (A) absent; (Z#) Davis/Fed Cup Zonal Group (with number indication) or (PO) play-off; (G) gold, (S) silver or (B) bronze Olympic/Paralympic medal; (NMS) not a Masters tournament; (NTI) not a Tier I tournament; (P) postponed; (NH) not held; (SR) strike rate (events won / competed); (W–L) win–loss record.
To avoid confusion and double counting, these charts are updated at the conclusion of a tournament or when the player's participation has ended.

Only main-draw results in WTA Tour, Grand Slam tournaments, Billie Jean King Cup, United Cup, Hopman Cup and Olympic Games are included in win–loss records.

=== Singles ===
Current through the 2025 WTA Tour.

| Tournament | 2018 | 2019 | 2020 | 2021 | 2022 | 2023 | 2024 | 2025 | SR | W–L | Win% |
|---|---|---|---|---|---|---|---|---|---|---|---|
Grand Slam tournaments
| Australian Open | A | A | Q2 | Q3 | Q3 | 1R | 1R | 1R | 0 / 3 | 0–3 | 0% |
| French Open | A | A | A | Q1 | Q1 | Q2 | 1R | 1R | 0 / 2 | 0–2 | 0% |
| Wimbledon | A | A | NH | A | 1R | 1R | 1R | 1R | 0 / 4 | 0–4 | 0% |
| US Open | A | A | A | A | 3R | Q1 | 1R | 1R | 0 / 3 | 2–3 | 40% |
| Win–Loss | 0–0 | 0–0 | 0–0 | 0–0 | 2–2 | 0–2 | 0–4 | 0–4 | 0 / 12 | 2–12 | 14% |
National representation
| Summer Olympics | Not held | | | A | NH | | 1R | NH | 0 / 1 | 0–1 | 0% |
| Billie Jean King Cup (Note: Formerly known as Fed Cup until 2020.) | A | A | A (Note: Edition is split into the two years due to COVID-19.) | | PO | Z1 | | | 0 / 0 | 5–0 | 100% |
WTA 1000 tournaments
| Qatar Open | A | NTI | A | NTI | A | NTI | Q2 | 1R | 0 / 1 | 0–1 | 0% |
| Dubai Championships | NTI | A | NTI | A | NTI | A | A | Q2 | 0 / 0 | 0–0 | – |
| Indian Wells Open | A | A | NH | Q1 | Q1 | A | QF | 1R | 0 / 2 | 4–2 | 67% |
| Miami Open | A | A | NH | A | 1R | A | 2R | 1R | 0 / 3 | 1–3 | 25% |
| Madrid Open | A | A | NH | A | A | A | 1R | A | 0 / 1 | 0–1 | 0% |
| Italian Open | A | A | A | A | A | A | 1R | A | 0 / 1 | 0–1 | 0% |
| Canadian Open | A | A | NH | A | A | Q1 | 2R | A | 0 / 1 | 1–1 | 50% |
| Cincinnati Open | A | A | A | A | A | A | 1R | 3R | 0 / 2 | 2–2 | 50% |
| China Open | A | Q2 | NH | | | 2R | 2R | 2R | 0 / 3 | 2–3 | 40% |
| Wuhan Open | A | Q1 | NH | | | | 2R | 2R | 0 / 2 | 2–2 | 50% |
| Win–Loss | 0–0 | 0–0 | 0–0 | 0–0 | 0–1 | 1–1 | 7–8 | 4–6 | 0 / 16 | 12–16 | 43% |
Career statistics
| | 2018 | 2019 | 2020 | 2021 | 2022 | 2023 | 2024 | 2025 | SR | W–L | Win% |
| Tournaments | 1 | 0 | 1 | 0 | 4 | 10 | 27 | 8 | Career total: 51 | | |
| Titles | 0 | 0 | 0 | 0 | 0 | 0 | 1 | 0 | Career total: 1 | | |
| Finals | 0 | 0 | 0 | 0 | 0 | 1 | 1 | 0 | Career total: 2 | | |
| Hard win–loss | 0–1 | 0–0 | 0–1 | 0–0 | 2–2 | 9–8 | 21–16 | 2–8 | 0 / 37 | 34–36 | 49% |
| Clay win–loss | 0–0 | 0–0 | 0–0 | 0–0 | 3–1 | 0–0 | 2–6 | 0–0 | 0 / 7 | 5–7 | 42% |
| Grass win–loss | 0–0 | 0–0 | 0–0 | 0–0 | 0–1 | 0–2 | 2–4 | 0–0 | 0 / 7 | 2–7 | 22% |
| Overall win–loss | 0–1 | 0–0 | 0–1 | 0–0 | 5–4 | 9–10 | 27–26 | 2–8 | 0 / 51 | 43–50 | 46% |
| Year-end ranking (Note: 2016: WTA ranking–931, 2017: WTA ranking–429.) | 378 | 233 | 229 | 312 | 74 | 108 | 47 | 129 | $911,304 | | |

== WTA Tour finals ==
=== Singles: 2 (1 title, 1 runner-up) ===
| Legend WTA 250 (1–1) | Finals by surface Hard (1–1) | Finals by setting Outdoor (1–1) |

| Result | W–L | Date | Tournament | Tier | Surface | Opponent | Score |
|---|---|---|---|---|---|---|---|
| Loss | 0–1 | Oct 2023 | Korea Open, South Korea | WTA 250 | Hard | (United States) Jessica Pegula | 2–6, 3–6 |
| Win | 1–1 | Mar 2024 | ATX Open, United States | WTA 250 | Hard | (China) Wang Xiyu | 6–4, 7–6^{(7–4)} |

=== Doubles: 2 (2 titles) ===
| Legend WTA 500 (1–0) WTA 250 (1–0) | Finals by surface Hard (2–0) | Finals by setting Outdoor (2–0) |

| Result | W–L | Date | Tournament | Tier | Surface | Partner | Opponents | Score |
|---|---|---|---|---|---|---|---|---|
| Win | 1–0 | Oct 2024 | Ningbo Open, China | WTA 500 | Hard | (Netherlands) Demi Schuurs | (United States) Nicole Melichar-Martinez (Australia) Ellen Perez | 6–3, 6–3 |
| Win | 2–0 | Mar 2025 | ATX Open, United States | WTA 250 | Hard | Anna Blinkova | (United States) McCartney Kessler (China) Zhang Shuai | 3–6, 6–1, [10–4] |

== WTA 125 finals ==
=== Doubles: 1 (runner-up) ===
| Result | Date | Tournament | Surface | Partner | Opponents | Score |
|---|---|---|---|---|---|---|
| Loss | Aug 2019 | Karlsruhe Open, Germany | Clay | (China) Han Xinyun | (Spain) Lara Arruabarrena (Czech Republic) Renata Voráčová | 7–6^{(7–2)}, 4–6, [4–10] |

== ITF Circuit finals ==
=== Singles: 17 (6 titles, 11 runner-ups) ===
| Legend W100 tournaments (2–2) Q80 tournaments (0–1) W60 tournaments (2–2) W40 tournaments (0–1) W25 tournaments (2–4) W15 tournaments (0–1) | Finals by surface Hard (5–10) Clay (1–1) |

| Result | W–L | Date | Tournament | Tier | Surface | Opponent | Score |
|---|---|---|---|---|---|---|---|
| Loss | 0–1 | Aug 2017 | ITF Nonthaburi, Thailand | W15 | Hard | (Australia) Sara Tomic | 4–6, 6–4, 1–6 |
| Loss | 0–2 | Aug 2017 | ITF Nonthaburi, Thailand | W25 | Hard | (Thailand) Luksika Kumkhum | 5–7, 2–6 |
| Loss | 0–3 | May 2018 | ITF Wuhan, China | W25 | Hard | (China) Lu Jiajing | 6–2, 4–6, 3–6 |
| Win | 1–3 | May 2019 | ITF Wuhan, China | W25 | Hard | (Japan) Akiko Omae | 6–3, 7–6^{(6)} |
| Loss | 1–4 | Jun 2019 | ITF Nonthaburi, Thailand | W25 | Hard | (Turkey) İpek Soylu | 6–7^{(1)}, 1–6 |
| Loss | 1–5 | Jul 2019 | ITF Ulanqab, China | W25 | Hard | (China) Lu Jiajing | 7–6^{(9)}, 3–6, 3–6 |
| Win | 2–5 | Dec 2021 | ITF Selva Gardena, Italy | W25 | Hard (i) | (Russia) Erika Andreeva | 6–2, 7–6^{(4)} |
| Win | 3–5 | Jan 2022 | Traralgon International, Australia | W60+H | Hard | (Argentina) Paula Ormaechea | 6–3, 6–2 |
| Loss | 3–6 | Jul 2022 | Liepāja Open, Latvia | W60 | Clay | (United States) Emma Navarro | 4–6, 4–6 |
| Loss | 3–7 | Sep 2022 | Berkeley Club Challenge, US | W60 | Hard | (United States) Madison Brengle | 7–6^{(3)}, 3–6, 2–6 |
| Win | 4–7 | Oct 2022 | Las Vegas Open, United States | W60 | Hard | Diana Shnaider | 4–6, 6–3, 6–1 |
| Loss | 4–8 | Oct 2022 | Tyler Pro Challenge, US | W80 | Hard | (United States) Taylor Townsend | 4–6, 2–6 |
| Loss | 4–9 | Feb 2023 | ITF Mexico City, Mexico | W40 | Hard | (Turkey) Berfu Cengiz | 4–6, 6–1, 6–7^{(9)} |
| Loss | 4–10 | Oct 2023 | Shenzhen Longhua Open, China | W100 | Hard | (China) Bai Zhuoxuan | 6–7^{(5)}, 2–6 |
| Win | 5–10 | Nov 2023 | Takasaki Open, Japan | W100 | Hard | (United Kingdom) Harriet Dart | 5–7, 7–5, 6–0 |
| Loss | 5–11 | Nov 2023 | Takasaki Open 2, Japan | W100 | Hard | (China) Bai Zhuoxuan | 2–6, 3–6 |
| Win | 6–11 | Apr 2025 | Oeiras CETO Open, Portugal | W100 | Clay | (Belgium) Greet Minnen | 4–6, 6–4, 6–2 |

=== Doubles: 5 (3 titles, 2 runner-ups) ===
| Legend W60 tournaments (2–1) W25 tournaments (1–1) | Finals by surface Hard (2–1) Clay (1–1) |

| Result | W–L | Date | Tournament | Tier | Surface | Partner | Opponents | Score |
|---|---|---|---|---|---|---|---|---|
| Loss | 0–1 | Aug 2018 | ITF Guiyang, China | W25 | Hard | (China) Chen Jiahui | (China) Kang Jiaqi (China) Xun Fangying | 6–3, 5–7, [6–10] |
| Win | 1–1 | Aug 2019 | Jinan Open, China | W60 | Hard | (China) Zheng Wushuang | (United Kingdom) Samantha Murray (United Kingdom) Eden Silva | 1–6, 6–4, [10–7] |
| Loss | 1–2 | Jun 2021 | Open de Montpellier, France | W60 | Clay | (Chinese Taipei) Liang En-shuo | (France) Estelle Cascino (Italy) Camilla Rosatello | 3–6, 2–6 |
| Win | 2–2 | Oct 2021 | ITF Lagos, Portugal | W25 | Hard | (Latvia) Diāna Marcinkēviča | (Czech Republic) Miriam Kolodziejová (Czech Republic) Jesika Malečková | w/o |
| Win | 3–2 | Apr 2023 | Charlottesville Open, United States | W60 | Clay | (United States) Sophie Chang | (Japan) Nao Hibino (Hungary) Fanny Stollár | 6–3, 6–3 |

== Wins against top 10 players ==
- Yuan has a 1–12 win-loss record against players who were, at the time the match was played, ranked in the top 10.

| No. | Player | Rk | Event | Surface | Rd | Score | Rk | Years | Ref |
|---|---|---|---|---|---|---|---|---|---|
| 1. | (China) Zheng Qinwen | 8 | Indian Wells Open, US | Hard | 2R | 6–4, 6–3 | 49 | 2024 | |

- Key: (Rk) first use, opponent rank; (Rd) round; (Rk) 2nd use, player rank; (Ref) reference; (F) final; (SF) semifinal; (QF) quarterfinal; (#R) rounds 4, 3, 2, 1; (RR) round-robin stage; (Q#) qualifying rounds or stages (3), 2, 1.

*As of 16 October 2025
