= Peyton Stearns =

American tennis player (born 2001)

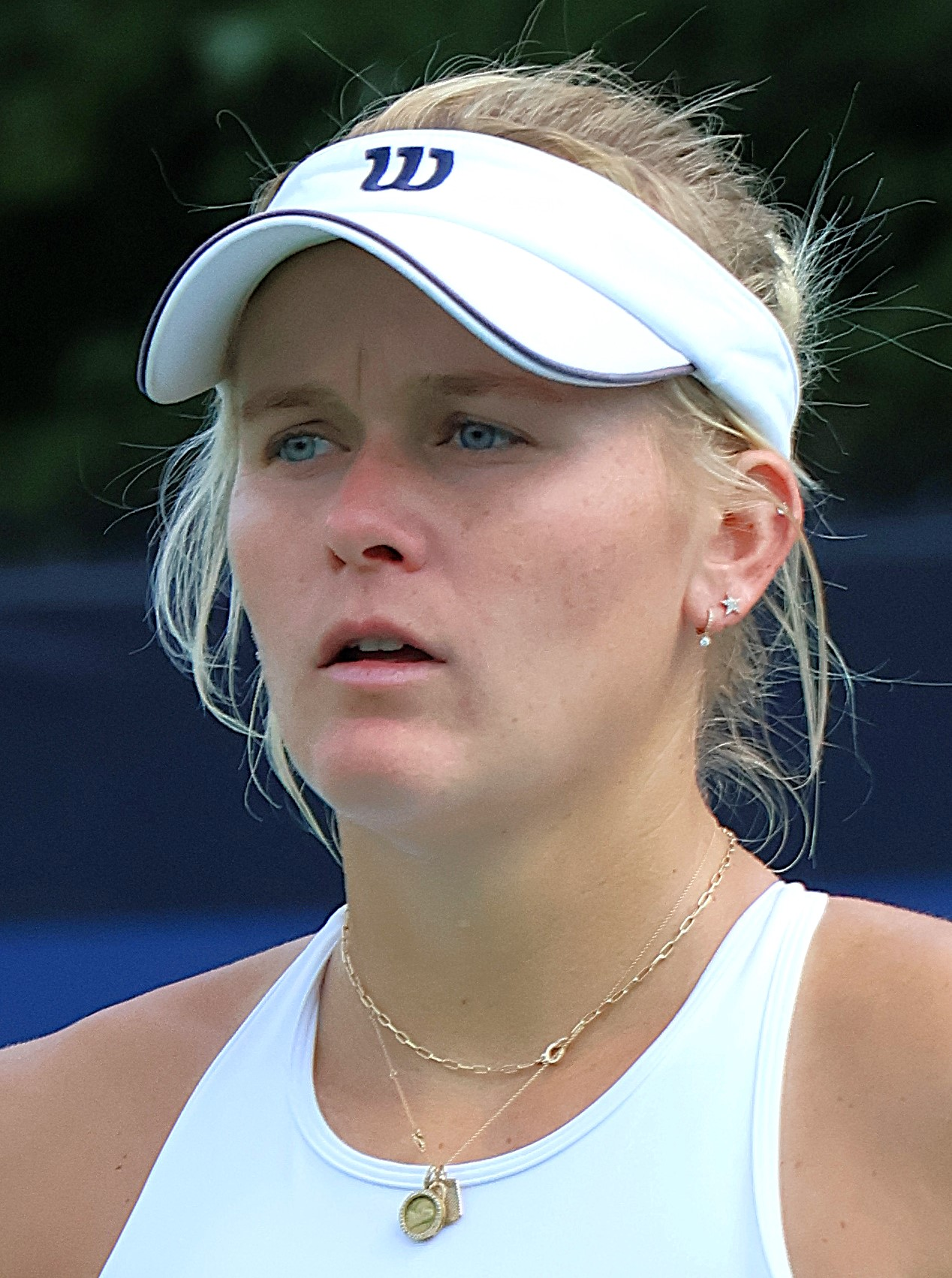
- Stearns at the 2024 Washington Open
- Country (sports): United States
- Born: October 8, 2001 (age 25) Cincinnati, Ohio
- Height: 1.73 m (5 ft 8 in)
- Turned pro: June 2022
- Plays: Right (two-handed backhand)
- College: Texas
- Coach: Blaž Kavčič (May 2025-); David Witt (2026-)
- Prize money: $4,554,320

Singles
- Career record: 203–151
- Career titles: 2 WTA, 5 ITF
- Highest ranking: No. 28 (May 19, 2025)
- Current ranking: No. 37 (November 2, 2026)

Grand Slam singles results
- Australian Open: 3R (2026)
- French Open: 3R (2023, 2024, 2026)
- Wimbledon: 1R (2023, 2024, 2025, 2026)
- US Open: 4R (2023)

Doubles
- Career record: 62–66
- Career titles: 0 WTA, 2 ITF
- Highest ranking: No. 46 (February 2, 2026)
- Current ranking: No. 109 (November 2, 2026)

Grand Slam doubles results
- Australian Open: 3R (2026)
- French Open: 2R (2023, 2025)
- Wimbledon: 2R (2024, 2026)
- US Open: 2R (2024, 2025)

Grand Slam mixed doubles results
- US Open: Q2 (2026)
- Last updated on: November 8, 2026.

Peyton Mckenzie Stearns (born October 8, 2001) is an American professional tennis player. She has a career-high WTA singles ranking of No. 28, achieved on May 19, 2025, and a best in doubles of No. 46, reached on February 2, 2026. She has won two WTA Tour singles titles, as well as five singles and two doubles titles on the ITF Women's World Tour.

Stearns played college tennis for the Texas Longhorns. In spring 2022, Stearns became the first Texas player to become the National Collegiate Athletic Association (NCAA) champion in women's tennis and elected to turn professional later that year.

In her first full season on tour in 2023, Stearns made her top 100 debut in April, after reaching her first WTA Tour quarterfinal at the inaugural ATX Open in March 2023, before reaching her first career final at the Copa Colsanitas the following month.

At the 2023 US Open, she made a major fourth round for the first time and, as a result, reached the top 50 in September 2023.

At the 2025 Italian Open, Stearns became the first player in the Open Era to win three consecutive WTA Tour main-draw matches in third-set tiebreaks having beaten Madison Keys, Naomi Osaka and Elina Svitolina across round 3 to quarterfinal.

== Early life ==
Stearns was born in Cincinnati, Ohio, and raised in nearby Mason. Her mother, Denise Stearns, was a gymnast at the University of Texas at Austin, while her younger brother, Preston, also pursued tennis, playing for Ohio State University.

As a child, Stearns participated in several sports, including gymnastics, soccer and basketball. She began taking tennis lessons at the age of eight and decided to focus on the sport a few years later. She was coached by Mario Contardi from the ages of nine to twelve.

Stearns attended St. Margaret of York School through eighth grade before continuing her high school education online to accommodate her tennis schedule.

== College years ==
Stearns attended the University of Texas at Austin, where she majored in applied movement science and played college tennis for the Texas Longhorns for two seasons. In May 2022, she became the first player in the university's history to win the NCAA Division I women's singles national championship. She has cited the success of fellow American Danielle Collins as inspiration for her decision to attend college before turning professional in June 2022.

== Career ==
=== 2021–2022: WTA Tour & major debuts ===
Stearns made her WTA Tour main-draw debut at the 2021 Silicon Valley Classic, where she received entry as an alternate into the doubles main draw. She made her major debut as a wildcard entrant at the 2022 US Open.

=== 2023: WTA Tour final, major fourth round and top 50 ===
At the inaugural ATX Open in Austin, Stearns earned her first WTA Tour win as a wildcard over qualifier Katie Boulter in a three-hour marathon. Next, she defeated fellow wildcard player Mirjam Björklund to reach her first tour quarterfinal, where she lost to Katie Volynets in straight sets. The following week, she made her main-draw debut at the WTA 1000 Indian Wells Open as a wildcard and overcame a set deficit to defeat Rebeka Masarova in the first round, before succumbing to Bianca Andreescu from a set up in the next round.

Stearns reached her first WTA Tour singles final at the Copa Colsanitas, defeating Rosa Vicens Mas, Elina Avanesyan, Tamara Zidanšek and Kamilla Rakhimova. Though she fell in three sets to defending champion Tatjana Maria in the championship match, her results at the tournament propelled her into the top 100 for the first time, at world No. 89, on April 10. This also ensured Stearns a direct entry into the main draw of the 2023 French Open. Later that month, she reached the final of the LTP Charleston Pro losing it to compatriot Emma Navarro, in three sets.

At the Morocco Open in Rabat, Stearns defeated Panna Udvardy and Leylah Fernandez to reach her third tour quarterfinal. She lost it to Sloane Stephens in a third-set tiebreak, despite holding three match points.

Ranked world No. 69 at the French Open, Stearns recorded her first top-50 win, defeating No. 49 Kateřina Siniaková. She immediately followed that up with her first top-20 win, defeating former champion and 17th seed, Jeļena Ostapenko, in three sets. She was defeated by ninth seed Daria Kasatkina in the third round.

At the US Open, she reached the fourth round defeating Viktoriya Tomova, Clara Tauson and Katie Boulter. As a result, she reached the top 50 at world No. 44, on 11 September 2023.

=== 2024: WTA Tour title, French and US Open 3rd rounds, WTA 1000 quarters ===
In Indian Wells, Stearns recorded her second WTA 1000 win over Elisabetta Cocciaretto. She held four match points against world No. 2, Aryna Sabalenka, in the second round but lost the match in the third set tiebreak. On her debut in the main draw at the Miami Open, she also reached the second round with a win over Wang Yafan, before losing to Victoria Azarenka.

Stearns won her maiden career title at the Rabat Grand Prix in Morocco, defeating Mayar Sherif in the final. She reached for the second consecutive time the third round at the French Open, with wins over first time major qualifier Lucija Ćirić Bagarić in three sets, and tenth seed Daria Kasatkina.

At the WTA 1000 Canadian Open in Toronto, she reached the quarterfinals for the first time at this level, defeating Anna Blinkova, and then upsetting seventh seed Madison Keys and 12th seed Victoria Azarenka, both matches by retirement. She lost to third seed and eventual champion Jessica Pegula.

Ranked No. 47 at the US Open, she again reached the third round defeating Lesia Tsurenko and upsetting 12th seed Daria Kasatkina to set up a meeting with 24th seed Donna Vekić which she lost in straight sets.

=== 2025: First WTA 1000 semifinal and top-10 wins ===
In February, at the Dubai Championships, Stearns defeated Ons Jabeur in the first round and then overcame world No. 8, Zheng Qinwen, in three sets to record her first win against a top-10 ranked player. She lost in the third round to 12th seed Mirra Andreeva in a match played later on the same day as her encounter with Zheng due to rain interruptions setting the tournament schedule back.

In April, at the Madrid Open, Stearns defeated Kimberly Birrell, 15th seed Amanda Anisimova and qualifier Rebeka Masarova to reach the fourth round, where she lost to world No. 1, Aryna Sabalenka. At the next WTA 1000, the Italian Open, Stearns reached back-to-back fourth rounds with an upset over fifth seed Madison Keys. Next she defeated Naomi Osaka to reach her second WTA 1000 quarterfinal and first on clay. Stearns then overcame 16th seed Elina Svitolina to make it through to her first WTA 1000 semifinal, which she lost to sixth seed, and eventual champion, Jasmine Paolini.

=== 2026: Second WTA Tour title ===
At the Australian Open, Stearns defeated Sofia Kenin and Petra Marčinko to reach the third round, at which point her run was ended by world No. 3, Amanda Anisimova.

Seeded fourth at the ATX Open, she recorded wins over Francesca Jones, Kaja Juvan, Oksana Selekhmeteva and Kimberly Birrell to make it through to the final. Stearns won the championship match against Taylor Townsend to claim her second WTA Tour title.

In September at the Guadalajara Open, she defeated Emiliana Arango, fourth seed Diane Parry, wildcard entrant Sloane Stephens and eighth seed Liudmila Samsonova to reach the final,.where she lost to second seed and defending champion Iva Jovic.

== Performance timelines ==
Key
W	F	SF	QF	#R	RR	Q#	P#	DNQ	A	Z#	PO	G	S	B	NMS	NTI	P	NH

(W) winner; (F) finalist; (SF) semifinalist; (QF) quarterfinalist; (#R) rounds 4, 3, 2, 1; (RR) round-robin stage; (Q#) qualification round; (P#) preliminary round; (DNQ) did not qualify; (A) absent; (Z#) Davis/Fed Cup Zonal Group (with number indication) or (PO) play-off; (G) gold, (S) silver or (B) bronze Olympic/Paralympic medal; (NMS) not a Masters tournament; (NTI) not a Tier I tournament; (P) postponed; (NH) not held; (SR) strike rate (events won / competed); (W–L) win–loss record.
To avoid confusion and double counting, these charts are updated at the conclusion of a tournament or when the player's participation has ended.

Only main-draw results in WTA Tour, Grand Slam tournaments, Billie Jean King Cup, United Cup, Hopman Cup and Olympic Games are included in win–loss records.

=== Singles ===
Current through the 2026 Japan Women's Open.

Tournament	2021	2022	2023	2024	2025	2026	SR	W–L	Win %
Grand Slam tournaments
Australian Open	A	A	A	1R	1R	3R	0 / 3	2–3	40%
French Open	A	A	3R	3R	1R	3R	0 / 4	6–4	60%
Wimbledon	A	A	1R	1R	1R	1R	0 / 4	0–4	0%
US Open	Q1	1R	4R	3R	2R	1R	0 / 5	6–5	55%
Win–loss	0–0	0–1	5–3	4–4	1–4	4–4	0 / 16	14–16	47%
WTA 1000 tournaments
Qatar Open	NTI	A	NTI	1R	2R	1R	0 / 3	1–3	25%
Dubai Championships	A	NTI	A	2R	3R	2R	0 / 3	4–3	57%
Indian Wells Open	Q2	A	2R	2R	1R	1R	0 / 4	2–4	33%
Miami Open	A	A	Q2	2R	2R	2R	0 / 3	3–3	50%
Madrid Open	A	A	A	1R	4R	2R	0 / 3	4–3	57%
Italian Open	A	A	A	A	SF	2R	0 / 2	6–2	75%
Canadian Open	A	A	1R	QF	1R	1R	0 / 4	3–4	43%
Cincinnati Open	Q1	Q2	1R	1R	2R	2R	0 / 4	2–4	33%
Guadalajara Open	NH	A	1R	NTI			0 / 1	0–1	0%
China Open	NH		1R	3R	1R	1R	0 / 4	2–4	33%
Wuhan Open	NH			A	A	Q1	0 / 0	0–0	–
Win–loss	0–0	0–0	1–5	8–8	13–9	5–9	0 / 31	27–31	47%
Career statistics
	2021	2022	2023	2024	2025	2026	SR	W–L	Win %
Tournaments	0	2	14	22	21	21	Career total: 80		
Titles	0	0	0	1	0	1	Career total: 2		
Finals	0	0	1	1	0	2	Career total: 4		
Hard win–loss	0–0	0–2	8–10	13–15	8–15	17–14	1 / 57	46–56	45%
Clay win–loss	0–0	0–0	8–3	7–4	8–4	6–5	1 / 17	29–16	64%
Grass win–loss	0–0	0–0	0–1	1–2	1–2	0–1	0 / 6	2–6	25%
Overall win–loss	0–0	0–2	16–14	21–21	17–21	23–20	2 / 80	77–78	50%
Win %	–	0%	53%	50%	45%	53%	Career total: 50%		
Year-end ranking (Note: 2018: WTA ranking–887, 2019: WTA ranking–520, 2020: WTA ranking–478.)	392	209	53	48	63		$4,554,320		

=== Doubles ===
Current through the 2026 Guadalajara Open.

Tournament	2021	2022	2023	2024	SR	W–L	Win %
Grand Slam tournaments
Australian Open	A	A	A	2R	0 / 1	1–1	50%
French Open	A	A	2R	1R	0 / 2	1–2	33%
Wimbledon	A	A	1R	2R	0 / 2	1–2	33%
US Open	A	1R	1R	2R	0 / 3	1–3	25%
Win–loss	0–0	0–1	1–3	3–4	0 / 8	4–8	33%
WTA 1000
Qatar Open	NTI	A	NTI	A	0 / 0	0–0	–
Dubai Championships	A	NTI	A	A	0 / 0	0–0	–
Indian Wells Open	A	A	2R	A	0 / 1	1–1	50%
Miami Open	A	A	1R	A	0 / 1	0–1	0%
Madrid Open	A	A	A	A	0 / 0	0–0	–
Italian Open	A	A	A	A	0 / 0	0–0	–
Canadian Open	A	A	A	2R	0 / 1	1–1	50%
Cincinnati Open	1R	A	2R	2R	0 / 3	2–3	40%
Guadalajara Open	NH	A	2R	NTI	0 / 1	1–1	50%
China Open	NH		SF	A	0 / 1	3–1	75%
Wuhan Open	NH			A	0 / 0	0–0	–
Win–loss	0–1	0–0	6–5	2–2	0 / 8	8–8	50%
Career statistics
Tournaments	2	2	9	10	Career total: 23		
Overall win–loss	0–2	1–2	8–9	6–10	0 / 21	15–21	42%
Year-end ranking (Note: 2018: WTA ranking-1005, 2019: WTA ranking-877, 2020: WTA ranking-756.)	538	266	101				

== WTA Tour finals ==
=== Singles: 4 (2 titles, 2 runner-ups) ===
Legend WTA 500 (0–1) WTA 250 (2–1)	Finals by surface Hard (1–1) Clay (1–1)	Finals by setting Outdoor (2–2)

Result	W–L	Date	Tournament	Tier	Surface	Opponent	Score
Loss	0–1	Apr 2023	Copa Colsanitas, Colombia	WTA 250	Clay	(Germany) Tatjana Maria	3–6, 6–2, 4–6
Win	1–1	May 2024	Rabat Grand Prix, Morocco	WTA 250	Clay	(Egypt) Mayar Sherif	6–2, 6–1
Win	2–1	Feb 2026	ATX Open, US	WTA 250	Hard	(United States) Taylor Townsend	7–6^{(10–8)}, 7–5
Loss	2–2	Sep 2026	Guadalajara Open, Mexico	WTA 500	Hard	(United States) Iva Jovic	4–6, 2–6

== ITF Circuit finals ==
=== Singles: 9 (5 titles, 4 runner-ups) ===
Legend W100 tournaments (0–1) W60 tournaments (1–0) W25 tournaments (4–3)	Finals by surface Hard (5–2) Clay (0–2)

Result	W–L	Date	Tournament	Tier	Surface	Opponent	Score
Loss	0–1	Oct 2019	ITF Florence, US	W25	Hard	(United States) Claire Liu	1–6, 2–6
Win	1–1	Jun 2021	ITF Sumter, US	W25	Hard	(Mexico) Fernanda Contreras	6–1, 6–2
Loss	1–2	Jul 2022	ITF Columbus, US	W25	Hard	(United States) Katrina Scott	5–7, 3–6
Win	2–2	Oct 2022	ITF Austin, US	W25	Hard	(United States) Clervie Ngounoue	6–1, 6–0
Win	3–2	Oct 2022	ITF Florence, US	W25	Hard	(Germany) Alexandra Vecic	6–7^{(4)}, 6–2, 7–5
Loss	3–3	Jan 2023	ITF Naples, US	W25	Clay	(United States) Emma Navarro	3–6, 5–7
Win	4–3	Jan 2023	ITF Orlando, US	W25	Hard	(United States) Robin Montgomery	6–2, 6–0
Win	5–3	Feb 2023	Georgia's Rome Open, US	W60	Hard (i)	(Czech Republic) Gabriela Knutson	3–6, 6–0, 6–2
Loss	5–4	Apr 2023	LTP Charleston Pro, US	W100	Clay	(United States) Emma Navarro	6–2, 2–6, 5–7

=== Doubles: 3 (2 titles, 1 runner-up) ===
Legend W60 tournaments (1–1) W25 tournaments (1–0)	Finals by surface Hard (2–0) Clay (0–1)

Result	W–L	Date	Tournament	Tier	Surface	Partner	Opponents	Score
Loss	0–1	Jun 2021	LTP Charleston Pro, US	W60	Clay	(United States) Rasheeda McAdoo	(Hungary) Fanny Stollár (Indonesia) Aldila Sutjiadi	0–6, 4–6
Win	1–1	Jun 2022	ITF Sumter, US	W25	Hard	(United States) Kylie Collins	(United States) Allura Zamarripa (United States) Maribella Zamarripa	6–3, 5–7, [10–7]
Win	2–1	Sep 2022	Berkeley Tennis Challenge, US	W60	Hard	(United States) Elvina Kalieva	(United States) Allura Zamarripa (United States) Maribella Zamarripa	7–6^{(5)}, 7–6^{(5)}

== Wins against top 10 players ==
- Stearns has a 2–12 record against players who were, at the time the match was played, ranked in the top 10.

#	Opponent	Rk	Event	Surface	Rd	Score	Rk	Years	Ref
1	(China) Zheng Qinwen	8	Dubai Championships, UAE	Hard	2R	3–6, 6–4, 6–4	46	2025	
2	(United States) Madison Keys	6	Italian Open, Italy	Clay	3R	2–6, 6–2, 7–6^{(7–3)}	42	2025	
