= 2025 WTA 1000 tournaments =

Women's professional tennis tour

2025 WTA 1000
Details
- Duration: February 9 – October 12
- Edition: 36th
- Tournaments: 10

Achievements (singles)
- Most titles: Mirra Andreeva; Aryna Sabalenka (United States) Amanda Anisimova (2)
- Most finals: Aryna Sabalenka (United States) Coco Gauff (3)

The WTA 1000 tournaments, make up the elite tour for professional women's tennis organized by the WTA called the WTA Tour. The tier consists of ten mandatory events.

== Tournaments ==
Tournament	Location	Surface	Date	Prize money
Qatar Open	Doha, Qatar	Hard	Feb 9 – 15	$3,654,963
Dubai Tennis Championships	Dubai, United Arab Emirates	Hard	Feb 16 – 22	$3,654,963
Indian Wells Open	Indian Wells, United States	Hard	Mar 5 – 16	$9,489,532
Miami Open	Miami, United States	Hard	Mar 18 – 30	$8,963,700
Madrid Open	Madrid, Spain	Clay (red)	Apr 22 – May 4	$8,963,700
Italian Open	Rome, Italy	Clay (red)	May 6 – 18	$6,911,032
Canadian Open	Montreal, Canada	Hard	Jul 27 – Aug 7	$5,152,599
Cincinnati Open	Cincinnati, United States	Hard	Aug 7 – 18	$5,152,599
China Open	Beijing, China	Hard	Sep 24 – Oct 5	$8,963,700
Wuhan Open	Wuhan, China	Hard	Oct 6 – 12	$3,654,963

== Results ==
* First-time champion

Tournament	Singles champions	Runners-up	Score	Doubles champions	Runners-up	Score
Qatar Open Singles – Doubles	(United States) Amanda Anisimova*	(Latvia) Jeļena Ostapenko	6–4, 6–3	(Italy) Sara Errani (Italy) Jasmine Paolini	(China) Jiang Xinyu (Chinese Taipei) Wu Fang-hsien	7–5, 7–6^{(12–10)}
Dubai Open Singles – Doubles	Mirra Andreeva*	(Denmark) Clara Tauson	7–6^{(7–1)}, 6–1	(Czech Republic) Kateřina Siniaková (United States) Taylor Townsend	(Chinese Taipei) Hsieh Su-wei (Latvia) Jeļena Ostapenko	7–6^{(7–5)}, 6–4
Indian Wells Open Singles – Doubles	Mirra Andreeva (2)	Aryna Sabalenka	2–6, 6–4, 6–3	(United States) Asia Muhammad (Netherlands) Demi Schuurs	(Slovakia) Tereza Mihalíková (United Kingdom) Olivia Nicholls	6–2, 7–6^{(7–4)}
Miami Open Singles – Doubles	Aryna Sabalenka	(United States) Jessica Pegula	7–5, 6–2	Mirra Andreeva; Diana Shnaider	(Spain) Cristina Bucșa (Japan) Miyu Kato	6–3, 6–7^{(5–7)}, [10–2]
Madrid Open Singles – Doubles	Aryna Sabalenka (2)	(United States) Coco Gauff	6–3, 7–6^{(7–3)}	(Romania) Sorana Cîrstea*; Anna Kalinskaya*	Veronika Kudermetova (Belgium) Elise Mertens	6–7^{(10–12)}, 6–2, [12–10]
Italian Open Singles – Doubles	(Italy) Jasmine Paolini	(United States) Coco Gauff	6–4, 6–2	(Italy) Sara Errani (2) (Italy) Jasmine Paolini (2)	Veronika Kudermetova (Belgium) Elise Mertens	6–4, 7–5
Canadian Open Singles – Doubles	(Canada) Victoria Mboko*	(Japan) Naomi Osaka	2–6, 6–4, 6–1	(United States) Coco Gauff	(United States) Taylor Townsend (China) Zhang Shuai	6–4, 1–6, [13–11]
Canadian Open Singles – Doubles	(Canada) Victoria Mboko*	(Japan) Naomi Osaka	2–6, 6–4, 6–1	(United States) McCartney Kessler*	(United States) Taylor Townsend (China) Zhang Shuai	6–4, 1–6, [13–11]
Cincinnati Open Singles – Doubles	(Poland) Iga Świątek	(Italy) Jasmine Paolini	7–5, 6–4	(Canada) Gabriela Dabrowski (New Zealand) Erin Routliffe	(China) Guo Hanyu; Alexandra Panova	6–4, 6–3
China Open Singles – Doubles	(United States) Amanda Anisimova (2)	(Czech Republic) Linda Nosková	6–0, 2–6, 6–2	(Italy) Sara Errani (3) (Italy) Jasmine Paolini (3)	(Japan) Miyu Kato (Hungary) Fanny Stollár	6–7^{(1–7)}, 6–3, [10–2]
Wuhan Open Singles – Doubles	(United States) Coco Gauff	(United States) Jessica Pegula	6–4, 7–5	(Australia) Storm Hunter (Czech Republic) Kateřina Siniaková (2)	(Kazakhstan) Anna Danilina (Serbia) Aleksandra Krunić	6–3, 6–2

== Tournament details ==
Key

- Q = Qualifier
- WC = Wild card
- LL = Lucky loser
- Alt = Alternate
- ITF = ITF entry
- PR = Protected ranking
- SR = Special ranking
- SE = Special exempt
- JE = Junior exempt
- JR = Junior Accelerator Programme entrant
- CO = College Accelerator Programme entrant
- NG = Next Gen Accelerator Program entrant
- w/o = Walkover
- r = Retired
- d = Defaulted

=== Qatar Open ===
==== Singles ====
Quarterfinals
Ekaterina Alexandrova	4	6	6
6	(United States) Jessica Pegula	6	1	1
(Ukraine) Marta Kostyuk	6	5	4
(United States) Amanda Anisimova	4	7	6
(Tunisia) Ons Jabeur	2	2
(Latvia) Jeļena Ostapenko	6	6
5	(Kazakhstan) Elena Rybakina	2	5
2	(Poland) Iga Świątek	6	7

Semifinals
Ekaterina Alexandrova	3	3
(United States) Amanda Anisimova	6	6
(Latvia) Jeļena Ostapenko	6	6
2	(Poland) Iga Świątek	3	1

Final
(United States) Amanda Anisimova	6	6
(Latvia) Jeļena Ostapenko	4	3

==== Doubles ====
Semifinals
Mirra Andreeva; Diana Shnaider	6	6^{2}	[9]
3	(Italy) Sara Errani (Italy) Jasmine Paolini	4	7^{7}	[11]
(Brazil) Beatriz Haddad Maia (Germany) Laura Siegemund	2	3
(China) Jiang Xinyu (Chinese Taipei) Wu Fang-hsien	6	6

Final
3	(Italy) Sara Errani (Italy) Jasmine Paolini	7	7^{12}
(China) Jiang Xinyu (Chinese Taipei) Wu Fang-hsien	5	6^{10}

=== Dubai Championships ===
==== Singles ====
Quarterfinals
(Denmark) Clara Tauson	7^{7}	6
(Czech Republic) Linda Nosková	6^{4}	4
14	(Czech Republic) Karolína Muchová	6	7
WC	(Romania) Sorana Cîrstea	2	5
6	(Kazakhstan) Elena Rybakina	6	7^{7}
WC	(United States) Sofia Kenin	2	6^{2}
12	Mirra Andreeva	6	6
2	(Poland) Iga Świątek	3	3

Semifinals
(Denmark) Clara Tauson	6	6^{4}	6
14	(Czech Republic) Karolína Muchová	4	7^{7}	3
6	(Kazakhstan) Elena Rybakina	4	6	3
12	Mirra Andreeva	6	4	6

Final
(Denmark) Clara Tauson	6^{1}	1
12	Mirra Andreeva	7^{7}	6

==== Doubles ====
Semifinals
1	(Czech Republic) Kateřina Siniaková (United States) Taylor Townsend	7	7
(France) Kristina Mladenovic (China) Zhang Shuai	5	5
3	(Chinese Taipei) Hsieh Su-wei (Latvia) Jeļena Ostapenko	6	4	[10]
PR	(China) Xu Yifan (China) Yang Zhaoxuan	4	6	[2]

Final
1	(Czech Republic) Kateřina Siniaková (United States) Taylor Townsend	7^{7}	6
3	(Chinese Taipei) Hsieh Su-wei (Latvia) Jeļena Ostapenko	6^{5}	4

=== Indian Wells Open ===
==== Singles ====
Quarterfinals
1	Aryna Sabalenka	6	6
24	Liudmila Samsonova	2	3
WC	(Switzerland) Belinda Bencic	1	1
5	(United States) Madison Keys	6	6
9	Mirra Andreeva	7	6
23	(Ukraine) Elina Svitolina	5	3
8	(China) Zheng Qinwen	3	3
2	(Poland) Iga Świątek	6	6

Semifinals
1	Aryna Sabalenka	6	6
5	(United States) Madison Keys	0	1
9	Mirra Andreeva	7^{7}	1	6
2	(Poland) Iga Świątek	6^{1}	6	3

Final
1	Aryna Sabalenka	6	4	3
9	Mirra Andreeva	2	6	6

==== Doubles ====
Semifinals
1	(Czech Republic) Kateřina Siniaková (United States) Taylor Townsend	4	6	[8]
(United States) Asia Muhammad (Netherlands) Demi Schuurs	6	4	[10]
5	(Chinese Taipei) Hsieh Su-wei (China) Zhang Shuai	5	3
(Slovakia) Tereza Mihalíková (United Kingdom) Olivia Nicholls	7	6

Final
(United States) Asia Muhammad (Netherlands) Demi Schuurs	6	7^{7}
(Slovakia) Tereza Mihalíková (United Kingdom) Olivia Nicholls	2	6^{4}

=== Miami Open ===
==== Singles ====
Quarterfinals
1	Aryna Sabalenka	6	7
9	(China) Zheng Qinwen	2	5
(Poland) Magda Linette	3	2
6	(Italy) Jasmine Paolini	6	6
(United Kingdom) Emma Raducanu	4	7^{7}	2
4	(United States) Jessica Pegula	6	6^{3}	6
WC	(Philippines) Alexandra Eala	6	7
2	(Poland) Iga Świątek	2	5

Semifinals
1	Aryna Sabalenka	6	6
6	(Italy) Jasmine Paolini	2	2
4	(United States) Jessica Pegula	7^{7}	5	6
WC	(Philippines) Alexandra Eala	6^{3}	7	3

Final
1	Aryna Sabalenka	7	6
4	(United States) Jessica Pegula	5	2

==== Doubles ====
Semifinals
1	(Czech Republic) Kateřina Siniaková (United States) Taylor Townsend	6	5	[2]
(Spain) Cristina Bucșa (Japan) Miyu Kato	2	7	[10]
Mirra Andreeva; Diana Shnaider	6	7
(China) Jiang Xinyu (Chinese Taipei) Wu Fang-hsien	0	5

Final
(Spain) Cristina Bucșa (Japan) Miyu Kato	3	7^{7}	[2]
Mirra Andreeva; Diana Shnaider	6	6^{5}	[10]

=== Madrid Open ===
==== Singles ====
Quarterfinals
1	Aryna Sabalenka	7^{7}	7^{9}
24	(Ukraine) Marta Kostyuk	6^{4}	6^{7}
(Japan) Moyuka Uchijima	2	1
17	(Ukraine) Elina Svitolina	6	6
7	Mirra Andreeva	5	1
4	(United States) Coco Gauff	7	6
5	(United States) Madison Keys	6	3	2
2	(Poland) Iga Świątek	0	6	6

Semifinals
1	Aryna Sabalenka	6	7
17	(Ukraine) Elina Svitolina	3	5
4	(United States) Coco Gauff	6	6
2	(Poland) Iga Świątek	1	1

Final
1	Aryna Sabalenka	6	7^{7}
4	(United States) Coco Gauff	3	6^{3}

==== Doubles ====
Semifinals
(Romania) Sorana Cîrstea; Anna Kalinskaya	7^{7}	6
3	(Chinese Taipei) Hsieh Su-wei (Latvia) Jeļena Ostapenko	6^{2}	4
WC	Victoria Azarenka (United States) Ashlyn Krueger	6	4	[8]
Veronika Kudermetova (Belgium) Elise Mertens	4	6	[10]

Final
(Romania) Sorana Cîrstea; Anna Kalinskaya	6^{10}	6	[12]
Veronika Kudermetova (Belgium) Elise Mertens	7^{12}	2	[10]

=== Italian Open ===
==== Singles ====
Quarterfinals
1	Aryna Sabalenka	4	3
8	(China) Zheng Qinwen	6	6
4	(United States) Coco Gauff	6	7^{7}
7	Mirra Andreeva	4	6^{5}
6	(Italy) Jasmine Paolini	6^{1}	6	6
13	Diana Shnaider	7^{7}	4	2
(United States) Peyton Stearns	6	4	7^{7}
16	(Ukraine) Elina Svitolina	2	6	6^{4}

Semifinals
8	(China) Zheng Qinwen	6^{3}	6	6^{4}
4	(United States) Coco Gauff	7^{7}	4	7^{7}
6	(Italy) Jasmine Paolini	7	6
(United States) Peyton Stearns	5	1

Final
4	(United States) Coco Gauff	4	2
6	(Italy) Jasmine Paolini	6	6

==== Doubles ====
Semifinals
6	Mirra Andreeva; Diana Shnaider	4	4
3	(Italy) Sara Errani (Italy) Jasmine Paolini	6	6
Veronika Kudermetova (Belgium) Elise Mertens	6	6
PR	(Australia) Storm Hunter (Australia) Ellen Perez	2	2

Final
3	(Italy) Sara Errani (Italy) Jasmine Paolini	6	7
Veronika Kudermetova (Belgium) Elise Mertens	4	5

=== Canadian Open ===
==== Singles ====
Quarterfinals
WC	(Canada) Victoria Mboko	6	6
(Spain) Jéssica Bouzas Maneiro	4	2
24	(Ukraine) Marta Kostyuk	1	1^{r}
9	(Kazakhstan) Elena Rybakina	6	2
10	(Ukraine) Elina Svitolina	2	2
(Japan) Naomi Osaka	6	6
6	(United States) Madison Keys	1	4
16	(Denmark) Clara Tauson	6	6

Semifinals
WC	(Canada) Victoria Mboko	1	7	7^{7}
9	(Kazakhstan) Elena Rybakina	6	5	6^{4}
(Japan) Naomi Osaka	6	7^{9}
16	(Denmark) Clara Tauson	2	6^{7}

Final
WC	(Canada) Victoria Mboko	2	6	6
(Japan) Naomi Osaka	6	4	1

==== Doubles ====
Semifinals
(United States) Coco Gauff (United States) McCartney Kessler	5	6	[10]
(Serbia) Olga Danilović (Chinese Taipei) Hsieh Su-wei	7	4	[6]
3	(United States) Taylor Townsend (China) Zhang Shuai	6	6
(United States) Caroline Dolehide (United States) Sofia Kenin	2	4

Final
(United States) Coco Gauff (United States) McCartney Kessler	6	1	[13]
3	(United States) Taylor Townsend (China) Zhang Shuai	4	6	[11]

=== Cincinnati Open ===
==== Singles ====
Quarterfinals
1	Aryna Sabalenka	1	4
9	(Kazakhstan) Elena Rybakina	6	6
3	(Poland) Iga Świątek	6	6
28	Anna Kalinskaya	3	4
Q	(France) Varvara Gracheva	1	2
Veronika Kudermetova	6	6
7	(Italy) Jasmine Paolini	2	6	6
2	(United States) Coco Gauff	6	4	3

Semifinals
9	(Kazakhstan) Elena Rybakina	5	3
3	(Poland) Iga Świątek	7	6
Veronika Kudermetova	3	7^{7}	3
7	(Italy) Jasmine Paolini	6	6^{2}	6

Final
3	(Poland) Iga Świątek	7	6
7	(Italy) Jasmine Paolini	5	4

==== Doubles ====
Semifinals
1	(Italy) Sara Errani (Italy) Jasmine Paolini	3	2
(China) Guo Hanyu; Alexandra Panova	6	6
6	(Ukraine) Lyudmyla Kichenok (Australia) Ellen Perez	6	3	[10]
2	(Canada) Gabriela Dabrowski (New Zealand) Erin Routliffe	3	6	[12]

Final
(China) Guo Hanyu; Alexandra Panova	4	3
2	(Canada) Gabriela Dabrowski (New Zealand) Erin Routliffe	6	6

=== China Open ===
==== Singles ====
Quarterfinals
16	(United States) Emma Navarro	7^{7}	2	1
5	(United States) Jessica Pegula	6^{2}	6	6
(United Kingdom) Sonay Kartal	3	4
26	(Czech Republic) Linda Nosková	6	6
6	(Italy) Jasmine Paolini	7^{7}	3	4
3	(United States) Amanda Anisimova	6^{4}	6	6
(Germany) Eva Lys	3	4
2	(United States) Coco Gauff	6	6

Semifinals
5	(United States) Jessica Pegula	3	6	6^{6}
26	(Czech Republic) Linda Nosková	6	1	7^{8}
3	(United States) Amanda Anisimova	6	6
2	(United States) Coco Gauff	1	2

Final
26	(Czech Republic) Linda Nosková	0	6	2
3	(United States) Amanda Anisimova	6	2	6

==== Doubles ====
Semifinals
WC	(Australia) Priscilla Hon (Czech Republic) Karolína Muchová
(Japan) Miyu Kato (Hungary) Fanny Stollár	w/o
4	(Chinese Taipei) Hsieh Su-wei (Latvia) Jeļena Ostapenko	4	0
2	(Italy) Sara Errani (Italy) Jasmine Paolini	6	6

Final
(Japan) Miyu Kato (Hungary) Fanny Stollár	7^{7}	3	[2]
2	(Italy) Sara Errani (Italy) Jasmine Paolini	6^{1}	6	[10]

=== Wuhan Open ===
==== Singles ====
Quarterfinals
1	Aryna Sabalenka	6	6
8	(Kazakhstan) Elena Rybakina	3	3
Q	(Czech Republic) Kateřina Siniaková	6	0	3
6	(United States) Jessica Pegula	2	6	6
(Germany) Laura Siegemund	3	0
3	(United States) Coco Gauff	6	6
7	(Italy) Jasmine Paolini	6	6
2	(Poland) Iga Świątek	1	2

Semifinals
1	Aryna Sabalenka	6	4	6^{2}
6	(United States) Jessica Pegula	2	6	7^{7}
3	(United States) Coco Gauff	6	6
7	(Italy) Jasmine Paolini	4	3

Final
6	(United States) Jessica Pegula	4	5
3	(United States) Coco Gauff	6	7

==== Doubles ====
Semifinals
8	(Kazakhstan) Anna Danilina (Serbia) Aleksandra Krunić	6	4	[11]
(Germany) Laura Siegemund (Hungary) Fanny Stollár	1	6	[9]
(Slovakia) Tereza Mihalíková (United Kingdom) Olivia Nicholls	3	0
(Australia) Storm Hunter (Czech Republic) Kateřina Siniaková	6	6

Final
8	(Kazakhstan) Anna Danilina (Serbia) Aleksandra Krunić	3	2
(Australia) Storm Hunter (Czech Republic) Kateřina Siniaková	6	6

== See also ==
- WTA 1000 tournaments
- 2025 WTA Tour
- 2025 ATP Tour Masters 1000
- 2025 ATP Tour
