= 2025 ATP Masters 1000 tournaments =

Men's professional tennis tour

2025 ATP Masters 1000
Details
- Duration: March 5 – November 2
- Edition: 36th
- Tournaments: 9

Achievements (singles)
- Most titles: (Spain) Carlos Alcaraz (3)
- Most finals: (Spain) Carlos Alcaraz (3)

The 2025 ATP Masters 1000 is the thirty-sixth edition of the ATP 1000 Series. The event series is named as such as the champions of each ATP 1000 event are awarded 1,000 rankings points.

== Tournaments ==
Tournament	Location	Surface	Draw	Date	Prize money
Indian Wells Open	Indian Wells, United States	Hard	96	Mar 5–16	$9,693,540
Miami Open	Miami Gardens, United States	Hard	96	Mar 19–30	$9,693,540
Monte-Carlo Masters	Roquebrune-Cap-Martin, France	Clay (red)	56	Apr 6–13	€6,128,940
Madrid Open	Madrid, Spain	Clay (red)	96	Apr 23 – May 4	€8,055,385
Italian Open	Rome, Italy	Clay (red)	96	May 7–18	€8,055,385
Canadian Open	Toronto, Canada	Hard	96	Jul 27 – Aug 7	$9,193,540
Cincinnati Open	Mason, United States	Hard	96	Aug 7–18	$9,193,540
Shanghai Masters	Shanghai, China	Hard	96	Oct 1–12	$9,193,540
Paris Masters	Paris, France	Hard (indoor)	56	Oct 27 – Nov 2	€6,128,940

== Results ==
* First-time champion

ATP Masters 1000	Singles champions	Runners-up	Score	Doubles champions	Runners-up	Score
Indian Wells Open Singles – Doubles	(United Kingdom) Jack Draper*	(Denmark) Holger Rune	6–2, 6–2	(El Salvador) Marcelo Arévalo (Croatia) Mate Pavić	(United States) Sebastian Korda (Australia) Jordan Thompson	6–3, 6–4
Miami Open Singles – Doubles	(Czech Republic) Jakub Menšík*	(Serbia) Novak Djokovic	7–6^{(7–4)}, 7–6^{(7–4)}	(El Salvador) Marcelo Arévalo (Croatia) Mate Pavić	(United Kingdom) Julian Cash (United Kingdom) Lloyd Glasspool	7–6^{(7–3)}, 6–3
Monte-Carlo Masters Singles – Doubles	(Spain) Carlos Alcaraz	(Italy) Lorenzo Musetti	3–6, 6–1, 6–0	(Monaco) Romain Arneodo* (France) Manuel Guinard*	(United Kingdom) Julian Cash (United Kingdom) Lloyd Glasspool	1–6, 7–6^{(10–8)}, [10–8]
Madrid Open Singles – Doubles	(Norway) Casper Ruud*	(United Kingdom) Jack Draper	7–5, 3–6, 6–4	(Spain) Marcel Granollers (Argentina) Horacio Zeballos	(El Salvador) Marcelo Arévalo (Croatia) Mate Pavić	6–4, 6–4
Italian Open Singles – Doubles	(Spain) Carlos Alcaraz	(Italy) Jannik Sinner	7–6^{(7–5)}, 6–1	(El Salvador) Marcelo Arévalo (Croatia) Mate Pavić	(France) Sadio Doumbia (France) Fabien Reboul	6–4, 6–7^{(6–8)}, [13–11]
Canadian Open Singles – Doubles	(United States) Ben Shelton*	Karen Khachanov	6–7^{(5–7)}, 6–4, 7–6^{(7–3)}	(United Kingdom) Julian Cash* (United Kingdom) Lloyd Glasspool*	(United Kingdom) Joe Salisbury (United Kingdom) Neal Skupski	6–3, 6–7^{(5–7)}, [13–11]
Cincinnati Open Singles – Doubles	(Spain) Carlos Alcaraz	(Italy) Jannik Sinner	5–0 (ret.)	(Croatia) Nikola Mektić (United States) Rajeev Ram	(Italy) Lorenzo Musetti (Italy) Lorenzo Sonego	4–6, 6–3, [10–5]
Shanghai Masters Singles – Doubles	(Monaco) Valentin Vacherot*	(France) Arthur Rinderknech	4–6, 6–3, 6–3	(Germany) Kevin Krawietz*	(Sweden) André Göransson (United States) Alex Michelsen	6–4, 6–4
Shanghai Masters Singles – Doubles	(Monaco) Valentin Vacherot*	(France) Arthur Rinderknech	4–6, 6–3, 6–3	(Germany) Tim Pütz	(Sweden) André Göransson (United States) Alex Michelsen	6–4, 6–4
Paris Masters Singles – Doubles	(Italy) Jannik Sinner	(Canada) Félix Auger-Aliassime	6–4, 7–6^{(7–4)}	(Finland) Harri Heliövaara* (United Kingdom) Henry Patten*	(United Kingdom) Julian Cash (United Kingdom) Lloyd Glasspool	6–3, 6–4

== Tournament details ==
Key

- Q = Qualifier
- WC = Wild card
- LL = Lucky loser
- Alt = Alternate
- ITF = ITF entry
- PR = Protected ranking
- SR = Special ranking
- SE = Special exempt
- JE = Junior exempt
- JR = Junior Accelerator Programme entrant
- CO = College Accelerator Programme entrant
- NG = Next Gen Accelerator Program entrant
- w/o = Walkover
- r = Retired
- d = Defaulted

=== Indian Wells Open ===
==== Singles ====
Quarterfinals
(Netherlands) Tallon Griekspoor	7	0	3
12	(Denmark) Holger Rune	5	6	6
20	(France) Arthur Fils	4	6	6^{7}
5	Daniil Medvedev	6	2	7^{9}
11	(United States) Ben Shelton	4	5
13	(United Kingdom) Jack Draper	6	7
25	(Argentina) Francisco Cerúndolo	3	6^{4}
2	(Spain) Carlos Alcaraz	6	7^{7}

Semifinals
12	(Denmark) Holger Rune	7	6
5	Daniil Medvedev	5	4
13	(United Kingdom) Jack Draper	6	0	6
2	(Spain) Carlos Alcaraz	1	6	4

Final
12	(Denmark) Holger Rune	2	2
13	(United Kingdom) Jack Draper	6	6

==== Doubles ====
Semifinals
1	(El Salvador) Marcelo Arévalo (Croatia) Mate Pavić	6	6
WC	(United States) Christian Harrison (United States) Evan King	3	4
(United States) Sebastian Korda (Australia) Jordan Thompson	3	6	[10]
Alt	(Brazil) Fernando Romboli (Australia) John-Patrick Smith	6	3	[8]

Final
1	(El Salvador) Marcelo Arévalo (Croatia) Mate Pavić	6	6
(United States) Sebastian Korda (Australia) Jordan Thompson	3	4

=== Miami Open ===
==== Singles ====
Quarterfinals
17	(France) Arthur Fils	6^{5}	1
(Czech Republic) Jakub Menšík	7^{7}	6
3	(United States) Taylor Fritz	7	6^{7}	7
29	(Italy) Matteo Berrettini	5	7^{9}	5
24	(United States) Sebastian Korda	3	6^{4}
4	(Serbia) Novak Djokovic	6	7^{7}
23	(Argentina) Francisco Cerúndolo	7^{8}	4	6^{3}
14	(Bulgaria) Grigor Dimitrov	6^{6}	6	7^{7}

Semifinals
(Czech Republic) Jakub Menšík	7^{7}	4	7^{7}
3	(United States) Taylor Fritz	6^{4}	6	6^{4}
4	(Serbia) Novak Djokovic	6	6
14	(Bulgaria) Grigor Dimitrov	2	3

Final
(Czech Republic) Jakub Menšík	7^{7}	7^{7}
4	(Serbia) Novak Djokovic	6^{4}	6^{4}

==== Doubles ====
Semifinals
1	(El Salvador) Marcelo Arévalo (Croatia) Mate Pavić	2	7^{7}	[10]
5	(Croatia) Nikola Mektić (New Zealand) Michael Venus	6	6^{4}	[5]
6	(United Kingdom) Julian Cash (United Kingdom) Lloyd Glasspool	7^{9}	7^{7}
2	(Finland) Harri Heliövaara (United Kingdom) Henry Patten	6^{7}	6^{5}

Final
1	(El Salvador) Marcelo Arévalo (Croatia) Mate Pavić	7^{7}	6
6	(United Kingdom) Julian Cash (United Kingdom) Lloyd Glasspool	6^{3}	3

=== Monte-Carlo Masters ===
==== Singles ====
Quarterfinals
13	(Italy) Lorenzo Musetti	1	6	6
6	(Greece) Stefanos Tsitsipas	6	3	4
15	(Bulgaria) Grigor Dimitrov	0	0
8	(Australia) Alex de Minaur	6	6
(Spain) Alejandro Davidovich Fokina	6	6
(Australia) Alexei Popyrin	3	2
12	(France) Arthur Fils	6	5	3
2	(Spain) Carlos Alcaraz	4	7	6

Semifinals
13	(Italy) Lorenzo Musetti	1	6	7^{7}
8	(Australia) Alex de Minaur	6	4	6^{4}
(Spain) Alejandro Davidovich Fokina	6^{2}	4
2	(Spain) Carlos Alcaraz	7^{7}	6

Final
13	(Italy) Lorenzo Musetti	6	1	0
2	(Spain) Carlos Alcaraz	3	6	6

==== Doubles ====
Semifinals
1	(El Salvador) Marcelo Arévalo (Croatia) Mate Pavić	6^{2}	7^{7}	[6]
7	(United Kingdom) Julian Cash (United Kingdom) Lloyd Glasspool	7^{7}	6^{5}	[10]
WC	(Monaco) Romain Arneodo (France) Manuel Guinard	6	7
2	(Finland) Harri Heliövaara (United Kingdom) Henry Patten	4	5

Final
7	(United Kingdom) Julian Cash (United Kingdom) Lloyd Glasspool	6	6^{8}	[8]
WC	(Monaco) Romain Arneodo (France) Manuel Guinard	1	7^{10}	[10]

=== Madrid Open ===
==== Singles ====
Quarterfinals
20	(Argentina) Francisco Cerúndolo	3	7^{7}	6
22	(Czech Republic) Jakub Menšík	6	6^{5}	2
14	(Norway) Casper Ruud	6	7
9	Daniil Medvedev	3	5
5	(United Kingdom) Jack Draper	6	6
(Italy) Matteo Arnaldi	0	4
10	(Italy) Lorenzo Musetti	6	6
LL	(Canada) Gabriel Diallo	4	3

Semifinals
20	(Argentina) Francisco Cerúndolo	4	5
14	(Norway) Casper Ruud	6	7
5	(United Kingdom) Jack Draper	6	7^{7}
10	(Italy) Lorenzo Musetti	3	6^{4}

Final
14	(Norway) Casper Ruud	7	3	6
5	(United Kingdom) Jack Draper	5	6	4

==== Doubles ====
Semifinals
1	(El Salvador) Marcelo Arévalo (Croatia) Mate Pavić	6^{8}	7	[10]
(United States) Christian Harrison (United States) Evan King	7^{10}	5	[6]
3	(Germany) Kevin Krawietz (Germany) Tim Pütz	6^{6}	5
5	(Spain) Marcel Granollers (Argentina) Horacio Zeballos	7^{8}	7

Final
1	(El Salvador) Marcelo Arévalo (Croatia) Mate Pavić	4	4
5	(Spain) Marcel Granollers (Argentina) Horacio Zeballos	6	6

=== Italian Open ===
==== Singles ====
Quarterfinals
1	(Italy) Jannik Sinner	6	6
6	(Norway) Casper Ruud	0	1
30	(Poland) Hubert Hurkacz	6^{4}	3
11	(United States) Tommy Paul	7^{7}	6
5	(United Kingdom) Jack Draper	4	4
3	(Spain) Carlos Alcaraz	6	6
8	(Italy) Lorenzo Musetti	7^{7}	6
2	(Germany) Alexander Zverev	6^{1}	4

Semifinals
1	(Italy) Jannik Sinner	1	6	6
11	(United States) Tommy Paul	6	0	3
3	(Spain) Carlos Alcaraz	6	7^{7}
8	(Italy) Lorenzo Musetti	3	6^{4}

Final
1	(Italy) Jannik Sinner	6^{5}	1
3	(Spain) Carlos Alcaraz	7^{7}	6

==== Doubles ====
Semifinals
1	(El Salvador) Marcelo Arévalo (Croatia) Mate Pavić	7^{7}	6
(United Kingdom) Joe Salisbury (United Kingdom) Neal Skupski	6^{2}	1
(France) Sadio Doumbia (France) Fabien Reboul	7^{7}	6
2	(Finland) Harri Heliövaara (United Kingdom) Henry Patten	6^{5}	4

Final
1	(El Salvador) Marcelo Arévalo (Croatia) Mate Pavić	6	6^{6}	[13]
(France) Sadio Doumbia (France) Fabien Reboul	4	7^{8}	[11]

=== Canadian Open ===
==== Singles ====
Quarterfinals
1	(Germany) Alexander Zverev	6^{8}	6	6
18	(Australia) Alexei Popyrin	7^{10}	4	3
26	(United States) Alex Michelsen	4	6^{3}
11	Karen Khachanov	6	7^{7}
9	(Australia) Alex de Minaur	3	4
4	(United States) Ben Shelton	6	6
6	Andrey Rublev	3	6^{4}
2	(United States) Taylor Fritz	6	7^{7}

Semifinals
1	(Germany) Alexander Zverev	3	6	6^{4}
11	Karen Khachanov	6	4	7^{7}
4	(United States) Ben Shelton	6	6
2	(United States) Taylor Fritz	4	3

Final
11	Karen Khachanov	7^{7}	4	6^{3}
4	(United States) Ben Shelton	6^{5}	6	7^{7}

==== Doubles ====
Semifinals
6	(United Kingdom) Joe Salisbury (United Kingdom) Neal Skupski	7^{7}	6
(Argentina) Máximo González (Argentina) Andrés Molteni	6^{5}	2
4	(Germany) Kevin Krawietz (Germany) Tim Pütz	3	6^{2}
2	(United Kingdom) Julian Cash (United Kingdom) Lloyd Glasspool	6	7^{7}

Final
6	(United Kingdom) Joe Salisbury (United Kingdom) Neal Skupski	3	7^{7}	[11]
2	(United Kingdom) Julian Cash (United Kingdom) Lloyd Glasspool	6	6^{5}	[13]

=== Cincinnati Open ===
==== Singles ====
Quarterfinals
1	(Italy) Jannik Sinner	6	6
23	(Canada) Félix Auger-Aliassime	0	2
Q	(France) Térence Atmane	6	6
7	(Denmark) Holger Rune	2	3
5	(United States) Ben Shelton	2	2
3	(Germany) Alexander Zverev	6	6
9	Andrey Rublev	3	6	5
2	(Spain) Carlos Alcaraz	6	4	7

Semifinals
1	(Italy) Jannik Sinner	7^{7}	6
Q	(France) Térence Atmane	6^{4}	2
3	(Germany) Alexander Zverev	4	3
2	(Spain) Carlos Alcaraz	6	6

Final
1	(Italy) Jannik Sinner	0^{r}
2	(Spain) Carlos Alcaraz	5

==== Doubles ====
Semifinals
5	(United Kingdom) Joe Salisbury (United Kingdom) Neal Skupski	6	3	[11]
(Italy) Lorenzo Musetti (Italy) Lorenzo Sonego	4	6	[13]
(Croatia) Nikola Mektić (United States) Rajeev Ram	7^{7}	7^{7}
2	(United Kingdom) Julian Cash (United Kingdom) Lloyd Glasspool	6^{4}	6^{2}

Final
(Italy) Lorenzo Musetti (Italy) Lorenzo Sonego	6	3	[5]
(Croatia) Nikola Mektić (United States) Rajeev Ram	4	6	[10]

=== Shanghai Masters ===
==== Singles ====
Quarterfinals
16	Daniil Medvedev	6	6
7	(Australia) Alex de Minaur	4	4
(France) Arthur Rinderknech	6	6
12	(Canada) Félix Auger-Aliassime	3	4
(Belgium) Zizou Bergs	3	5
4	(Serbia) Novak Djokovic	6	7
10	(Denmark) Holger Rune	6	6^{4}	4
Q	(Monaco) Valentin Vacherot	2	7^{7}	6

Semifinals
16	Daniil Medvedev	6	2	4
(France) Arthur Rinderknech	4	6	6
4	(Serbia) Novak Djokovic	3	4
Q	(Monaco) Valentin Vacherot	6	6

Final
(France) Arthur Rinderknech	6	3	3
Q	(Monaco) Valentin Vacherot	4	6	6

==== Doubles ====
Semifinals
1	(El Salvador) Marcelo Arévalo (Croatia) Mate Pavić	6^{2}	6	[7]
(Sweden) André Göransson (United States) Alex Michelsen	7^{7}	2	[10]
3	(Germany) Kevin Krawietz (Germany) Tim Pütz	6	7^{10}
Alt	(Argentina) Guido Andreozzi (France) Manuel Guinard	3	6^{8}

Final
(Sweden) André Göransson (United States) Alex Michelsen	4	4
3	(Germany) Kevin Krawietz (Germany) Tim Pütz	6	6

=== Paris Masters ===
==== Singles ====
Quarterfinals
WC	(Monaco) Valentin Vacherot	2	2
9	(Canada) Félix Auger-Aliassime	6	6
13	(Kazakhstan) Alexander Bublik	6^{5}	6	7
6	(Australia) Alex de Minaur	7^{7}	4	5
11	Daniil Medvedev	6	3	6^{5}
3	(Germany) Alexander Zverev	2	6	7^{7}
5	(United States) Ben Shelton	3	3
2	(Italy) Jannik Sinner	6	6

Semifinals
9	(Canada) Félix Auger-Aliassime	7^{7}	6
13	(Kazakhstan) Alexander Bublik	6^{3}	4
3	(Germany) Alexander Zverev	0	1
2	(Italy) Jannik Sinner	6	6

Final
9	(Canada) Félix Auger-Aliassime	4	6^{4}
2	(Italy) Jannik Sinner	6	7^{7}

==== Doubles ====
Semifinals
WC	(France) Quentin Halys (France) Pierre-Hugues Herbert	3	4
3	(Finland) Harri Heliövaara (United Kingdom) Henry Patten	6	6
(Portugal) Francisco Cabral (Austria) Lucas Miedler	4	7	[7]
2	(United Kingdom) Julian Cash (United Kingdom) Lloyd Glasspool	6	5	[10]

Final
3	(Finland) Harri Heliövaara (United Kingdom) Henry Patten	6	6
2	(United Kingdom) Julian Cash (United Kingdom) Lloyd Glasspool	3	4

== See also ==
- ATP Tour Masters 1000
- ATP Tour
- 2025 WTA 1000 tournaments
- WTA Tour
