= 2025 Cincinnati Open – Women's doubles =

Women's doubles
- 2025 Cincinnati Open

Final
- Champions: (Canada) Gabriela Dabrowski (New Zealand) Erin Routliffe
- Runners-up: (China) Guo Hanyu; Alexandra Panova
- Score: 6–4, 6–3

Details
- Draw: 32 (3 WC )
- Seeds: 8

Events
Singles	men	women
Doubles	men	women
- Cincinnati Open

Defending champion Erin Routliffe and her partner Gabriela Dabrowski defeated Guo Hanyu and Alexandra Panova in the final, 6–4, 6–3 to win the women's doubles tennis title at the 2025 Cincinnati Open.

Asia Muhammad and Routliffe were the defending champions, but chose not to compete together this year. Muhammad partnered Demi Schuurs, but lost in the second round to Guo and Panova.

Taylor Townsend retained the WTA No. 1 doubles ranking after Jeļena Ostapenko withdrew from the quarterfinals.

== Seeds ==
1. (Italy) Sara Errani / (Italy) Jasmine Paolini (semifinals)
2. (Canada) Gabriela Dabrowski / (New Zealand) Erin Routliffe (champions)
3. (United States) Taylor Townsend / (China) Zhang Shuai (first round)
4. Veronika Kudermetova / (Belgium) Elise Mertens (second round)
5. (United States) Asia Muhammad / (Netherlands) Demi Schuurs (second round)
6. (Ukraine) Lyudmyla Kichenok / (Australia) Ellen Perez (semifinals)
7. (Hungary) Tímea Babos / (Brazil) Luisa Stefani (second round)
8. (Chinese Taipei) Chan Hao-ching / (China) Jiang Xinyu (first round)

== Draw ==
Key

- Q = Qualifier
- WC = Wild card
- LL = Lucky loser
- Alt = Alternate
- ITF = ITF entry
- PR = Protected ranking
- SR = Special ranking
- SE = Special exempt
- JE = Junior exempt
- JR = Junior Accelerator Programme entrant
- CO = College Accelerator Programme entrant
- NG = Next Gen Accelerator Program entrant
- w/o = Walkover
- r = Retired
- d = Defaulted

=== Finals ===
Semifinals
1	(Italy) Sara Errani (Italy) Jasmine Paolini	3	2
(China) Guo Hanyu; Alexandra Panova	6	6
6	(Ukraine) Lyudmyla Kichenok (Australia) Ellen Perez	6	3	[10]
2	(Canada) Gabriela Dabrowski (New Zealand) Erin Routliffe	3	6	[12]

Final
(China) Guo Hanyu; Alexandra Panova	4	3
2	(Canada) Gabriela Dabrowski (New Zealand) Erin Routliffe	6	6

=== Top half ===
First round
1	(Italy) S Errani (Italy) J Paolini	6	7^{7}
Alt	(Serbia) O Danilović; A Potapova	3	6^{4}
(Poland) M Linette (Denmark) C Tauson	4	6	[10]
(Slovakia) T Mihalíková (United Kingdom) O Nicholls	6	2	[7]
(United States) P Stearns (Czech Republic) M Vondroušová	6	7
(Hungary) F Stollár (Chinese Taipei) F-h Wu	4	5
PR	(China) Y Xu (China) Z Yang	7^{7}	3	[4]
7	(Hungary) T Babos (Brazil) L Stefani	6^{2}	6	[10]
4	V Kudermetova (Belgium) E Mertens	6	6^{5}	[12]
Alt	(Romania) J Cristian (Romania) E-G Ruse	4	7^{7}	[10]
WC	(Czech Republic) B Krejčíková (Latvia) J Ostapenko	4	6	[10]
(Kazakhstan) A Danilina (Serbia) A Krunić	6	2	[8]
(China) H Guo; A Panova	5	6	[10]
PR	(Japan) M Kato (Kazakhstan) G Voskoboeva	7	0	[5]
PR	(Australia) S Hunter (United States) D Krawczyk	5	6	[4]
5	(United States) A Muhammad (Netherlands) D Schuurs	7	2	[10]

Second round
1	(Italy) S Errani (Italy) J Paolini	w/o
(Poland) M Linette (Denmark) C Tauson
(United States) P Stearns (Czech Republic) M Vondroušová	6	6
7	(Hungary) T Babos (Brazil) L Stefani	3	3
4	V Kudermetova (Belgium) E Mertens	3	6	[5]
WC	(Czech Republic) B Krejčíková (Latvia) J Ostapenko	6	1	[10]
(China) H Guo; A Panova	6	3	[10]
5	(United States) A Muhammad (Netherlands) D Schuurs	1	6	[7]

Quarterfinals
1	(Italy) S Errani (Italy) J Paolini	6	6
(United States) P Stearns (Czech Republic) M Vondroušová	4	3
WC	(Czech Republic) B Krejčíková (Latvia) J Ostapenko
(China) H Guo; A Panova	w/o

Semifinals
1	(Italy) S Errani (Italy) J Paolini	3	2
(China) H Guo; A Panova	6	6

=== Bottom half ===
First round
6	(Ukraine) L Kichenok (Australia) E Perez	7	7
(Romania) S Cîrstea; A Kalinskaya	5	5
WC	(United States) I Jovic (United States) A Krueger	2	2
(United States) H Baptiste (United States) J Pegula	6	6
E Alexandrova (Australia) D Kasatkina	6	2	[9]
I Khromacheva; K Rakhimova	3	6	[11]
(United States) N Melichar-Martinez; L Samsonova	6	7
3	(United States) T Townsend (China) S Zhang	3	5
8	(Chinese Taipei) H-c Chan (China) X Jiang	2	6^{4}
(Japan) S Aoyama (Spain) C Bucșa	6	7^{7}
(United States) C McNally (Czech Republic) L Nosková	7	6
(Norway) U Eikeri (Japan) E Hozumi	5	3
WC	(United States) E Navarro (United States) M Navarro	2	3
(Mexico) G Olmos (Indonesia) A Sutjiadi	6	6
(Chinese Taipei) S-w Hsieh (Japan) E Shibahara	5	5
2	(Canada) G Dabrowski (New Zealand) E Routliffe	7	7

Second round
6	(Ukraine) L Kichenok (Australia) E Perez	6	7
(United States) H Baptiste (United States) J Pegula	4	5
I Khromacheva; K Rakhimova	3	6^{3}
(United States) N Melichar-Martinez; L Samsonova	6	7^{7}
(Japan) S Aoyama (Spain) C Bucșa	6^{2}	6	[11]
(United States) C McNally (Czech Republic) L Nosková	7^{7}	3	[13]
(Mexico) G Olmos (Indonesia) A Sutjiadi	6	6^{2}	[7]
2	(Canada) G Dabrowski (New Zealand) E Routliffe	3	7^{7}	[10]

Quarterfinals
6	(Ukraine) L Kichenok (Australia) E Perez	6	6
(United States) N Melichar-Martinez; L Samsonova	4	1
(United States) C McNally (Czech Republic) L Nosková	2	6^{3}
2	(Canada) G Dabrowski (New Zealand) E Routliffe	6	7^{7}

Semifinals
6	(Ukraine) L Kichenok (Australia) E Perez	6	3	[10]
2	(Canada) G Dabrowski (New Zealand) E Routliffe	3	6	[12]

=== Seeded teams ===
The following are the seeded teams. Seedings are based on WTA rankings as of 28 July 2025.

Country	Player	Country	Player	Rank	Seed
ITA	Sara Errani	ITA	Jasmine Paolini	12	1
CAN	Gabriela Dabrowski	NZL	Erin Routliffe	12	2
USA	Taylor Townsend	CHN	Zhang Shuai	13	3
	Veronika Kudermetova	BEL	Elise Mertens	19	4
USA	Asia Muhammad	NED	Demi Schuurs	29	5
UKR	Lyudmyla Kichenok	AUS	Ellen Perez	35	6
HUN	Tímea Babos	BRA	Luisa Stefani	45	7
TPE	Chan Hao-ching	CHN	Jiang Xinyu	48	8

== Other entry information ==
=== Wildcards ===
- (United States) Iva Jovic / (United States) Ashlyn Krueger
- (Czech Republic) Barbora Krejčíková / (Latvia) Jeļena Ostapenko
- (United States) Emma Navarro / (United States) Margaret Navarro

=== Protected ranking ===
- (Australia) Storm Hunter / (United States) Desirae Krawczyk
- (Japan) Miyu Kato / (Kazakhstan) Galina Voskoboeva
- (China) Xu Yifan / (China) Yang Zhaoxuan

=== Alternates ===
- (Romania) Jaqueline Cristian / (Romania) Elena-Gabriela Ruse
- (Serbia) Olga Danilović / Anastasia Potapova

=== Withdrawals ===
- ‡ Mirra Andreeva / Diana Shnaider → replaced by (Mexico) Giuliana Olmos / (Indonesia) Aldila Sutjiadi
- § (United States) Caroline Dolehide / (United States) Sofia Kenin → replaced by (Serbia) Olga Danilović / Anastasia Potapova
- § (Brazil) Beatriz Haddad Maia / (Germany) Laura Siegemund → replaced by (Romania) Jaqueline Cristian / (Romania) Elena-Gabriela Ruse
- ‡ (Slovenia) Andreja Klepač / (Romania) Monica Niculescu → replaced by (Romania) Sorana Cîrstea / Anna Kalinskaya

‡ – withdrew from entry list
§ – withdrew from main draw
