= 2025 Cincinnati Open – Men's singles =

Tennis championship

Men's singles
- 2025 Cincinnati Open

Final
- Champion: (Spain) Carlos Alcaraz
- Runner-up: (Italy) Jannik Sinner
- Score: 5–0 ret.

Details
- Draw: 96
- Seeds: 32

Events
Singles	men	women
Doubles	men	women
- Cincinnati Open

Carlos Alcaraz won the men's singles tennis title at the 2025 Cincinnati Open after defending champion Jannik Sinner retired in the final, with the score at 5–0. It was his eighth ATP 1000 title and 22nd ATP Tour title overall. Alcaraz was the youngest man to win in Cincinnati since Andy Murray in 2008. This was the first time since 2011 that the final ended in a retirement.

Térence Atmane was the first qualifier to reach the tournament's semifinals since Alexandr Dolgopolov in 2015.

== Seeds ==
All seeds receive a bye into the second round.

1. (Italy) Jannik Sinner (final, retired)
2. (Spain) Carlos Alcaraz (champion)
3. (Germany) Alexander Zverev (semifinals)
4. (United States) Taylor Fritz (fourth round)
5. (United States) Ben Shelton (quarterfinals)
6. (Australia) Alex de Minaur (second round)
7. (Denmark) Holger Rune (quarterfinals)
8. (Italy) Lorenzo Musetti (second round)
9. Andrey Rublev (quarterfinals)
10. (United States) Frances Tiafoe (fourth round, retired)
11. (Norway) Casper Ruud (second round)
12. Daniil Medvedev (second round)
13. (United States) Tommy Paul (third round)
14. Karen Khachanov (fourth round, retired)
15. (Italy) Flavio Cobolli (second round)
16. (Czech Republic) Jakub Menšík (third round, retired)
17. (Spain) Alejandro Davidovich Fokina (second round, retired)
18. (France) Arthur Fils (withdrew)
19. (Czech Republic) Tomáš Macháč (second round)
20. (France) Ugo Humbert (third round)
21. (Australia) Alexei Popyrin (third round)
22. (Czech Republic) Jiří Lehečka (fourth round)
23. (Canada) Félix Auger-Aliassime (quarterfinals)
24. (Canada) Denis Shapovalov (second round)
25. (Greece) Stefanos Tsitsipas (third round)
26. (Netherlands) Tallon Griekspoor (second round)
27. (United States) Brandon Nakashima (third round)
28. (United States) Alex Michelsen (third round)
29. (Italy) Luciano Darderi (second round, retired)
30. (Canada) Gabriel Diallo (third round)
31. (Italy) Lorenzo Sonego (third round)
32. (United Kingdom) Cameron Norrie (second round)

Click on the seed number of a player to go to their draw section.

== Draw ==
Key

- Q = Qualifier
- WC = Wild card
- LL = Lucky loser
- Alt = Alternate
- ITF = ITF entry
- PR = Protected ranking
- SR = Special ranking
- SE = Special exempt
- JE = Junior exempt
- JR = Junior Accelerator Programme entrant
- CO = College Accelerator Programme entrant
- NG = Next Gen Accelerator Program entrant
- w/o = Walkover
- r = Retired
- d = Defaulted

=== Finals ===
Quarterfinals
1	(Italy) Jannik Sinner	6	6
23	(Canada) Félix Auger-Aliassime	0	2
Q	(France) Térence Atmane	6	6
7	(Denmark) Holger Rune	2	3
5	(United States) Ben Shelton	2	2
3	(Germany) Alexander Zverev	6	6
9	Andrey Rublev	3	6	5
2	(Spain) Carlos Alcaraz	6	4	7

Semifinals
1	(Italy) Jannik Sinner	7^{7}	6
Q	(France) Térence Atmane	6^{4}	2
3	(Germany) Alexander Zverev	4	3
2	(Spain) Carlos Alcaraz	6	6

Final
1	(Italy) Jannik Sinner	0^{r}
2	(Spain) Carlos Alcaraz	5

=== Top half ===
==== Section 1 ====
First round
Q	(Colombia) DE Galán	6	6
(Czech Republic) V Kopřiva	2	4
(Argentina) S Báez	6	6
(Belgium) D Goffin	1	3
(Australia) J Thompson	2	2
Q	(France) A Mannarino	6	6
(Spain) P Martínez	1	6	6
WC	(Chile) N Jarry	6	4	3

Second round
1	(Italy) J Sinner	6	6
Q	(Colombia) DE Galán	1	1
(Argentina) S Báez	5	4
30	(Canada) G Diallo	7	6
19	(Czech Republic) T Macháč	3	3
Q	(France) A Mannarino	6	6
(Spain) P Martínez	2	2
13	(United States) T Paul	6	6

Third round
1	(Italy) J Sinner	6	7^{8}
30	(Canada) G Diallo	2	6^{6}
Q	(France) A Mannarino	5	6	6
13	(United States) T Paul	7	3	4

Fourth round
1	(Italy) J Sinner	6	7^{7}
Q	(France) A Mannarino	4	6^{4}

==== Section 2 ====
First round
(France) A Rinderknech	6	6
(Portugal) N Borges	3	3
(Argentina) TM Etcheverry	6^{5}	7^{7}	6
(China) J Shang	7^{7}	6^{4}	4
Q	(United States) C Smith	1	6	4
(Hungary) F Marozsán	6	4	6
(France) B Bonzi	6^{1}	6	6
(Italy) M Arnaldi	7^{7}	3	4

Second round
11	(Norway) C Ruud	7^{7}	4	2
(France) A Rinderknech	6^{5}	6	6
(Argentina) TM Etcheverry	2	6^{3}
23	(Canada) F Auger-Aliassime	6	7^{7}
25	(Greece) S Tsitsipas	7^{7}	6
(Hungary) F Marozsán	6^{3}	2
(France) B Bonzi	5	6	7^{7}
8	(Italy) L Musetti	7	4	6^{4}

Third round
(France) A Rinderknech	6^{4}	2^{r}
23	(Canada) F Auger-Aliassime	7^{7}	4
25	(Greece) S Tsitsipas	7^{7}	3	4
(France) B Bonzi	6^{4}	6	6

Fourth round
23	(Canada) F Auger-Aliassime	6	6
(France) B Bonzi	4	3

==== Section 3 ====
First round
(Croatia) B Ćorić	3	5
Q	(United States) E Nava	6	7
(Belgium) Z Bergs	6	6
(United Kingdom) J Fearnley	1	4
(Brazil) J Fonseca	4	6	7
(China) Y Bu	6	2	5
Q	(France) T Atmane	6	6
(Japan) Y Nishioka	2	2

Second round
4	(United States) T Fritz	6	6
Q	(United States) E Nava	4	4
(Belgium) Z Bergs	3	6^{4}
31	(Italy) L Sonego	6	7^{7}
17	(Spain) A Davidovich Fokina	7^{7}	4^{r}
(Brazil) J Fonseca	6^{4}	5
Q	(France) T Atmane	6	3	7^{7}
15	(Italy) F Cobolli	4	6	6^{5}

Third round
4	(United States) T Fritz	7^{7}	7
31	(Italy) L Sonego	6^{4}	5
(Brazil) J Fonseca	3	4
Q	(France) T Atmane	6	6

Fourth round
4	(United States) T Fritz	6	5	3
Q	(France) T Atmane	3	7	6

==== Section 4 ====
First round
(Spain) R Carballés Baena	6	5	6
(France) H Gaston	4	7	3
(France) G Mpetshi Perricard	3	2
Q	(Hong Kong) C Wong	6	6
(France) C Moutet	7	6
(United States) M McDonald	5	3
R Safiullin	6	6
(Chile) A Tabilo	3	3

Second round
10	(United States) F Tiafoe	6	6
(Spain) R Carballés Baena	4	3
Q	(Hong Kong) C Wong	3	4
20	(France) U Humbert	6	6
28	(United States) A Michelsen	3	6	6
(France) C Moutet	6	3	4
R Safiullin	5	6^{5}
7	(Denmark) H Rune	7	7^{7}

Third round
10	(United States) F Tiafoe	6	6
20	(France) U Humbert	4	4
28	(United States) A Michelsen	6^{4}	3
7	(Denmark) H Rune	7^{7}	6

Fourth round
10	(United States) F Tiafoe	4	1^{r}
7	(Denmark) H Rune	6	3

=== Bottom half ===
==== Section 5 ====
First round
(Argentina) C Ugo Carabelli	7	6
(Japan) K Nishikori	5	3
(Germany) D Altmaier	6^{5}	6^{1}
(Spain) R Bautista Agut	7^{7}	7^{7}
WC	(United States) T Boyer	6	7^{7}
WC	(United States) B Holt	3	6^{3}
(Australia) A Walton	4	7^{7}	6
LL	(Argentina) M Navone	6	6^{3}	1

Second round
5	(United States) B Shelton	6	3
(Argentina) C Ugo Carabelli	3	1^{r}
(Spain) R Bautista Agut	6	6
32	(United Kingdom) C Norrie	4	3
22	(Czech Republic) J Lehečka	4	6	6
WC	(United States) T Boyer	6	1	4
(Australia) A Walton	6^{0}	6	6
12	D Medvedev	7^{7}	4	1

Third round
5	(United States) B Shelton	7^{7}	6
(Spain) R Bautista Agut	6^{3}	3
22	(Czech Republic) J Lehečka	7^{7}	7^{7}
(Australia) A Walton	6^{5}	6^{3}

Fourth round
5	(United States) B Shelton	6	6
22	(Czech Republic) J Lehečka	4	4

==== Section 6 ====
First round
PR	(Austria) S Ofner	7	3	3
Q	(France) V Royer	5	6	6
WC	(United States) J Brooksby	7^{7}	5	6
(France) A Müller	6^{2}	7	1
(United States) M Giron	2	6	3
Q	(Belgium) A Blockx	6	3	6
LL	(Australia) A Vukic	6^{5}	5
WC	(United States) N Basavareddy	7^{7}	7

Second round
14	K Khachanov	6	7^{8}
Q	(France) V Royer	4	6^{6}
WC	(United States) J Brooksby	7	6
LL	(France) A Cazaux	5	1
27	(United States) B Nakashima	4	6	7^{7}
Q	(Belgium) A Blockx	6	3	6^{5}
WC	(United States) N Basavareddy	3	3
3	(Germany) A Zverev	6	6

Third round
14	K Khachanov	6	6
WC	(United States) J Brooksby	3	3
27	(United States) B Nakashima	4	4
3	(Germany) A Zverev	6	6

Fourth round
14	K Khachanov	5	0^{r}
3	(Germany) A Zverev	7	3

==== Section 7 ====
First round
(Bolivia) H Dellien	5	6^{3}
(United States) R Opelka	7	7^{7}
(Argentina) F Comesaña	6	6
(Spain) J Munar	4	4
Q	(Spain) M Landaluce	3	6	6
Q	(United States) P Kypson	6	3	2
(United States) L Tien	6	6
Q	(Switzerland) L Riedi	3	4

Second round
6	(Australia) A de Minaur	6^{6}	4
(United States) R Opelka	7^{8}	6
(Argentina) F Comesaña	6	3
29	(Italy) L Darderi	4	1^{r}
21	(Australia) A Popyrin	7^{7}	6
Q	(Spain) M Landaluce	6^{3}	3
(United States) L Tien	6^{4}	3
9	A Rublev	7^{7}	6

Third round
(United States) R Opelka	7^{7}	4	5
(Argentina) F Comesaña	6^{4}	6	7
21	(Australia) A Popyrin	7^{7}	6^{5}	5
9	A Rublev	6^{5}	7^{7}	7

Fourth round
(Argentina) F Comesaña	2	3
9	A Rublev	6	6

==== Section 8 ====
First round
(Serbia) M Kecmanović	6^{5}	4
(United States) E Quinn	7^{7}	6
LL	(Italy) L Nardi	6	7^{7}
Q	(Argentina) TA Tirante	4	6^{5}
(Serbia) H Medjedovic	6	6
(United States) A Kovacevic	2	3
(Italy) M Bellucci	6^{7}	6^{5}
(Bosnia and Herzegovina) D Džumhur	7^{9}	7^{7}

Second round
16	(Czech Republic) J Menšík	6	6
(United States) E Quinn	4	2
LL	(Italy) L Nardi	6^{5}	6	6
24	(Canada) D Shapovalov	7^{7}	3	4
26	(Netherlands) T Griekspoor	4	6^{3}
(Serbia) H Medjedovic	6	7^{7}
(Bosnia and Herzegovina) D Džumhur	1	6	3
2	(Spain) C Alcaraz	6	2	6

Third round
16	(Czech Republic) J Menšík	2	1^{r}
LL	(Italy) L Nardi	6	2
(Serbia) H Medjedovic	4	4
2	(Spain) C Alcaraz	6	6

Fourth round
LL	(Italy) L Nardi	1	4
2	(Spain) C Alcaraz	6	6

== Seeded players ==
The following are the seeded players. Seedings are based on ATP rankings as of 28 July 2025. Rankings and points before are as of 4 August 2025.

Due to a change in schedule this year, ATP ranking points from the 2024 National Bank Open held in Montreal and the 2024 Cincinnati Open will both be dropped at the end of the 2025 Cincinnati Open. Accordingly, the points defending column in the table below reflects the relevant player's results from both Cincinnati and Montreal 2024, with the Cincinnati result listed first. Unless otherwise specified, any points deducted from Montreal will be replaced with the player's next best result (listed second under points earned). Note that this method of calculating ranking points for this year's tournament is different from the WTA's method.

Seed	Rank	Player	Points before	Points defending (Cincinnati and Montreal)	Points earned (Cincinnati and next best)	Points after	Status
1	1	(Italy) Jannik Sinner	12,030	1,000+200	650+0	11,480	Runner-up, retired against (Spain) Carlos Alcaraz [2]
2	2	(Spain) Carlos Alcaraz	8,590	10+0	1,000+10	9,590	Champion, by retirement of (Italy) Jannik Sinner [1]
3	3	(Germany) Alexander Zverev	6,380	400+200	400+50	6,230	Semifinals lost to (Spain) Carlos Alcaraz [2]
4	4	(United States) Taylor Fritz	5,525	10+50	100+10	5,575	Fourth round lost to (France) Térence Atmane [Q]
5	6	(United States) Ben Shelton	4,320	200+50	200+10	4,280	Quarterfinals to (Germany) Alexander Zverev [3]
6	8	(Australia) Alex de Minaur	3,480	0+0	10+55	3,545	Second round lost to (United States) Reilly Opelka
7	9	(Denmark) Holger Rune	3,340	400+100	200+10	3,050	Quarterfinals lost to (France) Térence Atmane [Q]
8	10	(Italy) Lorenzo Musetti	3,235	50+0	10+10	3,205	Second round lost to (France) Benjamin Bonzi
9	11	Andrey Rublev	3,210	200+650	200+50	2,610	Quarterfinals lost to (Spain) Carlos Alcaraz [2]
10	14	(United States) Frances Tiafoe	2,890	650^{†}	100	2,340	Fourth round retired against (Denmark) Holger Rune [7]
11	13	(Norway) Casper Ruud	2,995	10+100	10+10	2,905	Second round lost to (France) Arthur Rinderknech
12	15	Daniil Medvedev	2,760	10^{†}	10	2,760	Second round lost to (Australia) Adam Walton
13	16	(United States) Tommy Paul	2,610	10+50	50+10	2,610	Third round lost to (France) Adrian Mannarino [Q]
14	12	Karen Khachanov	3,190	50+50	100+50	3,240	Fourth round retired against (Germany) Alexander Zverev [3]
15	22	(Italy) Flavio Cobolli	2,155	100+50	10+25	2,040	Second round lost to (France) Térence Atmane [Q]
16	17	(Czech Republic) Jakub Menšík	2,396	16^{‡}	50	2,430	Third round retired against (Italy) Luca Nardi [LL]
17	18	(Spain) Alejandro Davidovich Fokina	2,275	100^{‡}	10	2,185	Second round retired against (Brazil) João Fonseca
18	20	(France) Arthur Fils	2,180	50+10	0+0	2,120	Withdrew due to lower back injury
19	24	(Czech Republic) Tomáš Macháč	2,110	10^{†}	10	2,110	Second round lost to (France) Adrian Mannarino [Q]
20	25	(France) Ugo Humbert	2,085	10+50	50+10	2,085	Third round lost to (United States) Frances Tiafoe [10]
21	19	(Australia) Alexei Popyrin	2,250	10+1,000	50+0	1,290	Third round lost to Andrey Rublev [9]
22	26	(Czech Republic) Jiří Lehečka	2,065	100+0	100+50	2,115	Fourth round lost to (United States) Ben Shelton [5]
23	28	(Canada) Félix Auger-Aliassime	1,825	100+10	200+50	1,965	Quarterfinals lost to (Italy) Jannik Sinner [1]
24	30	(Canada) Denis Shapovalov	1,746	(8)^{§}	10	1,748	Second round lost to (Italy) Luca Nardi [LL]
25	29	(Greece) Stefanos Tsitsipas	1,790	50^{†}	50	1,790	Third round lost to (France) Benjamin Bonzi
26	32	(Netherlands) Tallon Griekspoor	1,675	(30)^{§}	10	1,655	Second round lost to (Serbia) Hamad Medjedovic
27	31	(United States) Brandon Nakashima	1,700	100+130	50+50	1,570	Third round lost to (Germany) Alexander Zverev [3]
28	33	(United States) Alex Michelsen	1,655	80+10	50+50	1,665	Third round lost to (Denmark) Holger Rune [7]
29	34	(Italy) Luciano Darderi	1,404	50+10	10+10	1,364	Second round retired against (Argentina) Francisco Comesaña
30	35	(Canada) Gabriel Diallo	1,367	(29)^{§}	50	1,388	Third round lost to (Italy) Jannik Sinner [1]
31	36	(Italy) Lorenzo Sonego	1,321	16+50	50+10	1,315	Third round lost to (United States) Taylor Fritz [4]
32	39	(United Kingdom) Cameron Norrie	1,277	0+0	10+10	1,297	Second round lost to (Spain) Roberto Bautista Agut

† The player is only defending 2024 points from Cincinnati as his 2024 points from Montreal were replaced by a better result for purposes of his ranking as of 4 August 2025.
‡ The player is only defending 2024 points from Montreal as he either did not qualify for the 2024 tournament in Cincinnati, or his 2024 points from Cincinnati were replaced by a better result for purposes of his ranking as of 4 August 2025.
§ The player is defending 2024 points from neither Cincinnati nor Montreal. Instead, he is defending points from either his 19th best result or from an ATP Challenger Tour tournament (Cary).

=== Withdrawn seeded players ===
The following players would have been seeded, but withdrew before the tournament began.

Rank	Player	Points before	Points dropping (Cincinnati and Montreal)	Points after	Withdrawal reason
5	(United Kingdom) Jack Draper	4,650	200+10	4,440	Arm injury
7	(Serbia) Novak Djokovic	4,130	0+0	4,130	Unspecified
21	(Bulgaria) Grigor Dimitrov	2,155	10+100	2,045	Pectoral injury
23	(Argentina) Francisco Cerúndolo	2,135	0^{‡}	2,135	Abdominal injury
27	(Kazakhstan) Alexander Bublik	2,055	0^{‡}	2,055	Schedule change

‡ The player is only defending 2024 points from Montreal as his 2024 points from Cincinnati were replaced by a better result for purposes of his ranking as of 4 August 2025.

== Other entry information ==
=== Wildcards ===
- (United States) Nishesh Basavareddy
- (United States) Tristan Boyer
- (United States) Jenson Brooksby
- (United States) Brandon Holt
- (Chile) Nicolás Jarry

=== Protected ranking ===
- (Austria) Sebastian Ofner

=== Withdrawals ===
- ‡ (Italy) Matteo Berrettini → replaced by (China) Shang Juncheng
- @ (United States) Jenson Brooksby → replaced by (Croatia) Borna Ćorić
- ‡ (Kazakhstan) Alexander Bublik → replaced by (Bolivia) Hugo Dellien
- † (Argentina) Francisco Cerúndolo → replaced by (Argentina) Mariano Navone (LL)
- ‡ (Bulgaria) Grigor Dimitrov → replaced by (Czech Republic) Vít Kopřiva
- ‡ (Serbia) Laslo Djere → replaced by (France) Hugo Gaston
- ‡ (Serbia) Novak Djokovic → replaced by (Japan) Yoshihito Nishioka
- ‡ (United Kingdom) Jack Draper → replaced by (United States) Aleksandar Kovacevic
- § (France) Arthur Fils → replaced by (France) Arthur Cazaux (LL)
- ‡ (France) Quentin Halys → replaced by (Australia) Adam Walton
- ‡ (Poland) Hubert Hurkacz → replaced by (Australia) Christopher O'Connell
- ‡ (United States) Sebastian Korda → replaced by (Chile) Alejandro Tabilo
- ‡ (Australia) Nick Kyrgios → replaced by (United States) Ethan Quinn
- § (France) Gaël Monfils → replaced by (Australia) Aleksandar Vukic (LL)
- † (Australia) Christopher O'Connell → replaced by (Italy) Luca Nardi (LL)

‡ – withdrew from entry list before qualifying began
† – withdrew from entry list after qualifying began
@ – withdrew from entry list using protected ranking and awarded wildcard
§ – withdrew from main draw

== Qualifying ==
=== Seeds ===
1. (France) Arthur Cazaux (qualifying competition, lucky loser)
2. (Argentina) Mariano Navone (qualifying competition, lucky loser)
3. (Argentina) Juan Manuel Cerúndolo (first round)
4. (Spain) Pablo Carreño Busta (first round)
5. (France) Adrian Mannarino (qualified)
6. (Italy) Luca Nardi (qualifying competition, lucky loser)
7. (Australia) Aleksandar Vukic (qualifying competition, lucky loser)
8. (Kazakhstan) Alexander Shevchenko (qualifying competition, retired)
9. (Australia) Tristan Schoolkate (first round)
10. (Australia) James Duckworth (first round)
11. (Chinese Taipei) Tseng Chun-hsin (withdrew)
12. (France) Valentin Royer (qualified)
13. (Georgia (country)) Nikoloz Basilashvili (qualifying competition)
14. (Canada) Liam Draxl (qualifying competition)
15. (United States) Emilio Nava (qualified)
16. (Chile) Cristian Garín (first round)
17. (Czech Republic) Dalibor Svrčina (qualifying competition)
18. (Belgium) Alexander Blockx (qualified)
19. (Japan) Shintaro Mochizuki (qualifying competition)
20. (United States) Eliot Spizzirri (first round)
21. (Italy) Matteo Gigante (first round)
22. (Argentina) Thiago Agustín Tirante (qualified)
23. (France) Térence Atmane (qualified)
24. (Colombia) Daniel Elahi Galán (qualified)

=== Qualifiers ===
1. (Argentina) Thiago Agustín Tirante
2. (United States) Emilio Nava
3. (Hong Kong) Coleman Wong
4. (Switzerland) Leandro Riedi
5. (France) Adrian Mannarino
6. (Belgium) Alexander Blockx
7. (United States) Patrick Kypson
8. (Colombia) Daniel Elahi Galán
9. (United States) Colton Smith
10. (France) Térence Atmane
11. (Spain) Martín Landaluce
12. (France) Valentin Royer

=== Lucky losers ===
1. (Argentina) Mariano Navone
2. (Italy) Luca Nardi
3. (France) Arthur Cazaux
4. (Australia) Aleksandar Vukic

=== Qualifying draw ===
==== First qualifier ====
First round
1	(France) Arthur Cazaux	4	6	6
(Estonia) Mark Lajal	6	1	2
(Japan) James Trotter	2	6	3
22	(Argentina) Thiago Agustín Tirante	6	3	6

Qualifying competition
1	(France) Arthur Cazaux	6^{7}	3
22	(Argentina) Thiago Agustín Tirante	7^{9}	6

==== Second qualifier ====
First round
2	(Argentina) Mariano Navone	6^{2}	6	6
(Germany) Jan-Lennard Struff	7^{7}	2	4
(Kazakhstan) Mikhail Kukushkin	5	2
15	(United States) Emilio Nava	7	6

Qualifying competition
2	(Argentina) Mariano Navone	5	4
15	(United States) Emilio Nava	7	6

==== Third qualifier ====
First round
3	(Argentina) Juan Manuel Cerúndolo	2	3
(Hong Kong) Coleman Wong	6	6
PR	(Argentina) Facundo Bagnis	6	3	4
19	(Japan) Shintaro Mochizuki	3	6	6

Qualifying competition
(Hong Kong) Coleman Wong	7^{7}	6
19	(Japan) Shintaro Mochizuki	6^{5}	3

==== Fourth qualifier ====
First round
4	(Spain) Pablo Carreño Busta	6^{3}	4
PR	(Switzerland) Leandro Riedi	7^{7}	6
PR	(South Africa) Lloyd Harris	7^{7}	4	7^{7}
20	(United States) Eliot Spizzirri	6^{5}	6	6^{2}

Qualifying competition
PR	(Switzerland) Leandro Riedi	7^{9}	6
PR	(South Africa) Lloyd Harris	6^{7}	3

==== Fifth qualifier ====
First round
5	(France) Adrian Mannarino	6	6
(United States) Mitchell Krueger	1	1
(Japan) Yosuke Watanuki	2	0
17	(Czech Republic) Dalibor Svrčina	6	6

Qualifying competition
5	(France) Adrian Mannarino	6	6
17	(Czech Republic) Dalibor Svrčina	3	4

==== Sixth qualifier ====
First round
6	(Italy) Luca Nardi	6	6
WC	(United States) Aidan Mayo	3	2
Alibek Kachmazov	2^{r}
18	(Belgium) Alexander Blockx	4

Qualifying competition
6	(Italy) Luca Nardi	4	3
18	(Belgium) Alexander Blockx	6	6

==== Seventh qualifier ====
First round
7	(Australia) Aleksandar Vukic	7	6^{3}	7^{7}
WC	(United States) Murphy Cassone	5	7^{7}	6^{4}
WC	(United States) Patrick Kypson	6	6
21	(Italy) Matteo Gigante	3	2

Qualifying competition
7	(Australia) Aleksandar Vukic	6^{3}	6^{4}
WC	(United States) Patrick Kypson	7^{7}	7^{7}

==== Eighth qualifier ====
First round
8	(Kazakhstan) Alexander Shevchenko	7^{7}	6^{8}	6
WC	(United States) Tyler Zink	6^{2}	7^{10}	3
(Japan) Taro Daniel	5	2
24	(Colombia) Daniel Elahi Galán	7	6

Qualifying competition
8	(Kazakhstan) Alexander Shevchenko	6^{6}	1^{r}
24	(Colombia) Daniel Elahi Galán	7^{8}	4

==== Ninth qualifier ====
First round
9	(Australia) Tristan Schoolkate	4	4
(United States) Colton Smith	6	6
(United States) Christopher Eubanks	4	6	6^{2}
13	(Georgia (country)) Nikoloz Basilashvili	6	4	7^{7}

Qualifying competition
(United States) Colton Smith	7	6
13	(Georgia (country)) Nikoloz Basilashvili	5	1

==== Tenth qualifier ====
First round
10	(Australia) James Duckworth	6^{4}	4
(Australia) Li Tu	7^{7}	6
(Australia) Omar Jasika	5	4
23	(France) Térence Atmane	7	6

Qualifying competition
(Australia) Li Tu	5	3
23	(France) Térence Atmane	7	6

==== Eleventh qualifier ====
First round
Alt	(United Kingdom) Arthur Fery	7^{7}	4	7^{7}
(United States) Zachary Svajda	6^{3}	6	6^{4}
(Spain) Martín Landaluce	6	3	7^{7}
16	(Chile) Cristian Garín	4	6	6^{5}

Qualifying competition
Alt	(United Kingdom) Arthur Fery	2	7^{7}	2
(Spain) Martín Landaluce	6	6^{5}	6

==== Twelfth qualifier ====
First round
12	(France) Valentin Royer	6	6
(Argentina) Juan Pablo Ficovich	1	2
WC	(United States) Andres Martin	3	6^{3}
14	(Canada) Liam Draxl	6	7^{7}

Qualifying competition
12	(France) Valentin Royer	2	6	6
14	(Canada) Liam Draxl	6	3	4
