= 2025 Cincinnati Open – Women's singles =

Women's singles
- 2025 Cincinnati Open

Final
- Champion: (Poland) Iga Świątek
- Runner-up: (Italy) Jasmine Paolini
- Score: 7–5, 6–4

Details
- Draw: 96
- Seeds: 32

Events
Singles	men	women
Doubles	men	women
← 2024 ·	Cincinnati Open	· 2026 →

Iga Świątek defeated Jasmine Paolini in the final, 7–5, 6–4 to win the women's singles tennis title at the 2025 Cincinnati Open. It was her first Cincinnati Open title and eleventh WTA 1000 title. Świątek did not lose a set during the tournament.

Aryna Sabalenka was the defending champion, but lost in the quarterfinals to Elena Rybakina.

== Seeds ==
All seeds received a bye into the second round.

1. Aryna Sabalenka (quarterfinals)
2. (United States) Coco Gauff (quarterfinals)
3. (Poland) Iga Świątek (champion)
4. (United States) Jessica Pegula (third round)
5. (United States) Amanda Anisimova (third round)
6. (United States) Madison Keys (fourth round)
7. (Italy) Jasmine Paolini (final)
8. (United States) Emma Navarro (second round)
9. (Kazakhstan) Elena Rybakina (semifinals)
10. (Ukraine) Elina Svitolina (second round)
11. (Czech Republic) Karolína Muchová (third round)
12. Ekaterina Alexandrova (fourth round)
13. Liudmila Samsonova (second round)
14. Diana Shnaider (second round)
15. (Australia) Daria Kasatkina (second round)
16. (Denmark) Clara Tauson (third round)
17. (Switzerland) Belinda Bencic (second round)
18. (Brazil) Beatriz Haddad Maia (second round)
19. (Belgium) Elise Mertens (third round)
20. (Czech Republic) Linda Nosková (second round)
21. (Canada) Leylah Fernandez (second round)
22. (Poland) Magdalena Fręch (second round)
23. (Latvia) Jeļena Ostapenko (third round)
24. (United States) Sofia Kenin (second round)
25. (Ukraine) Marta Kostyuk (third round, withdrew)
26. (United States) Ashlyn Krueger (third round)
27. Anastasia Pavlyuchenkova (second round)
28. Anna Kalinskaya (quarterfinals)
29. (United States) McCartney Kessler (third round)
30. (United Kingdom) Emma Raducanu (third round)
31. (Poland) Magda Linette (fourth round)
32. (Ukraine) Dayana Yastremska (third round, withdrew)

Click on the seed number of a player to go to their draw section.

In addition to the seeded players, the following players received performance byes into the second round after reaching the final in Montreal. Both players later withdrew from the tournament and were replaced by lucky losers.

- (Canada) Victoria Mboko (withdrew)
- (Japan) Naomi Osaka (withdrew)

== Draw ==
=== Key ===
- Q = Qualifier
- WC = Wild card
- LL = Lucky loser
- Alt = Alternate
- ITF = ITF entry
- PR = Protected ranking
- SR = Special ranking
- SE = Special exempt
- JE = Junior exempt
- JR = Junior Accelerator Programme entrant
- CO = College Accelerator Programme entrant
- NG = Next Gen Accelerator Program entrant
- w/o = Walkover
- r = Retired
- d = Defaulted

=== Finals ===
Quarterfinals
1	Aryna Sabalenka	1	4
9	(Kazakhstan) Elena Rybakina	6	6
3	(Poland) Iga Świątek	6	6
28	Anna Kalinskaya	3	4
Q	(France) Varvara Gracheva	1	2
Veronika Kudermetova	6	6
7	(Italy) Jasmine Paolini	2	6	6
2	(United States) Coco Gauff	6	4	3

Semifinals
9	(Kazakhstan) Elena Rybakina	5	3
3	(Poland) Iga Świątek	7	6
Veronika Kudermetova	3	7^{7}	3
7	(Italy) Jasmine Paolini	6	6^{2}	6

Final
3	(Poland) Iga Świątek	7	6
7	(Italy) Jasmine Paolini	5	4

=== Top half ===
==== Section 1 ====
First round
PR	(Czech Republic) M Vondroušová	6	6
(Romania) J Cristian	3	1
(Serbia) O Danilović	6	7
(United Kingdom) K Boulter	0	5
WC	(United States) V Williams	4	4
(Spain) J Bouzas Maneiro	6	6
(United States) D Collins	4	6^{2}
WC	(United States) T Townsend	6	7^{7}

Second round
1	A Sabalenka	7	6
PR	(Czech Republic) M Vondroušová	5	1
(Serbia) O Danilović	3	2
30	(United Kingdom) E Raducanu	6	6
21	(Canada) L Fernandez	3	3
(Spain) J Bouzas Maneiro	6	6
WC	(United States) T Townsend	6	6
13	L Samsonova	2	4

Third round
1	A Sabalenka	7^{7}	4	7^{7}
30	(United Kingdom) E Raducanu	6^{3}	6	6^{5}
(Spain) J Bouzas Maneiro	6	6
WC	(United States) T Townsend	4	1

Fourth round
1	A Sabalenka	6	7
(Spain) J Bouzas Maneiro	1	5

==== Section 2 ====
First round
(Mexico) R Zarazúa	3	6	6
(Kazakhstan) Y Putintseva	6	4	2
Q	(United States) C Ngounoue	6	4	6
(United States) H Baptiste	1	6	1
Q	(Japan) A Ito	6	7^{8}
(Romania) E-G Ruse	2	6^{6}
WC	(United States) B Pera	2	6	5
(Germany) E Lys	6	4	7

Second round
9	(Kazakhstan) E Rybakina	4	6	7
(Mexico) R Zarazúa	6	0	5
Q	(United States) C Ngounoue	6	6^{3}	5
19	(Belgium) E Mertens	3	7^{7}	7
27	A Pavlyuchenkova	1	6	4
Q	(Japan) A Ito	6	4	6
(Germany) E Lys	6	3	6^{1}
6	(United States) M Keys	1	6	7^{7}

Third round
9	(Kazakhstan) E Rybakina	4	6	7
19	(Belgium) E Mertens	6	3	5
Q	(Japan) A Ito	4	0
6	(United States) M Keys	6	6

Fourth round
9	(Kazakhstan) E Rybakina	6^{3}	6	6
6	(United States) M Keys	7^{7}	4	2

==== Section 3 ====
First round
A Potapova	6	6
Q	(Germany) L Siegemund	4	4
Q	(United States) W Osuigwe	2	3
(Germany) T Maria	6	6
PR	(Romania) S Cîrstea	6	4	6
(Croatia) D Vekić	1	6	3
LL	(Spain) C Bucșa	2	2
LL	(China) Y Yuan	6	6

Second round
3	(Poland) I Świątek	6	6
A Potapova	1	4
(Germany) T Maria	0	1
25	(Ukraine) M Kostyuk	6	6
22	(Poland) M Fręch	6^{4}	6	4
PR	(Romania) S Cîrstea	7^{7}	2	6
LL	(China) Y Yuan	6	1	6
14	D Shnaider	4	6	3

Third round
3	(Poland) I Świątek	w/o
25	(Ukraine) M Kostyuk
PR	(Romania) S Cîrstea	6^{2}	6	6
LL	(China) Y Yuan	7^{7}	4	4

Fourth round
3	(Poland) I Świątek	6	6
PR	(Romania) S Cîrstea	4	3

==== Section 4 ====
First round
(New Zealand) L Sun	6	6
Q	(Croatia) A Ružić	4	4
(Australia) M Joint	6	6
(Belgium) G Minnen	2	3
(United States) P Stearns	6	6
PR	(China) Y Wang	4	3
(Ukraine) Y Starodubtseva	5	6	4
Q	(France) L Jeanjean	7	1	6

Second round
12	E Alexandrova	6	6
(New Zealand) L Sun	4	2
(Australia) M Joint	6	4	6
18	(Brazil) B Haddad Maia	4	6	4
28	A Kalinskaya	7^{7}	4	6
(United States) P Stearns	6^{4}	6	1
Q	(France) L Jeanjean
5	(United States) A Anisimova	w/o

Third round
12	E Alexandrova	6	6
(Australia) M Joint	4	3
28	A Kalinskaya	7	6
5	(United States) A Anisimova	5	4

Fourth round
12	E Alexandrova	6	6^{5}	1
28	A Kalinskaya	3	7^{7}	6

=== Bottom half ===
==== Section 5 ====
First round
P Kudermetova	6	3	2
Q	(Germany) E Seidel	1	6	6
WC	(United States) C McNally	6	6
Q	(Australia) M Inglis	2	3
Q	(France) V Gracheva	6	3	6
WC	(United States) K Volynets	4	6	3
(United Kingdom) S Kartal	7	4	3
WC	(France) C Garcia	5	6	6

Second round
8	(United States) E Navarro	4	6	4
Q	(Germany) E Seidel	6	1	6
WC	(United States) C McNally	4	3
29	(United States) M Kessler	6	6
24	(United States) S Kenin	7^{9}	3	3
Q	(France) V Gracheva	6^{7}	6	6
WC	(France) C Garcia	6^{3}	6^{0}
11	(Czech Republic) K Muchová	7^{7}	7^{7}

Third round
Q	(Germany) E Seidel	6	2	7^{8}
29	(United States) M Kessler	4	6	6^{6}
Q	(France) V Gracheva	6	6
11	(Czech Republic) K Muchová	2	4

Fourth round
Q	(Germany) E Seidel	6	1	1
Q	(France) V Gracheva	2	6	6

==== Section 6 ====
First round
(Hungary) A Bondár	6^{0}	4
(Australia) A Tomljanović	7^{7}	6
(Netherlands) S Lamens	1	3
V Kudermetova	6	6
(United States) C Dolehide	6	4	6^{1}
(Slovakia) R Šramková	1	6	7^{7}
A Blinkova	2	1
(Australia) K Birrell	6	6

Second round
16	(Denmark) C Tauson	6	6^{5}	6
(Australia) A Tomljanović	3	7^{7}	4
V Kudermetova	6	7^{7}
17	(Switzerland) B Bencic	4	6^{0}
31	(Poland) M Linette	7^{7}	6
(Slovakia) R Šramková	6^{4}	0
(Australia) K Birrell	4	3
4	(United States) J Pegula	6	6

Third round
16	(Denmark) C Tauson	6	6^{4}	4
V Kudermetova	3	7^{7}	6
31	(Poland) M Linette	7^{7}	3	6
4	(United States) J Pegula	6^{5}	6	3

Fourth round
V Kudermetova	6	6
31	(Poland) M Linette	4	3

==== Section 7 ====
First round
Q	K Rakhimova	3	6	2
(Greece) M Sakkari	6	3	6
PR	(Latvia) A Sevastova	6	6^{6}	6
Q	(United States) E Bektas	4	7^{8}	1
LL	(United States) I Jovic	6	7^{7}
LL	(Argentina) S Sierra	3	6^{4}
(United States) A Parks	4	6	0
(Czech Republic) B Krejčíková	6	4	6

Second round
7	(Italy) J Paolini	7^{7}	7^{7}
(Greece) M Sakkari	6^{2}	6^{5}
PR	(Latvia) A Sevastova	4	6	3
26	(United States) A Krueger	6	0	6
20	(Czech Republic) L Nosková	3	0
LL	(United States) I Jovic	6	6
(Czech Republic) B Krejčíková	2	6	6
10	(Ukraine) E Svitolina	6	4	3

Third round
7	(Italy) J Paolini	7^{7}	6
26	(United States) A Krueger	6^{2}	1
LL	(United States) I Jovic	4	6	2
(Czech Republic) B Krejčíková	6	3	6

Fourth round
7	(Italy) J Paolini	6	6
(Czech Republic) B Krejčíková	1	2

==== Section 8 ====
First round
PR	(China) L Zhu	7^{8}	2	6^{6}
(Italy) L Bronzetti	6^{6}	6	7^{8}
(Japan) M Uchijima	5	6	4
(Colombia) C Osorio	7	1	6
(United States) A Li	4	5
Q	(Bulgaria) V Tomova	6	7
(China) Xin Wang	7^{7}	6
(Colombia) E Arango	6^{1}	3

Second round
15	(Australia) D Kasatkina	3	6	4
(Italy) L Bronzetti	6	1	6
(Colombia) C Osorio
23	(Latvia) J Ostapenko	w/o
32	(Ukraine) D Yastremska	6	2	6
Q	(Bulgaria) V Tomova	4	6	2
(China) Xin Wang	3	2
2	(United States) C Gauff	6	6

Third round
(Italy) L Bronzetti	1	6	6
23	(Latvia) J Ostapenko	6	3	4
32	(Ukraine) D Yastremska
2	(United States) C Gauff	w/o

Fourth round
(Italy) L Bronzetti	2	4
2	(United States) C Gauff	6	6

== Seeded players ==
The following are the seeded players. Seedings are based on WTA rankings as of July 28, 2025. Rankings and points before are as of August 11, 2025.

Unlike the ATP, the WTA is only dropping points from the 2024 Cincinnati Open this week, since points for the 2024 National Bank Open were already dropped from rankings as of August 11, 2025.

Seed	Rank	Player	Points before	Points defending	Points earned	Points after	Status
1	1	Aryna Sabalenka	12,010	1,000	215	11,225	Quarterfinals lost to (Kazakhstan) Elena Rybakina [9]
2	2	(United States) Coco Gauff	7,669	10	215	7,874	Quarterfinals lost to (Italy) Jasmine Paolini [7]
3	3	(Poland) Iga Świątek	6,933	0	1,000	7,933	Champion, defeated (Italy) Jasmine Paolini [7]
4	4	(United States) Jessica Pegula	5,488	650	65	4,903	Third round lost to (Poland) Magda Linette [31]
5	8	(United States) Amanda Anisimova	3,834	0	35^{‡}	3,869	Third round lost to Anna Kalinskaya [28]
6	6	(United States) Madison Keys	4,579	0	120	4,699	Fourth round lost to (Kazakhstan) Elena Rybakina [9]
7	9	(Italy) Jasmine Paolini	3,586	120	650	4,116	Runner-up, lost to (Poland) Iga Świątek [3]
8	11	(United States) Emma Navarro	3,095	10	10	3,095	Second round lost (Germany) Ella Seidel [Q]
9	10	(Kazakhstan) Elena Rybakina	3,283	10	390	3,663	Semifinals lost to (Poland) Iga Świątek [3]
10	13	(Ukraine) Elina Svitolina	2,944	120	10	2,834	Second round lost to (Czech Republic) Barbora Krejčíková
11	14	(Czech Republic) Karolína Muchová	2,838	65	65	2,838	Third round lost to (France) Varvara Gracheva [Q]
12	16	Ekaterina Alexandrova	2,676	10	120	2,786	Fourth round lost to Anna Kalinskaya [28]
13	18	Liudmila Samsonova	2,371	215	10	2,166	Second round lost to (United States) Taylor Townsend [WC]
14	20	Diana Shnaider	2,146	120	10	2,036	Second round lost to (China) Yuan Yue [LL]
15	17	(Australia) Daria Kasatkina	2,416	65	10	2,361	Second round lost to (Italy) Lucia Bronzetti
16	15	(Denmark) Clara Tauson	2,726	(10)^{†}	65	2,781	Third round lost to Veronika Kudermetova
17	19	(Switzerland) Belinda Bencic	2,255	0	10	2,265	Second round lost to Veronika Kudermetova
18	22	(Brazil) Beatriz Haddad Maia	2,074	10	10	2,074	Second round lost to (Australia) Maya Joint
19	21	(Belgium) Elise Mertens	1,996	10	65	2,051	Third round lost to (Kazakhstan) Elena Rybakina [9]
20	23	(Czech Republic) Linda Nosková	1,942	10	10	1,942	Second round lost to (United States) Iva Jovic [LL]
21	26	(Canada) Leylah Fernandez	1,763	215	10	1,558	Second round lost to (Spain) Jéssica Bouzas Maneiro
22	28	(Poland) Magdalena Fręch	1,711	95	10	1,626	Second round lost to (Romania) Sorana Cîrstea [PR]
23	30	(Latvia) Jeļena Ostapenko	1,695	10	35^{‡}	1,720	Third round lost to (Italy) Lucia Bronzetti
24	29	(United States) Sofia Kenin	1,708	(10)^{†}	10	1,708	Second round lost to (France) Varvara Gracheva [Q]
25	27	(Ukraine) Marta Kostyuk	1,711	120	65	1,656	Third round withdrew due to right wrist injury
26	35	(United States) Ashlyn Krueger	1,404	95	65	1,374	Third round lost to (Italy) Jasmine Paolini [7]
27	33	Anastasia Pavlyuchenkova	1,449	215	10	1,244	Second round lost to (Japan) Aoi Ito [Q]
28	34	Anna Kalinskaya	1,432	65	215	1,582	Quarterfinals lost to (Poland) Iga Świątek [3]
29	32	(United States) McCartney Kessler	1,475	(10)^{†}	65	1,530	Third round lost to (Germany) Ella Seidel [Q]
30	39	(United Kingdom) Emma Raducanu	1,362	(1)^{†}	65	1,426	Third round lost to Aryna Sabalenka [1]
31	40	(Poland) Magda Linette	1,349	65	120	1,404	Fourth round lost to Veronika Kudermetova
32	31	(Ukraine) Dayana Yastremska	1,504	10	65	1,559	Third round withdrew due to illness

† The player did not qualify for the 2024 tournament. Points from either her 6th best combined WTA 1000 result or her 18th best result will be deducted instead.
‡ The player received second-round points only because she advanced to the third round via a bye and a walkover.

=== Withdrawn seeded players ===
The following players would have been seeded, but withdrew before the tournament began.

Rank	Player	Points before	Points dropping	Points after	Withdrawal reason
5	Mirra Andreeva	4,948	215	4,733	Ankle injury
7	(China) Zheng Qinwen	4,553	120	4,433	Elbow injury
12	(Spain) Paula Badosa	2,954	390	2,564	Lower back injury

== Other entry information ==
=== Wildcards ===
- (France) Caroline Garcia
- (United States) Caty McNally
- (United States) Bernarda Pera
- (United States) Taylor Townsend
- (United States) Katie Volynets
- (United States) Venus Williams

=== Special exempt ===
- ~~(Canada) Victoria Mboko~~

=== Protected ranking ===
- (Romania) Sorana Cîrstea
- (Latvia) Anastasija Sevastova
- (Czech Republic) Markéta Vondroušová
- (China) Wang Yafan
- (China) Zhu Lin

=== Withdrawals ===
- ‡ (Canada) Bianca Andreescu → replaced by (Hungary) Anna Bondár
- ‡ Mirra Andreeva → replaced by (Australia) Kimberly Birrell
- ‡ (Armenia) Elina Avanesyan → replaced by (Greece) Maria Sakkari
- ‡ (Spain) Paula Badosa → replaced by (Belgium) Greet Minnen
- ‡ (France) Loïs Boisson → replaced by (Japan) Moyuka Uchijima
- ‡ (Czech Republic) Marie Bouzková → replaced by (Colombia) Emiliana Arango
- ‡ (Philippines) Alexandra Eala → replaced by (Mexico) Renata Zarazúa
- ‡ (Tunisia) Ons Jabeur → replaced by (Ukraine) Yuliia Starodubtseva
- ‡ (Czech Republic) Petra Kvitová → replaced by (China) Wang Yafan
- § (Canada) Victoria Mboko → replaced by (Spain) Cristina Bucșa and (China) Yuan Yue (both LL)
- § (Japan) Naomi Osaka → replaced by (United States) Iva Jovic and (Argentina) Solana Sierra (both LL)
- ‡ (China) Zheng Qinwen → replaced by (Netherlands) Suzan Lamens

‡ – withdrew from entry list
§ – withdrew from main draw (performance bye canceled and player replaced by two lucky losers)

== Qualifying ==
=== Seeds ===
1. (Germany) Laura Siegemund (qualified)
2. Kamilla Rakhimova (qualified)
3. (Argentina) Solana Sierra (qualifying competition, lucky loser)
4. (Italy) Elisabetta Cocciaretto (first round)
5. (United States) Iva Jovic (qualifying competition, lucky loser)
6. (China) Yuan Yue (qualifying competition, lucky loser)
7. (Croatia) Antonia Ružić (qualified)
8. (Spain) Cristina Bucșa (qualifying competition, lucky loser)
9. (France) Léolia Jeanjean (qualified)
10. (France) Elsa Jacquemot (qualifying competition)
11. (Spain) Nuria Párrizas Díaz (first round)
12. (Hungary) Dalma Gálfi (qualifying competition)
13. Anastasia Zakharova (qualifying competition)
14. (Switzerland) Rebeka Masarova (qualifying competition)
15. (Bulgaria) Viktoriya Tomova (qualified)
16. (France) Varvara Gracheva (qualified)
17. (Japan) Aoi Ito (qualified)
18. (Australia) Olivia Gadecki (first round)
19. (Romania) Anca Todoni (first round)
20. Aliaksandra Sasnovich (first round)
21. (Poland) Katarzyna Kawa (first round)
22. (Canada) Rebecca Marino (qualifying competition)
23. (Japan) Ena Shibahara (first round)
24. (United States) Varvara Lepchenko (first round)

=== Qualifiers ===
1. (Germany) Laura Siegemund
2. Kamilla Rakhimova
3. (United States) Emina Bektas
4. (Germany) Ella Seidel
5. (France) Varvara Gracheva
6. (United States) Clervie Ngounoue
7. (Croatia) Antonia Ružić
8. (United States) Whitney Osuigwe
9. (France) Léolia Jeanjean
10. (Bulgaria) Viktoriya Tomova
11. (Australia) Maddison Inglis
12. (Japan) Aoi Ito

=== Lucky losers ===
1. (Argentina) Solana Sierra
2. (China) Yuan Yue
3. (United States) Iva Jovic
4. (Spain) Cristina Bucșa

=== Qualifying draw ===
==== First qualifier ====
First round
1	(Germany) Laura Siegemund	6	6
(Australia) Destanee Aiava	1	1
(China) Guo Hanyu	6	6
19	(Romania) Anca Todoni	1	0

Qualifying competition
1	(Germany) Laura Siegemund	6	6^{5}	6
(China) Guo Hanyu	2	7^{7}	3

==== Second qualifier ====
First round
2	Kamilla Rakhimova	7^{10}	6
PR	(United Kingdom) Jodie Burrage	6^{8}	2
(United States) Elizabeth Mandlik	2	6^{2}
22	(Canada) Rebecca Marino	6	7^{7}

Qualifying competition
2	Kamilla Rakhimova	3	6	7
22	(Canada) Rebecca Marino	6	4	5

==== Third qualifier ====
First round
3	(Argentina) Solana Sierra	6	6
PR	(Italy) Martina Trevisan	3	4
(United States) Emina Bektas	6	6
21	(Poland) Katarzyna Kawa	1	1

Qualifying competition
3	(Argentina) Solana Sierra	3	5
(United States) Emina Bektas	6	7

==== Fourth qualifier ====
First round
4	(Italy) Elisabetta Cocciaretto	4	4
(Australia) Priscilla Hon	6	6
(Germany) Ella Seidel	6	6
24	(United States) Varvara Lepchenko	2	1

Qualifying competition
(Australia) Priscilla Hon	7	3	4
(Germany) Ella Seidel	5	6	6

==== Fifth qualifier ====
First round
5	(United States) Iva Jovic	7	6
(Norway) Ulrikke Eikeri	5	2
PR	(Romania) Mihaela Buzărnescu	0	2
16	(France) Varvara Gracheva	6	6

Qualifying competition
5	(United States) Iva Jovic	3	4
16	(France) Varvara Gracheva	6	6

==== Sixth qualifier ====
First round
6	(China) Yuan Yue	6	6
(Australia) Astra Sharma	4	2
(United States) Clervie Ngounoue	6^{2}	6	6
18	(Australia) Olivia Gadecki	7^{7}	3	3

Qualifying competition
6	(China) Yuan Yue	6	4	3
(United States) Clervie Ngounoue	3	6	6

==== Seventh qualifier ====
First round
7	(Croatia) Antonia Ružić	6	6
(United States) Usue Maitane Arconada	2	4
(Japan) Eri Hozumi	6	4	6
23	(Japan) Ena Shibahara	4	6	2

Qualifying competition
7	(Croatia) Antonia Ružić	6	6
(Japan) Eri Hozumi	3	1

==== Eighth qualifier ====
First round
8	(Spain) Cristina Bucșa	6	6
(United States) Maria Mateas	1	1
(United States) Whitney Osuigwe	7^{7}	6
20	Aliaksandra Sasnovich	6^{4}	4

Qualifying competition
8	(Spain) Cristina Bucșa	3	3
(United States) Whitney Osuigwe	6	6

==== Ninth qualifier ====
First round
9	(France) Léolia Jeanjean	6	4	6
(Canada) Carol Zhao	1	6	3
(United States) Lauren Davis	2	4
14	(Switzerland) Rebeka Masarova	6	6

Qualifying competition
9	(France) Léolia Jeanjean	6	6
14	(Switzerland) Rebeka Masarova	3	4

==== Tenth qualifier ====
First round
10	(France) Elsa Jacquemot	2	7	7
PR	(Slovenia) Kaja Juvan	6	5	5
(United States) Louisa Chirico	2	1
15	(Bulgaria) Viktoriya Tomova	6	6

Qualifying competition
10	(France) Elsa Jacquemot	4	1
15	(Bulgaria) Viktoriya Tomova	6	6

==== Eleventh qualifier ====
First round
11	(Spain) Nuria Párrizas Díaz	6	6^{5}	2
(Australia) Maddison Inglis	1	7^{7}	6
(United Kingdom) Heather Watson	2	3
13	Anastasia Zakharova	6	6

Qualifying competition
(Australia) Maddison Inglis	4	6	6
13	Anastasia Zakharova	6	2	2

==== Twelfth qualifier ====
First round
12	(Hungary) Dalma Gálfi	2	6	6
(Japan) Nao Hibino	6	3	3
(Serbia) Aleksandra Krunić	6	4	2
17	(Japan) Aoi Ito	4	6	6

Qualifying competition
12	(Hungary) Dalma Gálfi	3	4
17	(Japan) Aoi Ito	6	6
