= 2025 Cincinnati Open – Men's doubles =

Men's doubles
- 2025 Cincinnati Open

Final
- Champions: (Croatia) Nikola Mektić (United States) Rajeev Ram
- Runners-up: (Italy) Lorenzo Musetti (Italy) Lorenzo Sonego
- Score: 4–6, 6–3, [10–5]

Details
- Draw: 32 (3 WC )
- Seeds: 8

Events
Singles	men	women
Doubles	men	women
← 2024 ·	Cincinnati Open	· 2026 →

Nikola Mektić and Rajeev Ram defeated Lorenzo Musetti and Lorenzo Sonego in the final, 4–6, 6–3, [10–5] to win the men's doubles tennis title at the 2025 Cincinnati Open.

Marcelo Arévalo and Mate Pavić were the defending champions, but lost in the quarterfinals to Joe Salisbury and Neal Skupski.

As a result of Arévalo and Pavić's loss in the quarterfinals, Lloyd Glasspool attained the ATP No. 1 doubles ranking at the end of the tournament, becoming the fourth Briton to hold the top spot.

== Seeds ==
1. (El Salvador) Marcelo Arévalo / (Croatia) Mate Pavić (quarterfinals)
2. (United Kingdom) Julian Cash / (United Kingdom) Lloyd Glasspool (semifinals)
3. (Finland) Harri Heliövaara / (United Kingdom) Henry Patten (first round)
4. (Germany) Kevin Krawietz / (Germany) Tim Pütz (second round)
5. (United Kingdom) Joe Salisbury / (United Kingdom) Neal Skupski (semifinals)
6. (Italy) Simone Bolelli / (Italy) Andrea Vavassori (quarterfinals)
7. (United States) Christian Harrison / (United States) Evan King (quarterfinals)
8. (Monaco) Hugo Nys / (France) Édouard Roger-Vasselin (second round)

== Draw ==
=== Key ===
- Q = Qualifier
- WC = Wild card
- LL = Lucky loser
- Alt = Alternate
- ITF = ITF entry
- PR = Protected ranking
- SR = Special ranking
- SE = Special exempt
- JE = Junior exempt
- JR = Junior Accelerator Programme entrant
- CO = College Accelerator Programme entrant
- NG = Next Gen Accelerator Program entrant
- w/o = Walkover
- r = Retired
- d = Defaulted

=== Finals ===
Semifinals
5	(United Kingdom) Joe Salisbury (United Kingdom) Neal Skupski	6	3	[11]
(Italy) Lorenzo Musetti (Italy) Lorenzo Sonego	4	6	[13]
(Croatia) Nikola Mektić (United States) Rajeev Ram	7^{7}	7^{7}
2	(United Kingdom) Julian Cash (United Kingdom) Lloyd Glasspool	6^{4}	6^{2}

Final
(Italy) Lorenzo Musetti (Italy) Lorenzo Sonego	6	3	[5]
(Croatia) Nikola Mektić (United States) Rajeev Ram	4	6	[10]

=== Top half ===
First round
1	(El Salvador) M Arévalo (Croatia) M Pavić	7^{7}	6
Alt	(India) A Chandrasekar (India) R Ramanathan	6^{5}	4
WC	(India) R Bopanna (United States) E Quinn	5	6	[6]
(Brazil) M Melo (Germany) A Zverev	7	3	[10]
WC	(United States) A Krajicek (United States) M McDonald	3	4
(France) S Doumbia (United States) B Nakashima	6	6
Alt	(Brazil) F Romboli (Australia) J-P Smith	6^{3}	2
5	(United Kingdom) J Salisbury (United Kingdom) N Skupski	7^{7}	6
3	(Finland) H Heliövaara (United Kingdom) H Patten	3	7^{7}	[6]
(Czech Republic) J Lehečka (Czech Republic) J Menšík	6	6^{3}	[10]
(Italy) L Musetti (Italy) L Sonego	6	7
(Argentina) M González (Argentina) A Molteni	3	5
(India) Y Bhambri (New Zealand) M Venus	6	6^{1}	[4]
Alt	(Portugal) F Cabral (Austria) L Miedler	3	7^{7}	[10]
(Italy) L Darderi (Greece) S Tsitsipas	5	5
8	(Monaco) H Nys (France) É Roger-Vasselin	7	7

Second round
1	(El Salvador) M Arévalo (Croatia) M Pavić	6	7^{7}
(Brazil) M Melo (Germany) A Zverev	2	6^{3}
(France) S Doumbia (United States) B Nakashima	4	6^{3}
5	(United Kingdom) J Salisbury (United Kingdom) N Skupski	6	7^{7}
(Czech Republic) J Lehečka (Czech Republic) J Menšík
(Italy) L Musetti (Italy) L Sonego	w/o
Alt	(Portugal) F Cabral (Austria) L Miedler	6	3	[10]
8	(Monaco) H Nys (France) É Roger-Vasselin	3	6	[7]

Quarterfinals
1	(El Salvador) M Arévalo (Croatia) M Pavić	4	3
5	(United Kingdom) J Salisbury (United Kingdom) N Skupski	6	6
(Italy) L Musetti (Italy) L Sonego	6	3	[10]
Alt	(Portugal) F Cabral (Austria) L Miedler	4	6	[6]

Semifinals
5	(United Kingdom) J Salisbury (United Kingdom) N Skupski	6	3	[11]
(Italy) L Musetti (Italy) L Sonego	4	6	[13]

=== Bottom half ===
First round
7	(United States) C Harrison (United States) E King	6	7^{7}
(Sweden) A Göransson (Netherlands) S Verbeek	3	6^{5}
Alt	(Monaco) R Arneodo (United States) R Galloway	6	3	[10]
(Netherlands) T Griekspoor (United States) A Michelsen	1	6	[6]
(Croatia) N Mektić (United States) R Ram	3	6	[10]
(Czech Republic) A Pavlásek (Poland) J Zieliński	6	1	[8]
(Australia) J Peers (United States) J Withrow	6^{4}	1
4	(Germany) K Krawietz (Germany) T Pütz	7^{7}	6
6	(Italy) S Bolelli (Italy) A Vavassori	6	6
(United States) N Lammons (Netherlands) D Pel	4	4
WC	(United States) R Cash (United States) JJ Tracy	6	4	[10]
(Spain) P Martínez (Norway) C Ruud	4	6	[5]
(Argentina) G Andreozzi (Netherlands) S Arends	4	6^{7}
(Australia) M Ebden (Australia) J Thompson	6	7^{9}
(Portugal) N Borges (Czech Republic) T Macháč	1	7	[8]
2	(United Kingdom) J Cash (United Kingdom) L Glasspool	6	5	[10]

Second round
7	(United States) C Harrison (United States) E King	7^{7}	3	[10]
Alt	(Monaco) R Arneodo (United States) R Galloway	6^{3}	6	[7]
(Croatia) N Mektić (United States) R Ram	7^{7}	7
4	(Germany) K Krawietz (Germany) T Pütz	6^{3}	5
6	(Italy) S Bolelli (Italy) A Vavassori	6	7^{10}
WC	(United States) R Cash (United States) JJ Tracy	3	6^{8}
(Australia) M Ebden (Australia) J Thompson	5	7	[8]
2	(United Kingdom) J Cash (United Kingdom) L Glasspool	7	5	[10]

Quarterfinals
7	(United States) C Harrison (United States) E King	4	4
(Croatia) N Mektić (United States) R Ram	6	6
6	(Italy) S Bolelli (Italy) A Vavassori	6^{7}	6^{4}
2	(United Kingdom) J Cash (United Kingdom) L Glasspool	7^{9}	7^{7}

Semifinals
(Croatia) N Mektić (United States) R Ram	7^{7}	7^{7}
2	(United Kingdom) J Cash (United Kingdom) L Glasspool	6^{4}	6^{2}

== Seeded teams ==
The following are the seeded teams. Seedings are based on ATP rankings as of August 4, 2025.

Country	Player	Country	Player	Rank	Seed
ESA	Marcelo Arévalo	CRO	Mate Pavić	2	1
GBR	Julian Cash	GBR	Lloyd Glasspool	7	2
FIN	Harri Heliövaara	GBR	Henry Patten	10	3
GER	Kevin Krawietz	GER	Tim Pütz	18	4
GBR	Joe Salisbury	GBR	Neal Skupski	23	6
ITA	Simone Bolelli	ITA	Andrea Vavassori	27	6
USA	Christian Harrison	USA	Evan King	35	7
MON	Hugo Nys	FRA	Édouard Roger-Vasselin	39	8

== Other entry information ==
=== Wildcards ===
- (India) Rohan Bopanna / (United States) Ethan Quinn
- (United States) Robert Cash / (United States) JJ Tracy
- (United States) Austin Krajicek / (United States) Mackenzie McDonald

=== Alternates ===
- (Monaco) Romain Arneodo / (United States) Robert Galloway
- (Portugal) Francisco Cabral / (Austria) Lucas Miedler
- (India) Anirudh Chandrasekar / (India) Ramkumar Ramanathan
- (Brazil) Fernando Romboli / (Australia) John-Patrick Smith

=== Withdrawals ===
- § (Canada) Félix Auger-Aliassime / (Canada) Denis Shapovalov → replaced by (Brazil) Fernando Romboli / (Australia) John-Patrick Smith
- ‡ (Argentina) Francisco Cerúndolo / (Italy) Luciano Darderi → replaced by (Italy) Luciano Darderi / (Greece) Stefanos Tsitsipas
- § (Italy) Flavio Cobolli / (Spain) Alejandro Davidovich Fokina → replaced by (Monaco) Romain Arneodo / (United States) Robert Galloway
- § (Canada) Gabriel Diallo / (United States) Ben Shelton → replaced by (Portugal) Francisco Cabral / (Austria) Lucas Miedler
- ‡ (France) Sadio Doumbia / (France) Fabien Reboul → replaced by (France) Sadio Doumbia / (United States) Brandon Nakashima
- ‡ (Mexico) Santiago González / (United Kingdom) Jamie Murray → replaced by (Spain) Pedro Martínez / (Norway) Casper Ruud
- ‡ (Spain) Marcel Granollers / (Argentina) Horacio Zeballos → replaced by (United States) Nathaniel Lammons / (Netherlands) David Pel
- § Karen Khachanov / Andrey Rublev → replaced by (India) Anirudh Chandrasekar / (India) Ramkumar Ramanathan

‡ – withdrew from entry list
§ – withdrew from main draw
