= 2025 Cincinnati Open =

- Date: 7–18 August
- Edition: 124th (men) / 97th (women)
- Category: ATP Tour Masters 1000 (men); WTA 1000 (women)
- Surface: Hard
- Location: Mason, Ohio, U.S.
- Venue: Lindner Family Tennis Center

Champions

Men's singles
- (Spain) Carlos Alcaraz

Women's singles
- (Poland) Iga Świątek

Men's doubles
- (Croatia) Nikola Mektić / (United States) Rajeev Ram

Women's doubles
- (Canada) Gabriela Dabrowski / (New Zealand) Erin Routliffe
- Cincinnati Open

The 2025 Cincinnati Open was a combined men's and women's tennis tournament played on outdoor hardcourts from 7 to 18 August 2025. It was classified as a Masters 1000 tournament on the 2025 ATP Tour and a WTA 1000 tournament on the 2025 WTA Tour. The tournament was the 124th men's edition and the 97th women's edition of the Cincinnati Open. It took place at the renovated Lindner Family Tennis Center in Mason, Ohio, a northern suburb of Cincinnati, in the United States. The singles draws for both events were increased from 56 to 96 players this year.

== Points and prize money ==
=== Points distribution ===
Event	W	F	SF	QF	R16	R32	R64	R128	Q	Q2	Q1
Men's singles	1000	650	400	200	100	50	30*	10**	20	10	0
Men's doubles	1000	600	360	180	90	0	—N/a	—N/a	—N/a	—N/a	—N/a
Women's singles	1000	650	390	215	120	65	35*	10	30	20	2
Women's doubles	1000	650	390	215	120	10	—N/a	—N/a	—N/a	—N/a	—N/a

* Players with byes receive first-round points.
** Singles players with wild cards earn 0 points.

=== Prize money ===
Event	W	F	SF	QF	Round of 16	Round of 32	Round of 64	Round of 128
Men's singles	$1,124,380	$597,890	$332,160	$189,075	$103,225	$60,400	$35,260	$23,760
Women's singles	$752,275	$391,600	$206,100	$106,900	$56,678	$32,840	$18,200	$11,270
Men's doubles*	$457,150	$242,020	$129,970	$65,000	$34,850	$19,050	—N/a	—N/a
Women's doubles*	$262,780	$139,120	$74,700	$37,360	$19,970	$10,950	—N/a	—N/a

_{*per team}

== Champions ==
=== Men's singles ===
- (Spain) Carlos Alcaraz def. (Italy) Jannik Sinner, 5–0 ret.

=== Women's singles ===
- (Poland) Iga Świątek def. (Italy) Jasmine Paolini, 7–5, 6–4

=== Men's doubles ===
- (Croatia) Nikola Mektić / (United States) Rajeev Ram def. (Italy) Lorenzo Musetti / (Italy) Lorenzo Sonego, 4–6, 6–3, [10–5]

=== Women's doubles ===
- (Canada) Gabriela Dabrowski / (New Zealand) Erin Routliffe def. (China) Guo Hanyu / Alexandra Panova, 6–4, 6–3
