= Madison Keys career statistics =

Career finals
Discipline	Type	Won	Lost	Total
Singles	Grand Slam	1	1	2
Singles	WTA Finals	-	-	-
Singles	WTA 1000	1	2	3
Singles	WTA 500/250	9	2	11
Singles	Olympics	-	-	-
Singles	Total	11	5	16
Doubles	Grand Slam	-	-	-
Doubles	WTA Finals	-	-	-
Doubles	WTA 1000	-	-	-
Doubles	WTA 500/250	-	-	-
Doubles	Olympics	-	-	-
Doubles	Total	-	-	-

This is a list of the main career statistics of American professional tennis player Madison Keys. To date, Keys has won eleven career singles titles. Her most significant title is the 2025 Australian Open. She also has won one WTA 1000, seven WTA 500, and reached four more finals. Having first cracked the top 100, after reaching the third round at the 2013 Australian Open, Keys introduced herself to the wider public when she reached the Australian Open semifinals in 2015 as a teenager, losing to the world No. 1 and eventual champion, Serena Williams. She cracked the top 20 for the first time following the tournament. On June 20, 2016, Keys achieved a top 10 ranking for the first time in her career, which she secured by reaching the Birmingham final. In September 2017, Keys reached her first major final at the 2017 US Open.

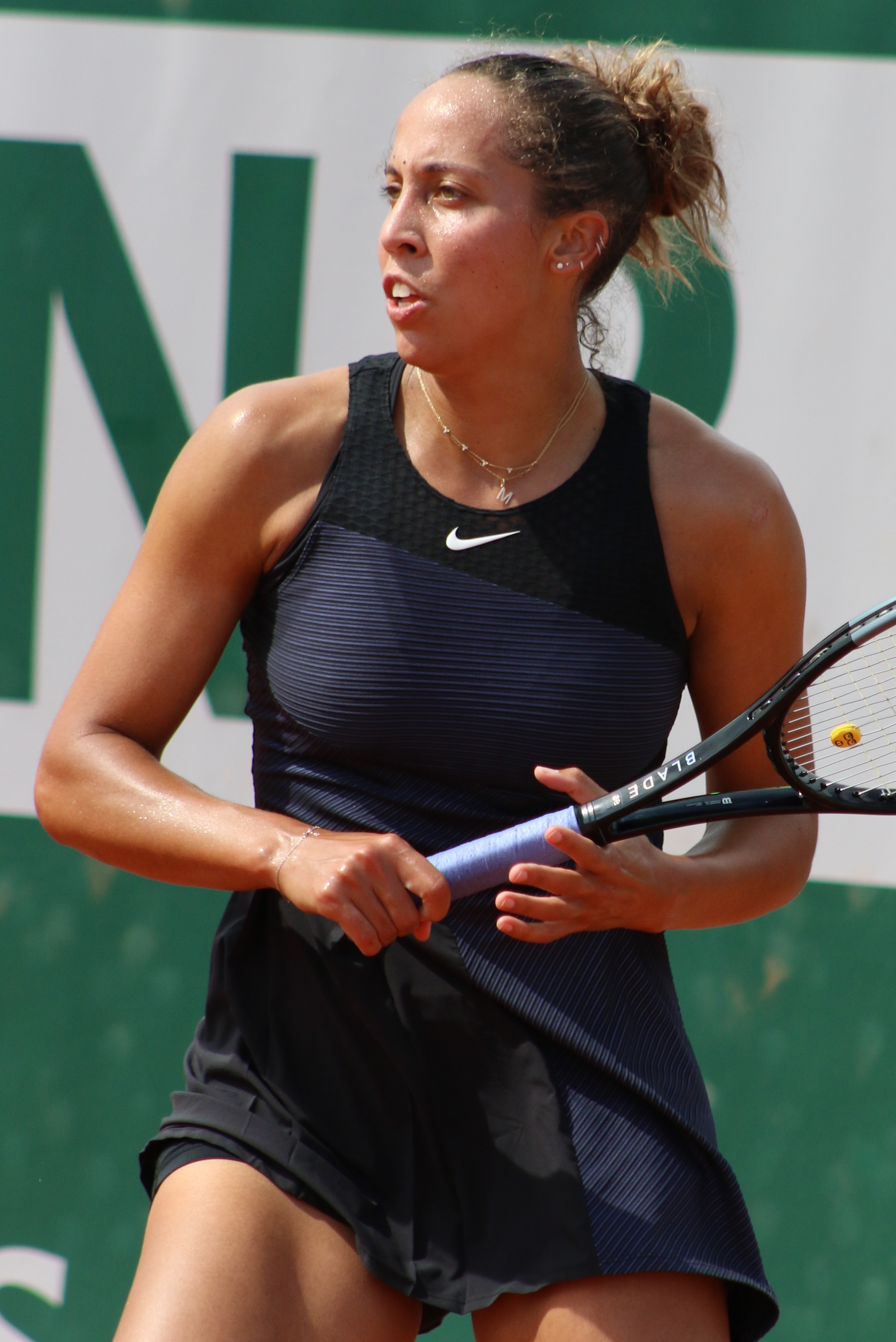
Keys at the 2021 French Open

== Performance timelines ==
Key
W	F	SF	QF	#R	RR	Q#	P#	DNQ	A	Z#	PO	G	S	B	NMS	NTI	P	NH

(W) winner; (F) finalist; (SF) semifinalist; (QF) quarterfinalist; (#R) rounds 4, 3, 2, 1; (RR) round-robin stage; (Q#) qualification round; (P#) preliminary round; (DNQ) did not qualify; (A) absent; (Z#) Davis/Fed Cup Zonal Group (with number indication) or (PO) play-off; (G) gold, (S) silver or (B) bronze Olympic/Paralympic medal; (NMS) not a Masters tournament; (NTI) not a Tier I tournament; (P) postponed; (NH) not held; (SR) strike rate (events won / competed); (W–L) win–loss record.
To avoid confusion and double counting, these charts are updated at the conclusion of a tournament or when the player's participation has ended.

Only main-draw results in WTA Tour, Grand Slam tournaments, Billie Jean King Cup, United Cup, Hopman Cup and Olympic Games are included in win–loss records.

=== Singles ===
Current after the 2026 Italian Open.

Tournament	2009	2010	2011	2012	2013	2014	2015	2016	2017	2018	2019	2020	2021	2022	2023	2024	2025	2026	SR	W–L	Win %
Grand Slam tournaments
Australian Open	A	A	A	1R	3R	2R	SF	4R	A	QF	4R	3R	A	SF	3R	A	W	4R	1 / 12	37–11	77%
French Open	A	A	A	A	2R	1R	3R	4R	2R	SF	QF	1R	3R	4R	2R	3R	QF	4R	0 / 14	31–14	69%
Wimbledon	A	A	A	Q2	3R	3R	QF	4R	2R	3R	2R	NH	4R	A	QF	4R	3R	4R	0 / 12	30–12	71%
US Open	A	Q1	2R	Q2	1R	2R	4R	4R	F	SF	4R	3R	1R	3R	SF	3R	1R	3R	0 / 15	35–15	70%
Win–loss	0–0	0–0	1–1	0–1	5–4	4–4	14–4	12–4	8–3	16–4	11–4	4–3	5–3	10–3	12–4	7–3	13–3	11–4	1 / 53	133–52	72%
Year-end championships
WTA Finals	DNQ							RR	DNQ			NH	DNQ	Alt	A	DNQ	RR		0 / 2	1–4	20%
WTA Elite Trophy (Note: WTA Tournament of Champions was held from 2009 to 2014, when WTA Elite Trophy replaced it.)	DNQ						RR	DNQ	A	SF (Note: Keys withdrew from the 2018 WTA Elite Trophy prior to the semifinals round match due to a left knee injury and was replaced in the semifinals by Wang Qiang. This does not officially count as a loss.)	RR	NH			RR	NH			0 / 4	3–5	38%
National representation
Summer Olympics	NH			A	NH			4th	NH				A	NH		A	NH		0 / 1	4–2	67%
Billie Jean King Cup (Note: Formerly known as Fed Cup until 2020.)	A	A	A	A	A	1R	A	PO	A	F	1R	A	A	RR	A	A	A		0 / 4	4–5	44%
WTA 1000 tournaments
Qatar Open	NTI			A	A	A	NTI	A	NTI	2R	NTI	A	NTI	A	NTI	A	A	A	0 / 1	1–1	50%
Dubai Championships	A	A	A	NTI			A	NTI	A	NTI	A	NTI	2R	NTI	QF	A	A	A	0 / 2	4–2	67%
Indian Wells Open	A	A	Q2	Q1	2R	2R	3R	2R	4R	2R	2R	NH	2R	QF	2R	3R	SF	3R	0 / 13	15–13	54%
Miami Open	A	A	1R	2R	2R	3R	2R	QF	3R	2R	2R	NH	2R	2R	3R	4R	3R	3R	0 / 15	13–15	46%
Madrid Open	A	A	A	A	2R	1R	1R	3R	1R	1R	1R	NH	1R	1R	A	SF	QF	A	0 / 11	10–11	48%
Italian Open	A	A	A	A	Q2	2R	2R	F	1R	3R (Note: Withdrew during the tournament. Not counted as a loss.)	2R	A	2R	1R	4R	QF	3R	3R	0 / 12	17–11	61%
Canadian Open	A	A	A	A	Q2	2R	A	F	A	A	1R	NH	1R	1R	2R	2R	QF	3R	0 / 9	11–8	58%
Cincinnati Open	A	A	A	1R	A	2R	2R	A	3R	QF	W	2R	1R	SF	1R	A	4R	QF	1 / 12	22–11	67%
China Open	A	A	A	A	2R	2R	3R	SF	A	2R	2R	NH			A	4R	A		0 / 7	12–6	67%
Wuhan Open (Note: In 2014, the Toray Pan Pacific Open was downgraded to a Premier event and replaced by the Wuhan Open. The Premier 5 tournaments were reclassified as WTA 1000 tournaments in 2021.)	A	A	A	A	3R	2R	2R	QF	1R	2R	A	NH				1R	A		0 / 7	7–7	50%
Guadalajara Open	NH													3R	2R	NTI			0 / 2	2–2	50%
Win–loss	0–0	0–0	0–2	1–2	6–5	8–8	6–7	21–7	4–5	9–6	8–6	0–1	3–7	9–7	6–6	12–7	14–6	7–5	1 / 88	114–87	57%
Career statistics
Career	2009	2010	2011	2012	2013	2014	2015	2016	2017	2018	2019	2020	2021	2022	2023	2024	2025	2026	SR	W–L	Win%
Tournaments	1	0	2	4	17	22	18	16	11	16	15	5	15	20	16	14	16	15	Career total: 223		
Titles	0	0	0	0	0	1	0	1	1	0	2	0	0	1	1	1	2	0	Career total: 10		
Finals	0	0	0	0	0	1	1	3	2	0	2	1	0	1	1	1	2	0	Career total: 15		
Hard win–loss	0–0	0–0	1–2	1–4	14–11	15–16	18–12	28–12	15–5	16–9	17–11	8–4	3–9	25–15	19–11	7–6	24–8	14–9	5 / 143	225–144	61%
Clay win–loss	1–1	0–0	0–0	0–0	5–4	5–5	9–4	11–4	1–4	11–4	10–3	0–1	3–4	4–4	5–3	13–4	9–4	7–3	2 / 55	95–52	65%
Grass win–loss	0–0	0–0	0–0	0–0	5–2	8–2	4–2	8–1	1–1	2–1	1–1	NH	5–2	1–1	9–1	4–2	4–3	10–2	4 / 25	62–21	75%
Overall win–loss	1–1	0–0	1–2	1–4	24–17	28–23	31–18	47–17	17–10	29–14	28–15	8–5	11–15	30–20	33–15	24–12	37–15	31–14	11 / 223	382–217	64%
Win %	50%	–	33%	20%	59%	55%	63%	73%	63%	67%	65%	62%	42%	60%	69%	67%	71%	69%	Career total: 64%		
Year-end ranking	621	483	315	149	37	31	18	8	19	17	13	16	56	11	12	21	7		$23,669,431		

=== Doubles ===
Current through the 2025 China Open

Tournament	2011	2012	2013	2014	2015	2016	2017	2018	2019	2020	2021	2022	2023	2024	2025	SR	W–L	Win %
Grand Slam tournaments
Australian Open	A	A	A	3R	1R	2R	A	A	A	A	A	A	A	A	A	0 / 3	3–3	50%
French Open	A	A	1R	3R	A	A	A	A	A	A	A	SF	A	A	A	0 / 3	5–3	63%
Wimbledon	A	A	1R	2R	1R	1R	A	A	A	NH	A	A	A	A	A	0 / 4	1–4	20%
US Open	1R	2R	A	A	1R	A	A	A	A	A	A	A	A	A	A	0 / 3	1–3	25%
Win–loss	0–1	1–1	0–2	4–3	0–3	1–2	0–0	0–0	0–0	0–0	0–0	4–1	0–0	0–0	0–0	0 / 13	10–13	43%
National representation
Billie Jean King Cup	A	A	A	1R	A	PO	A	F	1R	A	A	RR	A	A	A	0 / 4	2–1	67%
WTA 1000 tournaments
Qatar Open	NTI	A	A	A	NTI	A	NTI	A	NTI	A	NTI	A	NTI	A	A	0 / 0	0–0	–
Dubai Championships	A	Not Tier I			A	NTI	A	NTI	A	NTI	A	NTI	1R	A	A	0 / 1	0–1	0%
Indian Wells Open	A	A	A	1R	A	A	A	A	A	NH	A	2R	A	A	A	0 / 2	1–2	33%
Miami Open	A	A	1R	A	A	1R	A	A	A	NH	A	1R	1R	A	A	0 / 4	0–4	0%
Madrid Open	A	A	A	A	2R	A	A	A	A	NH	2R	A	A	A	2R	0 / 3	3–3	50%
Italian Open	A	A	A	A	A	A	1R	2R (Note: Keys withdraw before second round match. Not counted as a loss.)	A	A	A	A	A	A	A	0 / 2	1–1	50%
Canadian Open	A	A	A	A	A	A	A	A	A	NH	A	SF	A	A	1R	0 / 2	3–2	60%
Cincinnati Open	A	A	A	A	2R	A	A	A	A	1R	A	A	A	A	A	0 / 2	1–2	33%
China Open	A	A	A	A	A	A	A	A	A	NH			A	A	A	0 / 0	0–0	–
Wuhan Open	A	A	A	A	A	A	A	A	A	NH				A	A	0 / 0	0–0	–
Guadalajara Open	NH											A	A	NTI		0 / 0	0–0	–
Win–loss	0–0	0–0	0–1	0–1	2–2	0–1	0–1	1–0	0–0	0–1	1–1	4–3	0–2	0–0	1–2	0 / 16	9–15	38%
Career statistics
Tournaments	1	2	3	4	6	4	2	2	0	1	1	4	3	1	2	Career total: 36		
Overall win–loss	0–1	1–2	0–3	5–5	2–6	1–4	1–2	1–1	0–0	0–1	1–1	9–4	1–3	1–1	1–2	0 / 36	24–36	40%
Year-end ranking	907	265	972	123	240	350	465	479	n/a	n/a	540	56	549	562				

== Grand Slam tournament finals ==
=== Singles: 2 (1 title, 1 runner-up) ===
Result	Year	Tournament	Surface	Opponent	Score
Loss	2017	US Open	Hard	(United States) Sloane Stephens	3–6, 0–6
Win	2025	Australian Open	Hard	Aryna Sabalenka	6–3, 2–6, 7–5

== Other significant finals ==
=== WTA 1000 tournaments ===
==== Singles: 3 (1 title, 2 runner-ups) ====
Result	Year	Tournament	Surface	Opponent	Score
Loss	2016	Italian Open	Clay	(United States) Serena Williams	6–7^{(5–7)}, 3–6
Loss	2016	Canadian Open	Hard	(Romania) Simona Halep	6–7^{(2–7)}, 3–6
Win	2019	Cincinnati Open	Hard	(Russia) Svetlana Kuznetsova	7–5, 7–6^{(7–5)}

=== Summer Olympics ===
==== Singles: (4th place) ====
Result	Year	Tournament	Surface	Opponent	Score
4th place	2016	Rio Olympics, Brazil	Hard	(Czech Republic) Petra Kvitová	5–7, 6–2, 2–6

== WTA Tour finals ==
=== Singles: 16 (11 titles, 5 runner-ups) ===
Legend Grand Slam (1–1) Premier 5 / WTA 1000 (1–2) Premier / WTA 500 (7–2) WTA 250 (2–0)	Finals by surface Hard (5–3) Clay (2–2) Grass (4–0)	Finals by setting Outdoor (11–5) Indoor (0–0)

Result	W–L	Date	Tournament	Tier	Surface	Opponent	Score
Win	1–0	Jun 2014	Eastbourne International, UK	Premier	Grass	(Germany) Angelique Kerber	6–3, 3–6, 7–5
Loss	1–1	Apr 2015	Charleston Open, US	Premier	Clay (green)	(Germany) Angelique Kerber	2–6, 6–4, 5–7
Loss	1–2	May 2016	Italian Open, Italy	Premier 5	Clay	(United States) Serena Williams	6–7^{(5–7)}, 3–6
Win	2–2	Jun 2016	Birmingham Classic, UK	Premier	Grass	(Czech Republic) Barbora Strýcová	6–3, 6–4
Loss	2–3	Jul 2016	Canadian Open, Canada	Premier 5	Hard	(Romania) Simona Halep	6–7^{(2–7)}, 3–6
Win	3–3	Aug 2017	Silicon Valley Classic, US	Premier	Hard	(United States) CoCo Vandeweghe	7–6^{(7–4)}, 6–4
Loss	3–4	Sep 2017	US Open, US	Grand Slam	Hard	(United States) Sloane Stephens	3–6, 0–6
Win	4–4	Apr 2019	Charleston Open, US	Premier	Clay (green)	(Denmark) Caroline Wozniacki	7–6^{(7–5)}, 6–3
Win	5–4	Aug 2019	Cincinnati Open, US	Premier 5	Hard	(Russia) Svetlana Kuznetsova	7–5, 7–6^{(7–5)}
Loss	5–5	Jan 2020	Brisbane International, Australia	Premier	Hard	(Czech Republic) Karolína Plíšková	4–6, 6–4, 5–7
Win	6–5	Jan 2022	Adelaide International, Australia	WTA 250	Hard	(United States) Alison Riske	6–1, 6–2
Win	7–5	Jun 2023	Eastbourne International, UK (2)	WTA 500	Grass	Daria Kasatkina	6–2, 7–6^{(15–13)}
Win	8–5	May 2024	Internationaux de Strasbourg, France	WTA 500	Clay	(United States) Danielle Collins	6–1, 6–2
Win	9–5	Jan 2025	Adelaide International, Australia (2)	WTA 500	Hard	(United States) Jessica Pegula	6–3, 4–6, 6–1
Win	10–5	Jan 2025	Australian Open, Australia	Grand Slam	Hard	Aryna Sabalenka	6–3, 2–6, 7–5
Win	11–5	Jun 2026	Eastbourne Open, UK (3)	WTA 250	Grass	(Germany) Tatjana Maria	7–5, 6–4

== Fed Cup/Billie Jean King Cup participation ==
Current through the 2020 Fed Cup qualifying round

Group membership World Group (3–2) World Group Play-off (2–3)	Matches by surface Hard (3–5) Clay (2–0)	Matches by type Singles (4–4) Doubles (1–1)	Matches by location United States (3–5) Away (2–0)

=== Singles (4–4) ===
Edition	Round	Date	Location	Against	Surface	Opponent player	W/L	Score
2014	WG QF	Feb 2014	Cleveland (USA)	Italy	Hard (i)	Camila Giorgi	L	2–6, 1–6
2014	WG PO	Apr 2014	St. Louis (USA)	France	Hard (i)	Alizé Cornet	W	6–7^{(4–7)}, 7–6^{(7–4)}, 6–3
2014	WG PO	Apr 2014	St. Louis (USA)	France	Hard (i)	Caroline Garcia	L	4–6, 3–6
2016	WG PO	Apr 2016	Brisbane (AUS)	Australia	Clay	Daria Gavrilova	W	6–4, 6–2
2018	WG SF	Apr 2018	Aix-en-Provence (FRA)	France	Clay (i)	Pauline Parmentier	W	7–6^{(7–4)}, 6–4
2019	WG QF	Feb 2019	Asheville (USA)	Australia	Hard (i)	Kimberly Birrell	W	6–2, 6–2
2019	WG QF	Feb 2019	Asheville (USA)	Australia	Hard (i)	Ashleigh Barty	L	4–6, 1–6
2019	WG PO	Apr 2019	San Antonio (USA)	Switzerland	Hard (i)	Viktorija Golubic	L	2–6, 3–6

=== Doubles (1–1) ===
Edition	Round	Date	Location	Against	Surface	Partner	Opponent players	W/L	Score
2014	WG QF	Feb 2014	Cleveland (USA)	Italy	Hard (i)	Lauren Davis	Nastassja Burnett; Alice Matteucci	W	6–2, 6–3
2014	WG PO	Apr 2014	St. Louis (USA)	France	Hard (i)	Sloane Stephens	Caroline Garcia; Virginie Razzano	L	2–6, 5–7

== WTA 125 finals ==
=== Singles: 1 (runner-up) ===
Result	W–L	Date	Tournament	Surface	Opponents	Score
Loss	0–1	May 2026	WTA 125 Paris, France	Clay	(France) Diane Parry	6–3, 3–3 ret.

== ITF Circuit finals ==
=== Singles: 4 (3 titles, 1 runner-up) ===
Legend
$75,000 tournaments (1–0)
$50,000 tournaments (1–0)
$25,000 tournaments (0–1)
$10,000 tournaments (1–0)

Result	W–L	Date	Tournament	Tier	Surface	Opponent	Score
Win	1–0	Jun 2010	ITF Cleveland, U.S.	10,000 (Note: The $10,000 tournaments were reclassified as $15,000 in 2017. However, there were some $15,000 even before 2017.)	Clay	(Finland) Piia Suomalainen	6–2, 6–4
Loss	1–1	Oct 2010	ITF Bayamón, Puerto Rico	25,000	Hard	(United States) Lauren Davis	6–7^{(5–7)}, 4–6
Win	2–1	Oct 2012	ITF Saguenay, Canada	50,000 (Note: The $50,000 ITF tournaments were reclassified as $60,000 in 2017.)	Hard (i)	(Canada) Eugenie Bouchard	6–4, 6–2
Win	3–1	Nov 2012	ITF Phoenix, U.S.	75,000 (Note: The $75,000 ITF tournaments were reclassified as $75,000 in 2017.)	Hard	(United States) Maria Sanchez	6–3, 7–6^{(7–1)}

=== Doubles: 1 (1 title) ===
Legend
$100,000 tournaments
$75,000 tournaments
$50,000 tournaments (1–0)
$25,000 tournaments
$15,000 tournaments

Result	W–L	Date	Tournament	Tier	Surface	Partner	Opponents	Score
Win	1–0	Jul 2012	ITF Yakima, U.S.	50,000	Hard	(United States) Samantha Crawford	(China) Xu Yifan (China) Zhou Yimiao	6–3, 2–6, [12–10]

== WTA Tour career earnings ==
Current through the 2026 Brisbane International.

Year	Grand Slam titles	WTA titles	Total titles	Earnings ($)	Money list rank
2011	0	0	0	50,247	NA
2012	0	0	0	96,018	NA
2013	0	0	0	444,105	56
2014	0	1	1	630,567	41
2015	0	0	0	1,692,686	17
2016	0	1	1	2,311,022	12
2017	0	1	1	2,297,280	15
2018	0	0	0	2,554,853	16
2019	0	2	2	2,002,588	19
2020	0	0	0	512,474	39
2021	0	0	0	616,158	54
2022	0	1	1	1,740,514	16
2023	0	1	1	2,406,458	12
2024	0	1	1	1,465,226	29
2025	1	1	2	4,357,787	9
2026	0	0	0	37,640	28
Career	1	9	10	23,325,195	22

== Career Grand Slam statistics ==
=== Career Grand Slam seedings ===
The tournaments won by Keys are in boldface, and advanced into finals by Keys are in italics.

Year	Australian Open	French Open	Wimbledon	US Open
2010	did not play	did not play	did not play	did not qualify
2011	did not play	did not play	did not play	wild card
2012	wild card	did not play	did not qualify	did not qualify
2013	wild card	not seeded	not seeded	not seeded
2014	not seeded	not seeded	not seeded	27th
2015	not seeded	16th	21st	19th
2016	15th	15th	9th	8th
2017	did not play	12th	17th	15th (1)
2018	17th	13th	10th	14th
2019	17th	14th	17th	10th
2020	10th	12th	cancelled	7th
2021	did not play	23rd	23rd	not seeded
2022	not seeded	22nd	did not play	20th
2023	10th	20th	25th	17th
2024	did not play	14th	12th	14th
2025	**19th (1)**	7th	6th	6th
2026	9th			

=== Best Grand Slam results details ===
Grand Slam winners are in boldface, and runner–ups are in italics.

**Australian Open**
**2025 Australian Open (19th)**
Round	Opponent	Rank	Score
1R	(United States) Ann Li	84	6–4, 7–5
2R	(Romania) Elena-Gabriela Ruse (Q)	125	7–6^{(7–1)}, 2–6, 7–5
3R	(United States) Danielle Collins (10)	11	6–4, 6–4
4R	(Kazakhstan) Elena Rybakina (6)	7	6–3, 1–6, 6–3
QF	(Ukraine) Elina Svitolina (28)	27	3–6, 6–3, 6–4
SF	(Poland) Iga Świątek (2)	2	5–7, 6–1, 7–6^{(10–8)}
**W**	Aryna Sabalenka (1)	**1**	6–3, 2–6, 7–5

**Wimbledon Championships**
**2015 Wimbledon Championships (21st)**
Round	Opponent	Rank	Score
1R	(Switzerland) Stefanie Vögele	104	6–7^{(6–8)}, 6–3, 6–4
2R	(Russia) Elizaveta Kulichkova	109	6–4, 7–6^{(7–3)}
3R	(Germany) Tatjana Maria	78	6–4, 6–4
4R	(Belarus) Olga Govortsova (Q)	122	3–6, 6–4, 6–1
QF	(Poland) Agnieszka Radwańska (13)	13	6–7^{(3–7)}, 6–3, 3–6
**2023 Wimbledon Championships (25th)**
1R	(United Kingdom) Sonay Kartal (WC)	266	6–0, 6–3
2R	(Switzerland) Viktorija Golubic (Q)	139	7–5, 6–3
3R	(Ukraine) Marta Kostyuk	36	6–4, 6–1
4R	Mirra Andreeva (Q)	102	3–6, 7–6^{(7–4)}, 6–2
QF	Aryna Sabalenka (2)	2	2–6, 4–6

**French Open**
**2018 French Open (13th)**
Round	Opponent	Rank	Score
1R	(United States) Sachia Vickery	76	6–3, 6–3
2R	(United States) Caroline Dolehide (Q)	125	6–4, 6–1
3R	(Japan) Naomi Osaka (21)	20	6–1, 7–6^{(7–4)}
4R	(Romania) Mihaela Buzărnescu (31)	33	6–1, 6–4
QF	(Kazakhstan) Yulia Putintseva	98	7–6^{(7–5)}, 6–4
SF	(United States) Sloane Stephens (10)	10	4–6, 4–6

**US Open**
**2017 US Open (15th)**
Round	Opponent	Rank	Score
1R	(Belgium) Elise Mertens	39	6–3, 7–6^{(8–6)}
2R	(Germany) Tatjana Maria	61	6–3, 6–4
3R	(Russia) Elena Vesnina (17)	18	2–6, 6–4, 6–1
4R	(Ukraine) Elina Svitolina (4)	4	7–6^{(7–2)}, 1–6, 6–4
QF	(Estonia) Kaia Kanepi (Q)	418	6–3, 6–3
SF	(United States) CoCo Vandeweghe (20)	22	6–1, 6–2
F	**(United States) Sloane Stephens (PR)**	83	3–6, 0–6

== Wins against top 10 players ==
- Keys has a 35–49 (42%) record against players who were, at the time the match was played, ranked in the top 10.

No.	Player	Rk	Event	Surface	Rd	Score	Rk	Years	Ref
1.	(China) Li Na	5	Madrid Open, Spain	Clay	1R	6–3, 6–2	62	2013	
2.	(Serbia) Jelena Janković	7	Eastbourne International, UK	Grass	1R	6–3, 6–3	47	2014	
3.	(Germany) Angelique Kerber	9	Eastbourne International, UK	Grass	F	6–3, 3–6, 7–5	47	2014	
4.	(Czech Republic) Petra Kvitová	4	Australian Open, Australia	Hard	3R	6–4, 7–5	35	2015	
5.	(Italy) Roberta Vinci	9	Miami Open, United States	Hard	3R	6–4, 6–4	24	2016	
6.	(Czech Republic) Petra Kvitová	9	Italian Open, Italy	Clay	2R	6–3, 6–4	24	2016	
7.	(Spain) Garbiñe Muguruza	4	Italian Open, Italy	Clay	SF	7–6^{(7–5)}, 6–4	24	2016	
8.	(United States) Venus Williams	6	Canadian Open, Canada	Hard	3R	6–1, 6–7^{(2–7)}, 6–3	12	2016	
9.	(Russia) Svetlana Kuznetsova	7	China Open, China	Hard	3R	7–6^{(7–2)}, 6–2	9	2016	
10.	(Slovakia) Dominika Cibulková	8	WTA Finals, Singapore	Hard (i)	RR	6–1, 6–4	7	2016	
11.	(Spain) Garbiñe Muguruza	4	Silicon Valley Classic, United States	Hard	SF	6–3, 6–2	21	2017	
12.	(Ukraine) Elina Svitolina	4	US Open, United States	Hard	4R	7–6^{(7–2)}, 1–6, 6–4	16	2017	
13.	(France) Caroline Garcia	8	Australian Open, Australia	Hard	4R	6–3, 6–2	20	2018	
14.	(Germany) Angelique Kerber	4	Cincinnati Open, United States	Hard	3R	2–6, 7–6^{(7–3)}, 6–4	13	2018	
15.	(Russia) Daria Kasatkina	10	WTA Elite Trophy, China	Hard (i)	RR	6–2, 6–4	16	2018	
16.	(United States) Sloane Stephens	8	Charleston Open, United States	Clay	QF	7–6^{(8–6)}, 4–6, 6–2	18	2019	
17.	(Romania) Simona Halep	4	Cincinnati Open, United States	Hard	3R	6–1, 3–6, 7–5	18	2019	
18.	(Czech Republic) Petra Kvitová	7	Brisbane International, Australia	Hard	SF	3–6, 6–2, 6–3	13	2020	
19.	(Belarus) Aryna Sabalenka	4	Berlin Open, Germany	Grass	2R	6–4, 1–6, 7–5	28	2021	
20.	(Spain) Paula Badosa	6	Australian Open, Australia	Hard	4R	6–3, 6–1	51	2022	
21.	(Czech Republic) Barbora Krejčíková	4	Australian Open, Australia	Hard	QF	6–3, 6–2	51	2022	
22.	(Poland) Iga Świątek	1	Cincinnati Open, United States	Hard	3R	6–3, 6–4	24	2022	
23.	(France) Caroline Garcia	5	Dubai Championships, UAE	Hard	2R	7–5, 6–4	23	2023	
24.	(United States) Coco Gauff	7	Eastbourne International, UK	Grass	SF	6–3, 6–3	25	2023	
25.	(United States) Jessica Pegula	3	US Open, United States	Hard	4R	6–1, 6–3	17	2023	
26.	(Czech Republic) Markéta Vondroušová	9	US Open, United States	Hard	QF	6–1, 6–4	17	2023	
27.	(United States) Coco Gauff	3	Madrid Open, Spain	Clay	4R	7–6^{(7–4)}, 4–6, 6–4	18	2024	
28.	(Tunisia) Ons Jabeur	9	Madrid Open, Spain	Clay	QF	0–6, 7–5, 6–1	18	2024	
29.	Daria Kasatkina	9	Adelaide International, Australia	Hard	QF	6–1, 6–3	20	2025	
30.	(United States) Jessica Pegula	7	Adelaide International, Australia	Hard	F	6–3, 4–6, 6–1	20	2025	
31.	(Kazakhstan) Elena Rybakina	7	Australian Open, Australia	Hard	4R	6–3, 1–6, 6–3	14	2025	
32.	(Poland) Iga Świątek	2	Australian Open, Australia	Hard	SF	5–7, 6–1, 7–6^{(10–8)}	14	2025	
33.	Aryna Sabalenka	1	Australian Open, Australia	Hard	F	6–3, 2–6, 7–5	14	2025	
34.	(Canada) Victoria Mboko	9	French Open, France	Clay	3R	6–3, 5–7, 7–5	19	2026	
35.	(Czech Republic) Karolína Muchová	10	Berlin Open, Germany	Grass	QF	6–4, 7–5		2026	
36.	(United States) Amanda Anisimova	6	Wimbledon, United Kingdom	Grass	3R	3–6, 6–2, 6–3	22	2026	

- Key: (Rk) first use, opponent rank; (Rd) round; (Rk) 2nd use, player rank; (Ref) reference; (F) final; (SF) semifinal; (QF) quarterfinal; (#R) rounds 4, 3, 2, 1; (RR) round-robin stage; (Q#) qualifying rounds or stages (3), 2, 1.

== Longest winning streaks ==
=== 16-match winning streak (2025) ===
#	Tournament	Tier	Start date	Surface	Rd	Opponent	Rk	Score
–	ASB Classic	WTA 250	December 30, 2024	Hard	QF	(Denmark) Clara Tauson (5)	50	4–6, 6–7^{(7–9)}
1	Adelaide International	WTA 500	January 6, 2025	Hard	1R	(Brazil) Beatriz Haddad Maia	16	6–2, 6–1
2	Adelaide International	WTA 500	January 6, 2025	Hard	2R	(Latvia) Jeļena Ostapenko (8)	17	3–6, 6–4, 6–3
3	Adelaide International	WTA 500	January 6, 2025	Hard	QF	Daria Kasatkina (3)	9	6–1, 6–3
4	Adelaide International	WTA 500	January 6, 2025	Hard	SF	Liudmila Samsonova	26	5–7, 7–5, 3–0 ret.
5	Adelaide International	WTA 500	January 6, 2025	Hard	W	(United States) Jessica Pegula (1)	7	6–3, 4–6, 6–1
6	Australian Open	Grand Slam	January 12, 2025	Hard	1R	(United States) Ann Li	84	6–4, 7–5
7	Australian Open	Grand Slam	January 12, 2025	Hard	2R	(Romania) Elena-Gabriela Ruse (Q)	125	7–6^{(7–1)}, 2–6, 7–5
8	Australian Open	Grand Slam	January 12, 2025	Hard	3R	(United States) Danielle Collins (10)	11	6–4, 6–4
9	Australian Open	Grand Slam	January 12, 2025	Hard	4R	(Kazakhstan) Elena Rybakina (6)	7	6–3, 1–6, 6–3
10	Australian Open	Grand Slam	January 12, 2025	Hard	QF	(Ukraine) Elina Svitolina (28)	27	3–6, 6–3, 6–4
11	Australian Open	Grand Slam	January 12, 2025	Hard	SF	(Poland) Iga Świątek (2)	2	5–7, 6–1, 7–6^{(10–8)}
12	Australian Open	Grand Slam	January 12, 2025	Hard	W	Aryna Sabalenka (1)	1	6–3, 2–6, 7–5
13	Indian Wells Open	WTA 1000	March 5, 2025	Hard	2R	Anastasia Potapova	34	6–3, 6–0
14	Indian Wells Open	WTA 1000	March 5, 2025	Hard	3R	(Belgium) Elise Mertens (28)	28	6–2, 6–7^{(8–10)}, 6–4
15	Indian Wells Open	WTA 1000	March 5, 2025	Hard	4R	(Croatia) Donna Vekić (19)	22	4–6, 7–6^{(9–7)}, 6–3
16	Indian Wells Open	WTA 1000	March 5, 2025	Hard	QF	(Switzerland) Belinda Bencic (WC)	58	6–1, 6–1
–	Indian Wells Open	WTA 1000	March 5, 2025	Hard	SF	Aryna Sabalenka (1)	1	0–6, 1–6
