= 2025 Madison Keys tennis season =

2025 tennis player season

- Full name: Madison Keys
- Country: United States
- Calendar prize money: $4,357,787

Singles
- Season record: 37–15 (71%)
- Calendar titles: 2
- Current ranking: No. 7
- Ranking change from previous year: ▲14

Grand Slam & significant results
- Australian Open: W
- French Open: QF
- Wimbledon: 3R
- US Open: 1R
- Championships: RR

Doubles
- Season record: 1–2 (33%)
- Calendar titles: 0
- Current ranking: No. 507
- Ranking change from previous year: ▲55
- Last updated on: 4 December 2025.

The 2025 Madison Keys tennis season officially began on 30 December 2024, with the start of the ASB Classic in Auckland.

== Yearly summary ==
Keys opened her season at Auckland, where she lost in the quarterfinals to eventual champion Clara Tauson. Keys won the Adelaide International, defeating top seed Jessica Pegula in the final in three sets. It was her ninth career singles title.

Seeded 19th at the Australian Open, she defeated 10th seed Danielle Collins, 6th seed Elena Rybakina, and 28th seed Elina Svitolina to reach the semifinals. As a result, she returned to the top 10 in the singles rankings. In the semifinals, Keys upset world No. 2, Iga Świątek, in three sets, coming from a set down (the first semifinalist to do so since Venus Williams in 2017) and a match point down to reach the second major final of her career, eight years after being the US Open finalist. In the final, Keys defeated world No. 1 Aryna Sabalenka to win her first major title and return to her career-high ranking of world No. 7. She was the first player to win a major after defeating both the world No. 1 and world No. 2 at the Australian Open since Serena Williams in 2005 and at any major since Svetlana Kuznetsova at the 2009 French Open. Her two further wins over top-10 seeds (No. 6 Rybakina and No. 10 Collins) made her the fourth woman (after Evonne Goolagong Cawley at Wimbledon, Mary Pierce at the Australian Open, and Li Na at Roland Garros) to defeat four top-10 seeded opponents en route to a major title. At 29, she became both the oldest first-time women's Australian Open champion and the player with the longest gap between their first two major finals in the Open Era.

On February 24, Keys entered the top 5 for the first time in her career, reaching a ceer high ranking of No. 5. On her return to the tour following her Australian Open title, in Indian Wells, fifth seed Keys defeated Anastasia Potapova in straight sets, recording a bagel in the second set. She then defeated Elise Mertens and Donna Vekić in consecutive three-set matches to extend her winning streak to 15 matches in a row. She beat wildcard player Belinda Bencic in the quarterfinals. In the semifinals, she lost 0-6, 1-6 to top seed Aryna Sabalenka in a rematch of their Australian Open final, snapping her 16 match win streak.

Keys was upset by wild card Alexandra Eala in the third round of Miami. She also lost in the third round of Charleston to Anna Kalinskaya. She advanced to the quarterfinals of Madrid, where she lost in three sets to Świątek in a rematch of the previous year's semifinal. She lost in a third set tiebreak to Peyton Stearns in the third of Rome. She chose not to defend her title in Strasbourg.

Seeded 7th at Roland Garros, Keys reached the quarterfinals for the first time since 2019. She defeated Daria Saville, Katie Boulter, Sofia Kenin (saving match points), and Hailey Baptiste to do so. In the quarterfinals, she won the first set but lost in three to eventual champion Coco Gauff. This ended Keys's major match win streak at 11.

On grass courts, Keys made the semifinals of the Queen's Club Championships, where she was upset by eventual champion Tatjana Maria. She was upset in the first round of Berlin by former Wimbledon champion Markéta Vondroušová, who went on to win the title. Seeded 6th at Wimbledon, Wimbledon, she was upset in the third round by Laura Siegemund.

In the fourth round of Montreal, Keys saved match points to defeat 11th seed Karolína Muchová. She lost in the quarterfinals to Tauson. At Cincinnati, Keys lost in the fourth round to Rybakina in three sets. Seeded 6th at the US Open, she was upset by Renata Zarazúa in the first round in a match lasting over three hours.

For the second consecutive year, Keys did not play the Asian swing. Nevertheless, she qualified for the WTA Finals for the first time since 2016. Seeded 7th, Keys lost her opening round robin match to Świątek in her first match since the US Open. In her second match, she lost in three sets to Amanda Anisimova despite leading by a set and a break. Having already been eliminated from semifinal contention, Keys withdrew from her last round robin match against Rybakina due to illness, being replaced by Ekaterina Alexandrova (after Mirra Andreeva declined to take her spot). Keys finished the year ranked No. 7, her highest year end ranking in her career.

== All matches ==
This table chronicles all the matches of Madison Keys in 2025.

Key
W	F	SF	QF	#R	RR	Q#	P#	DNQ	A	Z#	PO	G	S	B	NMS	NTI	P	NH

(W) winner; (F) finalist; (SF) semifinalist; (QF) quarterfinalist; (#R) rounds 4, 3, 2, 1; (RR) round-robin stage; (Q#) qualification round; (P#) preliminary round; (DNQ) did not qualify; (A) absent; (Z#) Davis/Fed Cup Zonal Group (with number indication) or (PO) play-off; (G) gold, (S) silver or (B) bronze Olympic/Paralympic medal; (NMS) not a Masters tournament; (NTI) not a Tier I tournament; (P) postponed; (NH) not held; (SR) strike rate (events won / competed); (W–L) win–loss record.
To avoid confusion and double counting, these charts are updated at the conclusion of a tournament or when the player's participation has ended.

=== Singles matches ===
Tournament	Match	Round	Opponent	Rank	Result	Score
WTA Auckland Open; Auckland, New Zealand; WTA 250; Hard, outdoor; 30 December 2024 – 5 January 2025	1	1R	(Italy) Lucia Bronzetti	73	Win	6–4, 6–4
WTA Auckland Open; Auckland, New Zealand; WTA 250; Hard, outdoor; 30 December 2024 – 5 January 2025	2	2R	(Romania) Jaqueline Cristian	85	Win	6–1, 6–2
WTA Auckland Open; Auckland, New Zealand; WTA 250; Hard, outdoor; 30 December 2024 – 5 January 2025	3	QF	(Denmark) Clara Tauson (5)	50	Loss	4–6, 6–7^{(7–9)}
Adelaide International; Adelaide, Australia; WTA 500; Hard, outdoor; 6 January 2025 – 11 January 2025	4	1R	(Brazil) Beatriz Haddad Maia	16	Win	6–2, 6–1
Adelaide International; Adelaide, Australia; WTA 500; Hard, outdoor; 6 January 2025 – 11 January 2025	5	2R	(Latvia) Jeļena Ostapenko (8)	17	Win	3–6, 6–4, 6–3
Adelaide International; Adelaide, Australia; WTA 500; Hard, outdoor; 6 January 2025 – 11 January 2025	6	QF	Daria Kasatkina (Note: Russian and Belarus players are not allowed to compete under the name or flag of their country following the Russian invasion of Ukraine.) (3)	9	Win	6–1, 6–3
Adelaide International; Adelaide, Australia; WTA 500; Hard, outdoor; 6 January 2025 – 11 January 2025	7	SF	Liudmila Samsonova	26	Win	5–7, 7–5, 3–0 ret.
Adelaide International; Adelaide, Australia; WTA 500; Hard, outdoor; 6 January 2025 – 11 January 2025	8	W	(United States) Jessica Pegula (1)	7	Win (1)	6–3, 4–6, 6–1
Australian Open; Melbourne, Australia; Grand Slam; Hard, outdoor; 12 January 2025 – 26 January 2025	9	1R	(United States) Ann Li	84	Win	6–4, 7–5
Australian Open; Melbourne, Australia; Grand Slam; Hard, outdoor; 12 January 2025 – 26 January 2025	10	2R	(Romania) Elena-Gabriela Ruse (Q)	125	Win	7–6^{(7–1)}, 2–6, 7–5
Australian Open; Melbourne, Australia; Grand Slam; Hard, outdoor; 12 January 2025 – 26 January 2025	11	3R	(United States) Danielle Collins (10)	11	Win	6–4, 6–4
Australian Open; Melbourne, Australia; Grand Slam; Hard, outdoor; 12 January 2025 – 26 January 2025	12	4R	(Kazakhstan) Elena Rybakina (6)	7	Win	6–3, 1–6, 6–3
Australian Open; Melbourne, Australia; Grand Slam; Hard, outdoor; 12 January 2025 – 26 January 2025	13	QF	(Ukraine) Elina Svitolina (28)	27	Win	3–6, 6–3, 6–4
Australian Open; Melbourne, Australia; Grand Slam; Hard, outdoor; 12 January 2025 – 26 January 2025	14	SF	(Poland) Iga Świątek (2)	2	Win	5–7, 6–1, 7–6^{(10–8)}
Australian Open; Melbourne, Australia; Grand Slam; Hard, outdoor; 12 January 2025 – 26 January 2025	15	W	Aryna Sabalenka (1)	1	Win (2)	6–3, 2–6, 7–5
Indian Wells Open; Indian Wells, United States; WTA 1000; Hard, outdoor; 5 March 2025 – 16 March 2025	–	1R	Bye			
Indian Wells Open; Indian Wells, United States; WTA 1000; Hard, outdoor; 5 March 2025 – 16 March 2025	16	2R	Anastasia Potapova	34	Win	6–3, 6–0
Indian Wells Open; Indian Wells, United States; WTA 1000; Hard, outdoor; 5 March 2025 – 16 March 2025	17	3R	(Belgium) Elise Mertens (28)	28	Win	6–2, 6–7^{(8–10)}, 6–4
Indian Wells Open; Indian Wells, United States; WTA 1000; Hard, outdoor; 5 March 2025 – 16 March 2025	18	4R	(Croatia) Donna Vekić (19)	22	Win	4–6, 7–6^{(9–7)}, 6–3
Indian Wells Open; Indian Wells, United States; WTA 1000; Hard, outdoor; 5 March 2025 – 16 March 2025	19	QF	(Switzerland) Belinda Bencic (WC)	58	Win	6–1, 6–1
Indian Wells Open; Indian Wells, United States; WTA 1000; Hard, outdoor; 5 March 2025 – 16 March 2025	20	SF	Aryna Sabalenka (1)	1	Loss	0–6, 1–6
Miami Open; Miami Gardens, United States; WTA 1000; Hard, outdoor; 18 March 2025 – 30 March 2025	–	1R	Bye			
Miami Open; Miami Gardens, United States; WTA 1000; Hard, outdoor; 18 March 2025 – 30 March 2025	21	2R	(Armenia) Elina Avanesyan	36	Win	6–3, 6–3
Miami Open; Miami Gardens, United States; WTA 1000; Hard, outdoor; 18 March 2025 – 30 March 2025	22	3R	(Philippines) Alexandra Eala (WC)	140	Loss	4–6, 2–6
Charleston Open; Charleston, United States; WTA 500; Clay, outdoor; 31 March 2025 – 6 April 2025	–	1R	Bye			
Charleston Open; Charleston, United States; WTA 500; Clay, outdoor; 31 March 2025 – 6 April 2025	23	2R	(United States) Caroline Dolehide	73	Win	6–3, 7–6^{(7–4)}
Charleston Open; Charleston, United States; WTA 500; Clay, outdoor; 31 March 2025 – 6 April 2025	24	3R	Anna Kalinskaya (14)	33	Loss	2–6, 4–6
Madrid Open; Madrid, Spain; WTA 1000; Clay, outdoor; 22 April 2025 – 4 May 2025	–	1R	Bye			
Madrid Open; Madrid, Spain; WTA 1000; Clay, outdoor; 22 April 2025 – 4 May 2025	25	2R	(Italy) Lucia Bronzetti	59	Win	6–4, 6–3
Madrid Open; Madrid, Spain; WTA 1000; Clay, outdoor; 22 April 2025 – 4 May 2025	26	3R	Anna Kalinskaya (30)	29	Win	7–5, 7–6^{(7–3)}
Madrid Open; Madrid, Spain; WTA 1000; Clay, outdoor; 22 April 2025 – 4 May 2025	27	4R	(Croatia) Donna Vekić (19)	21	Win	6–2, 6–3
Madrid Open; Madrid, Spain; WTA 1000; Clay, outdoor; 22 April 2025 – 4 May 2025	28	QF	(Poland) Iga Świątek (2)	2	Loss	6–0, 3–6, 2–6
Italian Open; Rome, Italy; WTA 1000; Clay, outdoor; 6 May 2025 – 18 May 2025	–	1R	Bye			
Italian Open; Rome, Italy; WTA 1000; Clay, outdoor; 6 May 2025 – 18 May 2025	29	2R	(France) Varvara Gracheva	65	Win	7–6^{(7–4)}, 6–1
Italian Open; Rome, Italy; WTA 1000; Clay, outdoor; 6 May 2025 – 18 May 2025	30	3R	(United States) Peyton Stearns	42	Loss	6–2, 2–6, 6–7^{(3–7)}
French Open; Paris, France; Grand Slam; Clay, outdoor; 25 May 2025 – 8 June 2025	31	1R	(Australia) Daria Saville (Q)	137	Win	6–2, 6–1
French Open; Paris, France; Grand Slam; Clay, outdoor; 25 May 2025 – 8 June 2025	32	2R	(United Kingdom) Katie Boulter	38	Win	6–1, 6–3
French Open; Paris, France; Grand Slam; Clay, outdoor; 25 May 2025 – 8 June 2025	33	3R	(United States) Sofia Kenin (31)	30	Win	4–6, 6–3, 7–5
French Open; Paris, France; Grand Slam; Clay, outdoor; 25 May 2025 – 8 June 2025	34	4R	(United States) Hailey Baptiste	70	Win	6–3, 7–5
French Open; Paris, France; Grand Slam; Clay, outdoor; 25 May 2025 – 8 June 2025	35	QF	(United States) Coco Gauff (2)	2	Loss	7–6^{(8–6)}, 4–6, 1–6
Queen's Club Championships; London, United Kingdom; WTA 500; Grass, outdoor; 9 June 2025 – 15 June 2025	–	1R	Bye			
Queen's Club Championships; London, United Kingdom; WTA 500; Grass, outdoor; 9 June 2025 – 15 June 2025	36	2R	Anastasia Zakharova (Q)	111	Win	6–3, 6–2
Queen's Club Championships; London, United Kingdom; WTA 500; Grass, outdoor; 9 June 2025 – 15 June 2025	37	QF	Diana Shnaider (5)	12	Win	2–6, 6–3, 6–4
Queen's Club Championships; London, United Kingdom; WTA 500; Grass, outdoor; 9 June 2025 – 15 June 2025	38	SF	(Germany) Tatjana Maria (Q)	86	Loss	3–6, 6–7^{(3–7)}
Berlin Tennis Open; Berlin, Germany; WTA 500; Grass, outdoor; 16 June 2025 – 22 June 2025	39	1R	(Czech Republic) Markéta Vondroušová (PR)	164	Loss	5–7, 6–7^{(6–8)}
Wimbledon; London, United Kingdom; Grand Slam; Grass, outdoor; 30 June 2025 – 13 July 2025	40	1R	(Romania) Elena-Gabriela Ruse	58	Win	6–7^{(4–7)}, 7–5, 7–5
Wimbledon; London, United Kingdom; Grand Slam; Grass, outdoor; 30 June 2025 – 13 July 2025	41	2R	(Serbia) Olga Danilović	37	Win	6–4, 6–2
Wimbledon; London, United Kingdom; Grand Slam; Grass, outdoor; 30 June 2025 – 13 July 2025	42	3R	(Germany) Laura Siegemund	104	Loss	3–6, 3–6
Canadian Open; Montreal, Canada; WTA 1000; Hard, outdoor; 27 July 2025 – 7 August 2025	–	1R	Bye			
Canadian Open; Montreal, Canada; WTA 1000; Hard, outdoor; 27 July 2025 – 7 August 2025	43	2R	(Germany) Laura Siegemund (Q)	54	Win	6–2, 6–1
Canadian Open; Montreal, Canada; WTA 1000; Hard, outdoor; 27 July 2025 – 7 August 2025	44	3R	(United States) Caty McNally (PR)	116	Win	2–6, 6–3, 6–3
Canadian Open; Montreal, Canada; WTA 1000; Hard, outdoor; 27 July 2025 – 7 August 2025	45	4R	(Czech Republic) Karolína Muchová (11)	14	Win	4–6, 6–3, 7–5
Canadian Open; Montreal, Canada; WTA 1000; Hard, outdoor; 27 July 2025 – 7 August 2025	46	QF	(Denmark) Clara Tauson (16)	19	Loss	1–6, 4–6
Cincinnati Open; Mason, United States; WTA 1000; Hard, outdoor; 7 August 2025 – 18 August 2025	–	1R	Bye			
Cincinnati Open; Mason, United States; WTA 1000; Hard, outdoor; 7 August 2025 – 18 August 2025	47	2R	(Germany) Eva Lys	62	Win	1–6, 6–3, 7–6^{(7–1)}
Cincinnati Open; Mason, United States; WTA 1000; Hard, outdoor; 7 August 2025 – 18 August 2025	48	3R	(Japan) Aoi Ito (Q)	94	Win	6–4, 6–0
Cincinnati Open; Mason, United States; WTA 1000; Hard, outdoor; 7 August 2025 – 18 August 2025	49	4R	(Kazakhstan) Elena Rybakina (9)	10	Loss	7–6^{(7–3)}, 4–6, 2–6
US Open; New York City, United States; Grand Slam; Hard, outdoor; 24 August 2025 – 7 September 2025	50	1R	(Mexico) Renata Zarazúa	82	Loss	7–6^{(12–10)}, 6–7^{(3–7)}, 5–7
WTA Finals; Riyadh, Saudi Arabia; Year-end championships; Hard, indoor; 1 November 2025 – 8 November 2025	51	RR	(Poland) Iga Świątek (2)	2	Loss	1–6, 2–6
WTA Finals; Riyadh, Saudi Arabia; Year-end championships; Hard, indoor; 1 November 2025 – 8 November 2025	52	RR	(United States) Amanda Anisimova (4)	4	Loss	6–4, 3–6, 2–6
WTA Finals; Riyadh, Saudi Arabia; Year-end championships; Hard, indoor; 1 November 2025 – 8 November 2025	–	RR	(Kazakhstan) Elena Rybakina (6)	6	Withdrew	—N/a

=== Doubles matches ===
Tournament	Match	Round	Opponent	Rank	Result	Score
Madrid Open; Madrid, Spain; WTA 1000; Clay, outdoor; 22 April 2025 – 4 May 2025; Partner: (Greece) Maria Sakkari	1	1R	(Poland) Magda Linette / (Slovakia) Rebecca Šramková	95 / 475	Win	7–6^{(7–3)}, 4–6, [10–6]
Madrid Open; Madrid, Spain; WTA 1000; Clay, outdoor; 22 April 2025 – 4 May 2025; Partner: (Greece) Maria Sakkari	2	2R	(United States) Sofia Kenin / (Ukraine) Lyudmyla Kichenok (8)	38 / 9	Loss	3–6, 4–6
Canadian Open; Montreal, Canada; WTA 1000; Hard, outdoor; 27 July 2025 – 7 August 2025; Partner: (United States) Jessica Pegula	3	1R	(United States) Peyton Stearns / (Czech Republic) Markéta Vondroušová (WC)	53 / 362	Loss	6–3, 2–6, [5–10]

=== Mixed doubles matches ===
Tournament	Match	Round	Opponent	Combined Rank	Result	Score
US Open; New York City, United States; Grand Slam; Hard, outdoor; 24 August 2025 – 7 September 2025; Partner: (United States) Frances Tiafoe	1	1R	(Poland) Iga Świątek / (Norway) Casper Ruud	14	Loss	1–4, 2–4

== Schedule ==
Per Madison Keys, this is her current 2025 schedule (subject to change).

=== Singles schedule ===
Key
W	F	SF	QF	#R	RR

(W) winner; (F) finalist; (SF) semifinalist; (QF) quarterfinalist; (#R) rounds 4, 3, 2, 1; (RR) round-robin stage.

Date	Tournament	Location	Tier	Surface	Prev. result	Prev. points	New points	Result
30 December 2024 – 5 January 2025	WTA Auckland Open	New Zealand	WTA 250	Hard	A	0	54	Quarterfinals lost to (Denmark) Clara Tauson; 4–6, 6–7^{(7–9)}
6 January 2025 – 11 January 2025	Adelaide International	Australia	WTA 500	Hard	A	0	500	Winner defeated (United States) Jessica Pegula; 6–3, 4–6, 6–1
12 January 2025– 26 January 2025	Australian Open	Australia	Grand Slam	Hard	A	0	2000	Winner defeated Aryna Sabalenka; 6–3, 2–6, 7–5
5 March 2025 – 16 March 2025	Indian Wells Open	United States	WTA 1000	Hard	3R	65	390	Semifinals lost to Aryna Sabalenka; 0–6, 1–6
18 March 2025 – 30 March 2025	Miami Open	United States	WTA 1000	Hard	4R	120	65	Third round lost to (Philippines) Alexandra Eala; 4–6, 2–6
31 March 2025 – 6 April 2025	Charleston Open	United States	WTA 500	Clay	2R	1	60	Third round lost to Anna Kalinskaya; 2–6, 4–6
22 April 2025 – 4 May 2025	Madrid Open	Spain	WTA 1000	Clay	SF	390	215	Quarterfinals lost to (Poland) Iga Świątek; 6–0, 3–6, 2–6
7 May 2025 – 18 May 2025	Italian Open	Italy	WTA 1000	Clay	QF	215	65	Third round lost to (United States) Peyton Stearns; 6–2, 2–6, 6–7^{(3–7)}
18 May 2025 – 24 May 2025	Internationaux de Strasbourg	France	WTA 500	Clay	W	500	0	Withdrew
26 May 2025 – 9 June 2025	French Open	France	Grand Slam	Clay	3R	130	430	Quarterfinals lost to (United States) Coco Gauff; 7–6^{(8–6)}, 4–6, 1–6
9 June 2025 – 15 June 2025	Queen's Club Championships	United Kingdom	WTA 500	Grass	NH	0	195	Semifinals lost to (Germany) Tatjana Maria; 3–6, 6–7^{(3–7)}
16 June 2025 – 22 June 2025	German Open	Germany	WTA 500	Grass	A	0	1	First round lost to (Czech Republic) Markéta Vondroušová; 5–7, 6–7^{(6–8)}
23 June 2025 – 28 June 2025	Eastbourne Open	United Kingdom	WTA 250	Grass	SF	195	0	Withdrew
30 June 2025 – 13 July 2025	Wimbledon Championships	United Kingdom	Grand Slam	Grass	4R	240	130	Third round lost to (Germany) Laura Siegemund; 3–6, 3–6
27 July 2025 – 7 August 2025	Canadian Open	Canada	WTA 1000	Hard	2R	10	215	Quarterfinals lost to (Denmark) Clara Tauson; 1–6, 4–6
7 August 2025 – 18 August 2025	Cincinnati Open	United States	WTA 1000	Hard	A	0	120	Fourth round lost to (Kazakhstan) Elena Rybakina; 7–6^{(7–3)}, 4–6, 2–6
24 August 2025 – 7 September 2025	US Open	United States	Grand Slam	Hard	3R	130	10	First round lost to (Mexico) Renata Zarazúa; 7–6^{(12–10)}, 6–7^{(3–7)}, 5–7
24 September 2025 – 5 October 2025	China Open	China	WTA 1000	Hard	4R	120	0	Withdrew
6 October 2025 – 12 October 2025	Wuhan Open	China	WTA 1000	Hard	1R	10	0	Withdrew
1 November 2025 – 8 November 2025	WTA Finals	Saudi Arabia	WTA Finals	Hard	A	0	0	Round robin withdrew against (Kazakhstan) Elena Rybakina; 2 losses
Total year-end points						2126	4335	▲2209

== Yearly records ==
=== Head-to-head match-ups ===
Keys has a 37–15 (71%) WTA match win–loss record in the 2025 season. Her record against players who were part of the WTA rankings top ten at the time of their meetings is 5–6 (45%). Bold indicates player was ranked top 10 at the time of at least one meeting. The following list is ordered by number of wins:

- (Italy) Lucia Bronzetti 2–0
- (Romania) Elena-Gabriela Ruse 2–0
- (Croatia) Donna Vekić 2–0
- (Armenia) Elina Avanesyan 1–0
- (United States) Hailey Baptiste 1–0
- (Switzerland) Belinda Bencic 1–0
- (United Kingdom) Katie Boulter 1–0
- (United States) Danielle Collins 1–0
- (Romania) Jaqueline Cristian 1–0
- (Serbia) Olga Danilović 1–0
- (United States) Caroline Dolehide 1–0
- (Brazil) Beatriz Haddad Maia 1–0
- (France) Varvara Gracheva 1–0
- (Japan) Aoi Ito 1–0
- **Daria Kasatkina** 1–0
- (United States) Sofia Kenin 1–0
- (United States) Ann Li 1–0
- (Germany) Eva Lys 1–0
- (United States) Caty McNally 1–0
- (Belgium) Elise Mertens 1–0
- (Czech Republic) Karolína Muchová 1–0
- (Latvia) Jeļena Ostapenko 1–0
- (United States) **Jessica Pegula** 1–0
- Anastasia Potapova 1–0
- Liudmila Samsonova 1–0
- (Australia) Daria Saville 1–0
- Diana Shnaider 1–0
- (Ukraine) Elina Svitolina 1–0
- Anastasia Zakharova 1–0
- Anna Kalinskaya 1–1
- (Kazakhstan) **Elena Rybakina** 1–1
- **Aryna Sabalenka** 1–1
- (Germany) Laura Siegemund 1–1
- (Poland) **Iga Świątek** 1–2
- (United States) **Amanda Anisimova** 0–1
- (Philippines) Alexandra Eala 0–1
- (United States) **Coco Gauff** 0–1
- (Germany) Tatjana Maria 0–1
- (United States) Peyton Stearns 0–1
- (Czech Republic) Markéta Vondroušová 0–1
- (Mexico) Renata Zarazúa 0–1
- (Denmark) Clara Tauson 0–2

=== Top 10 record ===
Result	W–L	Opponent	Rk	Tournament	Surface	Rd	Score	Rk	Ref
Win	1–0	Daria Kasatkina	9	Adelaide International, Australia	Hard	QF	6–1, 6–3	20	
Win	2–0	(United States) Jessica Pegula	7	Adelaide International, Australia	Hard	F	6–3, 4–6, 6–1	20	
Win	3–0	(Kazakhstan) Elena Rybakina	7	Australian Open, Australia	Hard	4R	6–3, 1–6, 6–3	14	
Win	4–0	(Poland) Iga Świątek	2	Australian Open, Australia	Hard	SF	5–7, 6–1, 7–6^{(10–8)}	14	
Win	5–0	Aryna Sabalenka	**1**	Australian Open, Australia	Hard	F	6–3, 2–6, 7–5	14	
Loss	5–1	Aryna Sabalenka	**1**	Indian Wells Open, United States	Hard	SF	0–6, 1–6	5	
Loss	5–2	(Poland) Iga Świątek	2	Madrid Open, Spain	Clay	QF	6–0, 3–6, 2–6	5	
Loss	5–3	(United States) Coco Gauff	2	French Open, France	Clay	QF	7–6^{(8–6)}, 4–6, 1–6	8	
Loss	5–4	(Kazakhstan) Elena Rybakina	10	Cincinnati Open, United States	Hard	4R	7–6^{(7–3)}, 4–6, 2–6	6	
Loss	5–5	(Poland) Iga Świątek	2	WTA Finals, Saudi Arabia	Hard (i)	RR	1–6, 2–6	7	
Loss	5–6	(United States) Amanda Anisimova	4	WTA Finals, Saudi Arabia	Hard (i)	RR	6–4, 3–6, 2–6	7	

- Key: (Rk) first use, opponent rank; (Rd) round; (Rk) 2nd use, player rank; (Ref) reference; (F) final; (SF) semifinal; (QF) quarterfinal; (#R) rounds 4, 3, 2, 1; (RR) round-robin stage; (Q#) qualifying rounds or stages (3), 2, 1.

=== Finals ===
==== Singles: 2 (2 titles) ====
Legend Grand Slam tournaments (1–0) WTA Tour Championships (0–0) WTA 1000 (0–0) WTA 500 (1–0)	Finals by surface Hard (2–0) Clay (0–0) Grass (0–0)	Finals by setting Outdoor (2–0) Indoor (0–0)

Result	W–L	Date	Tournament	Tier	Surface	Opponent	Score
Win	1–0	Jan 2025	Adelaide International, Australia	WTA 500	Hard	(United States) Jessica Pegula	6–3, 4–6, 6–1
Win	2–0	Jan 2025	Australian Open, Australia	Grand Slam	Hard	Aryna Sabalenka	6–3, 2–6, 7–5

=== Earnings ===
- **Bold** font denotes tournament win

**Singles**
Event	Prize money	Year-to-date
WTA Auckland Open	$6,815	$6,815
**Adelaide International**	**$164,000**	$170,815
**Australian Open**	**A$3,500,000**	$2,379,924
Indian Wells Open	$333,125	$2,713,049
Miami Open	$60,400	$2,773,449
Charleston Open	$12,900	$2,786,349
Madrid Open	$189,075	$2,975,424
Italian Open	$44,057	$3,019,481
French Open	€440,000	$3,495,879
Queen's Club Championships	$59,100	$3,554,979
German Open	$10,190	$3,565,169
Wimbledon Championships	£152,000	$3,771,209
Canadian Open	$107,000	$3,878,209
Cincinnati Open	$56,678	$3,934,887
US Open	$110,000	$4,044,887
WTA Finals	$280,000	$4,324,887
		$4,324,887
**Doubles**
Event	Prize money	Year-to-date
Madrid Open	$17,425	$17,425
Canadian Open	$5,475	$22,900
		$22,900
**Mixed Doubles**
Event	Prize money	Year-to-date
US Open	$10,000	$10,000
		$10,000
**Total**
		**$4,357,787**

Figures in United States dollars (USD) unless noted.

== See also ==
- 2025 Coco Gauff tennis season
- 2025 Aryna Sabalenka tennis season
- 2025 Iga Świątek tennis season
- 2025 Elena Rybakina tennis season
