= 2025 Adelaide International – Men's singles =

Men's singles
- 2025 Adelaide International

Final
- Champion: (Canada) Félix Auger-Aliassime
- Runner-up: (United States) Sebastian Korda
- Score: 6–3, 3–6, 6–1

Details
- Draw: 28 (4 Q / 3 WC )
- Seeds: 8

Events
Singles	men	women
Doubles	men	women
- Adelaide International

Félix Auger-Aliassime defeated Sebastian Korda in the final, 6–3, 3–6, 6–1 to win the men's singles tennis title at the 2025 Adelaide International. It was his sixth ATP Tour singles title and his first outside of indoor hardcourts.

Jiří Lehečka was the reigning champion, but withdrew before the start of the tournament.

== Seeds ==
The top four seeds received a bye into the second round.

1. (United States) Tommy Paul (semifinals)
2. (United States) Sebastian Korda (final)
3. (Czech Republic) Tomáš Macháč (withdrew)
4. (Czech Republic) Jiří Lehečka (withdrew)
5. (Canada) Félix Auger-Aliassime (champion)
6. (Kazakhstan) Alexander Bublik (first round)
7. (United States) Brandon Nakashima (second round)
8. (Argentina) Tomás Martín Etcheverry (second round)
9. (China) Zhang Zhizhen (first round)

== Draw ==
Key

- Q = Qualifier
- WC = Wild card
- LL = Lucky loser
- Alt = Alternate
- ITF = ITF entry
- PR = Protected ranking
- SR = Special ranking
- SE = Special exempt
- JE = Junior exempt
- JR = Junior Accelerator Programme entrant
- CO = College Accelerator Programme entrant
- NG = Next Gen Accelerator Program entrant
- w/o = Walkover
- r = Retired
- d = Defaulted

=== Finals ===
Semifinals
1	(United States) Tommy Paul	6^{3}	6	4
5	(Canada) Félix Auger-Aliassime	7^{7}	3	6
(Serbia) Miomir Kecmanović	3	6^{4}
2	(United States) Sebastian Korda	6	7^{7}

Final
5	(Canada) Félix Auger-Aliassime	6	3	6
2	(United States) Sebastian Korda	3	6	1

=== Top half ===
First round
LL	(France) M Guinard	7^{7}	2	6
R Safiullin	6^{4}	6	1
(Belgium) D Goffin	1	2
LL	(Australia) R Hijikata	6	6
Q	(Germany) Y Hanfmann	1	6	3
7	(United States) B Nakashima	6	2	6
(France) A Cazaux	7	6
Q	(Australia) A Walton	5	1
(Australia) A Vukic	2	6	3
(United States) M Giron	6	3	6
(Canada) D Shapovalov	6	6
9	(China) Z Zhang	3	4

Second round
1	(United States) T Paul	6	3	6
LL	(France) M Guinard	4	6	3
LL	(Australia) R Hijikata	6	3	7^{7}
7	(United States) B Nakashima	2	6	6^{5}
5	(Canada) F Auger-Aliassime	1	6	7
(France) A Cazaux	6	4	5
(United States) M Giron	7	6
(Canada) D Shapovalov	5	2

Quarterfinals
1	(United States) T Paul	6	6
LL	(Australia) R Hijikata	3	4
5	(Canada) F Auger-Aliassime	7^{7}	6
(United States) M Giron	6^{3}	3

Semifinals
1	(United States) T Paul	6^{3}	6	4
5	(Canada) F Auger-Aliassime	7^{7}	3	6

=== Bottom half ===
First round
6	(Kazakhstan) A Bublik	4	2
(Serbia) M Kecmanović	6	6
(France) A Rinderknech	5	6^{5}
(Australia) C O'Connell	7	7^{7}
Q	(Australia) J Duckworth	1	5
WC	(Australia) L Tu	6	7
8	(Argentina) TM Etcheverry	7^{10}	6
WC	(Australia) T Schoolkate	6^{8}	3
(Japan) Y Nishioka	3	6	3
WC	(Australia) T Kokkinakis	6	3	6
(Spain) R Bautista Agut	5	2
(Spain) A Davidovich Fokina	7	6

Second round
(Serbia) M Kecmanović	7^{7}	6
(Australia) C O'Connell	6^{1}	2
WC	(Australia) L Tu	3	3
Q	(France) B Bonzi	6	6
8	(Argentina) TM Etcheverry	5	6	6^{4}
WC	(Australia) T Kokkinakis	7	4	7^{7}
(Spain) A Davidovich Fokina	3	3
2	(United States) S Korda	6	6

Quarterfinals
(Serbia) M Kecmanović	6	6
Q	(France) B Bonzi	2	3
WC	(Australia) T Kokkinakis
2	(United States) S Korda	w/o

Semifinals
(Serbia) M Kecmanović	3	6^{4}
2	(United States) S Korda	6	7^{7}

== Qualifying ==
=== Seeds ===
1. (Japan) Yoshihito Nishioka (moved to main draw)
2. (France) Quentin Halys (first round, retired)
3. (Australia) Rinky Hijikata (qualifying competition, lucky loser)
4. (France) Benjamin Bonzi (qualified)
5. (France) Hugo Gaston (first round)
6. (Serbia) Dušan Lajović (first round)
7. (Australia) James Duckworth (qualified)
8. (Bosnia and Herzegovina) Damir Džumhur (first round)

=== Qualifiers ===
1. (Germany) Yannick Hanfmann
2. (Australia) James Duckworth
3. (Australia) Adam Walton
4. (France) Benjamin Bonzi

=== Lucky losers ===
1. (Australia) Rinky Hijikata
2. (France) Manuel Guinard

=== Qualifying draw ===
==== First qualifier ====
First round
Alt	(France) Manuel Guinard	7	6
(Japan) Taro Daniel	5	4
(Germany) Yannick Hanfmann	3	7^{7}	6
5	(France) Hugo Gaston	6	6^{2}	2

Qualifying competition
Alt	(France) Manuel Guinard	6^{1}	3
(Germany) Yannick Hanfmann	7^{7}	6

==== Second qualifier ====
First round
2	(France) Quentin Halys	2^{r}
WC	(Australia) Jacob Bradshaw	2
Pavel Kotov	6^{3}	7^{9}	6^{5}
7	(Australia) James Duckworth	7^{7}	6^{7}	7^{7}

Qualifying competition
WC	(Australia) Jacob Bradshaw	2	2
7	(Australia) James Duckworth	6	6

==== Third qualifier ====
First round
3	(Australia) Rinky Hijikata	6	2
Alt	(Australia) Omar Jasika	0	1^{r}
(Australia) Adam Walton	6	4	6
6	(Serbia) Dušan Lajović	4	6	3

Qualifying competition
3	(Australia) Rinky Hijikata	6	6^{4}	4
(Australia) Adam Walton	1	7^{7}	6

==== Fourth qualifier ====
First round
4	(France) Benjamin Bonzi	3
(Italy) Fabio Fognini	2^{r}
WC	(Australia) James McCabe	6	3	7
8	(Bosnia and Herzegovina) Damir Džumhur	4	6	5

Qualifying competition
4	(France) Benjamin Bonzi	6	4	6
WC	(Australia) James McCabe	3	6	3
