= 2025 Adelaide International – Men's doubles =

Men's doubles
- 2025 Adelaide International

Final
- Champions: (Italy) Simone Bolelli (Italy) Andrea Vavassori
- Runners-up: (Germany) Kevin Krawietz (Germany) Tim Pütz
- Score: 4–6, 7–6^{(7–4)}, [11–9]

Details
- Draw: 24
- Seeds: 8

Events
Singles	men	women
Doubles	men	women
- Adelaide International

Simone Bolelli and Andrea Vavassori defeated Kevin Krawietz and Tim Pütz in the final, 4–6, 7–6^{(7–4)}, [11–9] to win the men's doubles title at the 2025 Adelaide International.

Rajeev Ram and Joe Salisbury were the reigning champions, but Ram chose to compete in Auckland instead. Salisbury partnered Neal Skupski, but lost in the second round to Petr Nouza and Patrik Rikl.

== Seeds ==
All seeds received a bye into the second round.

1. (El Salvador) Marcelo Arévalo / (Croatia) Mate Pavić (semifinals)
2. (Germany) Kevin Krawietz / (Germany) Tim Pütz (final)
3. (Italy) Simone Bolelli / (Italy) Andrea Vavassori (champions)
4. (Finland) Harri Heliövaara / (United Kingdom) Henry Patten (semifinals)
5. (United States) Nathaniel Lammons / (United States) Jackson Withrow (second round)
6. (Australia) Matthew Ebden / (Belgium) Joran Vliegen (quarterfinals)
7. (United Kingdom) Joe Salisbury / (United Kingdom) Neal Skupski (second round)
8. (Belgium) Sander Gillé / (Poland) Jan Zieliński (second round)

== Draw ==
Key

- Q = Qualifier
- WC = Wild card
- LL = Lucky loser
- Alt = Alternate
- ITF = ITF entry
- PR = Protected ranking
- SR = Special ranking
- SE = Special exempt
- JE = Junior exempt
- JR = Junior Accelerator Programme entrant
- CO = College Accelerator Programme entrant
- NG = Next Gen Accelerator Program entrant
- w/o = Walkover
- r = Retired
- d = Defaulted

=== Finals ===
Semifinals
1	(El Salvador) Marcelo Arévalo (Croatia) Mate Pavić	6	6^{3}	[8]
3	(Italy) Simone Bolelli (Italy) Andrea Vavassori	4	7^{7}	[10]
4	(Finland) Harri Heliövaara (United Kingdom) Henry Patten	6^{4}	5
2	(Germany) Kevin Krawietz (Germany) Tim Pütz	7^{7}	7

Final
3	(Italy) Simone Bolelli (Italy) Andrea Vavassori	4	7^{7}	[11]
2	(Germany) Kevin Krawietz (Germany) Tim Pütz	6	6^{4}	[9]

=== Top half ===
First round
(United Kingdom) J Murray (Australia) J Peers	6	4	[7]
(Brazil) R Matos (Brazil) M Melo	3	6	[10]
(Czech Republic) A Pavlásek (Netherlands) J-J Rojer	3	6^{5}
(Monaco) H Nys (France) É Roger-Vasselin	6	7^{7}
(Ecuador) G Escobar (Australia) J-P Smith	6^{4}	6	[8]
WC	(Australia) T Fancutt (Australia) MC Romios	7^{7}	3	[10]
(France) M Guinard (France) A Rinderknech	4	7^{8}	[4]
(Argentina) G Andreozzi (France) T Arribagé	6	6^{6}	[10]

Second round
1	(El Salvador) M Arévalo (Croatia) M Pavić	2	6	[10]
(Brazil) R Matos (Brazil) M Melo	6	1	[2]
(Monaco) H Nys (France) É Roger-Vasselin	6	7
5	(United States) N Lammons (United States) J Withrow	3	5
3	(Italy) S Bolelli (Italy) A Vavassori	7^{7}	6
WC	(Australia) T Fancutt (Australia) MC Romios	6^{2}	3
(Argentina) G Andreozzi (France) T Arribagé	2	4
6	(Australia) M Ebden (Belgium) J Vliegen	6	6

Quarterfinals
1	(El Salvador) M Arévalo (Croatia) M Pavić	7^{9}	6
(Monaco) H Nys (France) É Roger-Vasselin	6^{7}	2
3	(Italy) S Bolelli (Italy) A Vavassori	7^{7}	7^{7}
6	(Australia) M Ebden (Belgium) J Vliegen	6^{5}	6^{5}

Semifinals
1	(El Salvador) M Arévalo (Croatia) M Pavić	6	6^{3}	[8]
3	(Italy) S Bolelli (Italy) A Vavassori	4	7^{7}	[10]

=== Bottom half ===
First round
WC	(Australia) L Saville (Australia) L Tu	4	4
(Croatia) I Dodig (Tunisia) S Mansouri	6	6
(India) S Balaji (Mexico) MÁ Reyes-Varela	4	6	[10]
(Colombia) N Barrientos (India) R Bopanna	6	2	[7]
Alt	(Czech Republic) P Nouza (Czech Republic) P Rikl	1	7^{15}	[10]
(Netherlands) R Haase (Kazakhstan) A Nedovyesov	6	6^{13}	[7]
(France) G Jacq (Brazil) O Luz	6^{5}	4
(Sweden) A Göransson (Netherlands) S Verbeek	7^{7}	6

Second round
8	(Belgium) S Gillé (Poland) J Zieliński	5	6^{6}
(Croatia) I Dodig (Tunisia) S Mansouri	7	7^{8}
(India) S Balaji (Mexico) MÁ Reyes-Varela	6	3	[11]
4	(Finland) H Heliövaara (United Kingdom) H Patten	3	6	[13]
7	(United Kingdom) J Salisbury (United Kingdom) N Skupski	6^{11}	2
Alt	(Czech Republic) P Nouza (Czech Republic) P Rikl	7^{13}	6
(Sweden) A Göransson (Netherlands) S Verbeek	5	7	[7]
2	(Germany) K Krawietz (Germany) T Pütz	7	5	[10]

Quarterfinals
(Croatia) I Dodig (Tunisia) S Mansouri	3	1
4	(Finland) H Heliövaara (United Kingdom) H Patten	6	6
Alt	(Czech Republic) P Nouza (Czech Republic) P Rikl	6^{2}	4
2	(Germany) K Krawietz (Germany) T Pütz	7^{7}	6

Semifinals
4	(Finland) H Heliövaara (United Kingdom) H Patten	6^{4}	5
2	(Germany) K Krawietz (Germany) T Pütz	7^{7}	7
