= 2025 Adelaide International – Women's doubles =

Women's doubles
- 2025 Adelaide International

Final
- Champions: (China) Guo Hanyu; Alexandra Panova
- Runners-up: (Brazil) Beatriz Haddad Maia (Germany) Laura Siegemund
- Score: 7–5, 6–4

Events
Singles	men	women
Doubles	men	women
← 2024 ·	Adelaide International	· 2026 →

Guo Hanyu and Alexandra Panova defeated the defending champion Beatriz Haddad Maia and her partner Laura Siegemund in the final, 7–5, 6–4 to win the women's doubles tennis title at the 2025 Adelaide International.

Haddad Maia and Taylor Townsend were the reigning champions, but Townsend chose not to participate this year.

== Seeds ==
1. (Chinese Taipei) Hsieh Su-wei / (Latvia) Jeļena Ostapenko (first round)
2. (Australia) Ellen Perez / (Czech Republic) Kateřina Siniaková (semifinals)
3. (Chinese Taipei) Chan Hao-ching / (Ukraine) Lyudmyla Kichenok (first round)
4. (United States) Asia Muhammad / (Netherlands) Demi Schuurs (first round)

== Draw ==
=== Key ===
- Q = Qualifier
- WC = Wild card
- LL = Lucky loser
- Alt = Alternate
- ITF = ITF entry
- PR = Protected ranking
- SR = Special ranking
- SE = Special exempt
- JE = Junior exempt
- JR = Junior Accelerator Programme entrant
- CO = College Accelerator Programme entrant
- NG = Next Gen Accelerator Program entrant
- w/o = Walkover
- r = Retired
- d = Defaulted

=== Draw ===
First round
1	(Chinese Taipei) S-w Hsieh (Latvia) J Ostapenko	3	5
(United States) A Krueger (United States) J Pegula	6	7
WC	(Australia) G Da Silva-Fick (Australia) O Gadecki	1	1
(Kazakhstan) A Danilina; I Khromacheva	6	6
3	(Chinese Taipei) H-c Chan (Ukraine) L Kichenok	4	0
(Brazil) B Haddad Maia (Germany) L Siegemund	6	6
(Canada) L Fernandez (Ukraine) N Kichenok	1	4
(United States) D Krawczyk (Mexico) G Olmos	6	6
(Czech Republic) M Bouzková (United States) B Mattek-Sands	6	6
(Romania) I-C Begu (Czech Republic) M Vondroušová	0	3
(China) H Guo; A Panova	6	6
4	(United States) A Muhammad (Netherlands) D Schuurs	3	2
(Hungary) T Babos (United States) N Melichar-Martinez	6	6
(Czech Republic) L Nosková (China) Y Xu	4	2
(Spain) C Bucșa; Y Sizikova	4	6^{2}
2	(Australia) E Perez (Czech Republic) K Siniaková	6	7^{7}

Quarterfinals
(United States) A Krueger (United States) J Pegula
(Kazakhstan) A Danilina; I Khromacheva	w/o
(Brazil) B Haddad Maia (Germany) L Siegemund	5	6	[13]
(United States) D Krawczyk (Mexico) G Olmos	7	4	[11]
(Czech Republic) M Bouzková (United States) B Mattek-Sands	5	5
(China) H Guo; A Panova	7	7
(Hungary) T Babos (United States) N Melichar-Martinez	4	4
2	(Australia) E Perez (Czech Republic) K Siniaková	6	6

Semifinals
(Kazakhstan) A Danilina; I Khromacheva	2	7	[7]
(Brazil) B Haddad Maia (Germany) L Siegemund	6	5	[10]
(China) H Guo; A Panova	4	6	[11]
2	(Australia) E Perez (Czech Republic) K Siniaková	6	3	[9]

Final
(Brazil) B Haddad Maia (Germany) L Siegemund	5	4
(China) H Guo; A Panova	7	6
