= 2025 Adelaide International – Women's singles =

Women's singles
- 2025 Adelaide International

Final
- Champion: (United States) Madison Keys
- Runner-up: (United States) Jessica Pegula
- Score: 6–3, 4–6, 6–1

Details
- Draw: 30 (6 Q / 3 WC )
- Seeds: 8

Events
| Singles | men | women |
| Doubles | men | women |
- Adelaide International

Madison Keys defeated Jessica Pegula in the final, 6–3, 4–6, 6–1 to win the women's singles tennis title at the 2025 Adelaide International. It was her ninth career WTA Tour singles title.

Jeļena Ostapenko was the defending champion but lost in the second round to Keys.

== Seeds ==
The top two seeds received a bye into the second round.

1. (United States) Jessica Pegula (final)
2. (United States) Emma Navarro (quarterfinals)
3. Daria Kasatkina (quarterfinals)
4. (United States) Danielle Collins (first round)
5. (Spain) Paula Badosa (second round)
6. Diana Shnaider (quarterfinals)
7. Anna Kalinskaya (first round, retired)
8. (Latvia) Jeļena Ostapenko (second round)

== Draw ==
Key

- Q = Qualifier
- WC = Wild card
- LL = Lucky loser
- Alt = Alternate
- ITF = ITF entry
- PR = Protected ranking
- SR = Special ranking
- SE = Special exempt
- JE = Junior exempt
- JR = Junior Accelerator Programme entrant
- CO = College Accelerator Programme entrant
- NG = Next Gen Accelerator Program entrant
- w/o = Walkover
- r = Retired
- d = Defaulted

=== Finals ===
Semifinals
1 | (United States) Jessica Pegula | 7^{7} | 6
(Kazakhstan) Yulia Putintseva | 6^{4} | 3
(United States) Madison Keys | 5 | 7 | 3
Liudmila Samsonova | 7 | 5 | 0^{r}

Final
1 | (United States) Jessica Pegula | 3 | 6 | 1
(United States) Madison Keys | 6 | 4 | 6

=== Top half ===
First round
(Czech Republic) L Nosková | 3 | 3
LL | (Greece) M Sakkari | 6 | 6
(Ukraine) M Kostyuk | 6 | 2 | 2
LL | (United States) A Krueger | 4 | 6 | 6
Q | (United States) P Stearns | 7^{7} | 3 | 5
5 | (Spain) P Badosa | 6^{5} | 6 | 7
4 | (United States) D Collins | 6^{6} | 2
WC | (Tunisia) O Jabeur | 7^{8} | 6
(Croatia) D Vekić | 2 | 3
(Kazakhstan) Y Putintseva | 6 | 6
A Pavlyuchenkova | 4 | 7^{7} | 2
PR | (Czech Republic) M Vondroušová | 6 | 6^{4} | 6
Q | (Czech Republic) K Siniaková | 3 | 6 | 0
6 | D Shnaider | 6 | 0 | 6

Second round
1 | (United States) J Pegula | 6 | 6
LL | (Greece) M Sakkari | 4 | 1
LL | (United States) A Krueger | 7^{7} | 6^{4} | 6
5 | (Spain) P Badosa | 6^{5} | 7^{7} | 2
WC | (Tunisia) O Jabeur | 2 | 4
(Kazakhstan) Y Putintseva | 6 | 6
PR | (Czech Republic) M Vondroušová | 6 | 1^{r}
6 | D Shnaider | 4 | 1

Quarterfinals
1 | (United States) J Pegula | 6 | 2
LL | (United States) A Krueger | 4 | 0^{r}
(Kazakhstan) Y Putintseva | 7^{7} | 6^{9} | 6
6 | D Shnaider | 6^{9} | 7^{11} | 4

Semifinals
1 | (United States) J Pegula | 7^{7} | 6
(Kazakhstan) Y Putintseva | 6^{4} | 3

=== Bottom half ===
First round
8 | (Latvia) J Ostapenko | 4 | 6 | 6
(Poland) M Fręch | 6 | 1 | 1
(Brazil) B Haddad Maia | 2 | 1
(United States) M Keys | 6 | 6
Q | (China) Xin Wang | 4 | 0
WC | (Australia) E Jones | 6 | 6
WC | (Australia) O Gadecki | 2 | 3
3 | D Kasatkina | 6 | 6
7 | A Kalinskaya | 2 | 0^{r}
Q | (Switzerland) B Bencic | 6 | 1
Q | (Czech Republic) M Bouzková | 6 | 4 | 1
L Samsonova | 1 | 6 | 6
Q | (Canada) L Fernandez | 4 | 6 | 2
E Alexandrova | 6 | 3 | 6

Second round
8 | (Latvia) J Ostapenko | 6 | 4 | 3
(United States) M Keys | 3 | 6 | 6
WC | (Australia) E Jones | 5 | 3
3 | D Kasatkina | 7 | 6
Q | (Switzerland) B Bencic | 6^{3} | 6 | 4
L Samsonova | 7^{7} | 4 | 6
E Alexandrova | 6^{4} | 4
2 | (United States) E Navarro | 7^{7} | 6

Quarterfinals
(United States) M Keys | 6 | 6
3 | D Kasatkina | 1 | 3
L Samsonova | 6 | 6
2 | (United States) E Navarro | 4 | 4

Semifinals
(United States) M Keys | 5 | 7 | 3
L Samsonova | 7 | 5 | 0^{r}

== Qualifying ==
=== Seeds ===
1. Anastasia Pavlyuchenkova (moved to main draw)
2. (Canada) Leylah Fernandez (qualified)
3. (Greece) Maria Sakkari (qualifying competition, lucky loser)
4. (China) Wang Xinyu (qualified)
5. (Czech Republic) Marie Bouzková (qualified)
6. (Czech Republic) Kateřina Siniaková (qualified)
7. (United States) Peyton Stearns (qualified)
8. Kamilla Rakhimova (qualifying competition)
9. (Japan) Moyuka Uchijima (first round)
10. (United States) Ashlyn Krueger (qualifying competition, lucky loser)
11. (Romania) Sorana Cîrstea (first round)
12. (Romania) Irina-Camelia Begu (qualifying competition)

=== Qualifiers ===
1. (Switzerland) Belinda Bencic
2. (Canada) Leylah Fernandez
3. (United States) Peyton Stearns
4. (China) Wang Xinyu
5. (Czech Republic) Marie Bouzková
6. (Czech Republic) Kateřina Siniaková

=== Lucky losers ===
1. (Greece) Maria Sakkari
2. (United States) Ashlyn Krueger

=== Qualifying draw ===
==== First qualifier ====
First round
Alt | (China) Guo Hanyu | 3 | 3
(Germany) Laura Siegemund | 6 | 6
WC | (Switzerland) Belinda Bencic | 6 | 6
9 | (Japan) Moyuka Uchijima | 2 | 3

Qualifying competition
(Germany) Laura Siegemund | 2 | 3
WC | (Switzerland) Belinda Bencic | 6 | 6

==== Second qualifier ====
First round
2 | (Canada) Leylah Fernandez | 6 | 7^{7}
PR | (United Kingdom) Jodie Burrage | 3 | 6^{2}
WC | (Australia) Kaylah McPhee | 2 | 2
12 | (Romania) Irina-Camelia Begu | 6 | 6

Qualifying competition
2 | (Canada) Leylah Fernandez | 6 | 6
12 | (Romania) Irina-Camelia Begu | 3 | 1

==== Third qualifier ====
First round
3/WC | (Greece) Maria Sakkari | 6 | 4
PR | (China) Zheng Saisai | 2 | 0^{r}
(Norway) Malene Helgø | 2 | 1
7 | (United States) Peyton Stearns | 6 | 6

Qualifying competition
3/WC | (Greece) Maria Sakkari | 4 | 7^{12} | 3
7 | (United States) Peyton Stearns | 6 | 6^{10} | 6

==== Fourth qualifier ====
First round
4 | (China) Wang Xinyu | 7 | 6
(Germany) Tatjana Maria | 5 | 4
(Romania) Jaqueline Cristian | 6 | 5 | 2
8 | Kamilla Rakhimova | 1 | 7 | 6

Qualifying competition
4 | (China) Wang Xinyu | 6 | 6
8 | Kamilla Rakhimova | 3 | 1

==== Fifth qualifier ====
First round
5 | (Czech Republic) Marie Bouzková | 2 | 7 | 6
(Australia) Gabriella Da Silva-Fick | 6 | 5 | 2
(Germany) Jule Niemeier | 6 | 6
11 | (Romania) Sorana Cîrstea | 4 | 2

Qualifying competition
5 | (Czech Republic) Marie Bouzková | 3 | 6 | 6
(Germany) Jule Niemeier | 6 | 1 | 2

==== Sixth qualifier ====
First round
6 | (Czech Republic) Kateřina Siniaková | 7 | 6
(Spain) Cristina Bucșa | 5 | 0
WC | (Australia) Ajla Tomljanović | 5 | 4
10 | (United States) Ashlyn Krueger | 7 | 6

Qualifying competition
6 | (Czech Republic) Kateřina Siniaková | 6 | 2 | 6
10 | (United States) Ashlyn Krueger | 3 | 6 | 2
