= 2025 Adelaide International =

Tennis tournament

- Date: 6–11 January 2025
- Category: ATP 250; WTA 500
- Draw: 28S / 24D (ATP); 30S / 16D (WTA)
- Surface: Hard / outdoor
- Location: Memorial Drive Tennis Centre
- Venue: Adelaide, Australia

Champions

Men's singles
- (Canada) Félix Auger-Aliassime

Women's singles
- (United States) Madison Keys

Men's doubles
- (Italy) Simone Bolelli / (Italy) Andrea Vavassori

Women's doubles
- (China) Guo Hanyu / Alexandra Panova
← 2024 ·	Adelaide International	· 2026 →

The 2025 Adelaide International was a professional tennis tournament on the 2025 ATP Tour and 2025 WTA Tour. It was a combined ATP Tour 250 and WTA 500 tournament played on outdoor hard court at Memorial Drive Tennis Centre, Adelaide, Australia. The tournament was held from 6 to 11 January 2025.

== Champions ==
=== Men's singles ===
- (Canada) Félix Auger-Aliassime def. (United States) Sebastian Korda 6–3, 3–6, 6–1

=== Women's singles ===
- (United States) Madison Keys def. (United States) Jessica Pegula 6–3, 4–6, 6–1

=== Men's doubles ===
- (Italy) Simone Bolelli / (Italy) Andrea Vavassori def. (Germany) Kevin Krawietz / (Germany) Tim Pütz, 4–6, 7–6^{(7–4)}, [11–9]

=== Women's doubles ===
- (China) Guo Hanyu / Alexandra Panova def. (Brazil) Beatriz Haddad Maia / (Germany) Laura Siegemund, 7–5, 6–4

== Point distribution ==
Event	W	F	SF	QF	Round of 16	Round of 32	Q	Q2	Q1
Men's singles	250	165	100	50	25	0	13	7	0
Men's doubles	250	150	90	45	20	0	—	—	—
Women's singles	500	325	195	108	60	1	25	13	1
Women's doubles	500	325	195	108	1	—	—	—	—

=== Prize money ===
Event	W	F	SF	QF	Round of 16	Round of 32	Q2	Q1
Men's singles	$103,525	$60,250	$35,480	$20,555	$11,935	$7,295	$3,650	$1,990
Men's doubles *	$35,580	$18,510	$9,770	$5,450	$2,980	$1,660	—	—
Women's singles	$164,000	$101,000	$59,100	$27,940	$15,170	$10,190	$7,625	$3,900
Women's doubles*	$54,300	$33,000	$19,160	$9,840	$6,000	—	—	—

_{*per team}

== ATP singles main-draw entrants ==
=== Seeds ===
Country	Player	Rank^{1}	Seed
USA	Tommy Paul	12	1
USA	Sebastian Korda	22	2
~~CZE~~	~~Tomáš Macháč~~	~~25~~	~~3~~
~~CZE~~	~~Jiří Lehečka~~	~~28~~	~~4~~
CAN	Félix Auger-Aliassime	29	5
KAZ	Alexander Bublik	33	6
USA	Brandon Nakashima	38	7
ARG	Tomás Martín Etcheverry	39	8
CHN	Zhang Zhizhen	45	9

^{1} Rankings are as of 30 December 2024

=== Other entrants ===
The following players received wildcards into the singles main draw:

- (Australia) Thanasi Kokkinakis
- (Australia) Tristan Schoolkate
- (Australia) Li Tu

The following players received entry from the qualifying draw:

- (France) Benjamin Bonzi
- (Australia) James Duckworth
- (Germany) Yannick Hanfmann
- (Australia) Adam Walton

The following players received entry as lucky losers:

- (France) Manuel Guinard
- (Australia) Rinky Hijikata

=== Withdrawals ===
- (Italy) Matteo Arnaldi → replaced by (Spain) Alejandro Davidovich Fokina
- (Netherlands) Tallon Griekspoor → replaced by (France) Arthur Rinderknech
- (Czech Republic) Jiří Lehečka → replaced by (France) Manuel Guinard
- (Czech Republic) Tomáš Macháč → replaced by (Japan) Yoshihito Nishioka
- (Spain) Jaume Munar → replaced by (Australia) Rinky Hijikata
- (Italy) Lorenzo Musetti → replaced by (Australia) Aleksandar Vukic
- (Australia) Jordan Thompson → replaced by (Australia) Christopher O'Connell

== ATP doubles main-draw entrants ==
=== Seeds ===
Country	Player	Country	Player	Rank^{1}	Seed
ESA	Marcelo Arévalo	CRO	Mate Pavić	2	1
GER	Kevin Krawietz	GER	Tim Pütz	16	2
ITA	Simone Bolelli	ITA	Andrea Vavassori	21	3
FIN	Harri Heliövaara	GBR	Henry Patten	30	4
USA	Nathaniel Lammons	USA	Jackson Withrow	38	5
AUS	Matthew Ebden	BEL	Joran Vliegen	44	6
GBR	Joe Salisbury	GBR	Neal Skupski	51	7
BEL	Sander Gillé	POL	Jan Zieliński	56	8

^{1} Rankings are as of 30 December 2024

=== Other entrants ===
The following pairs received wildcards into the doubles main draw:

- (Australia) Thomas Fancutt / (Australia) Matthew Romios
- (Australia) Luke Saville / (Australia) Li Tu

The following pair received entry as alternates:

- (Czech Republic) Petr Nouza / (Czech Republic) Patrik Rikl

=== Withdrawals ===
- (Romania) Victor Vlad Cornea / (China) Zhang Zhizhen → replaced by (Czech Republic) Petr Nouza / (Czech Republic) Patrik Rikl

== WTA singles main-draw entrants ==
=== Seeds ===
Country	Player	Rank^{1}	Seed
USA	Jessica Pegula	7	1
USA	Emma Navarro	8	2
	Daria Kasatkina	9	3
USA	Danielle Collins	11	4
ESP	Paula Badosa	12	5
	Diana Shnaider	13	6
	Anna Kalinskaya	14	7
LAT	Jeļena Ostapenko	15	8

^{1} Rankings are as of 30 December 2024

=== Other entrants ===
The following players received wildcards into the singles main draw:

- (Australia) Olivia Gadecki
- (Tunisia) Ons Jabeur
- (Australia) Emerson Jones

The following player received entry using a protected ranking into the main draw:

- (Czech Republic) Markéta Vondroušová

The following players received entry from the qualifying draw:

- (Switzerland) Belinda Bencic
- (Czech Republic) Marie Bouzková
- (Canada) Leylah Fernandez
- (Czech Republic) Kateřina Siniaková
- (United States) Peyton Stearns
- (China) Wang Xinyu

The following players received entry as lucky losers:

- (United States) Ashlyn Krueger
- (Greece) Maria Sakkari

=== Withdrawals ===
- Mirra Andreeva → replaced by (United States) Ashlyn Krueger
- (United Kingdom) Katie Boulter → replaced by Ekaterina Alexandrova
- (Czech Republic) Barbora Krejčíková → replaced by Anastasia Pavlyuchenkova
- (Italy) Jasmine Paolini → replaced by Liudmila Samsonova

== WTA doubles main-draw entrants ==
=== Seeds ===
Country	Player	Country	Player	Rank^{1}	Seed
TPE	Hsieh Su-wei	LAT	Jeļena Ostapenko	13	1
AUS	Ellen Perez	CZE	Kateřina Siniaková	14	2
TPE	Chan Hao-ching	UKR	Lyudmyla Kichenok	20	3
USA	Asia Muhammad	NED	Demi Schuurs	39	4

^{1} Rankings are as of 30 December 2024

=== Other entrants ===
The following pair received a wildcard into the doubles main draw:

- (Australia) Gabriella Da Silva-Fick / (Australia) Olivia Gadecki
