= Beatriz Haddad Maia =

Brazilian tennis player (born 1996)

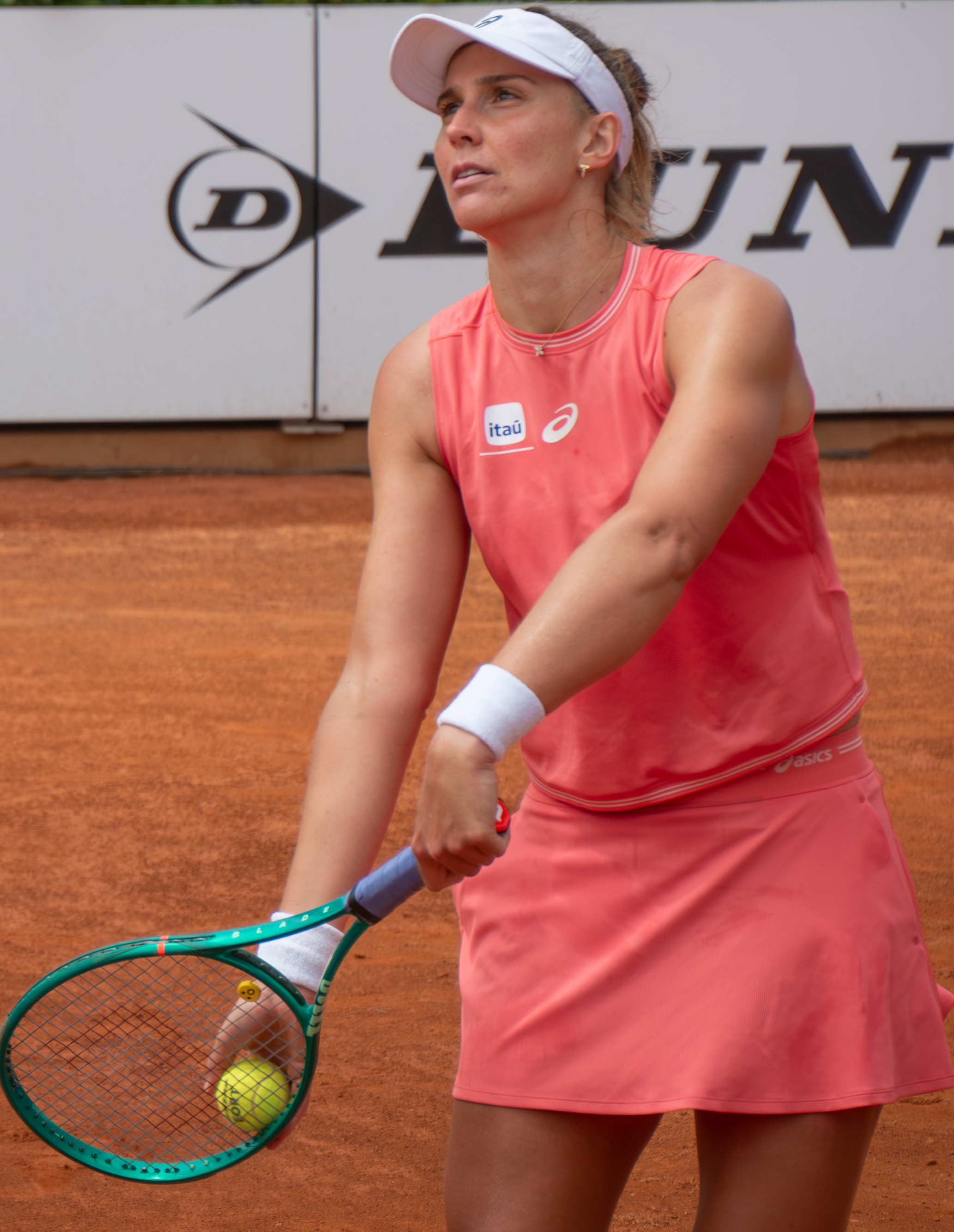
- Haddad Maia at the 2026 Italian Open
- Country (sports): Brazil
- Residence: São Paulo, Brazil
- Born: 30 May 1996 (age 30) São Paulo, Brazil
- Height: 1.85 m (6 ft 1 in)
- Turned pro: 2014
- Plays: Left-handed (two-handed backhand)
- Coach: Carlos Martínez Comet (2026–)
- Prize money: $9,557,686

Singles
- Career record: 483–289
- Career titles: 4
- Highest ranking: No. 10 (12 June 2023)
- Current ranking: No. 419 (16 November 2026)

Grand Slam singles results
- Australian Open: 3R (2024, 2025)
- French Open: SF (2023)
- Wimbledon: 4R (2023)
- US Open: QF (2024)

Other tournaments
- Olympic Games: 2R (2024)

Doubles
- Career record: 198–112
- Career titles: 8
- Highest ranking: No. 10 (8 May 2023)
- Current ranking: No. 308 (19 October 2026)

Grand Slam doubles results
- Australian Open: F (2022)
- French Open: 3R (2025, 2026)
- Wimbledon: 3R (2017, 2022, 2025)
- US Open: QF (2023)

Other doubles tournaments
- Tour Finals: RR (2022)
- Olympic Games: 2R (2024)

Grand Slam mixed doubles results
- French Open: QF (2022)
- Wimbledon: 2R (2022)

Team competitions
- Fed Cup: 33–14
- Last updated on: 21 October 2026.

Beatriz "Bia" Haddad Maia (Brazilian Portuguese: [beaˈtɾiz ʁaˈdadʒi ˈmajɐ]; born 30 May 1996) is a Brazilian inactive tennis player. She reached career-high rankings of No. 10 in singles and in doubles by the WTA, becoming the first Brazilian woman to enter the top 10 in singles in the Open Era. Her most notable results in singles are a major semifinal at the 2023 French Open and a major quarterfinal at the 2024 US Open. She was also a runner-up with Anna Danilina at the 2022 Australian Open.

Haddad Maia has won twelve WTA Tour titles, four in singles and eight in doubles. Playing for the Brazil Fed Cup team, she has a win–loss record of 33–14 (12–2 in doubles) as of August 2026.

In August 2026, Haddad Maia announced that she is taking an indefinite break from the tour due to mental struggles and a difficult run with form.

== Early life and background ==
Born in São Paulo to Ayrton Elias Maia Filho and Lais Scaff Haddad, Beatriz started playing tennis at the age of five. She comes from a tennis family of Lebanese descent. Both her mother Lais Scaff Haddad, and her grandmother Arlette Scaff Haddad, were successful tennis players in Brazil. Her cousins Gabriela and Antonin are also former tennis players.

She is also the niece of the famous Brazilian singer, television host and composer Rolando Boldrin (1936–2022).

Her father Ayrton competed as a basketball player. Her paternal grandfather, Ayrton, also competed as a basketball player.

Haddad Maia's paternal grandmother, Teresa Maia, was a socio-environmental activist and was honored with a park named after her, the Teresa Maia Park, on the region of Granja Viana, São Paulo, where she used to live.

Haddad Maia gained a degree on Business Administration by distance learning at the Estácio de Sá University.

== Career ==
=== 2010–13: Beginnings, two junior major doubles finals ===
In the beginning of her career, Haddad Maia received part of her training as an athlete first at the Esporte Clube Sírio and then at the Esporte Clube Pinheiros, both in São Paulo. Then, in 2010, she moved to Camboriú, in Santa Catarina, to work at the academy of Larri Passos, mentor and former coach of Gustavo Kuerten, going to live alone at only 14 years old.

Haddad Maia won her first doubles title at the ITF Circuit tournament in Mogi das Cruzes in September 2010, aged 14, playing alongside Flávia Guimarães Bueno, and her first singles title at the 10k event in Goiânia in 2011, aged 15. Haddad Maia peaked at No. 15 in the ITF junior rankings.

Her best achievement as a junior player was being runner-up at the French Open twice in 2012 and 2013, partnering with Paraguayan Montserrat González and Ecuadorian Doménica González, respectively. She was also a doubles semifinalist at the Wimbledon Championships in 2011 playing alongside Mayya Katsitadze from Russia.

She made her tour-level debut at the 2013 Brasil Tennis Cup in Florianópolis as a wildcard entrant. She scored her first WTA Tour main-draw win against Hsu Chieh-yu, before losing to Melinda Czink in the second round. At the same tournament, Haddad made her tour-level doubles main-draw debut, with partner Carla Forte.

=== 2014–16: Turning professional ===
Haddad Maia turned professional in 2014. She was handed a wildcard at both the Rio Open and Brasil Tennis Cup main draws, losing in the first round of singles and doubles of both tournaments. In December of that year, she became Brazil's second highest ranked female tennis player.

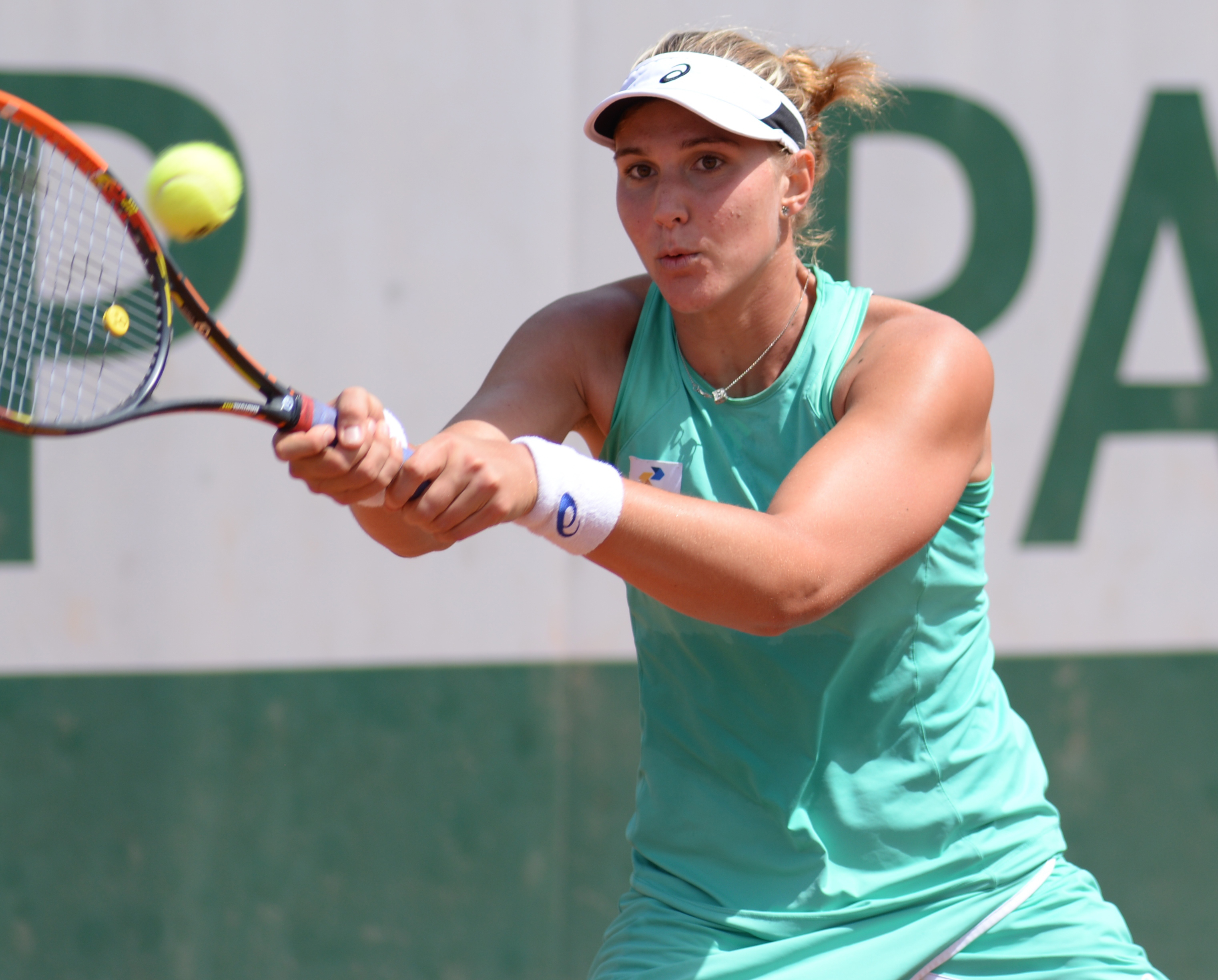
Haddad at the 2015 French Open

In February 2015, she reached the quarterfinals of the Rio Open as a wildcard entrant. Playing alongside Teliana Pereira, she reached the semifinals in the doubles competition but was forced to withdraw due to the injury sustained in the singles competition. In Bogotá, Haddad won her first career doubles title with fellow Brazilian Paula Cristina Gonçalves, defeating Irina Falconi and Shelby Rogers in the final. In July 2015, she suffered a shoulder injury at the Pan American Games in Toronto, resulting in season-ending surgery.

In 2016, Haddad Maia was awarded wildcards for the Rio Open, Miami Open, and Brasil Tennis Cup.

Having fallen to the 367th position in the rankings by 18 July 2016, Haddad recovered almost 200 spots during the second half of the year, finishing with two consecutive 50k titles in Scottsdale and Waco.

=== 2017: Top 100, first WTA Tour singles final ===
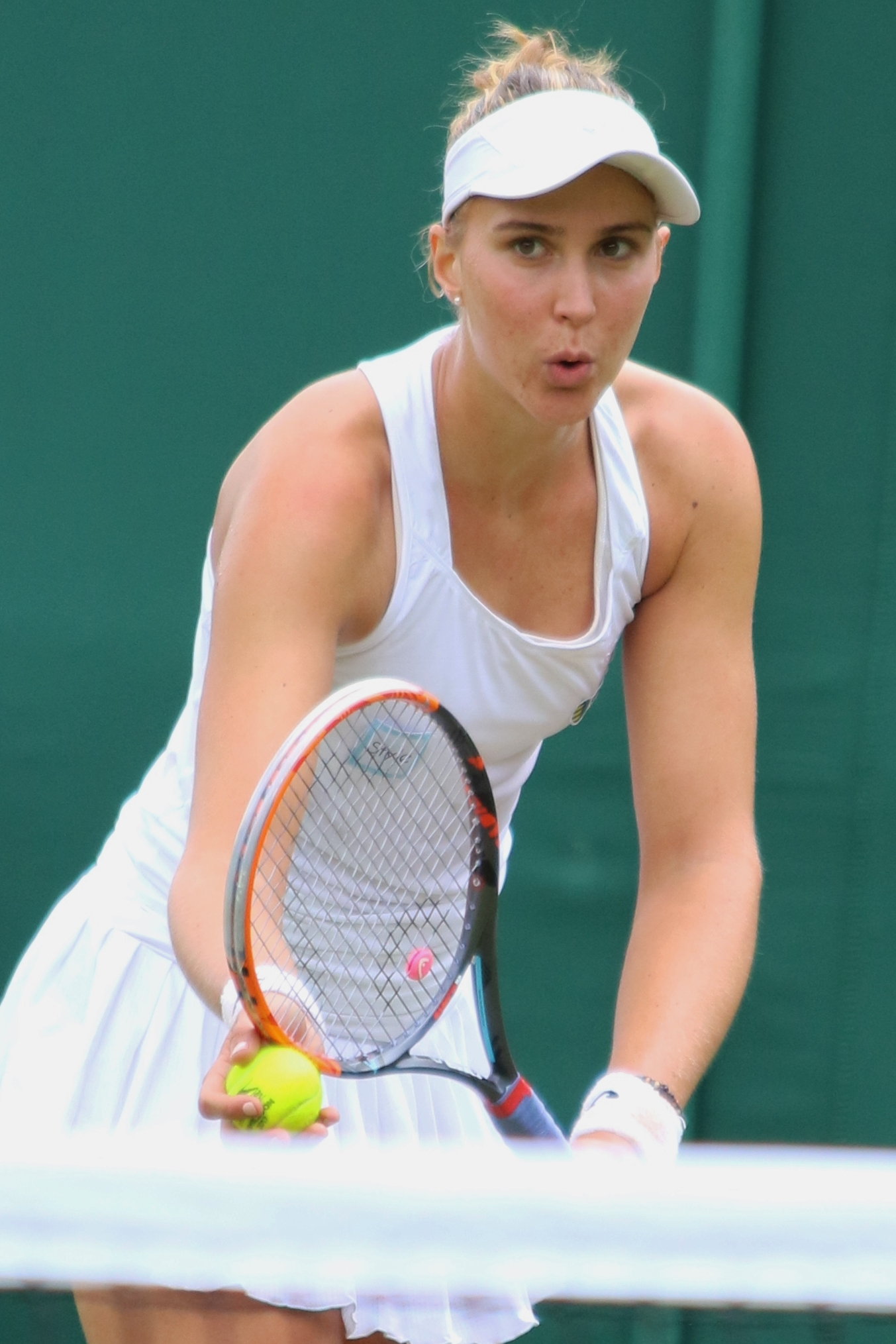
Haddad at the 2017 Wimbledon Championships

Haddad Maia started her 2017 season in Australia, playing two tournaments in Perth and winning the 25k event in Clare, South Australia in both singles and doubles with partner Genevieve Lorbergs. At Bogotá, she won her second title at the event. Playing with Argentinian Nadia Podoroska, she defeated Verónica Cepede Royg and Magda Linette in the final. During the European clay-court season, she entered the qualifying tournament at Stuttgart and lost to Kristýna Plíšková in the quarterfinals. The following week, Haddad recorded the best performance so far at the 100k Open de Cagnes-sur-Mer, when she won the title without dropping a set, defeating Jil Teichmann in the final. As a result, she made her debut in the top 100 of the WTA rankings. In the French Open qualifying, Haddad Maia won all three of her matches, earning a spot in the main draw of a Grand Slam tournament for the first time in her career. Also on clay, she reached the semifinals of the Bol Open, a WTA 125 event, losing to the eventual champion, Aleksandra Krunić.

Haddad Maia received her first direct acceptance at a major main draw at Wimbledon, losing in the second round to Simona Halep. In the doubles competition, she advanced to the third round with Croatian partner Ana Konjuh, before losing to Chan Hao-ching and Monica Niculescu.

Her first direct entry at a WTA Tour tournament Haddad gained at the Korean Open where she reached her first singles final, losing to Jeļena Ostapenko.

=== 2018: Injury and hiatus ===
After the Australian Open, she played for Brazil at the American Fed Cup Zone six rubbers between both singles and doubles and won five of them.

=== 2019–20: Doping suspension and return ===
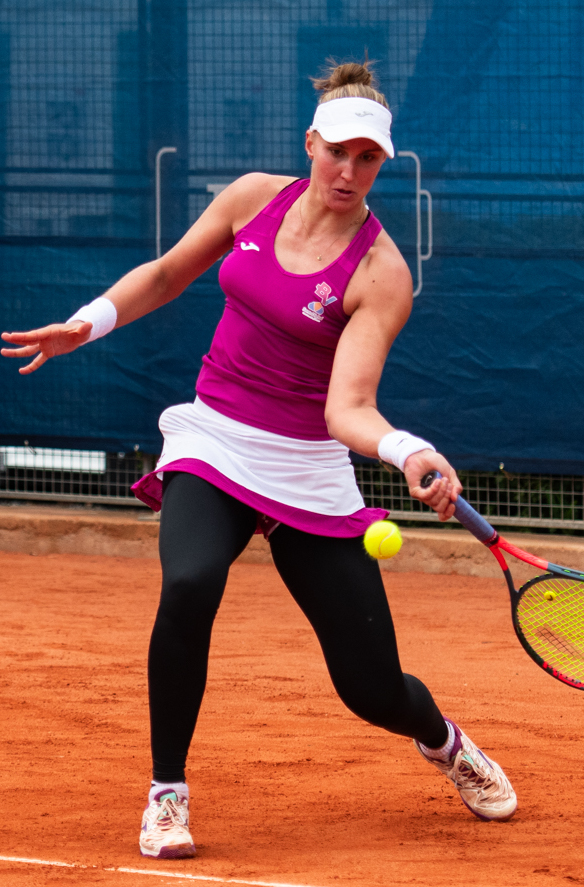
Haddad Maia at the 2019 Prague Open

Haddad Maia qualified for the Australian Open, reaching the second round of the main draw. She also reached the quarterfinals, as a qualifier, at the WTA Tour event in Acapulco in late February, losing to eventual champion Wang Yafan.

Again out of the qualifying, Haddad Maia reached the semifinals at the Copa Colsanitas, losing to eventual champion Amanda Anisimova. After retiring due to injury in the first round of qualifying at the French Open, she played a WTA Challenger event in Bol, Croatia during the second week of the French Open in early June.

In July 2019, she was provisionally suspended by the ITF for testing positive for ostarine (SARM S-22) and ligandrol (LGD-4033) at the event in Bol. In February 2020, Haddad Maia was served with a ten-month ban for the period July 2019 to May 2020 for unintentional use of the banned substances, as she was unable to prove that the sources were contaminated supplements that she had been prescribed by her sports medicine specialists. The judgement declared that she bore "No Significant Fault or Negligence" for the violation, but given prior similar cases involving Brazilian players such as Marcelo Demoliner, Thomaz Bellucci and Igor Marcondes, the ITF determined that she should have been aware of the risks of using supplements and therefore issued her with the ban.

Having dropped to a ranking of 1,342 during the suspension, she could not compete in that major event, having to start again in small tournaments. After widespread cancellation of tournaments due to the COVID-19 pandemic, she returned to play in September 2020 at the ITF event of Montemor-o-Novo in Portugal. Haddad won the title and three more on Portuguese soil in the next month. A hand injury led to an enchondroma diagnosis and forced her to go through a season-ending surgery.

=== 2021: Indian Wells fourth round, back to top 100 ===
In October, at the rescheduled Indian Wells Open, Haddad lost in qualifying but was awarded a spot in the main draw following the withdrawal of 29th seed Nadia Podoroska. She upset Karolína Plíšková to advance to the fourth round. The performance was enough to return to the top 100.

=== 2022: Major doubles & WTA 1000 singles finals ===
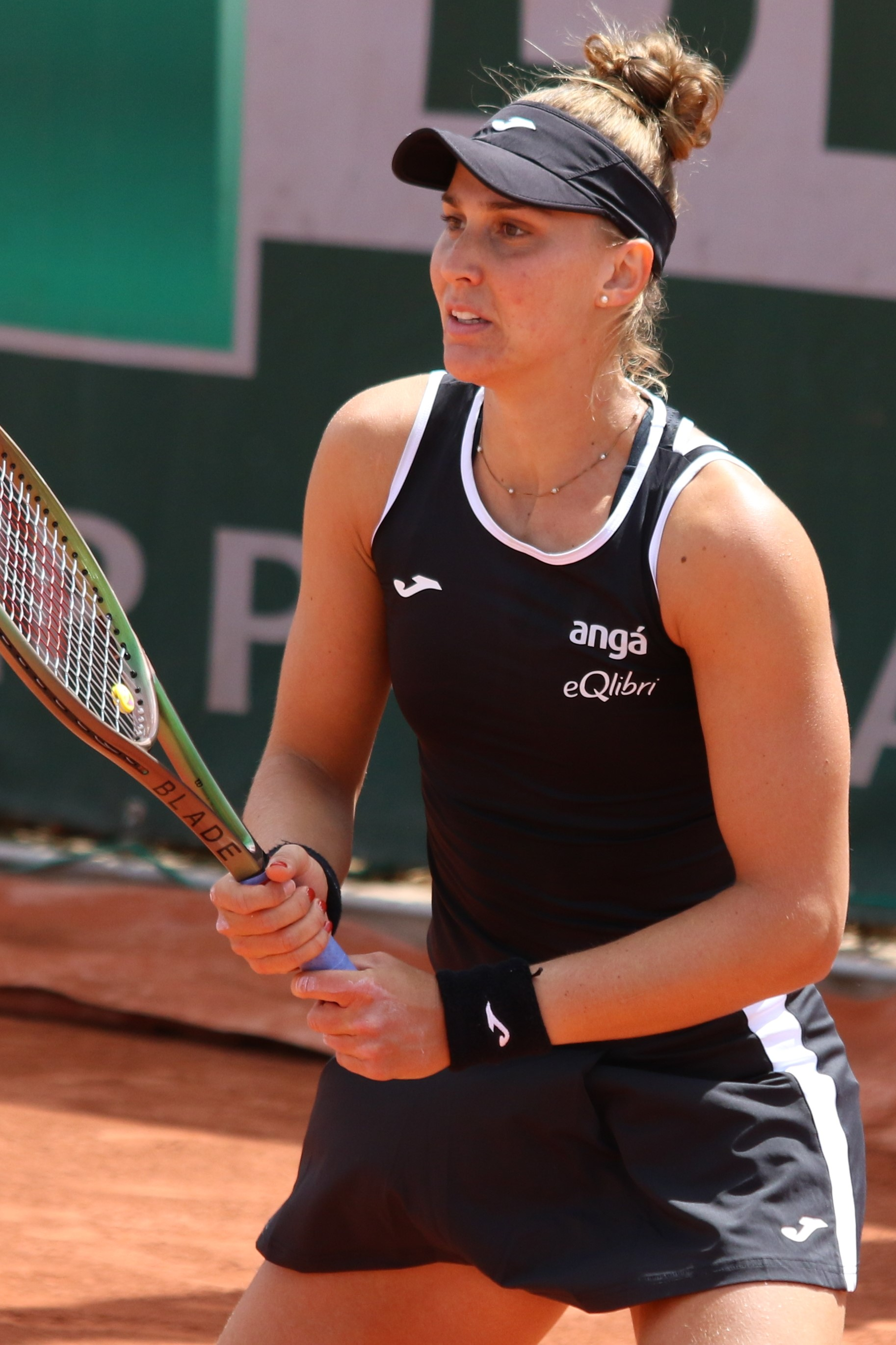
Haddad Maia at the 2022 French Open

She played doubles at Melbourne with Anna Danilina, and they reached the final, making Haddad only the third Brazilian woman in a final of a Grand Slam tournament, after Maria Bueno and Cláudia Monteiro. Haddad Maia rose to No. 40 in the WTA doubles rankings.

Her best performance after the Australian Open was in the Monterrey Open, reaching the semifinals, where she lost to eventual champion Leylah Fernandez. Haddad also managed another upset over a top-5 player at the Miami Open, beating world No. 3, Maria Sakkari, to reach the third round on a WTA 1000 level for the third time in her career.

In May, she won her first WTA 125 tournament, the Open de Saint-Malo, defeating Anna Blinkova in the final, and she won the doubles at the Trophee Lagardère in Paris with Mladenovic while also being runner-up in the singles to Claire Liu. As a result, Haddad Maia surpassed her previous career-high of 57 in the singles rankings with No. 49, becoming the first woman Brazilian in the WTA top 50 since Teliana Pereira in 2015.

Haddad won her biggest singles title at the WTA 250 Nottingham Open, while also winning the doubles tournament alongside Zhang Shuai. The results boosted her to the top 40 in the singles and top 30 in doubles rankings. She followed this victory up with facing Zhang in the final of the Birmingham Classic where Haddad won her second singles title, when the Chinese retired in the first set. The title propelled her into the top 30 in singles for the first time in her career. She joined Ons Jabeur who won in Berlin less than an hour earlier, and Iga Świątek as players to win multiple tour titles in the season. She was also the first Brazilian to win in the tournament 40-year history. Gisele Miró had the best previous result by a player from Brazil, reaching the second round in 1989. When Haddad lost her Eastbourne International semifinal match to Petra Kvitová, she had 12 wins and a walkover, the longest winning streak on grass courts since Serena Williams a decade earlier. Despite impressive form in the warm-up grass-court tournaments, she lost in the first round of Wimbledon.

Ranked No. 24 in singles at the start of the Canadian Open, she reached the final by defeating Martina Trevisan, Leylah Fernandez, Iga Świątek, and Belinda Bencic. As a result, she reached the top 20 in the singles rankings, on 15 August 2022. Haddad then breezed past former No. 1, Karolína Plíšková, to become the first Brazilian woman ever to reach a WTA 1000 final. She lost the final against Simona Halep, in three sets.

At the WTA 1000 Guadajalara Open, Haddad and Danilina reached the final, and she became the first Brazilian woman in history to qualify for the WTA Finals. Thanks to this result, she also entered the world's top 15 in doubles for the first time. In an unprecedented Brazilian final at the WTA 1000 level against Luisa Stefani and Storm Sanders, they ended runners-up in a tight result, with a deciding [10–8] in favour of Stefani/Sanders. Haddad Maia finished the season being awarded by the WTA as Most Improved Player of 2022.

=== 2023: WTA 1000 doubles title, top 10, major semifinal in singles ===
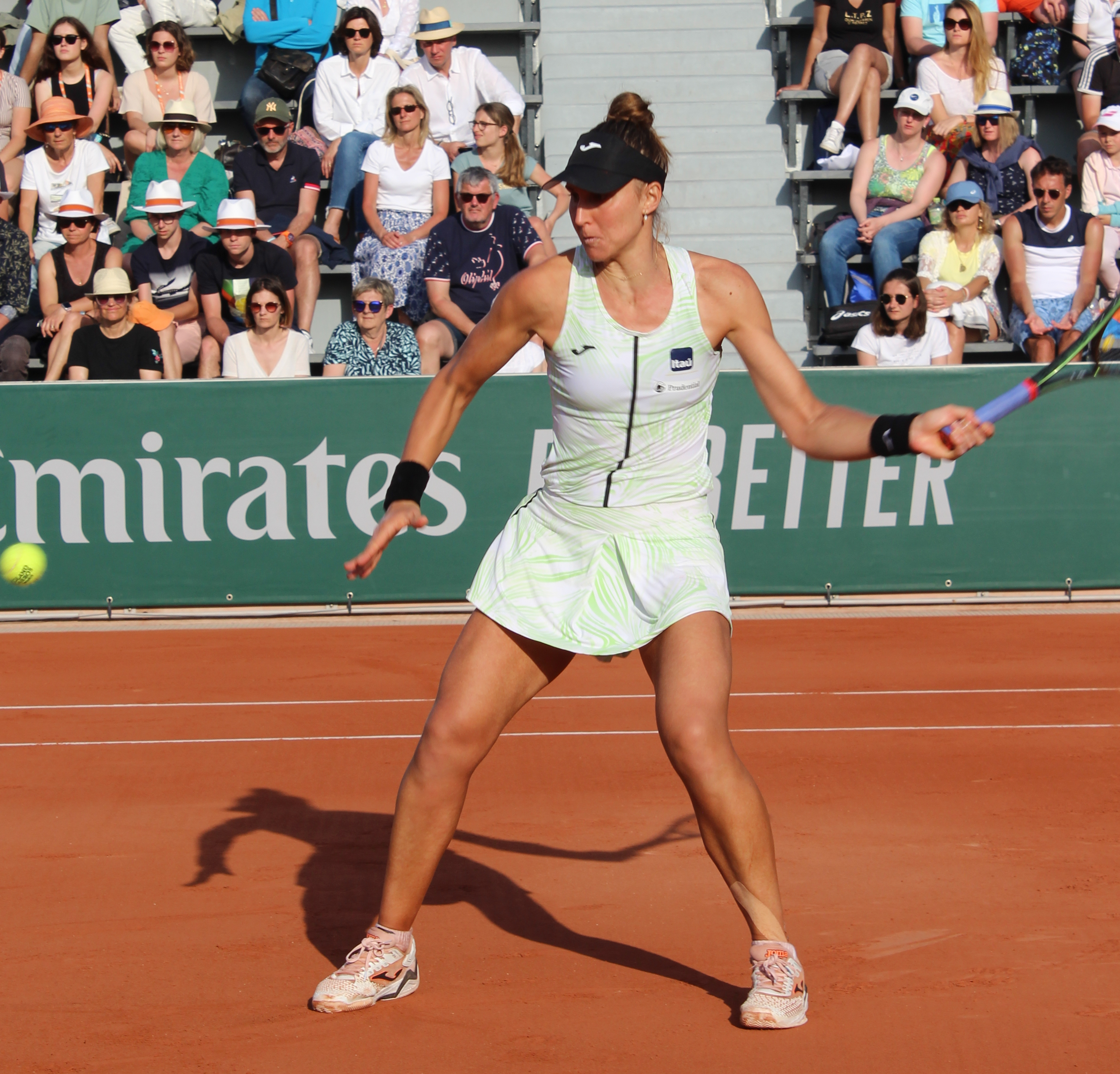
At Roland Garros, 2023

At the WTA 500 in Abu Dhabi, she stood in the quarterfinals after more than a three-hour battle with Yulia Putintseva. Next, she reached the semifinals by defeating Elena Rybakina and recording a six-match winning streak against top-10 players. She lost the semifinal match to Belinda Bencic in straight sets. Nevertheless, she moved to a career-high ranking of No. 12 on 13 February 2023.

Playing with Laura Siegemund, Haddad reached her second WTA 1000 doubles final in Indian Wells.

She won her first WTA 1000 title at the Madrid Open with Victoria Azarenka, defeating Jessica Pegula and Coco Gauff in a final that was followed by controversy as none of the participating players were allowed to make a speech on the podium during the awards ceremony. The organizers subsequently apologized for the mistake. As a result, she reached the top 10 in the doubles rankings on 8 May 2023.

At the Italian Open, Haddad Maia reached quarterfinals at the WTA 1000-level for the second time. She was close to qualifying for the semifinals, but in an extremely long match lasting 3 hours and 41 minutes, the longest of the season, she lost to Anhelina Kalinina. Still in the first set, Haddad felt an injury to her left leg, which ended up limiting her movement in decisive moments of the game.

At the French Open, she became the first Brazilian woman to reach the semifinals since Maria Bueno in 1966. Haddad lost the semifinal to top seed and world No. 1, Iga Świątek. She entered the top 10 in singles on 12 June 2023, becoming the first Brazilian woman to reach this milestone since the introduction of the WTA rankings.

In her first-round match on the grass courts of the Nottingham Open, she slipped and felt a strong pain in the back of her knee that limited her movement, leaving her with edema in the region. She lost the match and had to withdraw from the following week's tournament in Birmingham. At the Eastbourne International, she won the first match but was forced to retire from her match against Petra Martić, still due to her knee injury with the score at 4–6, 2–3.

She made up for these losses by having the best campaign of her career at Wimbledon. Haddad won the first three matches and reached the fourth round, during which she was forced to retire due to a lower back injury.

At the US Open, she advanced into the doubles quarterfinals, before losing in a close match to former champions, Laura Siegemund and Vera Zvonareva.

Haddad won both tournaments at the 2023 WTA Elite Trophy, becoming the first player to win both titles at the Elite Trophy's history and also to do so in the same edition of the tournament. In doubles she partnered with Veronika Kudermetova and together they defeated Miyu Kato and Aldila Sutjiadi in the final with a score of a double 6–3. At the singles draw she defeated Zheng Qinwen in two sets that went to a tiebreak. She finished the season at No. 11, her best end of the season ranking.

=== 2024: First WTA 500 singles title, Olympics debut, US Open quarterfinalist ===
Her first competition of the season was representing Brazil in the United Cup in Perth, Australia, a mixed team competition for countries. Haddad's evolution in the previous season was decisive for Brazil to qualify for this tournament for the second consecutive time. Although the team's performance was not good and Brazil was disqualified in the group stage, the Brazilian No. 1 was the only one to record a win for the team in the women's singles match against Sara Sorribes Tormo in straight sets. Haddad participated in the Adelaide International and formed a partnership with Taylor Townsend in the doubles bracket. They won the tournament title beating Caroline Garcia and Kristina Mladenovic, in straight sets in the final. Haddad had a direct entry into the Australian Open. In the singles main draw, as No. 10 seed, she got past Linda Fruhvirtová in the first round in a three-set match, then defeated Alina Korneeva in the second in straight sets, becoming the first Brazilian to advance to the third round in Australia in the Open era and the first since Maria Bueno in 1965, but then lost to qualifier Maria Timofeeva, in straight sets. In the doubles, keeping partnership with Townsend and as No. 8 seeds, they reached the round of 16, before falling to Cristina Bucșa and Alexandra Panova, also in straight sets. As a result, Haddad returned into the top 20 of the doubles rankings, gaining three places. For the Abu Dhabi Open, in preparation for the 2024 Paris Olympics, Haddad decided to partner with compatriot Luisa Stefani, as both have the rankings to play the doubles tournament together, and previously won two ITF tournaments in 2019. She reached both semifinals of Abu Dhabi, but after losing a long match to Daria Kasatkina, she pulled out of the doubles match the following day. Her next tournament was the Qatar Ladies Open where she lost in the first round to Wang Xinyu, in straight sets.

In August, at the Cleveland Open, she reached her sixth WTA Tour final, defeating qualifier Viktorija Golubic, Cristina Bucșa, Clara Burel, and third seed Kateřina Siniaková before losing to wildcard entrant McCartney Kessler. Haddad Maia won her first WTA 500 singles title at the Korea Open, defeating three Russian players, sisters Polina and Veronika Kudermetova in the same day and then Kasatkina in the final, in three sets.

=== 2025: Second Nottingham doubles title ===
Haddad Maia began her 2025 season representing Brazil in the 2025 United Cup, held in Perth, Australia. In her first match, she faced the Chinese player Gao Xinyu, ranked 175th in the world. Haddad suffered a dramatic defeat in a match lasting 3 hours and 20 minutes. She lost in three sets, after experiencing severe cramping that forced her to serve underarm in the decisive moments. In Brazil's second tie of the event, Haddad faced Laura Siegemund of Germany and lost in straight sets. Brazil was eliminated, after suffering additional defeats in singles and mixed doubles, concluding the United Cup without advancing through the group stage. Next, Haddad participated in the WTA 500 Adelaide International where she was seeded 15th in the singles draw. Suffering a two-set loss against Madison Keys in the first round, marked her worst start to a season in four years. At the same tournament, Haddad and Siegemund finished runners-up losing the final to Guo Hanyu and Alexandra Panova. Haddad Maia, again partnered with Siegemund, reached the semifinals at the Qatar Ladies Open and the quarterfinals at the Dubai Open, the round of 16 at the Indian Wells Open and the quarterfinals at the Madrid Open. Additionally, she partnered with Luisa Stefani to play and win against Linda Nosková and Tereza Valentová in the 2025 Billie Jean King Cup.

At the Australian Open, she played again at both singles and doubles competitions. In singles, she faced Argentine player Julia Riera and won in three sets, her first singles win of the 2025 season. Advancing to the second round, she competed against Erika Andreeva, winning in straight sets. With this victory, Haddad equaled the best performance by a Brazilian in the Open Era. In doubles, she partnered again with Siegemund. In the first round, they beat Suzan Lamens and Quinn Gleason in straight sets. Her run at the Australian Open would end in the third round of both singles and doubles. In singles, she lost to Veronika Kudermetova in straight sets, and in doubles, she and Siegemund were defeated by Erin Routliffe and Gabriela Dabrowski, in three sets. In her next eight singles matches, Haddad would not get a single win, losing to Magdalena Fręch in Doha, Anastasia Potapova in Dubai, Rebecca Šramková at the 2025 Mérida Open, Sonay Kartal at Indian Wells, Linda Fruhvirtová at the Miami Open, Linda Nosková and Jéssica Bouzas Maneiro in the BJK Cup and Emma Navarro at the Stuttgart Open. Haddad would only win again in singles matches against Bernarda Pera in the first round of the Madrid Open. Despite that, Haddad Maia would lose her second match against Belinda Bencic, and at the 2025 Italian Open against Marie Bouzková in her opening match.

In her next tournament, the Internationaux de Strasbourg, she delivered her best singles performance of the 2025 season so far, reaching the semifinals and losing to Elena Rybakina in a hard-fought three-set match. Haddad's next tournament was the French Open, where she lost to Hailey Baptiste in the first round, in a three-set match. However, in the doubles draw, she again played alongside Siegemund and delivered the best performance on that tournament in her career, reaching the round of 16 for the first time, but losing to the eventual champions, Sara Errani and Jasmine Paolini.

Haddad Maia then went to play on grass court. At the Queen's Club Championships, she won her first singles match in a comeback win in three sets, facing former world No. 2 and Wimbledon champion, Petra Kvitová, marking their third encounter. In the second round, she faced Emma Navarro in their third encounter of the season and the first ever on grass. Navarro won in three sets. In the doubles draw alongside Cristina Bucșa, they were defeated in the first round by the Kazakh pair of Yulia Putintseva and Elena Rybakina. Haddad then went to play at the Nottingham Open to fight for her second titles in singles and doubles at that tournament. She had her second encounter against McCartney Kessler in the opening round and lost in a 2 hours and 50 minutes three-set match. In doubles, she continued her partnership with Siegemund and together they won the first title together in their third final and Haddad's first trophy of the season, playing against Anna Danilina and Ena Shibahara in the decisive match, in straight sets. For the second time in her career, Haddad Maia was a two-time champion in doubles. It was her eighth title in doubles on the WTA Tour and the second on grass. It was her fourth title on grass, also considering those played in singles. In Germany at the 2025 Bad Homburg Open, she only played in the singles draw and reached the quarterfinals but lost to Jasmine Paolini in straight sets. In Wimbledon, Haddad lost in the second round to Dalma Gálfi, and while she reached the third round in doubles, Siegemund's progress in the singles draw forced them withdraw from the tournament.

Following an up and down summer on the hardcourt swing, she delivered a spirited run at the US Open where her campaign ended in the fourth round with a straight-sets loss to Amanda Anisimova. She then played at the inaugural SP Open, a WTA 250 at her hometown of São Paulo, in September, entering as the tournament's top seed. She fell in the quarterfinals to Renata Zarazúa. She also participated in the doubles draw, playing alongside Brazilian Ana Candiotto. They lost in the first round to fellow Brazilians and eventual runners-up, Laura Pigossi and Ingrid Martins. After losing in the second round of the Korea Open, Haddad decided to make a pause on her career to take care of her mind and body health and publicly stated on her social media accounts that she would only return to competitions in 2026.

During this period, she underwent an egg freezing procedure, citing her long term goal of becoming a mother. The process was supported by a WTA policy that allows players to retain a protected ranking while undergoing fertility preservation.

In October, Haddad was part of the “September shot of the month” poll on WTA's Instagram account, competing with a shot she performed at the SP Open on her win against Miriana Tona. Haddad Maia ended up being the most voted of the poll and was chosen as the winner. In December, that same shot was one of the chosen to be in the poll on WTA's Instagram account for the “Shot of the year”.

=== 2026: Back to the WTA Tour, coach change ===
In January, after a couple of months away from the WTA Tour to take care of her body's and mind's health, Haddad Maia entered the main draw at the Adelaide International with a protected ranking of No. 30 and lost in the first round to Victoria Mboko. She went on to play at the Australian Open, where she faced Yulia Putintseva in the first round and lost in three sets. At the Abu Dhabi Open, she lost to Dayana Yastremska in two sets in the first round. Ranked in the top 70, Haddad received a wildcard for the qualifying rounds of the Qatar Ladies Open. In the first round, she recorded her first victory of the season, by beating Qatari player Mubaraka Al-Naimi with a double bagel. In the second round, she faced Anastasia Zakharova and lost in straight sets, however, she got to be a lucky loser. and in the main draw she faced Janice Tjen and lost in straight sets. Shortly after, Haddad Maia decided to end the partnership with her coach Rafael Paciaroni after six years of working together. After that, she went to the tournaments accompanied by her mother Lais.

Haddad Maia's next tournament was the 2026 Mérida Open, where she lost in the first round to Katie Boulter, in straight sets. After that, she played at the Indian Wells Open and lost in the first round against Jéssica Bouzas Maneiro, in three sets. The following week, at the WTA 125 in Austin, she faced Linda Fruhvirtová in the opening round and lost in three sets. At the Miami Open, she lost in two sets to Zeynep Sönmez in the first round.

The following weeks, Haddad Maia was scheduled to play at the Charleston Open and in the 2026 Billie Jean King Cup, but decided to withdraw from those competitions. After almost fifty days without a coach, it was announced that Carlos Martinez Comet would be Haddad Maia's next coach. Martinez Comet had previously worked with players such as Svetlana Kuznetsova, Daria Kasatkina and Loïs Boisson. The first tournament working with new coach Carlos Martinez Comet was the Oeiras Ladies Open, a WTA 125 level tournament in Portugal. In her opening match, Haddad Maia realized her first main-draw win of the season, over Portuguese player Francisca Jorge, in straight sets. This was also the first main-draw win for Haddad in seven months, dating back to September 2025.

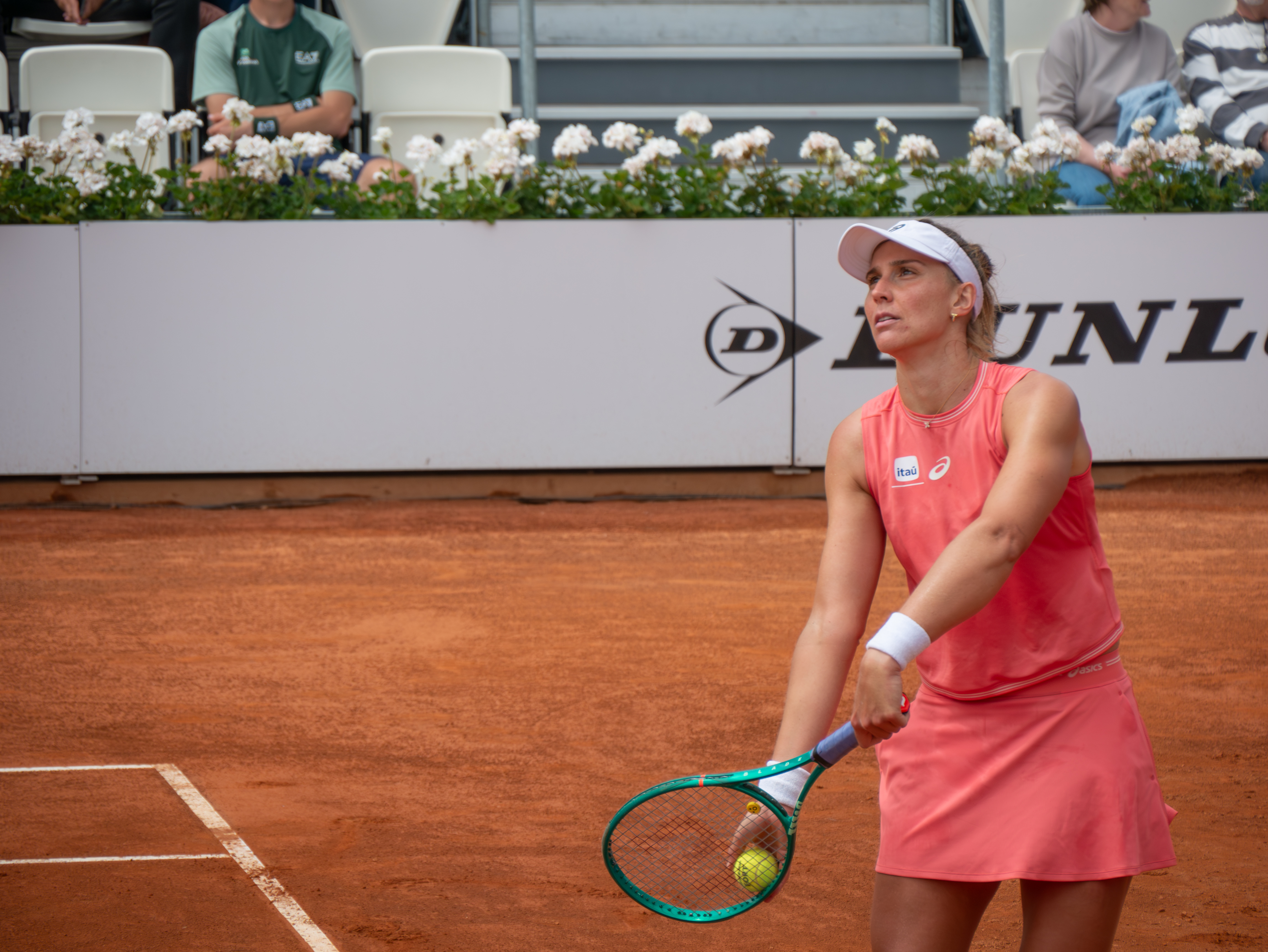
Haddad Maia at the 2026 Italian Open

== Endorsements ==
For clothing and footwear, Haddad Maia was sponsored by Joma from the 2018 to the 2023 season. From the 2024 season onwards, Haddad began to be sponsored by Asics. For rackets, Bia signed a sponsorship with Wilson in 2020.

In addition, Haddad also signed sponsorships with companies from various sectors, such as: SMZTO (franchising) since 2021, and since 2023 the Itaú bank, of which she is an "ambassador" having participated in institutional campaigns and the insurance company Prudential.

At the end of 2023, Haddad signed a sponsorship with the American jewelry trading company Tiffany & Co., and it was expected that she would wear the brand's products during the 2024 Grand Slam tournaments and at the 2024 Summer Olympics in Paris.

In January 2024, Haddad signed a sponsorship deal with the Brazilian food company Bauducco and Chevrolet.

In 2026, Haddad Maia signed a two-year sponsorship deal with the insurance company FF Seguros.

== Coaching team ==
- Eduardo Eche
- Larri Passos (2010–2014)
- Germán Gaich (2016–2020)
- Rafael Paciaroni (2020–2026) (Note: From December 2024 to March 2025, he worked as a co-coach alongside Maxime Tchoutakian.)
- Maxime Tchoutakian (December 2024–March 2025) (Note: He worked with Beatriz Haddad Maia as a co-coach alongside Rafael Paciaroni.)
- Carlos Martínez Comet (2026–present)

== In popular culture ==
Haddad Maia is one of the playable characters of the 2024 tennis videogame Tiebreak: Official Game of the ATP and WTA.

== Career statistics ==
=== Grand Slam performance timelines ===
Key
W	F	SF	QF	#R	RR	Q#	DNQ	A	NH

(W) winner; (F) finalist; (SF) semifinalist; (QF) quarterfinalist; (#R) rounds 4, 3, 2, 1; (RR) round-robin stage; (Q#) qualification round; (DNQ) did not qualify; (A) absent; (NH) not held; (SR) strike rate (events won / competed); (W–L) win–loss record.
To avoid confusion and double counting, these charts are updated at the conclusion of a tournament or when the player's participation has ended.

==== Singles ====
Current through the 2026 Wimbledon Championships.

Tournament	2015	2016	2017	2018	2019	2020	2021	2022	2023	2024	2025	2026	SR	W–L	Win %
Australian Open	A	A	A	2R	2R	A	A	2R	1R	3R	3R	1R	0 / 7	7–7	50%
French Open	Q3	Q2	1R	A	Q1	A	A	2R	SF	1R	1R	1R	0 / 6	6–6	50%
Wimbledon	Q1	A	2R	A	2R	NH	Q3	1R	4R	3R	2R	1R	0 / 7	8–7	53%
US Open	A	Q1	1R	Q2	A	A	Q2	2R	2R	QF	4R	A	0 / 5	9–5	64%
Win–loss	0–0	0–0	1–3	1–1	2–2	0–0	0–0	3–4	9–4	8–4	6–4	0–3	0 / 25	30–25	55%

==== Doubles ====
Current through the 2026 Wimbledon Championships.

Tournament	2017	2018	...	2022	2023	2024	2025	2026	SR	W–L	Win %
Australian Open	A	3R		F	2R	3R	3R	A	0 / 5	13–5	72%
French Open	A	A		2R	2R	A	3R	3R	0 / 4	6–4	60%
Wimbledon	3R	A		3R	2R (Note: Withdrew during the tournament. Not counted as a loss.)	1R	3R	A	0 / 5	7–3	70%
US Open	1R	A		3R	QF	3R	2R	A	0 / 5	8–5	62%
Win–loss	2–2	2–1		10–4	6–3	4–3	8–4	2–1	0 / 19	34–17	67%

=== Grand Slam tournament finals ===
==== Doubles: 1 (runner-up) ====
Result	Year	Tournament	Surface	Partner	Opponents	Score
Loss	2022	Australian Open	Hard	(Kazakhstan) Anna Danilina	(Czech Republic) Barbora Krejčíková (Czech Republic) Kateřina Siniaková	7–6^{(7–3)}, 4–6, 4–6

== Awards and Honors ==
2022

- BJK Cup Americas Group I Heart Award
- BJK Cup playoffs Heart Award
- WTA Awards - Most Improved Player
- Prêmio Brasil Olímpico - tennis
- Forbes 30 Under 30 Selection (Sports & Games)

2023

- Prêmio Brasil Olímpico - tennis
- GQ Brasil- Woman of the Year Award

2024

- BJK Cup playoffs Heart Award
- Prêmio Brasil Olímpico - tennis
