= 2016 Latrobe City Traralgon ATP Challenger – Singles =

Singles
- 2016 Latrobe City Traralgon ATP Challenger

Final
- Champion: (Australia) Jordan Thompson
- Runner-up: (Slovenia) Grega Žemlja
- Score: 6−1, 6−2

Events
Singles	Doubles
- Latrobe City Traralgon ATP Challenger

Matthew Ebden was the defending champion but lost in the second round to Marco Trungelliti.

Jordan Thompson won the title after defeating Grega Žemlja 6–1, 6–2 in the final.

== Seeds ==
1. (Australia) Jordan Thompson (champion)
2. (Japan) Yoshihito Nishioka (second round)
3. (Argentina) Marco Trungelliti (semifinals)
4. (Slovenia) Grega Žemlja (final)
5. (Australia) James Duckworth (quarterfinals)
6. (Australia) Matthew Barton (quarterfinals)
7. (Australia) John-Patrick Smith (quarterfinals)
8. (Australia) Marc Polmans (first round)

== Draw ==
Key

- Q = Qualifier
- WC = Wild card
- LL = Lucky loser
- Alt = Alternate
- ITF = ITF entry
- PR = Protected ranking
- SR = Special ranking
- SE = Special exempt
- JE = Junior exempt
- JR = Junior Accelerator Programme entrant
- CO = College Accelerator Programme entrant
- NG = Next Gen Accelerator Program entrant
- w/o = Walkover
- r = Retired
- d = Defaulted

=== Finals ===
Semifinals
1	(Australia) Jordan Thompson	6	6
3	(Argentina) Marco Trungelliti	4	3
4	(Slovenia) Grega Žemlja	6	6
(Australia) Luke Saville	2	4

Final
1	(Australia) Jordan Thompson	6	6
4	(Slovenia) Grega Žemlja	1	2

=== Top half ===
First round
1	(Australia) J Thompson	6	7^{7}
(Australia) S de Waard	2	6^{4}
(Australia) B Mott	2	1
(Australia) D Kelly	6	6
(Australia) M Reid	6	6
(Australia) G Jones	4	4
WC	(Australia) Darren K. Polkinghorne	6^{5}	4
6	(Australia) M Barton	7^{7}	6
3	(Argentina) M Trungelliti	7^{7}	6
Q	(Australia) B Walkin	6^{4}	3
(Australia) H Bourchier	6	2	1
(Australia) M Ebden	4	6	6
Q	(Australia) Gavin van Peperzeel	6	7^{7}
PR	(United States) J Jenkins	2	6^{3}
(Australia) M Banes	6	6
8	(Australia) M Polmans	1	3

Second round
1	(Australia) J Thompson	3	6	7
(Australia) D Kelly	6	4	5
(Australia) M Reid	6^{4}	6	5
6	(Australia) M Barton	7^{7}	3	7
3	(Argentina) M Trungelliti	7^{10}	6
(Australia) M Ebden	6^{8}	2
Q	(Australia) G van Peperzeel	6	6^{4}	7
(Australia) M Banes	3	7^{7}	5

Quarterfinals
1	(Australia) J Thompson	6	6
6	(Australia) M Barton	1	2
3	(Argentina) M Trungelliti	2	6	6
Q	(Australia) G van Peperzeel	6	2	2

Semifinals
1	(Australia) J Thompson	6	6
3	(Argentina) M Trungelliti	4	3

=== Bottom half ===
First round
5	(Australia) J Duckworth	6	6
(New Zealand) F Tearney	2	4
(Australia) O Jasika	6	6
WC	(Australia) A Addison	3	3
(Australia) J Delaney	4	3
(United States) N Pasha	6	6
(Australia) C O'Connell	2	6	4
4	(Slovenia) G Žemlja	6	3	6
7	(Australia) J-P Smith	6	6
(Australia) Daniel Nolan	4	2
WC	(Australia) Harrison Lombe	6	0	2
WC	(Australia) O Anderson	4	6	6
(Australia) L Saville	6	6
Q	(Australia) S Puodziunas	2	1
(Australia) T Fancutt	3	3
2/Q	(Japan) Y Nishioka	6	6

Second round
5	(Australia) J Duckworth	6	6
(Australia) O Jasika	1	3
(United States) N Pasha	2	6	6^{3}
4	(Slovenia) G Žemlja	6	3	7^{7}
7	(Australia) J-P Smith	6	6
WC	(Australia) O Anderson	2	1
(Australia) L Saville	2	6	6
2/Q	(Japan) Y Nishioka	6	3	4

Quarterfinals
5	(Australia) J Duckworth	4	6	3
4	(Slovenia) G Žemlja	6	3	6
7	(Australia) J-P Smith	4	5
(Australia) L Saville	6	7

Semifinals
4	(Slovenia) G Žemlja	6	6
(Australia) L Saville	2	4
