= 2022 Ashleigh Barty tennis season =

2022 tennis player season

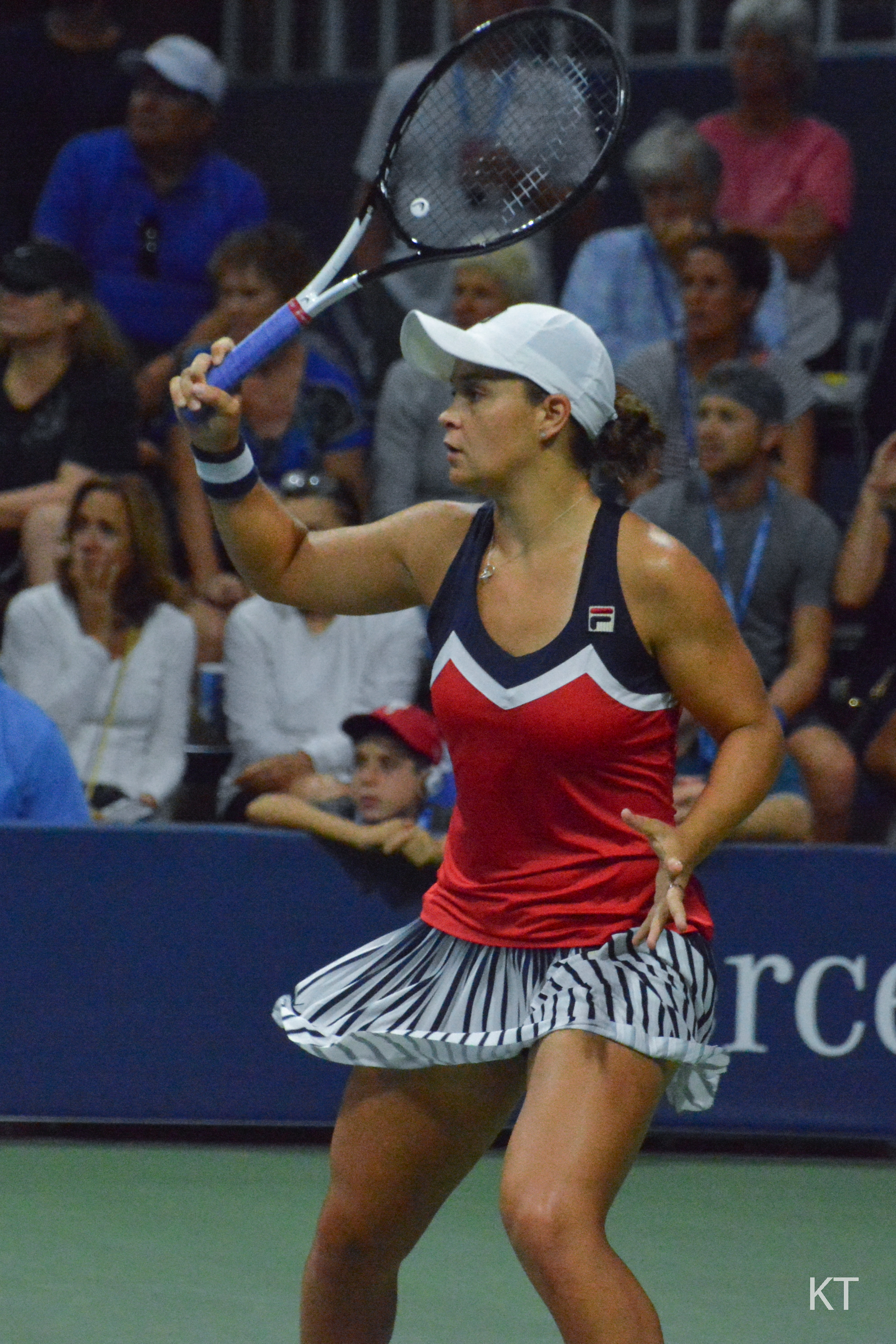
- Barty playing at the 2018 US Open
- Full name: Ashleigh Barty
- Country: Australia
- Calendar prize money: $2,289,320

Singles
- Season record: 11–0
- Calendar titles: 2

Grand Slam & significant results
- Australian Open: W

Doubles
- Season record: 3–0
- Calendar titles: 1

Grand Slam doubles results
- Australian Open: A
- Last updated on: 29 January 2022.

The 2022 Ashleigh Barty tennis season officially began on 3 January 2022 as the start of the 2022 WTA Tour. Ashleigh Barty entered the season as world number 1 player in singles for the third year in a row. She announced her retirement on 23 March 2022.

== All matches ==
Key
| W | F | SF | QF | #R | RR | Q# | P# | DNQ | A | Z# | PO | G | S | B | NMS | NTI | P | NH |

(W) winner; (F) finalist; (SF) semifinalist; (QF) quarterfinalist; (#R) rounds 4, 3, 2, 1; (RR) round-robin stage; (Q#) qualification round; (P#) preliminary round; (DNQ) did not qualify; (A) absent; (Z#) Davis/Fed Cup Zonal Group (with number indication) or (PO) play-off; (G) gold, (S) silver or (B) bronze Olympic/Paralympic medal; (NMS) not a Masters tournament; (NTI) not a Tier I tournament; (P) postponed; (NH) not held; (SR) strike rate (events won / competed); (W–L) win–loss record.
To avoid confusion and double counting, these charts are updated at the conclusion of a tournament or when the player's participation has ended.

=== Singles matches ===
| Tournament | Match | Round | Opponent | Rank | Result | Score |
|---|---|---|---|---|---|---|
| Adelaide International; Adelaide, Australia; WTA 500; Hard, outdoor; 3 January 2021 – 9 January 2022 | – | 1R | Bye | | | |
| Adelaide International; Adelaide, Australia; WTA 500; Hard, outdoor; 3 January 2021 – 9 January 2022 | 1 | 2R | (United States) Coco Gauff | 22 | Win | 4–6, 7–5, 6–1 |
| Adelaide International; Adelaide, Australia; WTA 500; Hard, outdoor; 3 January 2021 – 9 January 2022 | 2 | QF | (United States) Sofia Kenin (6) | 12 | Win | 6–3, 6–4 |
| Adelaide International; Adelaide, Australia; WTA 500; Hard, outdoor; 3 January 2021 – 9 January 2022 | 3 | SF | (Poland) Iga Świątek (5) | 9 | Win | 6–2, 6–4 |
| Adelaide International; Adelaide, Australia; WTA 500; Hard, outdoor; 3 January 2021 – 9 January 2022 | 4 | W | (Kazakhstan) Elena Rybakina (7) | 14 | Win (1) | 6–3, 6–2 |
| Australian Open; Melbourne, Australia; Grand Slam; Hard, outdoor; 17 January 2022 – 30 January 2022 | 5 | 1R | (Ukraine) Lesia Tsurenko (Q) | 119 | Win | 6–0, 6–1 |
| Australian Open; Melbourne, Australia; Grand Slam; Hard, outdoor; 17 January 2022 – 30 January 2022 | 6 | 2R | (Italy) Lucia Bronzetti (Q) | 142 | Win | 6–1, 6–1 |
| Australian Open; Melbourne, Australia; Grand Slam; Hard, outdoor; 17 January 2022 – 30 January 2022 | 7 | 3R | (Italy) Camila Giorgi (30) | 33 | Win | 6–2, 6–3 |
| Australian Open; Melbourne, Australia; Grand Slam; Hard, outdoor; 17 January 2022 – 30 January 2022 | 8 | 4R | (United States) Amanda Anisimova | 60 | Win | 6–4, 6–3 |
| Australian Open; Melbourne, Australia; Grand Slam; Hard, outdoor; 17 January 2022 – 30 January 2022 | 9 | QF | (United States) Jessica Pegula (21) | 21 | Win | 6–2, 6–0 |
| Australian Open; Melbourne, Australia; Grand Slam; Hard, outdoor; 17 January 2022 – 30 January 2022 | 10 | SF | (United States) Madison Keys | 51 | Win | 6–1, 6–3 |
| Australian Open; Melbourne, Australia; Grand Slam; Hard, outdoor; 17 January 2022 – 30 January 2022 | 11 | W | (United States) Danielle Collins (27) | 30 | Win (2) | 6–3, 7–6^{(7–2)} |

=== Doubles matches ===
| Tournament | Match | Round | Opponent | Rank | Result | Score |
|---|---|---|---|---|---|---|
| Adelaide International; Adelaide, Australia; WTA 500; Hard, outdoor; 3 January 2021 – 9 January 2022; Partner: (Australia) Storm Sanders | 1 | 1R | (United States) Caty McNally / (United States) Coco Gauff (4) | 19 / 21 | Win | 6–0, 7–6^{(7–4)} |
| Adelaide International; Adelaide, Australia; WTA 500; Hard, outdoor; 3 January 2021 – 9 January 2022; Partner: (Australia) Storm Sanders | – | QF | (New Zealand) Erin Routliffe / (Canada) Leylah Fernandez | 55 / 74 | Walkover | —N/a |
| Adelaide International; Adelaide, Australia; WTA 500; Hard, outdoor; 3 January 2021 – 9 January 2022; Partner: (Australia) Storm Sanders | 2 | SF | (Ukraine) Nadiia Kichenok / (India) Sania Mirza | 31 / 63 | Win | 6–1, 2–6, [10–8] |
| Adelaide International; Adelaide, Australia; WTA 500; Hard, outdoor; 3 January 2021 – 9 January 2022; Partner: (Australia) Storm Sanders | 3 | W | (Croatia) Darija Jurak Schreiber / (Slovakia) Andreja Klepač (3) | 9 / 20 | Win (1) | 6–1, 6–4 |

== Tournament schedule ==
=== Singles schedule ===
| Date | Tournament | Location | Category | Surface | Previous result | Previous points | New points | Outcome |
|---|---|---|---|---|---|---|---|---|
| 3 January 2021 – 9 January 2022 | Adelaide International | Australia | WTA 500 | Hard | Second round | 1 | 470 | Winner defeated (Kazakhstan) Elena Rybakina; 6–3, 6–2 |
| 17 January 2022 – 30 January 2022 | Australian Open | Australia | Grand Slam | Hard | Quarterfinals | 430 | 2000 | Winner defeated (United States) Danielle Collins; 6–3, 7–6^{(7–2)} |
| Total year-end points | | | | | | | 2470 | |

=== Doubles schedule ===
| Date | Tournament | Location | Category | Surface | Previous result | Previous points | New points | Outcome |
|---|---|---|---|---|---|---|---|---|
| 3 January 2021 – 9 January 2022 | Adelaide International | Australia | WTA 500 | Hard | Did not play | 0 | 470 | Winner defeated (Croatia) Darija Jurak Schreiber / (Slovakia) Andreja Klepač; 6–1, 6–4 |
| Total year-end points | | | | | | | 470 | |

== Yearly records ==
=== Top 10 wins ===
==== Singles ====
| # | Opponent | Rank | Tournament | Surface | Round | Score | ABR |
|---|---|---|---|---|---|---|---|
| 1. | (Poland) Iga Świątek | No. 9 | Adelaide International, Australia | Hard | Semifinals | 6–2, 6–4 | No. 1 |

==== Doubles ====
| # | Partner | Opponents | Rank | Tournament | Surface | Round | Score | ABR |
|---|---|---|---|---|---|---|---|---|
| 1. | (Australia) Storm Sanders | (Croatia) Darija Jurak Schreiber; (Slovakia) Andreja Klepač | No. 9; No. 20 | Adelaide International, Australia | Hard | Final | 6–1, 6–4 | No. 102 |

=== Finals ===
==== Singles: 2 (2 titles) ====
| Legend Grand Slam tournaments (1–0) WTA Tour Championships (0–0) WTA Elite Trophy (0–0) WTA 1000 (0–0) WTA 500 (1–0) WTA 250 (0–0) | Finals by surface Hard (2–0) Clay (0–0) Grass (0–0) | Finals by setting Outdoor (2–0) Indoor (0–0) |

| Result | W–L | Date | Tournament | Tier | Surface | Opponent | Score |
|---|---|---|---|---|---|---|---|
| Win | 1–0 | Jan 2022 | Adelaide International, Australia | WTA 500 | Hard | (Kazakhstan) Elena Rybakina | 6–3, 6–2 |
| Win | 2–0 | Jan 2022 | Australian Open | Grand Slam | Hard | (United States) Danielle Collins | 6–3, 7–6^{(7–2)} |

==== Double: 1 (1 title) ====
| Legend Grand Slam tournaments (0–0) WTA Tour Championships (0–0) WTA Elite Trophy (0–0) WTA 1000 (0–0) WTA 500 (1–0) WTA 250 (0–0) | Finals by surface Hard (1–0) Clay (0–0) Grass (0–0) | Finals by setting Outdoor (1–0) Indoor (0–0) |

| Result | W–L | Date | Tournament | Tier | Surface | Partner | Opponent | Score |
|---|---|---|---|---|---|---|---|---|
| Win | 1–0 | Jan 2022 | Adelaide International, Australia | WTA 500 | Hard | (Australia) Storm Sanders | (Croatia) Darija Jurak Schreiber; (Slovakia) Andreja Klepač | 6–1, 6–4 |

=== Earnings ===
| # | Tournament | Singles Prize money | Doubles Prize money | Year-to-date |
|---|---|---|---|---|
| 1. | Adelaide International | $108,000 | $18,100 | $126,100 |
| 2. | Australian Open | $2,163,220 | 0 | $2,289,320 |
| Total prize money | | $2,271,220 | $18,100 | $2,289,320 |
