= 2022 Adelaide International =

2022 Adelaide International may refer to:

- 2022 Adelaide International 1, an ATP 250 and WTA 500 tournament
- 2022 Adelaide International 2, an ATP 250 and WTA 250 tournament created after several tournaments cancelled by the COVID-19 pandemic
