= 2022 Adelaide International 2 – Men's singles =

Men's singles
- 2022 Adelaide International 2

Final
- Champion: (Australia) Thanasi Kokkinakis
- Runner-up: (France) Arthur Rinderknech
- Score: 6–7^{(6–8)}, 7–6^{(7–5)}, 6–3

Details
- Draw: 28
- Seeds: 8

Events
Singles	men	women
Doubles	men	women
← 2022 ·	Adelaide International	· 2023 →

Thanasi Kokkinakis defeated Arthur Rinderknech in the final, 6–7^{(6–8)}, 7–6^{(7–5)}, 6–3 to win the men's singles title at the 2022 Adelaide International 2. It was his first ATP Tour title, and he won it in his hometown of Adelaide. Kokkinakis saved a match point against Marin Čilić in the semifinals.

This was the second edition of the Adelaide International for 2022.

== Seeds ==
The top four seeds received a bye into the second round.

1. (France) Gaël Monfils (second round, retired)
2. (United States) John Isner (second round)
3. (Russia) Karen Khachanov (quarterfinals)
4. (Croatia) Marin Čilić (semifinals)
5. (South Africa) Lloyd Harris (first round)
6. (Kazakhstan) Alexander Bublik (first round)
7. (United States) Frances Tiafoe (first round)
8. (Hungary) Márton Fucsovics (second round)

== Draw ==
Key

- Q = Qualifier
- WC = Wild card
- LL = Lucky loser
- Alt = Alternate
- ITF = ITF entry
- PR = Protected ranking
- SR = Special ranking
- SE = Special exempt
- JE = Junior exempt
- JR = Junior Accelerator Programme entrant
- CO = College Accelerator Programme entrant
- NG = Next Gen Accelerator Program entrant
- w/o = Walkover
- r = Retired
- d = Defaulted

=== Finals ===
Semifinals
Q	(France) Corentin Moutet	1	3
(France) Arthur Rinderknech	6	6
4	(Croatia) Marin Čilić	2	6	6^{10}
WC	(Australia) Thanasi Kokkinakis	6	3	7^{12}

Final
(France) Arthur Rinderknech	7^{8}	6^{5}	3
WC	(Australia) Thanasi Kokkinakis	6^{6}	7^{7}	6

=== Top half ===
First round
LL	(Brazil) T Monteiro	1	6	6
Q	(Japan) Y Nishioka	6	3	4
Q	(France) C Moutet	6	6
(Germany) J-L Struff	2	4
(Netherlands) B van de Zandschulp	3	6^{4}
8	(Hungary) M Fucsovics	6	7^{7}
(Italy) G Mager	4	7	6
Q	(Belarus) E Gerasimov	6	5	4
(United States) M McDonald	3	7^{7}	3
(France) A Rinderknech	6	6^{5}	6
(South Korea) S-w Kwon	5	7	6
5	(South Africa) L Harris	7	5	4

Second round
1	(France) G Monfils	7^{7}	3	0^{r}
LL	(Brazil) T Monteiro	6^{2}	6	1
Q	(France) C Moutet	6	6
8	(Hungary) M Fucsovics	2	2
3	(Russia) K Khachanov	7	6
(Italy) G Mager	5	3
(France) A Rinderknech	5	6	6
(South Korea) S-w Kwon	7	3	2

Quarterfinals
LL	(Brazil) T Monteiro	4	4
Q	(France) C Moutet	6	6
3	(Russia) K Khachanov	6^{7}	5
(France) A Rinderknech	7^{9}	7

Semifinals
Q	(France) C Moutet	1	3
(France) A Rinderknech	6	6

=== Bottom half ===
First round
7	(United States) F Tiafoe	2	3
(United States) T Paul	6	6
LL	(Spain) R Carballés Baena	3	3
(France) B Bonzi	6	6
(Australia) J Millman	2	2
(Spain) J Munar	6	6
6	(Kazakhstan) A Bublik	6^{5}	2
WC	(Australia) A Vukic	7^{7}	6
WC	(Australia) A Bolt	4	4
Q	(United States) S Johnson	6	6
WC	(Australia) T Kokkinakis	6	6
(France) B Paire	4	0

Second round
(United States) T Paul	6	7^{8}
(France) B Bonzi	4	6^{6}
(Spain) J Munar	6^{6}	2
4	(Croatia) M Čilić	7^{8}	6
WC	(Australia) A Vukic	6	7
Q	(United States) S Johnson	4	5
WC	(Australia) T Kokkinakis	6^{5}	7^{7}	7^{7}
2	(United States) J Isner	7^{7}	6^{5}	6^{4}

Quarterfinals
(United States) T Paul	4	6	3
4	(Croatia) M Čilić	6	2	6
WC	(Australia) A Vukic	7^{7}	3	2
WC	(Australia) T Kokkinakis	6^{5}	6	6

Semifinals
4	(Croatia) M Čilić	2	6	6^{10}
WC	(Australia) T Kokkinakis	6	3	7^{12}

== Qualifying ==
=== Seeds ===
1. (Spain) Roberto Carballés Baena (qualifying competition, lucky loser)
2. (Japan) Yoshihito Nishioka (qualified)
3. (United States) Steve Johnson (qualified)
4. (Germany) Peter Gojowczyk (withdrew)
5. (Brazil) Thiago Monteiro (qualifying competition, lucky loser)
6. (Argentina) Juan Manuel Cerúndolo (first round)
7. (France) Corentin Moutet (qualified)
8. (Sweden) Mikael Ymer (withdrew)

=== Qualifiers ===
1. (France) Corentin Moutet
2. (Japan) Yoshihito Nishioka
3. (United States) Steve Johnson
4. (Belarus) Egor Gerasimov

=== Lucky losers ===
1. (Brazil) Thiago Monteiro
2. (Spain) Roberto Carballés Baena

=== Draw ===
==== First qualifier ====
First round
1	(Spain) Roberto Carballés Baena	6	6
Alt	(Australia) John-Patrick Smith	3	4
(Denmark) Holger Rune	5	3
7	(France) Corentin Moutet	7	6

Qualifying competition
1	(Spain) Roberto Carballés Baena	4	7^{8}	1
7	(France) Corentin Moutet	6	6^{6}	6

==== Second qualifier ====
First round
2	(Japan) Yoshihito Nishioka	6	6
WC	(Australia) Aaron Addison	2	3
WC	(Australia) Thomas Fancutt	4	4
Alt	(Australia) Luke Saville	6	6

Qualifying competition
2	(Japan) Yoshihito Nishioka	7^{7}	6^{0}	6
Alt	(Australia) Luke Saville	6^{4}	7^{7}	2

==== Third qualifier ====
First round
3	(United States) Steve Johnson	4	7^{7}	6
(Germany) Oscar Otte	6	6^{5}	3
Alt	(Australia) Harry Bourchier	6^{6}	1
5	(Brazil) Thiago Monteiro	7^{8}	6

Qualifying competition
3	(United States) Steve Johnson	7^{8}	6
5	(Brazil) Thiago Monteiro	6^{6}	4

==== Fourth qualifier ====
First round
Alt	(Monaco) Hugo Nys	4	6	7
Alt	(Australia) Brandon Walkin	6	3	5
Alt	(Belarus) Egor Gerasimov	6	5	7
6	(Argentina) Juan Manuel Cerúndolo	4	7	5

Qualifying competition
Alt	(Monaco) Hugo Nys	2	3
Alt	(Belarus) Egor Gerasimov	6	6
