= 2016 Latrobe City Traralgon ATP Challenger – Doubles =

Doubles
- 2016 Latrobe City Traralgon ATP Challenger

Final
- Champions: (Australia) Matt Reid (Australia) John-Patrick Smith
- Runners-up: (Australia) Matthew Barton (Australia) Matthew Ebden
- Score: 6–4, 6–4

Events
Singles	Doubles
- Latrobe City Traralgon ATP Challenger

Dayne Kelly and Marinko Matosevic were the defending champions but only Kelly defended his title, partnering Christopher O'Connell. Kelly lost in the first round to Jarmere Jenkins and Anderson Reed.

Matt Reid and John-Patrick Smith won the title after defeating Matthew Barton and Matthew Ebden 6–4, 6–4 in the final.

== Seeds ==
1. (Australia) Matt Reid / (Australia) John-Patrick Smith (champions)
2. (Australia) Luke Saville / (Australia) Jordan Thompson (quarterfinals)
3. (Australia) Steven de Waard / (Australia) Marc Polmans (quarterfinals)
4. (Australia) Maverick Banes / (Australia) Gavin van Peperzeel (quarterfinals)

== Draw ==
Key

- Q = Qualifier
- WC = Wild card
- LL = Lucky loser
- Alt = Alternate
- ITF = ITF entry
- PR = Protected ranking
- SR = Special ranking
- SE = Special exempt
- JE = Junior exempt
- JR = Junior Accelerator Programme entrant
- CO = College Accelerator Programme entrant
- NG = Next Gen Accelerator Program entrant
- w/o = Walkover
- r = Retired
- d = Defaulted

First round
1	(Australia) M Reid (Australia) J-P Smith	w/o
WC	(Australia) C Puttergill (Australia) B Walkin
WC	(Australia) Alexander Babanine (Australia) Chanchai Sookton-eng	1	2
WC	(Australia) Daniel Guccione (Australia) O Jasika	6	6
3	(Australia) S de Waard (Australia) M Polmans	6	6
(Australia) J Delaney (Australia) Daniel Nolan	3	4
(Australia) D Kelly (Australia) C O'Connell	7	4	[8]
(United States) J Jenkins (United States) A Reed	5	6	[10]
(Australia) G Jones (New Zealand) F Tearney	4	6^{6}
(Australia) M Barton (Australia) M Ebden	6	7^{8}
(Australia) A Addison (Australia) J Beale	1	2
4	(Australia) M Banes (Australia) Gavin van Peperzeel	6	6
(Australia) T Fancutt (Australia) S Puodziunas	3	4
(Australia) H Bourchier (Australia) J Frawley	6	6
(United States) N Pasha (Australia) Darren K. Polkinghorne	4	2
2	(Australia) L Saville (Australia) J Thompson	6	6

Quarterfinals
1	(Australia) M Reid (Australia) J-P Smith	6	6
WC	(Australia) D Guccione (Australia) O Jasika	1	0
3	(Australia) S de Waard (Australia) M Polmans	1	4
(United States) J Jenkins (United States) A Reed	6	6
(Australia) M Barton (Australia) M Ebden	6	6
4	(Australia) M Banes (Australia) G van Peperzeel	3	3
(Australia) H Bourchier (Australia) J Frawley	2	6	[10]
2	(Australia) L Saville (Australia) J Thompson	6	2	[7]

Semifinals
1	(Australia) M Reid (Australia) J-P Smith	6	3	[10]
(United States) J Jenkins (United States) A Reed	4	6	[7]
(Australia) M Barton (Australia) M Ebden	7^{7}	6
(Australia) H Bourchier (Australia) J Frawley	6^{5}	3

Final
1	(Australia) M Reid (Australia) J-P Smith	6	6
(Australia) M Barton (Australia) M Ebden	4	4
