= 2022 Adelaide International 2 – Men's doubles =

Men's doubles
- 2022 Adelaide International 2

Final
- Champions: (Netherlands) Wesley Koolhof (United Kingdom) Neal Skupski
- Runners-up: (Uruguay) Ariel Behar (Ecuador) Gonzalo Escobar
- Score: 7–6^{(7–5)}, 6–4

Events
Singles	men	women
Doubles	men	women
- Adelaide International

Wesley Koolhof and Neal Skupski defeated Ariel Behar and Gonzalo Escobar in the final, 7–6^{(7–5)}, 6–4, to win the men's doubles tennis title at the 2022 Adelaide International 2.

This was the second edition of the Adelaide International held in 2022.

== Seeds ==
All seeds received a bye into the second round.

1. (United States) Rajeev Ram / (United Kingdom) Joe Salisbury (second round)
2. (Croatia) Ivan Dodig / (Brazil) Marcelo Melo (semifinals)
3. (Netherlands) Wesley Koolhof / (United Kingdom) Neal Skupski (champions)
4. (Belgium) Sander Gillé / (Belgium) Joran Vliegen (quarterfinals)
5. (South Africa) Raven Klaasen / (Japan) Ben McLachlan (second round)
6. (Uruguay) Ariel Behar / (Ecuador) Gonzalo Escobar (final)
7. (Mexico) Santiago González / (Argentina) Andrés Molteni (quarterfinals)
8. (Bosnia and Herzegovina) Tomislav Brkić / (Serbia) Nikola Ćaćić (semifinals)

== Draw ==
Key

- Q = Qualifier
- WC = Wild card
- LL = Lucky loser
- Alt = Alternate
- ITF = ITF entry
- PR = Protected ranking
- SR = Special ranking
- SE = Special exempt
- JE = Junior exempt
- JR = Junior Accelerator Programme entrant
- CO = College Accelerator Programme entrant
- NG = Next Gen Accelerator Program entrant
- w/o = Walkover
- r = Retired
- d = Defaulted

=== Finals ===
Semifinals
6	(Uruguay) Ariel Behar (Ecuador) Gonzalo Escobar	6	6^{5}	[10]
8	(Bosnia and Herzegovina) Tomislav Brkić (Serbia) Nikola Ćaćić	4	7^{7}	[6]
3	(Netherlands) Wesley Koolhof (United Kingdom) Neal Skupski	6	6
2	(Croatia) Ivan Dodig (Brazil) Marcelo Melo	4	1

Final
6	(Uruguay) Ariel Behar (Ecuador) Gonzalo Escobar	6^{5}	4
3	(Netherlands) Wesley Koolhof (United Kingdom) Neal Skupski	7^{7}	6

=== Top half ===
First round
WC	(Australia) H Bourchier (Australia) B Walkin	6^{4}	3
WC	(Australia) A Addison (Australia) T Fancutt	7^{7}	6
(United States) N Monroe (Denmark) H Rune	6	7^{7}
(South Korea) S-w Kwon (New Zealand) A Sitak	3	6^{1}
(United States) S Johnson (United States) A Krajicek	6	3	[10]
(India) R Bopanna (France) É Roger-Vasselin	4	6	[3]
(Kazakhstan) A Bublik (Poland) J Zieliński	6	4	[10]
Alt	(Australia) C Puttergill (Australia) A Taylor	1	6	[8]

Second round
1	(United States) R Ram (United Kingdom) J Salisbury	7^{7}	4	[8]
WC	(Australia) A Addison (Australia) T Fancutt	6^{4}	6	[10]
(United States) N Monroe (Denmark) H Rune	2	4
6	(Uruguay) A Behar (Ecuador) G Escobar	6	6
4	(Belgium) S Gillé (Belgium) J Vliegen	5	6	[10]
(United States) S Johnson (United States) A Krajicek	7	3	[5]
(Kazakhstan) A Bublik (Poland) J Zieliński	3	2
8	(Bosnia and Herzegovina) T Brkić (Serbia) N Ćaćić	6	6

Quarterfinals
WC	(Australia) A Addison (Australia) T Fancutt	6	5	[6]
6	(Uruguay) A Behar (Ecuador) G Escobar	3	7	[10]
4	(Belgium) S Gillé (Belgium) J Vliegen	2	3
8	(Bosnia and Herzegovina) T Brkić (Serbia) N Ćaćić	6	6

Semifinals
6	(Uruguay) A Behar (Ecuador) G Escobar	6	6^{5}	[10]
8	(Bosnia and Herzegovina) T Brkić (Serbia) N Ćaćić	4	7^{7}	[6]

=== Bottom half ===
First round
(Israel) J Erlich (Sweden) A Göransson	7^{7}	5	[6]
(Germany) O Otte (France) B Paire	6^{2}	7	[10]
(Australia) L Saville (Australia) J-P Smith	6^{5}	6	[10]
(France) B Bonzi (Monaco) H Nys	7^{7}	3	[2]
(Serbia) I Sabanov (Serbia) M Sabanov	6	3	[10]
(United Kingdom) D Inglot (United Kingdom) K Skupski	2	6	[7]
(United States) E King (United States) A Lawson	6^{2}	2
(Philippines) T Huey (Denmark) F Nielsen	7^{7}	6

Second round
5	(South Africa) R Klaasen (Japan) B McLachlan	6^{5}	7^{11}	[4]
(Germany) O Otte (France) B Paire	7^{7}	6^{9}	[10]
(Australia) L Saville (Australia) J-P Smith	6^{2}	6^{3}
3	(Netherlands) W Koolhof (United Kingdom) N Skupski	7^{7}	7^{7}
7	(Mexico) S González (Argentina) A Molteni	6	7^{8}
(Serbia) I Sabanov (Serbia) M Sabanov	3	6^{6}
(Philippines) T Huey (Denmark) F Nielsen	3	6	[4]
2	(Croatia) I Dodig (Brazil) M Melo	6	1	[10]

Quarterfinals
(Germany) O Otte (France) B Paire	4	0^{r}
3	(Netherlands) W Koolhof (United Kingdom) N Skupski	6	1
7	(Mexico) S González (Argentina) A Molteni	6	4	[8]
2	(Croatia) I Dodig (Brazil) M Melo	3	6	[10]

Semifinals
3	(Netherlands) W Koolhof (United Kingdom) N Skupski	6	6
2	(Croatia) I Dodig (Brazil) M Melo	4	1
