= 2016 Latrobe City Traralgon ATP Challenger =

Tennis tournament

- Date: 24–30 October 2016
- Edition: 5th
- Prize money: $50,000
- Surface: Hard
- Location: Traralgon, Australia

Champions

Singles
- (Australia) Jordan Thompson

Doubles
- (Australia) Matt Reid / (Australia) John-Patrick Smith
- Latrobe City Traralgon ATP Challenger

The 2016 Latrobe City Traralgon ATP Challenger is a professional tennis tournament played on outdoor hard court. It is the fifth edition of the tournament which was part of the 2016 ATP Challenger Tour. It took place in Traralgon, Australia between 24 and 30 October 2016.

== Singles main draw entrants ==
=== Seeds ===
Country	Player	Rank^{1}	Seed
AUS	Jordan Thompson	93	1
JPN	Yoshihito Nishioka	101	2
ARG	Marco Trungelliti	153	3
SLO	Grega Žemlja	157	4
AUS	James Duckworth	159	5
AUS	Matthew Barton	183	6
AUS	John-Patrick Smith	258	7
AUS	Marc Polmans	271	8

- Rankings are as of 17 October 2016.

=== Other entrants ===
The following players received wildcards into the singles main draw:

- (Australia) Aaron Addison
- (Australia) Oliver Anderson
- (Australia) Harrison Lombe
- (Australia) Darren Polkinghorne

The following players received entry into the singles main draw under a protected ranking:

- (United States) Jarmere Jenkins

The following players received entry from the qualifying draw:

- (Japan) Yoshihito Nishioka
- (Australia) Gavin van Peperzeel
- (Australia) Scott Puodziunas
- (Australia) Brandon Walkin

== Champions ==
=== Singles ===
- (Australia) Jordan Thompson def. (Slovenia) Grega Žemlja, 6–1, 6–2.

=== Doubles ===
- (Australia) Matt Reid / (Australia) John-Patrick Smith def. (Australia) Matthew Barton / (Australia) Matthew Ebden, 6–4, 6–4.
