= 2022 Adelaide International 2 – Women's singles =

Women's singles
- 2022 Adelaide International 2

Final
- Champion: (United States) Madison Keys
- Runner-up: (United States) Alison Riske
- Score: 6–1, 6–2

Details
- Draw: 32
- Seeds: 8

Events
Singles	men	women
Doubles	men	women
← 2022 ·	Adelaide International	· 2023 →

Madison Keys defeated Alison Riske in the final, 6–1, 6–2 to win the women's singles tennis title at the 2022 Adelaide International 2.

== Seeds ==
1. (Belarus) Aryna Sabalenka (first round)
2. (Ukraine) Elina Svitolina (first round)
3. (United States) Coco Gauff (semifinals)
4. (Slovenia) Tamara Zidanšek (semifinals, withdrew)
5. (Russia) Veronika Kudermetova (withdrew)
6. (Czech Republic) Markéta Vondroušová (second round)
7. (Switzerland) Jil Teichmann (first round)
8. (Russia) Liudmila Samsonova (quarterfinals)
9. (Romania) Sorana Cîrstea (first round)

== Draw ==
=== Key ===
- Q = Qualifier
- WC = Wild card
- LL = Lucky loser
- Alt = Alternate
- SE = Special exempt
- PR = Protected ranking
- ITF = ITF entry
- JE = Junior exempt
- w/o = Walkover
- r = Retired
- d = Defaulted
- SR = Special ranking

=== Finals ===
Semifinals
(United States) Alison Riske	w/o
4	(Slovenia) Tamara Zidanšek
3	(United States) Coco Gauff	6	2	5
(United States) Madison Keys	3	6	7

Final
(United States) Alison Riske	1	2
(United States) Madison Keys	6	6

=== Top half ===
First round
1/WC	(Belarus) A Sabalenka	7	1	5
Q	(Sweden) R Peterson	5	6	7
Q	(Russia) A Potapova	5	6	1
(United States) M Brengle	7	4	6
(Poland) M Linette	4	4
(United States) A Riske	6	6
(Ukraine) A Kalinina	6	6
9	(Romania) S Cîrstea	3	2
4	(Slovenia) T Zidanšek	2	6	7^{7}
Q	(United Kingdom) H Watson	6	2	6^{4}
WC	(Australia) M Inglis	6	1	6
LL	(Montenegro) D Kovinić	4	6	2
(Italy) J Paolini	7	6
Q	(Australia) S Sanders	5	2
Q	(United States) L Davis	1	7^{7}	6
7	(Switzerland) J Teichmann	6	6^{3}	4

Second round
Q	(Sweden) R Peterson	3	2
(United States) M Brengle	6	6
(United States) A Riske	6	6
(Ukraine) A Kalinina	1	3
4	(Slovenia) T Zidanšek	6	6
WC	(Australia) M Inglis	2	1
(Italy) J Paolini	6	4	4
Q	(United States) L Davis	4	6	6

Quarterfinals
(United States) M Brengle	3^{r}
(United States) A Riske	3
4	(Slovenia) T Zidanšek	7^{7}	7^{9}
Q	(United States) L Davis	6^{4}	6^{7}

Semifinals
(United States) A Riske	w/o
4	(Slovenia) T Zidanšek

=== Bottom half ===
First round
6	(Czech Republic) M Vondroušová	5	6	6
(Switzerland) V Golubic	7	4	3
Alt	(Croatia) A Konjuh	6	7^{7}
WC	(Australia) D Saville	2	6^{4}
(Ukraine) M Kostyuk	6	6
(United States) S Rogers	3	4
(Czech Republic) K Siniaková	1	2
3	(United States) C Gauff	6	6
8	(Russia) L Samsonova	7^{7}	6
(Egypt) M Sherif	6^{2}	4
(Spain) N Párrizas Díaz	6	6
(France) A Cornet	4	4
Q	(Ukraine) D Yastremska	4	6	3
(Czech Republic) T Martincová	6	3	6
(United States) M Keys	6	6
2	(Ukraine) E Svitolina	2	4

Second round
6	(Czech Republic) M Vondroušová	6	2	6^{3}
Alt	(Croatia) A Konjuh	4	6	7^{7}
(Ukraine) M Kostyuk	3	7	3
3	(United States) C Gauff	6	5	6
8	(Russia) L Samsonova	6	6
(Spain) N Párrizas Díaz	2	1
(Czech Republic) T Martincová	1	3
(United States) M Keys	6	6

Quarterfinals
Alt	(Croatia) A Konjuh	3	4
3	(United States) C Gauff	6	6
8	(Russia) L Samsonova	3	6	3
(United States) M Keys	6	3	6

Semifinals
3	(United States) C Gauff	6	2	5
(United States) M Keys	3	6	7

== Qualifying ==
=== Seeds ===
1. (Belgium) Alison Van Uytvanck (qualifying competition)
2. (Croatia) Ana Konjuh (moved to main draw)
3. (Russia) Anastasia Potapova (qualified)
4. (United Kingdom) Heather Watson (qualified)
5. (Sweden) Rebecca Peterson (qualified)
6. (United States) Lauren Davis (qualified)
7. (Czech Republic) Marie Bouzková (withdrew)
8. (Montenegro) Danka Kovinić (qualifying competition, lucky loser)
9. (Slovakia) Kristína Kučová (qualifying competition)
10. (Ukraine) Dayana Yastremska (qualified)
11. (Slovenia) Kaja Juvan (first round, retired)
12. (China) Wang Qiang (first round)

=== Qualifiers ===
1. (Ukraine) Dayana Yastremska
2. (Australia) Storm Sanders
3. (Russia) Anastasia Potapova
4. (United Kingdom) Heather Watson
5. (Sweden) Rebecca Peterson
6. (United States) Lauren Davis

=== Lucky losers ===
1. (Montenegro) Danka Kovinić

=== Qualifying draw ===
==== First qualifier ====
First round
1	(Belgium) Alison Van Uytvanck	6	6
WC	(Australia) Olivia Tjandramulia	1	0
(Switzerland) Joanne Züger	5	4
10	(Ukraine) Dayana Yastremska	7	6

Qualifying competition
1	(Belgium) Alison Van Uytvanck	6	4	4
10	(Ukraine) Dayana Yastremska	3	6	6

==== Second qualifier ====
First round
Alt	(Poland) Katarzyna Piter	2	0
PR	(Belgium) Kirsten Flipkens	6	6
WC	(Australia) Storm Sanders	3	6	6
12	(China) Wang Qiang	6	4	3

Qualifying competition
PR	(Belgium) Kirsten Flipkens	3	4
WC	(Australia) Storm Sanders	6	6

==== Third qualifier ====
First round
3	(Russia) Anastasia Potapova	6	6
(France) Harmony Tan	2	1
WC	(Australia) Tina Nadine Smith	2	4
9	(Slovakia) Kristína Kučová	6	6

Qualifying competition
3	(Russia) Anastasia Potapova	6	6
9	(Slovakia) Kristína Kučová	1	3

==== Fourth qualifier ====
First round
4	(United Kingdom) Heather Watson	6	4	6
(Thailand) Peangtarn Plipuech	4	6	3
(Indonesia) Aldila Sutjiadi	1	4
8	(Montenegro) Danka Kovinić	6	6

Qualifying competition
4	(United Kingdom) Heather Watson	6	6
8	(Montenegro) Danka Kovinić	1	4

==== Fifth qualifier ====
First round
5	(Sweden) Rebecca Peterson	6	7
(Norway) Ulrikke Eikeri	3	5
(China) Wang Xiyu	6	6
Alt	(Japan) Makoto Ninomiya	1	2

Qualifying competition
5	(Sweden) Rebecca Peterson	6	6
(China) Wang Xiyu	1	4

==== Sixth qualifier ====
First round
6	(United States) Lauren Davis	6	6
WC	(Australia) Annerly Poulos	3	3
(Japan) Eri Hozumi	2	6	0
11	(Slovenia) Kaja Juvan	6	2	0^{r}

Qualifying competition
6	(United States) Lauren Davis	6	1	6
(Japan) Eri Hozumi	3	6	1
