= 2022 Adelaide International 1 – Men's singles =

Men's singles
- 2022 Adelaide International 1

Final
- Champion: (France) Gaël Monfils
- Runner-up: (Russia) Karen Khachanov
- Score: 6–4, 6–4

Details
- Draw: 28 (3 WC, 4 Q)
- Seeds: 8

Events
Singles	men	women
Doubles	men	women
← 2020 ·	Adelaide International	· 2022 →

Gaël Monfils defeated Karen Khachanov in the final, 6–4, 6–4 to win the men's singles tennis title at the 2022 Adelaide International 1.

Andrey Rublev was the reigning champion from when the tournament was last held in 2020, but chose not to participate this year.

Corentin Moutet's default marks the 19th consecutive year since 2004 with at least one default between the ATP and the Challenger tours.

== Seeds ==
The top four seeds received a bye into the second round.

1. (France) Gaël Monfils (champion)
2. (Russia) Karen Khachanov (final)
3. (Croatia) Marin Čilić (semifinals)
4. (United States) Frances Tiafoe (second round)
5. (Hungary) Márton Fucsovics (first round)
6. (United States) Tommy Paul (quarterfinals)
7. (Serbia) Laslo Djere (quarterfinals)
8. (South Korea) Kwon Soon-woo (second round)

== Draw ==
=== Key ===
- Q = Qualifier
- WC = Wild card
- LL = Lucky loser
- Alt = Alternate
- SE = Special exempt
- PR = Protected ranking
- ITF = ITF entry
- JE = Junior exempt
- w/o = Walkover
- r = Retired
- d = Defaulted
- SR = Special ranking

=== Finals ===
Semifinals
1	(France) Gaël Monfils	7	6
WC	(Australia) Thanasi Kokkinakis	5	0
3	(Croatia) Marin Čilić	6^{3}	3
2	(Russia) Karen Khachanov	7^{7}	6

Final
1	(France) Gaël Monfils	6	6
2	(Russia) Karen Khachanov	4	4

=== Top half ===
First round
(Argentina) JM Cerúndolo	6	6
WC	(Australia) A Bolt	2	4
(Italy) L Musetti	4	7^{7}	3
Q	(Japan) T Daniel	6	6^{5}	6
(Czech Republic) J Veselý	4	6	4
6	(United States) T Paul	6	4	6
WC	(Australia) T Kokkinakis	6	6
(Australia) J Millman	4	3
(France) B Bonzi	5	5
(Sweden) M Ymer	7	7
(Japan) Y Nishioka	1	2
8	(South Korea) S-w Kwon	6	6

Second round
1	(France) G Monfils	6	6
(Argentina) JM Cerúndolo	2	1
Q	(Japan) T Daniel	4	7^{7}	4
6	(United States) T Paul	6	6^{1}	6
4	(United States) F Tiafoe	6	5	1
WC	(Australia) T Kokkinakis	3	7	6
(Sweden) M Ymer	6	6
8	(South Korea) S-w Kwon	3	2

Quarterfinals
1	(France) G Monfils	6	6
6	(United States) T Paul	4	1
WC	(Australia) T Kokkinakis	7^{11}	4	6
(Sweden) M Ymer	6^{9}	6	4

Semifinals
1	(France) G Monfils	7	6
WC	(Australia) T Kokkinakis	5	0

=== Bottom half ===
First round
7	(Serbia) L Djere	7	7^{7}
(Spain) R Carballés Baena	5	6^{1}
Q	(Denmark) H Rune	6^{6}	4
(France) C Moutet	7^{8}	6
(Brazil) T Monteiro	6	3	7^{7}
(Germany) D Altmaier	2	6	6^{2}
5	(Hungary) M Fucsovics	3	4
Q	(Belarus) E Gerasimov	6	6
(Italy) G Mager	6	3	6
Q	(Argentina) F Cerúndolo	4	6	4
(United States) S Johnson	6	2	6
WC	(Australia) A Vukic	4	6	4

Second round
7	(Serbia) L Djere	4	7	0
(France) C Moutet	6	5	0^{d}
(Brazil) T Monteiro	4	6^{3}
3	(Croatia) M Čilić	6	7^{7}
Q	(Belarus) E Gerasimov	6	3	6
(Italy) G Mager	1	6	3
(United States) S Johnson	4	6	2
2	(Russia) K Khachanov	6	4	6

Quarterfinals
7	(Serbia) L Djere	3	2
3	(Croatia) M Čilić	6	6
Q	(Belarus) E Gerasimov	5	3
2	(Russia) K Khachanov	7	6

Semifinals
3	(Croatia) M Čilić	6^{3}	3
2	(Russia) K Khachanov	7^{7}	6

== Qualifying ==
=== Seeds ===
1. (Germany) Oscar Otte (qualifying competition)
2. (Denmark) Holger Rune (qualified)
3. (Belarus) Egor Gerasimov (qualified)
4. (Colombia) Daniel Elahi Galán (qualifying competition)
5. (Moldova) Radu Albot (qualifying competition)
6. (Japan) Taro Daniel (qualified)
7. (Argentina) Francisco Cerúndolo (qualified)
8. (Peru) Juan Pablo Varillas (qualifying competition)

=== Qualifiers ===
1. (Japan) Taro Daniel
2. (Denmark) Holger Rune
3. (Belarus) Egor Gerasimov
4. (Argentina) Francisco Cerúndolo

=== Qualifying draw ===
==== First qualifier ====
First round
1	(Germany) Oscar Otte	6	7^{7}
(Austria) Jurij Rodionov	4	6^{5}
WC	(Australia) Edward Winter	4	4
6	(Japan) Taro Daniel	6	6

Qualifying competition
1	(Germany) Oscar Otte	6^{5}	2
6	(Japan) Taro Daniel	7^{7}	6

==== Second qualifier ====
First round
2	(Denmark) Holger Rune	6	7^{9}
(India) Ramkumar Ramanathan	4	6^{7}
(France) Maxime Janvier	4	6^{6}
8	(Peru) Juan Pablo Varillas	6	7^{8}

Qualifying competition
2	(Denmark) Holger Rune	6	6
8	(Peru) Juan Pablo Varillas	2	3

==== Third qualifier ====
First round
3	(Belarus) Egor Gerasimov	6	6
WC	(Australia) Henry Lamchinniah	0	1
Alt	(Australia) John-Patrick Smith	7^{8}	2	4
5	(Moldova) Radu Albot	6^{6}	6	6

Qualifying competition
3	(Belarus) Egor Gerasimov	6	0	6
5	(Moldova) Radu Albot	3	6	2

==== Fourth qualifier ====
First round
4	(Colombia) Daniel Elahi Galán	5	7	6
(Australia) Matthew Ebden	7	5	3
Alt	(Finland) Harri Heliövaara	4	2
7	(Argentina) Francisco Cerúndolo	6	6

Qualifying competition
4	(Colombia) Daniel Elahi Galán	6^{3}	6^{5}
7	(Argentina) Francisco Cerúndolo	7^{7}	7^{7}

== See also ==
- 2022 Adelaide International 2
