= 2023 Adelaide International 1 =

Tennis tournament on the 2023 WTA Tour

- Date: 1–8 January
- Edition: 3rd (ATP); 4th (WTA)
- Category: ATP Tour 250; WTA 500
- Draw: 32S / 24D (ATP); 30S / 24D (WTA)
- Prize money: $672,735 (ATP) $826,837 (WTA)
- Surface: Hard / outdoor
- Location: Adelaide, Australia
- Venue: Memorial Drive Tennis Centre

Champions

Men's singles
- (Serbia) Novak Djokovic

Women's singles
- Aryna Sabalenka

Men's doubles
- (United Kingdom) Lloyd Glasspool / (Finland) Harri Heliövaara

Women's doubles
- (United States) Asia Muhammad / (United States) Taylor Townsend
← 2022 ·	Adelaide International	· 2023 →

The 2023 Adelaide International 1 was a tennis tournament on the 2023 ATP Tour and 2023 WTA Tour. It was a combined ATP Tour 250 and WTA 500 tournament played on outdoor hard courts in Adelaide, South Australia, Australia. This was the fourth edition of the tournament for the women and the third edition for the men. The tournament took place at the Memorial Drive Tennis Centre from 1–8 January 2023 and was followed a week later by the 2023 Adelaide International 2, a combined ATP Tour 250 and WTA 500 tournament, at the same venue. The qualifying rounds were held on 31 December 2022.

== Champions ==
=== Men's singles ===
- (Serbia) Novak Djokovic def. (United States) Sebastian Korda, 6–7^{(8–10)}, 7–6^{(7–3)}, 6–4
- It was Djokovic's 1st title of the year and the 92nd of his career.

=== Women's singles ===
- Aryna Sabalenka def. (Czech Republic) Linda Nosková 6–3, 7–6^{(7–4)}

=== Men's doubles ===
- (United Kingdom) Lloyd Glasspool / (Finland) Harri Heliövaara def. (United Kingdom) Jamie Murray / (New Zealand) Michael Venus, 6–3, 7–6^{(7–3)}

=== Women's doubles ===
- (United States) Asia Muhammad / (United States) Taylor Townsend def. (Australia) Storm Hunter / (Czech Republic) Kateřina Siniaková, 6–2, 7–6^{(7–2)}

== Points & Prize money ==
=== Points distribution ===
Event	W	F	SF	QF	Round of 16	Round of 32	Q	Q2	Q1
Men's singles	250	150	90	45	20	0	12	6	0
Men's doubles*	250	150	90	45	20	0	—	—	—
Women's singles	470	305	185	100	55	1	25	13	1
Women's doubles*	470	305	185	100	1	—	—	—	—

_{*per team}

=== Prize money ===
Event	W	F	SF	QF	Round of 16	Round of 32	Q2	Q1
Men's singles	$94,560	$55,035	$32,150	$18,175	$10,655	$6,340	$3,385	$1,815
Men's doubles *	$33,580	$17,550	$9,260	$5,140	$2,820	$1,570	—	—
Women's singles	$120,150	$74,161	$43,323	$20,465	$11,145	$7,500	$5,590	$2,860
Women's doubles*	$40,100	$24,300	$13,900	$7,200	$5,750	$4,350	—	—

_{*per team}

== ATP singles main draw entrants ==
=== Seeds ===
Country	Player	Rank^{†}	Seed
SRB	Novak Djokovic	5	1
CAN	Félix Auger-Aliassime	6	2
	Daniil Medvedev	7	3
	Andrey Rublev	8	4
DEN	Holger Rune	11	5
ITA	Jannik Sinner	15	6
CAN	Denis Shapovalov	18	7
	Karen Khachanov	20	8

† Rankings are as of 26 December 2022

=== Other entrants ===
The following players received wildcards into the singles main draw:

- (Australia) Thanasi Kokkinakis
- (Australia) Christopher O'Connell
- (Australia) Jordan Thompson

The following player received entry using a protected ranking into the singles main draw:

- (United Kingdom) Kyle Edmund

The following players received entry from the qualifying draw:

- (Australia) Rinky Hijikata
- (South Korea) Kwon Soon-woo
- (Australia) Alexei Popyrin
- Roman Safiullin

=== Withdrawals ===
- (France) Corentin Moutet → replaced by (France) Richard Gasquet
- (United States) Brandon Nakashima → replaced by (Sweden) Mikael Ymer

== ATP doubles main draw entrants ==
=== Seeds ===
Country	Player	Country	Player	Rank^{†}	Seed
NED	Wesley Koolhof	GBR	Neal Skupski	2	1
ESA	Marcelo Arévalo	NED	Jean-Julien Rojer	12	2
GBR	Lloyd Glasspool	FIN	Harri Heliövaara	23	3
GBR	Jamie Murray	NZL	Michael Venus	52	4
COL	Juan Sebastián Cabal	COL	Robert Farah	58	5
NED	Robin Haase	NED	Matwé Middelkoop	66	6
MON	Hugo Nys	POL	Jan Zieliński	75	7
AUS	Matthew Ebden	PAK	Aisam-ul-Haq Qureshi	90	8

† Rankings are as of 26 December 2022

=== Other entrants ===
The following pairs received wildcards into the doubles main draw:

- (Australia) James Duckworth / (Australia) Alexei Popyrin
- (Australia) John Millman / (Australia) Edward Winter

The following pairs received entry as alternates:

- (Japan) Taro Daniel / (Japan) Yoshihito Nishioka
- (France) Quentin Halys / (France) Constant Lestienne

=== Withdrawals ===
- (Serbia) Nikola Ćaćić / (Serbia) Miomir Kecmanović → replaced by (Japan) Taro Daniel / (Japan) Yoshihito Nishioka
- (Croatia) Ivan Dodig / (United States) Austin Krajicek → replaced by (France) Quentin Halys / (France) Constant Lestienne
- (United Kingdom) Jack Draper / (Italy) Jannik Sinner → replaced by (Italy) Jannik Sinner / (Italy) Lorenzo Sonego
- (Australia) Matthew Ebden / (France) Nicolas Mahut → replaced by (Australia) Matthew Ebden / (Pakistan) Aisam-ul-Haq Qureshi
- (United States) Sebastian Korda / (United States) Brandon Nakashima → replaced by (United States) Sebastian Korda / (Canada) Denis Shapovalov

== WTA singles main draw entrants ==
=== Seeds ===
Country	Player	Rank^{†}	Seed
TUN	Ons Jabeur	2	1
	Aryna Sabalenka	5	2
	Daria Kasatkina	8	3
	Veronika Kudermetova	9	4
USA	Danielle Collins	14	5
EST	Anett Kontaveit	17	6
LAT	Jeļena Ostapenko	18	7
	Ekaterina Alexandrova	19	8

† Rankings are as of 26 December 2022

=== Other entrants ===
The following players received wildcard entry into the singles main draw:

- (Australia) Jaimee Fourlis
- (Australia) Priscilla Hon
- (Spain) Garbiñe Muguruza

The following players received entry using a protected ranking into the singles main draw:

- (Canada) Bianca Andreescu
- (Czech Republic) Markéta Vondroušová

The following players received entry from the qualifying draw:

- (Switzerland) Viktorija Golubic
- (Ukraine) Anhelina Kalinina
- (Ukraine) Marta Kostyuk
- (United States) Claire Liu
- (Czech Republic) Linda Nosková
- (United States) Shelby Rogers

== WTA doubles main draw entrants ==
=== Seeds ===
Country	Player	Country	Player	Rank^{†}	Seed
AUS	Storm Hunter	CZE	Kateřina Siniaková	11	1
UKR	Lyudmyla Kichenok	LAT	Jeļena Ostapenko	23	2
USA	Nicole Melichar-Martinez	AUS	Ellen Perez	39	3
JPN	Shuko Aoyama	JPN	Ena Shibahara	45	4
TPE	Chan Hao-ching	CHN	Yang Zhaoxuan	52	5
USA	Asia Muhammad	USA	Taylor Townsend	59	6
	Anastasia Potapova		Yana Sizikova	89	7
KAZ	Anna Danilina		Anna Kalinskaya	90	8

† Rankings are as of 26 December 2022

=== Other entrants ===
The following pair received a wildcard into the doubles main draw:

- (Australia) Kimberly Birrell / (Australia) Priscilla Hon

=== Withdrawals ===
- (Kazakhstan) Anna Danilina / (India) Sania Mirza → replaced by (Kazakhstan) Anna Danilina / Anna Kalinskaya
