= 2023 Adelaide International 1 – Men's doubles =

Men's doubles
- 2023 Adelaide International 1

Final
- Champions: (United Kingdom) Lloyd Glasspool (Finland) Harri Heliövaara
- Runners-up: (United Kingdom) Jamie Murray (New Zealand) Michael Venus
- Score: 6–3, 7–6^{(7–3)}

Events
Singles	men	women
Doubles	men	women
- Adelaide International

Lloyd Glasspool and Harri Heliövaara defeated Jamie Murray and Michael Venus in the final, 6–3, 7–6^{(7–3)} to win the men's doubles tennis title at the 2023 Adelaide International 1.

Rohan Bopanna and Ramkumar Ramanathan were the reigning champions, but chose to compete in Pune instead.

== Seeds ==
All seeds received a bye into the second round.

1. (Netherlands) Wesley Koolhof / (United Kingdom) Neal Skupski (second round)
2. (El Salvador) Marcelo Arévalo / (Netherlands) Jean-Julien Rojer (second round)
3. (United Kingdom) Lloyd Glasspool / (Finland) Harri Heliövaara (champions)
4. (United Kingdom) Jamie Murray / (New Zealand) Michael Venus (final)
5. (Colombia) Juan Sebastián Cabal / (Colombia) Robert Farah (quarterfinals)
6. (Netherlands) Robin Haase / (Netherlands) Matwé Middelkoop (quarterfinals)
7. (Monaco) Hugo Nys / (Poland) Jan Zieliński (quarterfinals)
8. (Australia) Matthew Ebden / (Pakistan) Aisam-ul-Haq Qureshi (second round)

== Draw ==
Key

- Q = Qualifier
- WC = Wild card
- LL = Lucky loser
- Alt = Alternate
- ITF = ITF entry
- PR = Protected ranking
- SR = Special ranking
- SE = Special exempt
- JE = Junior exempt
- JR = Junior Accelerator Programme entrant
- CO = College Accelerator Programme entrant
- NG = Next Gen Accelerator Program entrant
- w/o = Walkover
- r = Retired
- d = Defaulted

=== Finals ===
Semifinals
(United States) Mackenzie McDonald (Brazil) Marcelo Melo	2	3
3	(United Kingdom) Lloyd Glasspool (Finland) Harri Heliövaara	6	6
4	(United Kingdom) Jamie Murray (New Zealand) Michael Venus	7	7
(Bosnia and Herzegovina) Tomislav Brkić (Ecuador) Gonzalo Escobar	5	5

Final
3	(United Kingdom) Lloyd Glasspool (Finland) Harri Heliövaara	6	7^{7}
4	(United Kingdom) Jamie Murray (New Zealand) Michael Venus	3	6^{3}

=== Top half ===
First round
(United States) M McDonald (Brazil) M Melo	6	0
(Australia) T Kokkinakis (Australia) J Thompson	3	0^{r}
PR	(France) J Chardy (France) F Martin	6	3	[8]
K Khachanov; A Rublev	3	6	[10]
(Austria) A Erler (Austria) L Miedler	3	7	[10]
Alt	(France) Q Halys (France) C Lestienne	6	5	[6]
WC	(Australia) J Millman (Australia) E Winter	1	6	[10]
(Colombia) N Barrientos (Uruguay) A Behar	6	4	[12]

Second round
1	(Netherlands) W Koolhof (United Kingdom) N Skupski	3	7	[10]
(United States) M McDonald (Brazil) M Melo	6	5	[12]
K Khachanov; A Rublev	1	6^{4}
7	(Monaco) H Nys (Poland) J Zieliński	6	7^{7}
3	(United Kingdom) L Glasspool (Finland) H Heliövaara	6	7^{7}
(Austria) A Erler (Austria) L Miedler	3	6^{4}
(Colombia) N Barrientos (Uruguay) A Behar	6^{3}	6^{5}
6	(Netherlands) R Haase (Netherlands) M Middelkoop	7^{7}	7^{7}

Quarterfinals
(United States) M McDonald (Brazil) M Melo	7^{7}	6
7	(Monaco) H Nys (Poland) J Zieliński	6^{2}	3
3	(United Kingdom) L Glasspool (Finland) H Heliövaara	6	5	[10]
6	(Netherlands) R Haase (Netherlands) M Middelkoop	3	7	[6]

Semifinals
(United States) M McDonald (Brazil) M Melo	2	3
3	(United Kingdom) L Glasspool (Finland) H Heliövaara	6	6

=== Bottom half ===
First round
WC	(Australia) J Duckworth (Australia) A Popyrin	4	3
(Italy) J Sinner (Italy) L Sonego	6	6
(Kazakhstan) A Golubev (Kazakhstan) A Nedovyesov	6^{8}	6^{4}
(United States) M Cressy (France) A Olivetti	7^{10}	7^{7}
(United States) S Korda (Canada) D Shapovalov	6	6
Alt	(Japan) T Daniel (Japan) Y Nishioka	3	4
(Serbia) N Djokovic (Canada) V Pospisil	6	3	[5]
(Bosnia and Herzegovina) T Brkić (Ecuador) G Escobar	4	6	[10]

Second round
8	(Australia) M Ebden (Pakistan) A-u-H Qureshi	6^{1}	7	[8]
(Italy) J Sinner (Italy) L Sonego	7^{7}	5	[10]
(United States) M Cressy (France) A Olivetti	6	3	[2]
4	(United Kingdom) J Murray (New Zealand) M Venus	3	6	[10]
5	(Colombia) JS Cabal (Colombia) R Farah	w/o
(United States) S Korda (Canada) D Shapovalov
(Bosnia and Herzegovina) T Brkić (Ecuador) G Escobar	7^{8}	6
2	(El Salvador) M Arévalo (Netherlands) J-J Rojer	6^{6}	2

Quarterfinals
(Italy) J Sinner (Italy) L Sonego
4	(United Kingdom) J Murray (New Zealand) M Venus	w/o
5	(Colombia) JS Cabal (Colombia) R Farah	6^{6}	7^{7}	[5]
(Bosnia and Herzegovina) T Brkić (Ecuador) G Escobar	7^{8}	6^{4}	[10]

Semifinals
4	(United Kingdom) J Murray (New Zealand) M Venus	7	7
(Bosnia and Herzegovina) T Brkić (Ecuador) G Escobar	5	5
