= 2022 Adelaide International 2 – Women's doubles =

Women's doubles
- 2022 Adelaide International 2

Final
- Champions: (Japan) Eri Hozumi (Japan) Makoto Ninomiya
- Runners-up: (Czech Republic) Tereza Martincová (Czech Republic) Markéta Vondroušová
- Score: 1–6, 7–6^{(7–4)}, [10–7]

Events
Singles	men	women
Doubles	men	women
← 2022 ·	Adelaide International	· 2023 →

Eri Hozumi and Makoto Ninomiya defeated Tereza Martincová and Markéta Vondroušová in the final, 1–6, 7–6^{(7–4)}, [10–7], to win the women's doubles tennis title at the 2022 Adelaide International 2 and their first title together as a duo. Hozumi and Ninomiya saved a match point in the final.

This was the second edition of the Adelaide International held in 2022.

== Seeds ==
1. (Czech Republic) Marie Bouzková / (Czech Republic) Lucie Hradecká (withdrew)
2. (Ukraine) Nadiia Kichenok / (India) Sania Mirza (first round)
3. (Japan) Eri Hozumi / (Japan) Makoto Ninomiya (champions)
4. (Japan) Miyu Kato / (United States) Sabrina Santamaria (first round)

== Draw ==
=== Key ===
- Q = Qualifier
- WC = Wild card
- LL = Lucky loser
- Alt = Alternate
- SE = Special exempt
- PR = Protected ranking
- ITF = ITF entry
- JE = Junior exempt
- w/o = Walkover
- r = Retired
- d = Defaulted
- SR = Special ranking

=== Draw ===
First round
Alt	(Slovakia) K Kučová (United Kingdom) T Moore	3	0
(Ukraine) M Kostyuk (Poland) K Piter	6	6
WC	(Australia) A Poulos (Australia) TN Smith	1	1
(Poland) A Rosolska (New Zealand) E Routliffe	6	6
3	(Japan) E Hozumi (Japan) M Ninomiya	6	6
(Sweden) R Peterson (Russia) A Potapova	1	2
(United States) K Christian (Belarus) L Marozava	2	7^{7}	[10]
(Germany) J Lohoff (Belgium) K Zimmermann	6	6^{5}	[4]
(France) E Lechemia (United States) I Neel	6	1	[10]
(Thailand) P Plipuech (Indonesia) A Sutjiadi	3	6	[5]
(Norway) U Eikeri (Montenegro) D Kovinić	6	6
4	(Japan) M Kato (United States) S Santamaria	4	4
(Switzerland) V Golubic (Switzerland) J Teichmann	6	6
WC	(Australia) M Inglis (Australia) O Tjandramulia	1	2
(Czech Republic) T Martincová (Czech Republic) M Vondroušová	6	6
2	(Ukraine) N Kichenok (India) S Mirza	3	3

Quarterfinals
(Ukraine) M Kostyuk (Poland) K Piter	5	3
(Poland) A Rosolska (New Zealand) E Routliffe	7	6
3	(Japan) E Hozumi (Japan) M Ninomiya	6	6
(United States) K Christian (Belarus) L Marozava	3	1
(France) E Lechemia (United States) I Neel	2	6	[10]
(Norway) U Eikeri (Montenegro) D Kovinić	6	4	[4]
(Switzerland) V Golubic (Switzerland) J Teichmann	6^{4}	2
(Czech Republic) T Martincová (Czech Republic) M Vondroušová	7^{7}	6

Semifinals
(Poland) A Rosolska (New Zealand) E Routliffe	3	7^{8}	[8]
3	(Japan) E Hozumi (Japan) M Ninomiya	6	6^{6}	[10]
(France) E Lechemia (United States) I Neel	1	1
(Czech Republic) T Martincová (Czech Republic) M Vondroušová	6	6

Final
3	(Japan) E Hozumi (Japan) M Ninomiya	1	7^{7}	[10]
(Czech Republic) T Martincová (Czech Republic) M Vondroušová	6	6^{4}	[7]
