= 2022 Adelaide International 1 – Men's doubles =

Men's doubles
- 2022 Adelaide International 1

Final
- Champions: (India) Rohan Bopanna (India) Ramkumar Ramanathan
- Runners-up: (Croatia) Ivan Dodig (Brazil) Marcelo Melo
- Score: 7–6^{(8–6)}, 6–1

Events
Singles	men	women
Doubles	men	women
- Adelaide International

Rohan Bopanna and Ramkumar Ramanathan defeated Ivan Dodig and Marcelo Melo in the final, 7–6^{(8–6)}, 6–1 to win the men's doubles tennis title at the 2022 Adelaide International 1.

Máximo González and Fabrice Martin were the reigning champions from when the tournament was last held in 2020, but chose to compete in the ATP Cup instead.

== Seeds ==
All seeds received a bye into the second round.

1. (Croatia) Ivan Dodig / (Brazil) Marcelo Melo (final)
2. (Belgium) Sander Gillé / (Belgium) Joran Vliegen (second round)
3. (Uruguay) Ariel Behar / (Ecuador) Gonzalo Escobar (semifinals)
4. (Bosnia and Herzegovina) Tomislav Brkić / (Mexico) Santiago González (semifinals)
5. (Australia) Matthew Ebden / (Australia) John-Patrick Smith (second round)
6. (Israel) Jonathan Erlich / (Sweden) André Göransson (second round)
7. (United Kingdom) Lloyd Glasspool / (Finland) Harri Heliövaara (second round)
8. (United States) Nathaniel Lammons / (United States) Jackson Withrow (second round)

== Draw ==
=== Finals ===
Semifinals
1	(Croatia) Ivan Dodig (Brazil) Marcelo Melo	6	6^{6}	[10]
3	(Uruguay) Ariel Behar (Ecuador) Gonzalo Escobar	3	7^{8}	[2]
4	(Bosnia and Herzegovina) Tomislav Brkić (Mexico) Santiago González	2	4
(India) Rohan Bopanna (India) Ramkumar Ramanathan	6	6

Final
1	(Croatia) Ivan Dodig (Brazil) Marcelo Melo	6^{6}	1
(India) Rohan Bopanna (India) Ramkumar Ramanathan	7^{8}	6

=== Top half ===
First round
(United States) H Reese (Netherlands) S Verbeek	6^{4}	2
(United States) N Monroe (United States) F Tiafoe	7^{7}	6
(Italy) G Mager (Italy) L Musetti	3	2
(Hungary) M Fucsovics (United States) T Paul	6	6
(Spain) R Carballés Baena (Serbia) L Đere	4	6	[8]
(South Korea) S-w Kwon (New Zealand) A Sitak	6	1	[10]
(Germany) D Altmaier (Peru) JP Varillas	3	6	[3]
(United States) S Johnson (Japan) Y Nishioka	6	3	[10]

Second round
1	(Croatia) I Dodig (Brazil) M Melo	6^{3}	7	[10]
(United States) N Monroe (United States) F Tiafoe	7^{7}	5	[8]
(Hungary) M Fucsovics (United States) T Paul	3	6	[10]
5	(Australia) M Ebden (Australia) J-P Smith	6	4	[7]
3	(Uruguay) A Behar (Ecuador) G Escobar	7	6
(South Korea) S-w Kwon (New Zealand) A Sitak	5	1
(United States) S Johnson (Japan) Y Nishioka	6	7^{7}
6	(Israel) J Erlich (Sweden) A Göransson	0	6^{4}

Quarterfinals
1	(Croatia) I Dodig (Brazil) M Melo	6	6
(Hungary) M Fucsovics (United States) T Paul	4	2
3	(Uruguay) A Behar (Ecuador) G Escobar	7^{7}	6
(United States) S Johnson (Japan) Y Nishioka	6^{5}	3

Semifinals
1	(Croatia) I Dodig (Brazil) M Melo	6	6^{6}	[10]
3	(Uruguay) A Behar (Ecuador) G Escobar	3	7^{8}	[2]

=== Bottom half ===
First round
WC	(Australia) A Vukic (Australia) E Winter	7^{7}	6
(Australia) A Taylor (Australia) J Taylor	6^{5}	4
(United States) A Lawson (Czech Republic) J Veselý	6^{3}	2
(Philippines) T Huey (Denmark) F Nielsen	7^{7}	6
(India) R Bopanna (India) R Ramanathan	6	6
(United States) J Cerretani (Brazil) F Romboli	2	1
(France) B Bonzi (Monaco) H Nys	6	7^{10}
WC	(Australia) A Bolt (Australia) T Kokkinakis	2	6^{8}

Second round
7	(United Kingdom) L Glasspool (Finland) H Heliövaara	3	6	[6]
WC	(Australia) A Vukic (Australia) E Winter	6	4	[10]
(Philippines) T Huey (Denmark) F Nielsen	6^{4}	6	[8]
4	(Bosnia and Herzegovina) T Brkić (Mexico) S González	7^{7}	4	[10]
8	(United States) N Lammons (United States) J Withrow	7^{7}	6^{3}	[4]
(India) R Bopanna (India) R Ramanathan	6^{4}	7^{7}	[10]
(France) B Bonzi (Monaco) H Nys	4	7^{7}	[10]
2	(Belgium) S Gillé (Belgium) J Vliegen	6	6^{5}	[7]

Quarterfinals
WC	(Australia) A Vukic (Australia) E Winter	2	3
4	(Bosnia and Herzegovina) T Brkić (Mexico) S González	6	6
(India) R Bopanna (India) R Ramanathan	6	6
(France) B Bonzi (Monaco) H Nys	1	3

Semifinals
4	(Bosnia and Herzegovina) T Brkić (Mexico) S González	2	4
(India) R Bopanna (India) R Ramanathan	6	6
