= 2023 Adelaide International 1 – Men's singles =

Men's singles
- 2023 Adelaide International 1

Final
- Champion: (Serbia) Novak Djokovic
- Runner-up: (United States) Sebastian Korda
- Score: 6–7^{(8–10)}, 7–6^{(7–3)}, 6–4

Details
- Draw: 32 (3 WC, 4 Q)
- Seeds: 8

Events
Singles	men	women
Doubles	men	women
← 2022 ·	Adelaide International	· 2023 →

Novak Djokovic defeated Sebastian Korda in the final, 6–7^{(8–10)}, 7–6^{(7–3)}, 6–4 to win the men's singles title at the 2023 Adelaide International 1. He saved a championship point en route to his 92nd ATP Tour singles title, equaling Rafael Nadal's tally for the fourth-most men's singles titles in the Open Era.

Gaël Monfils was the reigning champion, but chose not to participate this year.

== Seeds ==
1. (Serbia) Novak Djokovic (champion)
2. (Canada) Félix Auger-Aliassime (first round)
3. Daniil Medvedev (semifinals)
4. Andrey Rublev (first round)
5. (Denmark) Holger Rune (first round)
6. (Italy) Jannik Sinner (quarterfinals)
7. (Canada) Denis Shapovalov (quarterfinals)
8. Karen Khachanov (quarterfinals)

== Draw ==
Key

- Q = Qualifier
- WC = Wild card
- LL = Lucky loser
- Alt = Alternate
- ITF = ITF entry
- PR = Protected ranking
- SR = Special ranking
- SE = Special exempt
- JE = Junior exempt
- JR = Junior Accelerator Programme entrant
- CO = College Accelerator Programme entrant
- NG = Next Gen Accelerator Program entrant
- w/o = Walkover
- r = Retired
- d = Defaulted

=== Finals ===
Semifinals
1	(Serbia) Novak Djokovic	6	6
3	Daniil Medvedev	3	4
(United States) Sebastian Korda	7^{7}	1
(Japan) Yoshihito Nishioka	6^{5}	0^{r}

Final
1	(Serbia) Novak Djokovic	6^{8}	7^{7}	6
(United States) Sebastian Korda	7^{10}	6^{3}	4

=== Top half ===
First round
1	(Serbia) N Djokovic	6	6
(France) C Lestienne	3	2
WC	(Australia) J Thompson	3	4
(France) Q Halys	6	6
(Sweden) M Ymer	4	2
Q	R Safiullin	6	6
Q	(Australia) R Hijikata	6	4	3
7	(Canada) D Shapovalov	2	6	6
3	D Medvedev	7^{8}	2
(Italy) L Sonego	6^{6}	1^{r}
(Serbia) M Kecmanović	6	6
WC	(Australia) C O'Connell	4	4
Q	(South Korea) S-w Kwon	2	1
(United Kingdom) J Draper	6	6
(Argentina) P Cachin	2	4
8	K Khachanov	6	6

Second round
1	(Serbia) N Djokovic	7^{7}	7^{7}
(France) Q Halys	6^{3}	6^{5}
Q	R Safiullin	4	3
7	(Canada) D Shapovalov	6	6
3	D Medvedev	6	6
(Serbia) M Kecmanović	0	3
(United Kingdom) J Draper	4	2
8	K Khachanov	6	6

Quarterfinals
1	(Serbia) N Djokovic	6	6
7	(Canada) D Shapovalov	3	4
3	D Medvedev	6	6
8	K Khachanov	3	3

Semifinals
1	(Serbia) N Djokovic	6	6
3	D Medvedev	3	4

=== Bottom half ===
First round
6	(Italy) J Sinner	6	6
PR	(United Kingdom) K Edmund	3	2
WC	(Australia) T Kokkinakis	7^{7}	7^{9}
(United States) M Cressy	6^{4}	6^{7}
(United Kingdom) A Murray	6^{3}	3
(United States) S Korda	7^{7}	6
(Spain) R Bautista Agut	4	6	6
4	A Rublev	6	3	4
5	(Denmark) H Rune	6	4	4
(Japan) Y Nishioka	2	6	6
(United States) M McDonald	6	0
(Colombia) DE Galán	3	0^{r}
(United States) M Giron	7^{7}	6^{6}	7
(France) R Gasquet	6^{5}	7^{8}	5
Q	(Australia) A Popyrin	6	7^{7}
2	(Canada) F Auger-Aliassime	4	6^{5}

Second round
6	(Italy) J Sinner	7^{7}	6
WC	(Australia) T Kokkinakis	6^{2}	4
(United States) S Korda	6	6
(Spain) R Bautista Agut	4	4
(Japan) Y Nishioka	6	6
(United States) M McDonald	4	3
(United States) M Giron	6	4	3
Q	(Australia) A Popyrin	4	6	6

Quarterfinals
6	(Italy) J Sinner	5	1
(United States) S Korda	7	6
(Japan) Y Nishioka	7^{7}	6^{8}	6
Q	(Australia) A Popyrin	6^{4}	7^{10}	2

Semifinals
(United States) S Korda	7^{7}	1
(Japan) Y Nishioka	6^{5}	0^{r}

== Qualifying ==
=== Seeds ===
1. (South Korea) Kwon Soon-woo (qualified)
2. (France) Ugo Humbert (first round)
3. Roman Safiullin (qualified)
4. (France) Grégoire Barrère (first round)
5. (Japan) Taro Daniel (qualifying competition)
6. (United States) Ben Shelton (first round)
7. (Canada) Vasek Pospisil (qualifying competition)
8. (China) Zhang Zhizhen (first round)

=== Qualifiers ===
1. (South Korea) Kwon Soon-woo
2. (Australia) Alexei Popyrin
3. Roman Safiullin
4. (Australia) Rinky Hijikata

=== Qualifying draw ===
==== First qualifier ====
First round
1	(South Korea) Kwon Soon-woo	6	6
(Austria) Dominic Thiem	4	1
WC	(Australia) Edward Winter	1	0
5	(Japan) Taro Daniel	6	6

Qualifying competition
1	(South Korea) Kwon Soon-woo	7^{7}	4	7^{7}
5	(Japan) Taro Daniel	6^{4}	6	6^{2}

==== Second qualifier ====
First round
2	(France) Ugo Humbert	3	6^{1}
(China) Wu Yibing	6	7^{7}
(Australia) Alexei Popyrin	6	6
8	(China) Zhang Zhizhen	2	3

Qualifying competition
(China) Wu Yibing	4	6	5
(Australia) Alexei Popyrin	6	3	7

==== Third qualifier ====
First round
3	Roman Safiullin	6^{2}	6	6
(Germany) Yannick Hanfmann	7^{7}	4	4
(Australia) John Millman	5	2
7	(Canada) Vasek Pospisil	7	6

Qualifying competition
3	Roman Safiullin	6^{5}	6	6
7	(Canada) Vasek Pospisil	7^{7}	2	3

==== Fourth qualifier ====
First round
4	(France) Grégoire Barrère	2	3
WC	(Australia) Rinky Hijikata	6	6
(Australia) James Duckworth	6	7^{7}
6	(United States) Ben Shelton	3	6^{2}

Qualifying competition
WC	(Australia) Rinky Hijikata	7	6
(Australia) James Duckworth	5	4
