= 2023 Adelaide International 1 – Women's doubles =

Women's doubles
- 2023 Adelaide International 1

Final
- Champions: (United States) Asia Muhammad (United States) Taylor Townsend
- Runners-up: (Australia) Storm Hunter (Czech Republic) Kateřina Siniaková
- Score: 6–2, 7–6^{(7–2)}

Events
Singles	men	women
Doubles	men	women
← 2022 ·	Adelaide International	· 2023 →

Asia Muhammad and Taylor Townsend defeated the defending champion Storm Hunter and her partner Kateřina Siniaková in the final, 6–2, 7–6^{(7–2)} to win the women's doubles tennis title at the 2023 Adelaide International 1.

Ashleigh Barty and Hunter were the reigning champions, but Barty retired from professional tennis in March 2022.

== Seeds ==
All seeds received a bye into the second round.

1. (Australia) Storm Hunter / (Czech Republic) Kateřina Siniaková (final)
2. (Ukraine) Lyudmyla Kichenok / (Latvia) Jeļena Ostapenko (semifinals)
3. (United States) Nicole Melichar-Martinez / (Australia) Ellen Perez (second round)
4. (Japan) Shuko Aoyama / (Japan) Ena Shibahara (quarterfinals)
5. (Chinese Taipei) Chan Hao-ching / (China) Yang Zhaoxuan (second round)
6. (United States) Asia Muhammad / (United States) Taylor Townsend (champions)
7. Anastasia Potapova / Yana Sizikova (second round)
8. (Kazakhstan) Anna Danilina / Anna Kalinskaya (second round)

== Draw ==
=== Key ===
- Q = Qualifier
- WC = Wild card
- LL = Lucky loser
- Alt = Alternate
- SE = Special exempt
- PR = Protected ranking
- ITF = ITF entry
- JE = Junior exempt
- w/o = Walkover
- r = Retired
- d = Defaulted
- SR = Special ranking

=== Finals ===
Semifinals
1	(Australia) Storm Hunter (Czech Republic) Kateřina Siniaková	6	1	[10]
Lidziya Marozava; Aryna Sabalenka	4	6	[3]
6	(United States) Asia Muhammad (United States) Taylor Townsend	6	1	[10]
2	(Ukraine) Lyudmyla Kichenok (Latvia) Jeļena Ostapenko	4	6	[8]

Final
1	(Australia) Storm Hunter (Czech Republic) Kateřina Siniaková	2	6^{2}
6	(United States) Asia Muhammad (United States) Taylor Townsend	6	7^{7}

=== Top half ===
First round
(Ukraine) M Kostyuk (Egypt) M Sherif	2	3
V Kudermetova; L Samsonova	6	6
PR	(Czech Republic) M Kolodziejová (Czech Republic) M Vondroušová	7	6
(Slovakia) T Mihalíková; A Sasnovich	5	4
(United Kingdom) A Barnett (United Kingdom) O Nicholls	1	5
(Spain) C Bucșa (Japan) M Ninomiya	6	7
(Hungary) A Bondár (Georgia (country)) O Kalashnikova	6	4	[8]
L Marozava; A Sabalenka	4	6	[10]

Second round
1	(Australia) S Hunter (Czech Republic) K Siniaková	6	6
V Kudermetova; L Samsonova	2	2
PR	(Czech Republic) M Kolodziejová (Czech Republic) M Vondroušová	3	7	[10]
8	(Kazakhstan) A Danilina; A Kalinskaya	6	5	[2]
3	(United States) N Melichar-Martinez (Australia) E Perez	6	4	[8]
(Spain) C Bucșa (Japan) M Ninomiya	3	6	[10]
L Marozava; A Sabalenka	4	6	[10]
5	(Chinese Taipei) H-c Chan (China) Z Yang	6	1	[5]

Quarterfinals
1	(Australia) S Hunter (Czech Republic) K Siniaková	6	6
PR	(Czech Republic) M Kolodziejová (Czech Republic) M Vondroušová	1	2
(Spain) C Bucșa (Japan) M Ninomiya	2	2
L Marozava; A Sabalenka	6	6

Semifinals
1	(Australia) S Hunter (Czech Republic) K Siniaková	6	1	[10]
L Marozava; A Sabalenka	4	6	[3]

=== Bottom half ===
First round
(Hungary) T Babos (France) K Mladenovic	6	6
A Gabueva (United States) A Riske-Amritraj	1	0
(Ukraine) N Kichenok (Belgium) K Zimmermann	7	6
(China) X Han (Germany) V Heisen	5	3
(Georgia (country)) N Dzalamidze; A Panova	2	4
E Alexandrova (China) S Zhang	6	6
WC	(Australia) K Birrell (Australia) P Hon	3	4
(United States) K Christian (United States) S Santamaria	6	6

Second round
6	(United States) A Muhammad (United States) T Townsend	5	6	[10]
(Hungary) T Babos (France) K Mladenovic	7	2	[2]
(Ukraine) N Kichenok (Belgium) K Zimmermann	4	3
4	(Japan) S Aoyama (Japan) E Shibahara	6	6
7	A Potapova; Y Sizikova	3	5
E Alexandrova (China) S Zhang	6	7
(United States) K Christian (United States) S Santamaria	2	6	[7]
2	(Ukraine) L Kichenok (Latvia) J Ostapenko	6	3	[10]

Quarterfinals
6	(United States) A Muhammad (United States) T Townsend	7	6
4	(Japan) S Aoyama (Japan) E Shibahara	5	0
E Alexandrova (China) S Zhang	7	6^{4}	[7]
2	(Ukraine) L Kichenok (Latvia) J Ostapenko	5	7^{7}	[10]

Semifinals
6	(United States) A Muhammad (United States) T Townsend	6	1	[10]
2	(Ukraine) L Kichenok (Latvia) J Ostapenko	4	6	[8]
