= 2022 Adelaide International 1 – Women's doubles =

Women's doubles
- 2022 Adelaide International 1

Final
- Champions: (Australia) Ashleigh Barty (Australia) Storm Sanders
- Runners-up: (Croatia) Darija Jurak Schreiber (Slovenia) Andreja Klepač
- Score: 6–1, 6–4

Events
Singles	men	women
Doubles	men	women
← 2021 ·	Adelaide International	· 2022 →

Ashleigh Barty and Storm Sanders defeated Darija Jurak Schreiber and Andreja Klepač in the final, 6–1, 6–4, to win the women's doubles title at the 2022 Adelaide International 1. For Barty, the victory marked the third occasion in her career where she won both the singles and doubles titles at the same tournament.

Alexa Guarachi and Desirae Krawczyk were the defending champions, but chose not to participate.

== Seeds ==
1. (Japan) Shuko Aoyama / (Japan) Ena Shibahara (first round)
2. (Canada) Gabriela Dabrowski / (Mexico) Giuliana Olmos (first round)
3. (Croatia) Darija Jurak Schreiber / (Slovenia) Andreja Klepač (final)
4. (United States) Coco Gauff / (United States) Caty McNally (first round)

== Draw ==
=== Key ===
- Q = Qualifier
- WC = Wild card
- LL = Lucky loser
- Alt = Alternate
- SE = Special exempt
- PR = Protected ranking
- ITF = ITF entry
- JE = Junior exempt
- w/o = Walkover
- r = Retired
- d = Defaulted
- SR = Special ranking

=== Draw ===
First round
1	(Japan) S Aoyama (Japan) E Shibahara	4	2
(Belarus) V Azarenka (Spain) P Badosa	6	6
(United States) S Kenin (United States) N Melichar-Martinez	6	2	[7]
(Russia) A Blinkova (Norway) U Eikeri	4	6	[10]
3	(Croatia) D Jurak Schreiber (Slovenia) A Klepač	7	6
(Ukraine) K Bondarenko (Ukraine) L Kichenok	5	3
(Slovenia) K Juvan (Slovenia) T Zidanšek	6	3	[7]
(Czech Republic) M Bouzková (Czech Republic) L Hradecká	1	6	[10]
(Canada) L Fernandez (New Zealand) E Routliffe	7^{7}	4	[10]
(China) Y Xu (China) Z Yang	6^{4}	6	[7]
(Australia) A Barty (Australia) S Sanders	6	7^{7}
4	(United States) C Gauff (United States) C McNally	0	6^{4}
WC	(Australia) P Hon (Australia) C Kempenaers-Pocz	2	5
(United States) S Rogers (United Kingdom) H Watson	6	7
(Ukraine) N Kichenok (India) S Mirza	1	6	[10]
2	(Canada) G Dabrowski (Mexico) G Olmos	6	3	[8]

Quarterfinals
(Belarus) V Azarenka (Spain) P Badosa	6	7
(Russia) A Blinkova (Norway) U Eikeri	2	5
3	(Croatia) D Jurak Schreiber (Slovenia) A Klepač	7	1
(Czech Republic) M Bouzková (Czech Republic) L Hradecká	5	1^{r}
(Canada) L Fernandez (New Zealand) E Routliffe
(Australia) A Barty (Australia) S Sanders	w/o
(United States) S Rogers (United Kingdom) H Watson	0	6	[5]
(Ukraine) N Kichenok (India) S Mirza	6	1	[10]

Semifinals
(Belarus) V Azarenka (Spain) P Badosa
3	(Croatia) D Jurak Schreiber (Slovenia) A Klepač	w/o
(Australia) A Barty (Australia) S Sanders	6	2	[10]
(Ukraine) N Kichenok (India) S Mirza	1	6	[8]

Final
3	(Croatia) D Jurak Schreiber (Slovenia) A Klepač	1	4
(Australia) A Barty (Australia) S Sanders	6	6
