= Oliver Anderson =

Australian tennis player

- Country (sports): Australia
- Residence: Brisbane, Australia
- Born: 30 April 1998 (age 28) Brisbane, Australia
- Height: 1.75 m (5 ft 9 in)
- Plays: Right-handed (two-handed backhand)
- Coach: Wayne Arthurs, Michael Fox, Dayne Kelly
- Prize money: US $33,054

Singles
- Career record: 0-1
- Career titles: 0
- Highest ranking: No. 639 (11 July 2016)
- Current ranking: No. 1,343 (19 October 2026)

Grand Slam singles results
- Australian Open: Q2 (2016)

Doubles
- Career record: 0-0
- Career titles: 0
- Highest ranking: No. 1,253 (17 October 2016)
- Last updated on: 21 October 2026.

Oliver Anderson (born 30 April 1998) is an Australian professional tennis player. He has a career-high ATP singles ranking of No. 639 achieved on 11 July 2016 and a doubles ranking of No. 1,253 achieved on 17 October 2016. Anderson was convicted and temporarily suspended from playing professional tennis due to being found guilty of match fixing his first round match at the 2016 Latrobe City Traralgon ATP Challenger.

Anderson is best known for winning the 2016 Australian Open – Boys' singles title over Jurabek Karimov. Anderson retired from tennis aged 20 in 2018, following a guilty charge of match fixing. Anderson returned to tennis in 2024.

== Tennis career ==
Anderson made his professional debut at the age of 14 in March 2013 when he received a wildcard entry into an Australian futures tournament in his home state of Queensland. He lost in the first round of both the singles and doubles tournaments. Anderson secured his first ranking point in September 2013 when he defeated Jay Andrijic in the first round of an Australian futures tournament held in Cairns. He continued to improve his ranking through 2014 and 2015 with several wins spread across the challengers tour and the futures circuit.

=== 2016-2017 ===
To begin 2016, Anderson received a qualifying wildcard into his hometown tournament – the Brisbane International. He recorded two upset victories from a set down over the eighth seed Dennis Novikov and the fourth seed Tim Smyczek to qualify for his first ever ATP main draw tournament at the age of 17. He faced Croatian Ivan Dodig in the first round, losing 6–3, 6–2. Anderson was then given a wildcards into the 2016 Australian Open men's qualifying tournament and the junior boys' competition. He was lost in the second round of qualifying tournament but went on to win the junior singles title with a three set win over Uzbekistan's Jurabek Karimov in the final. This was Anderson's first junior grand slam title. Anderson didn't play again until May where he was eliminated in round one of qualifying for Busan and Seoul Challengers. Anderson had a further 4 months off for hip surgery returning to the ITF circuit in September. In October, Anderson was given a wildcard into the Traralgon Challenger, he lost in round 2 to John-Patrick Smith. Anderson ended the year with an ATP ranking of 736.

==== 2017 Match-fixing scandal, suspension and retirement ====
On 5 January 2017, Anderson was charged with match-fixing his first round match at the 2016 Latrobe City Traralgon ATP Challenger in October 2016. Anderson was approached to tank the first set of his first round match against Australian Harrison Lombe. He lost the first set 4–6, but won the next two 6–0, 6–2.

In May 2017, Anderson pleaded guilty to the match-fixing charge and was fined $500 by Latrobe Valley Magistrates Court, Victoria. This was followed by an Independent Hearing Officer who suspended Anderson competing for 19 months from the International Tennis Integrity Agency. Anderson immediately retired at the age of 20.

=== 2024: Return to tennis ===
In March 2024, returned to tennis, qualifying for the Mildura ITF $25k.

== Junior Grand Slam titles ==
=== Singles: 1 ===
Result	Year	Championship	Surface	Opponent	Score
Win	2016	Australian Open	Hard	(Uzbekistan) Jurabek Karimov	6–2, 1–6, 6–1

== ATP Challenger and Futures/ITF World Tennis Tour finals ==
=== Singles: 1 (1 title) ===
Legend (singles) ATP Challenger Tour (0–0) Futures/ITF World Tennis Tour (1–0)	Finals by surface Hard (1–0) Clay (0–0) Grass (0–0) Carpet (0–0)

Result	W–L	Date	Tournament	Tier	Surface	Opponent	Score
Win	1–0	November 2024	M15 Luanda, Angola	ITF World Tennis Tour	Hard	(Latvia) Robert Strombachs	6-4, 3–6, 7-6^{(7–5)}

== See also ==
- Match fixing in tennis
