= 2022 Adelaide International 1 – Women's singles =

Women's singles
- 2022 Adelaide International 1

Final
- Champion: (Australia) Ashleigh Barty
- Runner-up: (Kazakhstan) Elena Rybakina
- Score: 6–3, 6–2

Details
- Draw: 30
- Seeds: 8

Events
Singles	men	women
Doubles	men	women
← 2021 ·	Adelaide International	· 2022 →

Ashleigh Barty defeated Elena Rybakina in the final, 6–3, 6–2 to win the women's singles title at the 2022 Adelaide International 1.

Iga Świątek was the defending champion, but lost in the semifinals to Barty.

== Seeds ==
The top two seeds received a bye into the second round.

1. (Australia) Ashleigh Barty (champion)
2. (Belarus) Aryna Sabalenka (second round)
3. (Greece) Maria Sakkari (second round)
4. (Spain) Paula Badosa (first round)
5. (Poland) Iga Świątek (semifinals)
6. (United States) Sofia Kenin (quarterfinals)
7. (Kazakhstan) Elena Rybakina (final)
8. (Ukraine) Elina Svitolina (first round)

== Draw ==
=== Key ===
- Q = Qualifier
- WC = Wild card
- LL = Lucky loser
- Alt = Alternate
- SE = Special exempt
- PR = Protected ranking
- ITF = ITF entry
- JE = Junior exempt
- w/o = Walkover
- r = Retired
- d = Defaulted
- SR = Special ranking

=== Finals ===
Semifinals
1	(Australia) Ashleigh Barty	6	6
5	(Poland) Iga Świątek	2	4
7	(Kazakhstan) Elena Rybakina	6	6
(Japan) Misaki Doi	4	3

Final
1	(Australia) Ashleigh Barty	6	6
7	(Kazakhstan) Elena Rybakina	3	2

=== Top half ===
First round
(United States) C Gauff	6	6
Q	(Norway) U Eikeri	2	1
(United Kingdom) H Watson	4	6^{5}
(Australia) A Tomljanović	6	7^{7}
Q	(Italy) L Bronzetti	5	5
6	(United States) S Kenin	7	7
4	(Spain) P Badosa	3	2
(Belarus) V Azarenka	6	6
WC	(Australia) P Hon	6^{4}	7	6
(Czech Republic) P Kvitová	7^{7}	5	2
(Russia) E Alexandrova	3	4
(Canada) L Fernandez	6	6
Q	(Australia) D Saville	3	3
5	(Poland) I Świątek	6	6

Second round
1	(Australia) A Barty	4	7	6
(United States) C Gauff	6	5	1
(Australia) A Tomljanović	6	6^{5}	3
6	(United States) S Kenin	3	7^{7}	6
(Belarus) V Azarenka	6	7
WC	(Australia) P Hon	3	5
(Canada) L Fernandez	1	2
5	(Poland) I Świątek	6	6

Quarterfinals
1	(Australia) A Barty	6	6
6	(United States) S Kenin	3	4
(Belarus) V Azarenka	3	6	1
5	(Poland) I Świątek	6	2	6

Semifinals
1	(Australia) A Barty	6	6
5	(Poland) I Świątek	2	4

=== Bottom half ===
First round
7	(Kazakhstan) E Rybakina	6	1	6
WC	(Australia) S Sanders	4	6	1
Q	(Greece) D Papamichail	3	0
Q	(Czech Republic) M Bouzková	6	6
Q	(Australia) M Inglis	1	3
(United States) S Rogers	6	6
(Slovenia) T Zidanšek	2	6	4
3	(Greece) M Sakkari	6	0	6
8	(Ukraine) E Svitolina	7	4	3
(Russia) A Gasanova	5	6	6
(Japan) M Doi	6	3	6
(Slovakia) K Kučová	3	6	1
(Slovenia) K Juvan	6	6
(France) C Paquet	4	2

Second round
7	(Kazakhstan) E Rybakina	6	6
Q	(Czech Republic) M Bouzková	3	4
(United States) S Rogers	7^{7}	2	6
3	(Greece) M Sakkari	6^{5}	6	4
(Russia) A Gasanova	6^{4}	3
(Japan) M Doi	7^{7}	6
(Slovenia) K Juvan	7^{8}	6
2	(Belarus) A Sabalenka	6^{6}	1

Quarterfinals
7	(Kazakhstan) E Rybakina	3	6	6
(United States) S Rogers	6	3	2
(Japan) M Doi	6	4	7^{7}
(Slovenia) K Juvan	3	6	6^{5}

Semifinals
7	(Kazakhstan) E Rybakina	6	6
(Japan) M Doi	4	3

== Qualifying ==
=== Seeds ===
1. (Czech Republic) Marie Bouzková (qualified)
2. (Germany) Anna-Lena Friedsam (first round)
3. (Australia) Maddison Inglis (qualified)
4. (United States) Caty McNally (first round)
5. (Canada) Rebecca Marino (first round)
6. (Switzerland) Stefanie Vögele (qualifying competition)
7. (Italy) Lucia Bronzetti (qualified)
8. (United Kingdom) Katie Boulter (qualifying competition)
9. (United Kingdom) Francesca Jones (first round)
10. (Russia) Anna Blinkova (qualifying competition)
11. (Hungary) Réka Luca Jani (first round)
12. (Switzerland) Susan Bandecchi (first round)

=== Qualifiers ===
1. (Czech Republic) Marie Bouzková
2. (Italy) Lucia Bronzetti
3. (Australia) Maddison Inglis
4. (Australia) Daria Saville
5. (Norway) Ulrikke Eikeri
6. (Greece) Despina Papamichail

=== Qualifying draw ===
==== First qualifier ====
First round
1	(Czech Republic) Marie Bouzková	3	6	7
(United States) Francesca Di Lorenzo	6	1	5
(Romania) Irina Fetecău	6	4	5
10	(Russia) Anna Blinkova	4	6	7

Qualifying competition
1	(Czech Republic) Marie Bouzková	6	6
10	(Russia) Anna Blinkova	4	2

==== Second qualifier ====
First round
2	(Germany) Anna-Lena Friedsam	4	6	5
(Ukraine) Kateryna Bondarenko	6	3	7
WC	(Australia) Abbie Myers	4	1
7	(Italy) Lucia Bronzetti	6	6

Qualifying competition
(Ukraine) Kateryna Bondarenko	6	6^{3}	4
7	(Italy) Lucia Bronzetti	1	7^{7}	6

==== Third qualifier ====
First round
3	(Australia) Maddison Inglis	6	6
WC	(Australia) Alexandra Bozovic	4	4
(Spain) Irene Burillo Escorihuela	6	6
11	(Hungary) Réka Luca Jani	1	4

Qualifying competition
3	(Australia) Maddison Inglis	6	6
(Spain) Irene Burillo Escorihuela	1	4

==== Fourth qualifier ====
First round
4	(United States) Caty McNally	3	4
WC	(Australia) Daria Saville	6	6
(Italy) Lucrezia Stefanini	6^{4}	1
8	(United Kingdom) Katie Boulter	7^{7}	6

Qualifying competition
WC	(Australia) Daria Saville	7	3	6
8	(United Kingdom) Katie Boulter	5	6	4

==== Fifth qualifier ====
First round
5	(Canada) Rebecca Marino	4	4
WC	(Australia) Charlotte Kempenaers-Pocz	6	6
(Norway) Ulrikke Eikeri	6	6
12	(Switzerland) Susan Bandecchi	2	3

Qualifying competition
WC	(Australia) Charlotte Kempenaers-Pocz	6	3	3
(Norway) Ulrikke Eikeri	3	6	6

==== Sixth qualifier ====
First round
6	(Switzerland) Stefanie Vögele	4	6	6
(Germany) Tatjana Maria	6	2	2
(Greece) Despina Papamichail	3	6	6
9	(United Kingdom) Francesca Jones	6	2	1

Qualifying competition
6	(Switzerland) Stefanie Vögele	4	6^{9}
(Greece) Despina Papamichail	6	7^{11}
