= 2023 Adelaide International 1 – Women's singles =

Women's singles
- 2023 Adelaide International 1

Final
- Champion: Aryna Sabalenka
- Runner-up: (Czech Republic) Linda Nosková
- Score: 6–3, 7–6^{(7–4)}

Details
- Draw: 30
- Seeds: 8

Events
| Singles | men | women |
| Doubles | men | women |
- Adelaide International

Aryna Sabalenka defeated Linda Nosková in the final, 6–3, 7–6^{(7–4)} to win the women's singles tennis title at the 2023 Adelaide International 1. She did not drop a set en route to her 11th WTA Tour singles title. Nosková reached her first WTA Tour final after saving a match point in the first qualifying round against Anna Kalinskaya, and a further match point in the quarterfinals against Victoria Azarenka.

Ashleigh Barty was the reigning champion, but retired from professional tennis in March 2022.

== Seeds ==
1. (Tunisia) Ons Jabeur (semifinals)
2. Aryna Sabalenka (champion)
3. Daria Kasatkina (first round)
4. Veronika Kudermetova (quarterfinals)
5. (United States) Danielle Collins (first round)
6. (Estonia) Anett Kontaveit (first round)
7. (Latvia) Jeļena Ostapenko (second round)
8. Ekaterina Alexandrova (first round)

== Draw ==
Key

- Q = Qualifier
- WC = Wild card
- LL = Lucky loser
- Alt = Alternate
- ITF = ITF entry
- PR = Protected ranking
- SR = Special ranking
- SE = Special exempt
- JE = Junior exempt
- JR = Junior Accelerator Programme entrant
- CO = College Accelerator Programme entrant
- NG = Next Gen Accelerator Program entrant
- w/o = Walkover
- r = Retired
- d = Defaulted

=== Finals ===
Semifinals
1 | (Tunisia) Ons Jabeur | 3 | 6 | 3
Q | (Czech Republic) Linda Nosková | 6 | 1 | 6
(Romania) Irina-Camelia Begu | 3 | 2
2 | Aryna Sabalenka | 6 | 6

Final
Q | (Czech Republic) Linda Nosková | 3 | 6^{4}
2 | Aryna Sabalenka | 6 | 7^{7}

=== Top half ===
First round
(Romania) S Cîrstea | 6 | 7^{7}
Q | (Switzerland) V Golubic | 0 | 6^{1}
WC | (Australia) J Fourlis | 1 | 6 | 4
Q | (Ukraine) M Kostyuk | 6 | 3 | 6
(Kazakhstan) E Rybakina | 5 | 6 | 6
5 | (United States) D Collins | 7 | 2 | 3
3 | D Kasatkina | 3 | 7^{7} | 3
Q | (Czech Republic) L Nosková | 6 | 6^{2} | 6
Q | (United States) C Liu | 4 | 6 | 6
WC | (Australia) P Hon | 6 | 3 | 3
Q | (Ukraine) A Kalinina | 6^{9} | 6^{5}
V Azarenka | 7^{11} | 7^{7}
(China) Q Zheng | 6 | 4 | 7^{9}
6 | (Estonia) A Kontaveit | 1 | 6 | 6^{7}

Second round
1 | (Tunisia) O Jabeur | 7^{7} | 6
(Romania) S Cîrstea | 6^{3} | 1
Q | (Ukraine) M Kostyuk | 6^{5} | 6 | 6
(Kazakhstan) E Rybakina | 7^{7} | 2 | 3
Q | (Czech Republic) L Nosková | 6 | 6
Q | (United States) C Liu | 2 | 2
V Azarenka | 6 | 7
(China) Q Zheng | 2 | 5

Quarterfinals
1 | (Tunisia) O Jabeur | 7^{7} | 7
Q | (Ukraine) M Kostyuk | 6^{5} | 5
Q | (Czech Republic) L Nosková | 6 | 6^{3} | 7^{8}
V Azarenka | 4 | 7^{7} | 6^{6}

Semifinals
1 | (Tunisia) O Jabeur | 3 | 6 | 3
Q | (Czech Republic) L Nosková | 6 | 1 | 6

=== Bottom half ===
First round
7 | (Latvia) J Ostapenko | 6 | 6
(Czech Republic) Ka Plíšková | 1 | 3
(Romania) I-C Begu | 3 | 7^{7} | 6
Q | (United States) S Rogers | 6 | 6^{5} | 1
WC | (Spain) G Muguruza | 6 | 6^{3} | 1
PR | (Canada) B Andreescu | 0 | 7^{7} | 6
(United States) A Anisimova | 3 | 0
4 | V Kudermetova | 6 | 6
8 | E Alexandrova | 6 | 3 | 2
PR | (Czech Republic) M Vondroušová | 4 | 6 | 6
(Estonia) K Kanepi | 4 | 6 | 6
A Sasnovich | 6 | 1 | 4
(China) S Zhang | 7 | 3 | 0
L Samsonova | 5 | 6 | 6

Second round
7 | (Latvia) J Ostapenko | 3 | 0
(Romania) I-C Begu | 6 | 6
PR | (Canada) B Andreescu | 4 | 0
4 | V Kudermetova | 6 | 6
PR | (Czech Republic) M Vondroušová | 6 | 6
(Estonia) K Kanepi | 0 | 4
L Samsonova | 6^{8} | 6^{3}
2 | A Sabalenka | 7^{10} | 7^{7}

Quarterfinals
(Romania) I-C Begu | 7 | 6
4 | V Kudermetova | 5 | 4
PR | (Czech Republic) M Vondroušová | 3 | 5
2 | A Sabalenka | 6 | 7

Semifinals
(Romania) I-C Begu | 3 | 2
2 | A Sabalenka | 6 | 6

== Qualifying ==
=== Seeds ===
1. (Ukraine) Anhelina Kalinina (qualified)
2. (United States) Alison Riske-Amritraj (first round)
3. Anastasia Potapova (qualifying competition)
4. (United States) Shelby Rogers (qualified)
5. (Czech Republic) Kateřina Siniaková (qualifying competition)
6. (Egypt) Mayar Sherif (qualifying competition)
7. (Romania) Ana Bogdan (first round)
8. Anna Kalinskaya (first round)
9. (United States) Claire Liu (qualified)
10. (Italy) Jasmine Paolini (first round)
11. (Ukraine) Marta Kostyuk (qualified)
12. (Germany) Tamara Korpatsch (first round)

=== Qualifiers ===
1. (Ukraine) Anhelina Kalinina
2. (Switzerland) Viktorija Golubic
3. (Czech Republic) Linda Nosková
4. (United States) Shelby Rogers
5. (United States) Claire Liu
6. (Ukraine) Marta Kostyuk

=== Qualifying draw ===
==== First qualifier ====
First round
1 | (Ukraine) Anhelina Kalinina | 6 | 6
(Ukraine) Dayana Yastremska | 4 | 4
(Hungary) Anna Bondár | 3 | 7^{8} | 7^{7}
10 | (Italy) Jasmine Paolini | 6 | 6^{6} | 6^{4}

Qualifying competition
1 | (Ukraine) Anhelina Kalinina | 6 | 6
(Hungary) Anna Bondár | 1 | 1

==== Second qualifier ====
First round
2 | (United States) Alison Riske-Amritraj | 2 | 4
(Switzerland) Viktorija Golubic | 6 | 6
WC | (Australia) Storm Hunter | 3 | 6 | 6
12 | (Germany) Tamara Korpatsch | 6 | 3 | 3

Qualifying competition
(Switzerland) Viktorija Golubic | 4 | 6 | 6
WC | (Australia) Storm Hunter | 6 | 3 | 3

==== Third qualifier ====
First round
3 | Anastasia Potapova | 6 | 6
PR | (United States) Taylor Townsend | 0 | 1
(Czech Republic) Linda Nosková | 3 | 6 | 7^{9}
8 | Anna Kalinskaya | 6 | 2 | 6^{7}

Qualifying competition
3 | Anastasia Potapova | 3 | 2
(Czech Republic) Linda Nosková | 6 | 6

==== Fourth qualifier ====
First round
4 | (United States) Shelby Rogers | 7 | 6
(China) Yuan Yue | 5 | 1
WC | (Australia) Kimberly Birrell | 2 | 6 | 7
7 | (Romania) Ana Bogdan | 6 | 2 | 5

Qualifying competition
4 | (United States) Shelby Rogers | 6 | 6
WC | (Australia) Kimberly Birrell | 1 | 2

==== Fifth qualifier ====
First round
5 | (Czech Republic) Kateřina Siniaková | 6 | 7^{7}
Kamilla Rakhimova | 3 | 6^{5}
Alt | (Poland) Magdalena Fręch | 3 | 3
9 | (United States) Claire Liu | 6 | 6

Qualifying competition
5 | (Czech Republic) Kateřina Siniaková | 6 | 3 | 1
9 | (United States) Claire Liu | 0 | 6 | 6

==== Sixth qualifier ====
First round
6 | (Egypt) Mayar Sherif | 6 | 7
WC | (Australia) Lizette Cabrera | 2 | 5
(Spain) Cristina Bucșa | 6^{9} | 4
11 | (Ukraine) Marta Kostyuk | 7^{11} | 6

Qualifying competition
6 | (Egypt) Mayar Sherif | 3 | 1
11 | (Ukraine) Marta Kostyuk | 6 | 6
