= 2022 Adelaide International 1 =

Tennis tournament on the 2022 WTA Tour

- Date: 3–9 January
- Edition: 2nd (ATP); 3rd (WTA)
- Category: ATP Tour 250; WTA 500
- Draw: 28S / 24D (ATP); 30S / 16D (WTA)
- Prize money: $416,800 (ATP) $703,580 (WTA)
- Surface: Hard / outdoor
- Location: Adelaide, Australia
- Venue: Memorial Drive Tennis Centre

Champions

Men's singles
- (France) Gaël Monfils

Women's singles
- (Australia) Ashleigh Barty

Men's doubles
- (India) Rohan Bopanna / (India) Ramkumar Ramanathan

Women's doubles
- (Australia) Ashleigh Barty / (Australia) Storm Sanders
- Adelaide International

The 2022 Adelaide International 1 was a tennis tournament on the 2022 ATP Tour and 2022 WTA Tour. It was a combined ATP Tour 250 and WTA 500 tournament played on outdoor hard courts at the redeveloped Memorial Drive Tennis Centre in Adelaide, South Australia in Australia. This was the third edition of the tournament for the women and the second edition for the men. The tournament took place at the Memorial Drive Tennis Centre from 3–9 January 2022 and was followed a week later by the 2022 Adelaide International 2, a combined ATP Tour 250 and WTA 250 tournament, at the same venue.

Ashleigh Barty and Gaël Monfils were crowned the women's and men's singles champions, respectively. Iga Świątek was the defending champion in women's singles and Andrey Rublev was the defending champion in men's singles from when the men's tournaments were last held in 2020. Neither player defended their title after Świątek lost to Barty in the semifinals, and Rublev did not return to compete. By winning the women's doubles tournament as well, Barty notched a third occasion where she won both the singles and doubles titles at the same tournament.

== Champions ==
=== Men's singles ===
- (France) Gaël Monfils def. (Russia) Karen Khachanov, 6–4, 6–4

=== Women's singles ===
- (Australia) Ashleigh Barty def. (Kazakhstan) Elena Rybakina 6–3, 6–2

=== Men's doubles ===
- (India) Rohan Bopanna / (India) Ramkumar Ramanathan def. (Croatia) Ivan Dodig / (Brazil) Marcelo Melo 7–6^{(8–6)}, 6–1

=== Women's doubles ===
- (Australia) Ashleigh Barty / (Australia) Storm Sanders def. (Croatia) Darija Jurak Schreiber / (Slovenia) Andreja Klepač 6–1, 6–4

== Points and prize money ==
=== Point distribution ===
Event	W	F	SF	QF	Round of 16	Round of 32	Q	Q2	Q1
Men's singles	250	150	90	45	20	0	12	6	0
Men's doubles*	250	150	90	45	20	0	—N/a	—N/a	—N/a
Women's singles	470	305	185	100	55	1	25	13	1
Women's doubles*	470	305	185	100	1	—N/a	—N/a	—N/a	—N/a

_{*per team}

=== Prize money ===
Event	W	F	SF	QF	Round of 16	Round of 32	Q2	Q1
Men's singles	$41,800	$29,900	$21,985	$13,800	$8,890	$5,200	$2,540	$1,320
Men's doubles *	$18,700	$10,570	$6,100	$4,320	$2,540	$1,520	—N/a	—N/a
Women's singles	$108,000	$66,800	$39,000	$18,685	$10,000	$6,750	$5,020	$2,585
Women's doubles *	$36,200	$22,000	$12,500	$6,500	$3,900	—N/a	—N/a	—N/a

_{*per team}

== ATP singles main-draw entrants ==
=== Seeds ===
Country	Player	Rank^{1}	Seed
FRA	Gaël Monfils	21	1
RUS	Karen Khachanov	29	2
CRO	Marin Čilić	30	3
USA	Frances Tiafoe	38	4
HUN	Márton Fucsovics	40	5
USA	Tommy Paul	43	6
SRB	Laslo Djere	52	7
KOR	Kwon Soon-woo	53	8

- ^{1} Rankings are as of 27 December 2021.

=== Other entrants ===
The following players received wildcards into the singles main draw:

- (Australia) Alex Bolt
- (Australia) Thanasi Kokkinakis
- (Australia) Aleksandar Vukic

The following players received entry from the qualifying draw:

- (Argentina) Francisco Cerúndolo
- (Japan) Taro Daniel
- (Belarus) Egor Gerasimov
- (Denmark) Holger Rune

=== Withdrawals ===
Before the tournament

- (France) Ugo Humbert → replaced by (Argentina) Juan Manuel Cerúndolo
- (Serbia) Miomir Kecmanović → replaced by (Sweden) Mikael Ymer
- (United States) Sebastian Korda → replaced by (Brazil) Thiago Monteiro
- (France) Arthur Rinderknech → replaced by (France) Corentin Moutet

== ATP doubles main-draw entrants ==
=== Seeds ===
Country	Player	Country	Player	Rank^{1}	Seed
CRO	Ivan Dodig	BRA	Marcelo Melo	41	1
BEL	Sander Gillé	BEL	Joran Vliegen	56	2
URU	Ariel Behar	ECU	Gonzalo Escobar	80	3
BIH	Tomislav Brkić	MEX	Santiago González	82	4
AUS	Matthew Ebden	AUS	John-Patrick Smith	125	5
ISR	Jonathan Erlich	SWE	André Göransson	128	6
GBR	Lloyd Glasspool	FIN	Harri Heliövaara	142	7
USA	Nathaniel Lammons	USA	Jackson Withrow	176	8

- ^{1} Rankings are as of 27 December 2021.

=== Other entrants ===
The following pairs received wildcards into the doubles main draw:

- (Australia) Alex Bolt / (Australia) Thanasi Kokkinakis
- (Australia) Aleksandar Vukic / (Australia) Edward Winter

=== Withdrawals ===
Before the tournament

- (Bolivia) Boris Arias / (Bolivia) Federico Zeballos → replaced by (Germany) Daniel Altmaier / (Peru) Juan Pablo Varillas
- (Italy) Andrea Arnaboldi / (Italy) Alessandro Giannessi → replaced by (Italy) Gianluca Mager / (Italy) Lorenzo Musetti
- (India) Rohan Bopanna / (France) Édouard Roger-Vasselin → replaced by (India) Rohan Bopanna / (India) Ramkumar Ramanathan
- (France) Benjamin Bonzi / (France) Arthur Rinderknech → replaced by (France) Benjamin Bonzi / (Monaco) Hugo Nys
- (United States) Evan King / (United States) Alex Lawson → replaced by (United States) Alex Lawson / (Czech Republic) Jiří Veselý
- (Denmark) Frederik Nielsen / (Sweden) Mikael Ymer → replaced by (Denmark) Frederik Nielsen / (Philippines) Treat Huey

== WTA singles main-draw entrants ==
=== Seeds ===
Country	Player	Rank^{1}	Seed
AUS	Ashleigh Barty	1	1
BLR	Aryna Sabalenka	2	2
GRE	Maria Sakkari	6	3
ESP	Paula Badosa	8	4
POL	Iga Świątek	9	5
USA	Sofia Kenin	12	6
KAZ	Elena Rybakina	14	7
UKR	Elina Svitolina	15	8

- ^{1} Rankings are as of 27 December 2021.

=== Other entrants ===
The following players received wildcards into the singles main draw:

- (Australia) Priscilla Hon
- (Australia) Storm Sanders

The following players received entry from the qualifying draw:

- (Czech Republic) Marie Bouzková
- (Italy) Lucia Bronzetti
- (Norway) Ulrikke Eikeri
- (Australia) Maddison Inglis
- (Greece) Despina Papamichail
- (Australia) Daria Saville

=== Withdrawals ===
Before the tournament

- (Switzerland) Belinda Bencic → replaced by (Slovenia) Kaja Juvan
- (Tunisia) Ons Jabeur → replaced by (United States) Shelby Rogers
- (Czech Republic) Barbora Krejčíková → replaced by (Australia) Ajla Tomljanović
- (Spain) Garbiñe Muguruza → replaced by (Slovakia) Kristína Kučová
- (Latvia) Jeļena Ostapenko → replaced by (Japan) Misaki Doi
- (Czech Republic) Karolína Plíšková → replaced by (United Kingdom) Heather Watson

== WTA doubles main-draw entrants ==
=== Seeds ===
Country	Player	Country	Player	Rank^{1}	Seed
JPN	Shuko Aoyama	JPN	Ena Shibahara	10	1
CAN	Gabriela Dabrowski	MEX	Giuliana Olmos	25	2
CRO	Darija Jurak Schreiber	SLO	Andreja Klepač	29	3
USA	Coco Gauff	USA	Caty McNally	40	4

- ^{1} Rankings are as of 27 December 2021.

=== Other entrants ===
The following pair received a wildcard into the doubles main draw:

- (Australia) Priscilla Hon / (Australia) Charlotte Kempenaers-Pocz

=== Withdrawals ===
Before the tournament

- (Chile) Alexa Guarachi / (United States) Nicole Melichar-Martinez → replaced by (United States) Sofia Kenin / (United States) Nicole Melichar-Martinez
- (Ukraine) Lyudmyla Kichenok / (Latvia) Jeļena Ostapenko → replaced by (Ukraine) Kateryna Bondarenko / (Ukraine) Lyudmyla Kichenok
- (United States) Desirae Krawczyk / (United States) Bethanie Mattek-Sands → replaced by (Australia) Ashleigh Barty / (Australia) Storm Sanders

During the tournament

- (Belarus) Victoria Azarenka / (Spain) Paula Badosa (right leg injury – Azarenka)
- (Canada) Leylah Fernandez / (New Zealand) Erin Routliffe (lower back injury – Fernandez)

=== Retirements ===
- (Czech Republic) Marie Bouzková / (Czech Republic) Lucie Hradecká

== See also ==
- South Australian Championships
- Australian Hard Court Championships
- Australian Open Series
