= 2022 Adelaide International 2 =

- Date: 10–15 January 2022
- Category: ATP 250; WTA 250
- Draw: 32S/32Q/16D
- Prize money: $493,875 (ATP) $239,477 (WTA)
- Surface: Hard / Outdoor
- Location: Adelaide, Australia
- Venue: Memorial Drive Tennis Centre

Champions

Men's singles
- (Australia) Thanasi Kokkinakis

Women's singles
- (United States) Madison Keys

Men's doubles
- (Netherlands) Wesley Koolhof / (United Kingdom) Neal Skupski

Women's doubles
- (Japan) Eri Hozumi / (Japan) Makoto Ninomiya
- Adelaide International

The 2022 Adelaide International 2 was a tennis tournament on the 2022 ATP Tour and 2022 WTA Tour. It was a combined ATP Tour 250 and WTA 250 tournament played on outdoor hard courts at the Memorial Drive Tennis Centre in Adelaide, South Australia, Australia. This was the fourth edition of the tournament for the women and the third edition for the men.

It was organized due to the cancellation of the Hobart International for the women and ATP Auckland Open for the men, because of the ongoing COVID-19 pandemic. The tournament took place from 10 to 15 January 2022 and followed the 2022 Adelaide International 1, a combined ATP Tour 250 and WTA 500 tournament, held the week before.

== Champions ==
=== Men's singles ===
- (Australia) Thanasi Kokkinakis def. (France) Arthur Rinderknech 6–7^{(6–8)}, 7–6^{(7–5)}, 6–3

=== Women's singles ===
- (United States) Madison Keys def. (United States) Alison Riske 6–1, 6–2

=== Men's doubles ===
- (Netherlands) Wesley Koolhof / (United Kingdom) Neal Skupski def. (Uruguay) Ariel Behar / (Ecuador) Gonzalo Escobar, 7–6^{(7–5)}, 6–4

=== Women's doubles ===
- (Japan) Eri Hozumi / (Japan) Makoto Ninomiya def. (Czech Republic) Tereza Martincová / (Czech Republic) Markéta Vondroušová 1–6, 7–6^{(7–4)}, [10–7]

== Points and prize money ==
=== Point distribution ===
Event	W	F	SF	QF	Round of 16	Round of 32	Q	Q2	Q1
Men's singles	250	150	90	45	20	0	12	6	0
Men's doubles*	250	150	90	45	20	0	—N/a	—N/a	—N/a
Women's singles	280	180	110	60	30	1	18	12	1
Women's doubles*	280	180	110	60	1	—N/a	—N/a	—N/a	—N/a

_{*per team}

=== Prize money ===
Event	W	F	SF	QF	Round of 16	Round of 32	Q2	Q1
Men's singles	$43,189	$30,885	$22,710	$14,255	$9,180	$5,370	$2,625	$1,365
Men's doubles *	$19,300	$10,900	$6,300	$3,570	$2,100	$1,260	—N/a	—N/a
Women's singles	$31,000	$18,037	$10,100	$5,800	$3,675	$2,675	$1,950	$1,270
Women's doubles*	$10,800	$6,300	$3,800	$2,300	$1,750	—N/a	—N/a	—N/a

== ATP singles main-draw entrants ==
=== Seeds ===
Country	Player	Rank^{1}	Seed
FRA	Gaël Monfils	21	1
USA	John Isner	24	2
RUS	Karen Khachanov	29	3
CRO	Marin Čilić	30	4
RSA	Lloyd Harris	31	5
KAZ	Alexander Bublik	36	6
USA	Frances Tiafoe	38	7
HUN	Márton Fucsovics	40	8

- ^{1} Rankings are as of 3 January 2022.

=== Other entrants ===
The following players received wildcards into the singles main draw:

- (Australia) Alex Bolt
- (Australia) Thanasi Kokkinakis
- (Australia) Aleksandar Vukic

The following players received entry from the qualifying draw:

- (Belarus) Egor Gerasimov
- (United States) Steve Johnson
- (France) Corentin Moutet
- (Japan) Yoshihito Nishioka

The following players received entry as lucky losers:

- (Spain) Roberto Carballés Baena
- (Brazil) Thiago Monteiro

=== Withdrawals ===
Before the tournament

- (United States) Jenson Brooksby → replaced by (France) Arthur Rinderknech
- (Serbia) Laslo Đere → replaced by (Brazil) Thiago Monteiro
- (Australia) James Duckworth → replaced by (Spain) Jaume Munar
- (Germany) Dominik Koepfer → replaced by (Spain) Roberto Carballés Baena
- (United States) Sebastian Korda → replaced by (Italy) Gianluca Mager

== ATP doubles main-draw entrants ==
=== Seeds ===
Country	Player	Country	Player	Rank^{1}	Seed
USA	Rajeev Ram	GBR	Joe Salisbury	7	1
CRO	Ivan Dodig	BRA	Marcelo Melo	41	2
NED	Wesley Koolhof	GBR	Neal Skupski	41	3
BEL	Sander Gillé	BEL	Joran Vliegen	56	4
RSA	Raven Klaasen	JPN	Ben McLachlan	63	5
URU	Ariel Behar	ECU	Gonzalo Escobar	80	6
MEX	Santiago González	ARG	Andrés Molteni	81	7
BIH	Tomislav Brkić	SRB	Nikola Ćaćić	83	8

- ^{1} Rankings are as of 3 January 2022.

=== Other entrants ===
The following pairs received wildcards into the doubles main draw:

- (Australia) Aaron Addison / (Australia) Thomas Fancutt
- (Australia) Harry Bourchier / (Australia) Brandon Walkin

The following pair received entry as alternates:

- (Australia) Calum Puttergill / (Australia) Adam Taylor

=== Withdrawals ===
Before the tournament

- (Monaco) Romain Arneodo / (France) Benoît Paire → replaced by (Germany) Oscar Otte / (France) Benoît Paire
- (Hungary) Márton Fucsovics / (United States) Tommy Paul → replaced by (Australia) Calum Puttergill / (Australia) Adam Taylor
- (Netherlands) Tallon Griekspoor / (Italy) Andrea Vavassori → replaced by (Philippines) Treat Huey / (Denmark) Frederik Nielsen
- (France) Nicolas Mahut / (France) Fabrice Martin → replaced by (United States) Evan King / (United States) Alex Lawson
- (United States) Frances Tiafoe / (United States) Nicholas Monroe → replaced by (United States) Nicholas Monroe / (Denmark) Holger Rune

== WTA singles main-draw entrants ==
=== Seeds ===
Country	Player	Rank^{1}	Seed
BLR	Aryna Sabalenka	2	1
UKR	Elina Svitolina	15	2
USA	Coco Gauff	22	3
SLO	Tamara Zidanšek	30	4
~~RUS~~	~~Veronika Kudermetova~~	~~31~~	~~5~~
CZE	Markéta Vondroušová	35	6
SUI	Jil Teichmann	37	7
RUS	Liudmila Samsonova	38	8
ROU	Sorana Cîrstea	39	9

- ^{1} Rankings are as of 3 January 2022.

=== Other entrants ===
The following players received wildcards into the singles main draw:

- (Australia) Maddison Inglis
- (Belarus) Aryna Sabalenka
- (Australia) Daria Saville

The following player received entry as an alternate:

- (Croatia) Ana Konjuh

The following players received entry from the qualifying draw:

- (United States) Lauren Davis
- (Sweden) Rebecca Peterson
- (Russia) Anastasia Potapova
- (Ukraine) Dayana Yastremska
- (United Kingdom) Heather Watson
- (Australia) Storm Sanders

The following player received entry as a lucky loser:

- (Montenegro) Danka Kovinić

=== Withdrawals ===
Before the tournament

- (Italy) Camila Giorgi → replaced by (United States) Madison Brengle
- (Russia) Veronika Kudermetova → replaced by (Montenegro) Danka Kovinić
- (United States) Ann Li → replaced by (Croatia) Ana Konjuh
- (Kazakhstan) Yulia Putintseva → replaced by (United States) Madison Keys
- (Spain) Sara Sorribes Tormo → replaced by (Egypt) Mayar Sherif
- (Denmark) Clara Tauson → replaced by (France) Alizé Cornet

== WTA doubles main-draw entrants ==
=== Seeds ===
Country	Player	Country	Player	Rank^{1}	Seed
~~CZE~~	~~Marie Bouzková~~	~~CZE~~	~~Lucie Hradecká~~	~~63~~	~~1~~
UKR	Nadiia Kichenok	IND	Sania Mirza	94	2
JPN	Eri Hozumi	JPN	Makoto Ninomiya	114	3
JPN	Miyu Kato	USA	Sabrina Santamaria	138	4

- ^{1} Rankings are as of 3 January 2022.

=== Other entrants ===
The following pairs received wildcards into the doubles main draw:

- (Australia) Maddison Inglis / (Australia) Olivia Tjandramulia
- (Australia) Annerly Poulos / (Australia) Tina Nadine Smith

The following pair received entry as an alternate:

- (Slovakia) Kristína Kučová / (United Kingdom) Tara Moore

=== Withdrawals ===
Before the tournament

- (Czech Republic) Marie Bouzková / (Czech Republic) Lucie Hradecká → replaced by (Slovakia) Kristína Kučová / (United Kingdom) Tara Moore
- (Chinese Taipei) Chan Hao-ching / (Romania) Monica Niculescu → replaced by (Thailand) Peangtarn Plipuech / (Indonesia) Aldila Sutjiadi
- (Poland) Katarzyna Piter / (Czech Republic) Renata Voráčová → replaced by (Ukraine) Marta Kostyuk / (Poland) Katarzyna Piter

== See also ==
- South Australian Championships
- Australian Hard Court Championships
- Australian Open Series
