= Brandon Walkin =

Australian tennis player

- Country (sports): Australia (–2024); United Kingdom (2024–present)
- Born: 16 August 1994 (age 32) Brisbane, Australia
- Height: 1.88 m (6 ft 2 in)
- Plays: Right-handed (two-handed backhand)
- Coach: Rhan Burton
- Prize money: US $66,943

Singles
- Career record: 0–0 (at ATP Tour level, Grand Slam level, and in Davis Cup)
- Career titles: 0
- Highest ranking: No. 702 (17 February 2020)
- Current ranking: No. 1,972 (15 June 2026)

Doubles
- Career record: 0–1 (at ATP Tour level, Grand Slam level, and in Davis Cup)
- Career titles: 17 ITF
- Highest ranking: No. 204 (19 June 2023)
- Current ranking: No. 985 (15 June 2026)
- Last updated on: 18 June 2026.

Brandon Walkin (born 16 August 1994) is an Australian-born British tennis player. Walkin has a career high ATP doubles ranking of No. 204 achieved on 19 June 2023 and a career high singles ranking of No. 702 achieved on 17 February 2020.

Walkin made his ATP main draw debut at the 2022 Adelaide International 2 after receiving a wildcard into the doubles main draw with Harry Bourchier.

== Career ==
=== 2013–2017: Career beginnings on ITF and Challenger Tour ===
Walkin made his ITF debut in March 2013 at the Australia F4, where he made the second round. It was his only singles tournament of the year.

In 2014 and 2015 Walkin played on the ITF in Australia and Europe, with the second round being his best performance in singles and semi-finals in doubles.

In September 2016 Walkin reached the quarter-final of the Australia F5.

In October 2016 Walkin debuted on the ATP Challenger Tour after he qualified for Traralgon ATP Challenger.

In February 2017 Walkin reached his first ITF finals in doubles in Anning, China. Walkin also won his first ITF title in Anning, partnered with Thomas Fancutt. Walkin played his last match on the ITF circuit in April 2017 for almost two years.

=== 2019–2021 ===
In February 2019 following a two-year injury lay off, Walkin played his first match on the ITF circuit since April 2017 and throughout 2019, made 8 ITF doubles finals. In May 2019, Walkin reached his first singles ITF final in M15 Cancun, which saw him re enter the ATP top 1000 rankings. Walkin returned to Australia and played several ITF and challenger events, finishing 2019 with a singles ranking of 782 and a doubles rank of 334. Walkin also competed in the Australian Open Wildcard Playoffs in 2019 losing to eventual winner J.P Smith

Walkin started 2020 playing in the North American ITF Circuit, achieving a semi-final run at Cancun, Mexico, before the COVID-19 pandemic stopped play in March 2020.

=== 2022: ATP debut ===
Walkin began 2022 at the 2022 Traralgon International following yet another injury lay off. He reached the second round. Walkin made his ATP Tour debut at the 2022 Adelaide International 2, playing doubles alongside Harry Bourchier. Walkin also competed in the singles qualifying event.

== ITF Circuit finals ==
=== Singles: 2 (0 title) ===
Legend $25,000 tournaments (0–1) $15,000 tournaments (0–1)	Finals by surface Hard (0–2) Clay (0–0) Grass (0–0) Carpet (0–0)

Result	W–L	Date	Level	Tournament	Surface	Opponent	Score
Loss	0–1	Jun 2019	M15	Cancún, Mexico	Hard	(United States) Jordi Arconada	5–7, 4–6
Loss	0–2	Apr 2023	M25	Jakarta, Indonesia	Hard	(Turkey) Yankı Erel	3–6, 0–6

=== Doubles: 29 (17 titles) ===
Legend $25,000 tournaments (12–3) $15,000 tournaments (5–9)	Finals by surface Hard (8–8) Clay (8–4) Grass (1–0) Carpet (0–0)

Result	W–L	Date	Level	Tournament	Surface	Partner	Opponents	Score
Loss	0–1	Feb 2017	M15	Anning, China	Hard	(Australia) Thomas Fancutt	(Italy) Marco Bortolotti (Croatia) Nino Serdarušić	6–7, 6–3, [8–10]
Winner	1–1	Mar 2017	M15	Anning, China	Hard	(Australia) Thomas Fancutt	(China) Bai Yan (China) Zhao Cai	6–4, 6–4
Winner	2–1	Mar 2019	M25	Mildura, Australia	Grass	(Australia) Calum Puttergill	(United Kingdom) Brydan Klein (Australia) Scott Puodziunas	7–6, 6–7 [18–16]
Winner	3–1	Mar 2019	M25	Mornington, Australia	Clay	(Australia) Calum Puttergill	(Australia) Thomas Fancutt (Australia) Dane Sweeny	6–1, 7–5
Winner	4–1	Mar 2019	M25	Mornington, Australia	Clay	(Australia) Calum Puttergill	(Australia) Aaron Addison (India) Karunuday Singh	1–6 6–3 [10–8]
Winner	5–1	May 2019	M15	Cancún, Mexico	Hard	(Australia) Matthew Christopher Romios	(United States) Alexios Halebian (United States) Paul Oosterbaan	6–2, 2–6, [10–8]
Loss	5–2	Jul 2019	M15	Cancún, Mexico	Hard	(United States) Felix Corwin	(France) Jaimee Floyd Angele (France) Ronan Joncour	6–3, 3–6, [8–10]
Loss	5–3	Jul 2019	M15	Cancún, Mexico	Hard	(United States) Tyler Mercier	(United States) Joshua Ortlip (Brazil) Breno Souza Plentz	6–3, 6–7, [5–10]
Loss	5–4	Aug 2019	M15	Cancún, Mexico	Hard	(United Kingdom) Isaac Stoute	(Japan) Shintaro Mochizuki (Argentina) Thiago Agustin Tirante	6–7, 7–5, [4–10]
Winner	6–4	Sep 2019	M25	Cairns, Australia	Hard	(Australia) Calum Puttergill	(Ukraine) Vladyslav Orlov (New Zealand) Rhett Purcell	6–4, 5–7, [10–5]
Loss	6–5	Feb 2020	M15	Cancún, Mexico	Hard	(France) Gabriel Petit	(Republic of Ireland) Simon Carr (New Zealand) Ajeet Rai	4–6, 2–6
Winner	7–5	Feb 2020	M15	Cancún, Mexico	Hard	(Brazil) Igor Marcondes	(Argentina) Francisco Comesaña (Argentina) Alejo Lorenzo Lingua Lavallén	6–3, 6–4
Loss	7–6	Dec 2021	M15	Cancún, Mexico	Hard	(France) Constantin Bittoun Kouzmine	(Peru) Arklon Huertas del Pino (Peru) Conner Huertas del Pino	4–6, 4–6
Win	8–6	Feb 2022	M25	Bendigo, Australia	Hard	(Australia) Calum Puttergill	(Australia) Blake Ellis (Australia) Tristan Schoolkate	6–2, 6–3
Loss	8–7	May 2022	M15	Antalya, Turkey	Clay	(Australia) Matthew Christopher Romios	Vladimir Korolev; Maxim Ratniuk	6–7^{(3–7)}, 6–4, [5–10]
Win	9–7	Jun 2022	M25	Kiseljak, Bosnia and Herzegovina	Clay	(Australia) Matthew Christopher Romios	(Italy) Mattia Bellucci (Switzerland) Rémy Bertola	3–6, 6–4, [10–6]
Loss	9–8	Jun 2022	M15	Bytom, Poland	Clay	(Australia) Matthew Christopher Romios	(Czech Republic) Jakub Mensik (Poland) Olaf Pieczkowski	6–7^{(3–7)}, 5–7
Win	10–8	Jul 2022	M15	Velenje, Slovenia	Clay	(France) Constantin Bittoun Kouzmine	(Czech Republic) Jiri Barnat (Czech Republic) Filip Duda	6–1, 6-2
Win	11–8	Aug 2022	M25	Padua, Italy	Clay	(Australia) Jason Taylor	(Croatia) Duje Ajdukovic (Croatia) Frane Nincevic	7–6^{(7–3)}, 6-0
Win	12–8	Aug 2022	M25	Poznań, Poland	Clay	(Australia) Jason Taylor	(Poland) Michal Dembek (Ukraine) Georgii Kravchenko	7–5, 7–5
Loss	12–9	Oct 2022	M25	Rodez, France	Hard	(Croatia) Zvonimir Babić	(Netherlands) Mats Hermans (Netherlands) Mick Veldheer	3–6, 4–6
Win	13–9	Oct 2022	M25	Jakarta, Indonesia	Hard	(Australia) Thomas Fancutt	(China) Sun Fajing (Japan) Seita Watanabe	4–6, 6–3, [10–6]
Loss	13–10	Mar 2023	M25	Canberra, Australia	Clay	(Australia) Matthew Christopher Romios	(Japan) Taisei Ichikawa (Japan) Daisuke Sumizawa	6–7^{(6–8)}, 7–5, [3–10]
Win	14–10	Apr 2023	M25	Jakarta, Indonesia	Hard	(Australia) Matthew Christopher Romios	(Chinese Taipei) Ray Ho (India) Parikshit Somani	7–5, 6–4
Win	15–10	May 2023	M15	Brčko, Bosnia and Herzegovina	Clay	(United States) George Goldhoff	(Slovakia) Lukáš Pokorný (Austria) David Pichler	7–6^{(7–4)}, 6–3
Win	16–10	Jun 2023	M25	Kiseljak, Bosnia and Herzegovina	Clay	(Australia) Matthew Christopher Romios	(Serbia) Stefan Latinović (Serbia) Andrej Radojicic	6–2, 6–3
Loss	16–11	Jun 2023	M15	Sarajevo, Bosnia and Herzegovina	Clay	(Australia) Matthew Christopher Romios	(Argentina) Juan Bautista Otegui (Argentina) Matias Zukas	6–7^{(0–7)}, 3–6
Loss	16–12	Sep 2023	M25	Darwin, Australia	Hard	(Australia) Blake Bayldon	(Australia) Thomas Fancutt (New Zealand) Ajeet Rai	1–6, 4–6
Win	17–12	Nov 2024	M25	Brisbane, Australia	Hard	(Northern Mariana Islands) Colin Sinclair	(Australia) Joshua Charlton (United Kingdom) Emile Hudd	7–6^{(7–3)}, 6–3
