= Aaron Addison =

Australian tennis player

- Country (sports): Australia
- Born: 12 November 1995 (age 30) Melbourne, Australia
- Height: 1.93 m (6 ft 4 in)
- Prize money: $47,390

Singles
- Career record: 0–0 (at ATP Tour level, Grand Slam level, and in Davis Cup)
- Career titles: 0
- Highest ranking: No. 745 (8 August 2022)

Doubles
- Career record: 2–1 (at ATP Tour level, Grand Slam level, and in Davis Cup)
- Career titles: 5 ITF
- Highest ranking: No. 365 (24 October 2022)

Aaron Addison (born 12 November 1995) is an Australian tennis player.

Addison has a career high ATP singles ranking of No. 745 achieved on 8 August 2022 and a career high ATP doubles ranking of No. 365 achieved on 24 October 2022.

Addison made his ATP main draw debut at the 2022 Adelaide International 2 after receiving a wildcard into the doubles main draw with Thomas Fancutt.

== Career ==
=== 2012-2021: ITF debut ===
Addison made ITF debut playing doubles in October 2012 at the Australia F12.

Addison made ITF singles debut in September 2014 at the Australia F6.

In February 2017, Addison won his first ITF doubles title at the Indonesia F1.

=== 2022: ATP debut ===
Addison made his ATP main draw debut at the 2022 Adelaide International 2 after receiving a wildcard into the doubles main draw with Thomas Fancutt. They reached the quarter-final of this event. He reached the semi-final of the M25 Canberra in February, which is his best singles result at this level.

== ATP Challenger and ITF Futures/World Tennis Tour finals ==
=== Doubles: 8 (5–3) ===
| Legend ATP Challengers (0–0) ITF Futures/World Tennis Tour (5–3) | Titles by surface Hard (5–2) Clay (0–1) Grass (0–0) |

| Result | W–L | Date | Tournament | Tier | Surface | Partner | Opponents | Score |
|---|---|---|---|---|---|---|---|---|
| Win | 1–0 | Feb 2017 | Indonesia F1, Jakarta | Futures | Hard | (New Zealand) Rhett Purcell | (India) Karunuday Singh (Canada) Kelsey Stevenson | Walkover |
| Loss | 1–1 | Mar 2019 | M15 Mornington, Australia | World Tennis Tour | Clay | (India) Karunuday Singh | (Australia) Calum Puttergill (Australia) Brandon Walkin | 6–1, 3–6, [8–10] |
| Win | 2–1 | Jun 2019 | M15 Singapore, Singapore | World Tennis Tour | Hard | (Australia) Cameron Green | (Thailand) Congsup Congcar (Japan) Kazuki Nishiwaki | 6–4, 6–4 |
| Win | 3–1 | May 2022 | M15 Heraklion, Greece | World Tennis Tour | Hard | (Canada) Kelsey Stevenson | (Bulgaria) Gabriel Donev (Bulgaria) Simon Anthony Ivanov | 7–6^{(7–3)}, 7–6^{(7–4)} |
| Win | 4–1 | May 2022 | M25 Netanya, Israel | World Tennis Tour | Hard | (Australia) Calum Puttergill | (United Kingdom) Giles Hussey (United Kingdom) Daniel Little | 6–3, 3–6, [10–7] |
| Loss | 4–2 | Jul 2022 | M15 Caloundra, Australia | World Tennis Tour | Hard | (Australia) Matthew Romios | (Australia) Jeremy Beale (Australia) Thomas Fancutt | 6–7^{(1–7)}, 3–6 |
| Win | 5–2 | Jul 2022 | M15 Caloundra, Australia | World Tennis Tour | Hard | (Australia) Matthew Romios | (Australia) Blake Bayldon (Australia) Jordan Smith | 6–4, 3–6, [10–5] |
| Loss | 5–3 | Oct 2022 | M25 Cairns, Australia | World Tennis Tour | Hard | (Australia) Calum Puttergill | (Australia) Blake Ellis (Australia) Tristan Schoolkate | 4–6, 1–6 |
