= 2023 Elena Rybakina tennis season =

Tennis season statistics

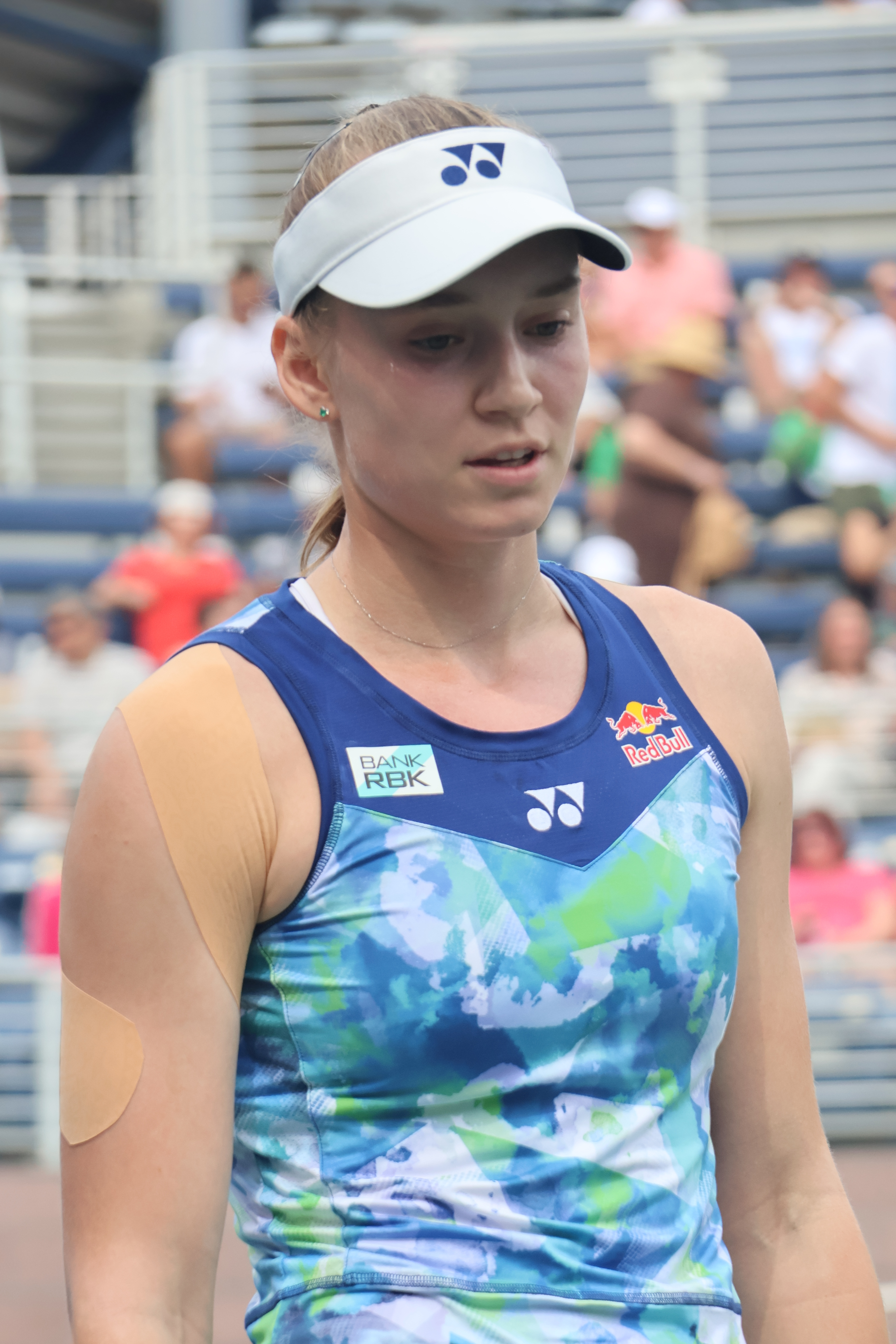
- Rybakina at the 2023 US Open
- Full name: Elena Rybakina
- Country: Kazakhstan
- Calendar prize money: $5,493,437

Singles
- Season record: 47–15
- Calendar titles: 2
- Year-end ranking: No. 4
- Ranking change from previous year: ▲18

Grand Slam & significant results
- Australian Open: F
- French Open: 3R
- Wimbledon: QF
- US Open: 3R

Doubles
- Season record: 7–3
- Current ranking: No. 119
- Ranking change from previous year: ▲323

Grand Slam doubles results
- Australian Open: 3R
- French Open: A
- Wimbledon: A
- US Open: A
- Last updated on: 7 March 2024.

The 2023 Elena Rybakina tennis season officially began on 1 January 2023, with the start of the Adelaide International 1 in Adelaide.

During this season, Rybakina:

- Reached the finals of Australian Open, becoming the first Kazakhstani to do so.
- Became the first Kazakhstani player, male or female, to enter top 10 in Rankings .
- Claimed a career best winning streak of 13 matches.
- Won her first WTA 1000 title at the Indian Wells Open, becoming the first Kazakhstani player to do so. She also reached the finals of Miami Open.
- Won the Italian Open. She was the first player since 2017 to win Italian Open and Indian Wells Open in the same year. She was the only player in 2023 to win multiple WTA 1000 titles.
- Reached her highest career ranking of World No.3 on 12 June.
- Finished the year with winning percentage of over 75%.

== Yearly Summary ==
Rybakina started the season at the Adelaide International 1, defeating Danielle Collins in three sets, before losing to Marta Kostyuk in the second round. She followed it with a first round loss at the Adelaide International 2 to Petra Kvitová in straight sets. However, she reached the doubles final with partner Anastasia Pavlyuchenkova. At the Australian Open, Rybakina defeated 2022 finalist Danielle Collins again in the third round, followed by world No. 1 Iga Świątek in the fourth round becoming the first Kazakhstani woman to reach the quarterfinals at this Major. Next she defeated former French Open champion Jeļena Ostapenko to reach her first Australian Open semifinal. In the semifinals, she defeated former world No. 1 and two-time Australian Open champion, Victoria Azarenka, in straight sets, reaching the second Grand Slam final of her career. However, despite winning the first set, Rybakina ultimately lost in the championship match to Aryna Sabalenka in a high quality encounter. She reached the top 10 on 30 January 2023 making her the first player representing Kazakhstan, male or female, ever to reach the Top 10 on either the ATP or WTA rankings.

In Abu Dhabi she reached the quarterfinals defeating Karolina Plíšková, where she lost to Beatriz Haddad Maia. In Dubai, she reached the third round by beating Bianca Andreescu and Marie Bouzková in straight sets. She withdrew from her third round match against fifth seed Coco Gauff due to a lower-back injury. At Indian Wells, as the tenth seed, she made her second consecutive Indian Wells quarterfinal after defeating Sofia Kenin, 21st seed Paula Badosa and Varvara Gracheva. Then she defeated Karolína Muchová to reach her first WTA 1000 semifinal. In the semifinals, she moved past the defending champion Świątek, in straight sets, for the second time in 2023 to reach her first WTA 1000 final. In the final, she edged second seed Aryna Sabalenka in straight sets, reversing the result of their matchup in the Australian Open final for her first WTA 1000 title. This result pushed her ranking to a new career-high of world No. 7 in the WTA singles rankings.

Rybakina reached the final of the Miami Open, where she lost to 15th seed Petra Kvitová, preventing her from completing the Sunshine Double. She then recorded early second round exits at the Stuttgart Open and the Madrid Open to Beatriz Haddad Maia and Anna Kalinskaya, respectively, and reached a new career-high of world No. 6 on 8 May 2023. She then reached the quarterfinals at the Italian Open and moved to a new career high ranking of world No. 5 with a win over Jasmine Paolini, Anna Kalinskaya by retirement and Markéta Vondroušová. Next she defeated world No. 1, Iga Świątek (who retired during the deciding set due to injury) for the third time to reach her first Rome semifinal. Rybakina reached her third WTA 1000 final of the season defeating Jeļena Ostapenko. She became the third player in the Open Era to reach the final in the same season at the Australian Open, Indian Wells and Miami Open plus Rome, after Monica Seles in 1991 and Maria Sharapova in 2012. She won her first WTA 1000 clay title, after Anhelina Kalinina retired in the second set, and moved to a career-high ranking of world No. 4, on 22 May 2023. At the 2023 French Open, despite her walkover due to respiratory illness in the third round, she reached No. 3 in the world rankings on 12 June 2023. On 26 June 2023, Rybakina announced her withdrawal from the Eastbourne International tournament with a viral illness.

At Wimbledon as defending champion, Rybakina reached the quarterfinals where she lost to Ons Jabeur in three sets.

Following her quarterfinal loss at Wimbledon, she reached the semifinals at the Canadian Open for the first time in her career. She overcame Jennifer Brady and Sloane Stephens before defeating Daria Kasatkina in a match that lasted 3 hours and 27 minutes, the longest match of Rybakina's career. The match finished at 2:55am local time. In the semifinals Rybakina lost to Liudmila Samsonova in three sets reporting that she felt 'destroyed' physically in the post match press conference because of the scheduling issues she faced during the tournament.

She reached the third round of the US Open as the fourth seed, losing to Sorana Cîrstea in three sets.

== All matches ==
This table chronicles all the matches of Elena Rybakina in 2023.

Key
W	F	SF	QF	#R	RR	Q#	P#	DNQ	A	Z#	PO	G	S	B	NMS	NTI	P	NH

(W) winner; (F) finalist; (SF) semifinalist; (QF) quarterfinalist; (#R) rounds 4, 3, 2, 1; (RR) round-robin stage; (Q#) qualification round; (P#) preliminary round; (DNQ) did not qualify; (A) absent; (Z#) Davis/Fed Cup Zonal Group (with number indication) or (PO) play-off; (G) gold, (S) silver or (B) bronze Olympic/Paralympic medal; (NMS) not a Masters tournament; (NTI) not a Tier I tournament; (P) postponed; (NH) not held; (SR) strike rate (events won / competed); (W–L) win–loss record.
To avoid confusion and double counting, these charts are updated at the conclusion of a tournament or when the player's participation has ended.

=== Singles matches ===
Tournament	Match	Round	Opponent	Rank	Result	Score
Adelaide International 1; Adelaide, Australia; WTA 500; Hard, outdoor; 1 January 2023 – 8 January 2023	1	1R	(United States) Danielle Collins (5)	14	Win	5–7, 6–2, 6–3
Adelaide International 1; Adelaide, Australia; WTA 500; Hard, outdoor; 1 January 2023 – 8 January 2023	2	2R	(Ukraine) Marta Kostyuk (Q)	69	Loss	7–6^{(7–5)}, 2–6, 3–6
Adelaide International 2; Adelaide, Australia; WTA 500; Hard, outdoor; 9 January 2023 – 15 January 2023	3	1R	(Czech Republic) Petra Kvitová (12)	16	Loss	3–6, 5–7
Australian Open; Melbourne, Australia; Grand Slam; Hard, outdoor; 16 January 2023 – 29 January 2023
Australian Open; Melbourne, Australia; Grand Slam; Hard, outdoor; 16 January 2023 – 29 January 2023	4	1R	(Italy) Elisabetta Cocciaretto	48	Win	7–5, 6–3
Australian Open; Melbourne, Australia; Grand Slam; Hard, outdoor; 16 January 2023 – 29 January 2023	5	2R	(Slovenia) Kaja Juvan	104	Win	6–2, 6–1
Australian Open; Melbourne, Australia; Grand Slam; Hard, outdoor; 16 January 2023 – 29 January 2023	6	3R	(United States) Danielle Collins (13)	11	Win	6–2, 5–7, 6–2
Australian Open; Melbourne, Australia; Grand Slam; Hard, outdoor; 16 January 2023 – 29 January 2023	7	4R	(Poland) Iga Świątek (1)	1	Win	6–4, 6–4
Australian Open; Melbourne, Australia; Grand Slam; Hard, outdoor; 16 January 2023 – 29 January 2023	8	QF	(Latvia) Jeļena Ostapenko (17)	17	Win	6–2, 6–4
Australian Open; Melbourne, Australia; Grand Slam; Hard, outdoor; 16 January 2023 – 29 January 2023	9	SF	Victoria Azarenka (Note: Russian and Belarus players are not allowed to compete under the name or flag of their country following the Russian invasion of Ukraine.) (24)	24	Win	7–6^{(7–4)}, 6–3
Australian Open; Melbourne, Australia; Grand Slam; Hard, outdoor; 16 January 2023 – 29 January 2023	10	F	Aryna Sabalenka (5)	5	Loss	6–4, 3–6, 4–6
Abu Dhabi Open; Abu Dhabi, UAE; WTA 500; Hard; 6 February 2023–12 February 2023	–	1R	Bye			
Abu Dhabi Open; Abu Dhabi, UAE; WTA 500; Hard; 6 February 2023–12 February 2023	11	2R	(Czech Republic) Karolína Plíšková	20	Win	6–4, 6–2
Abu Dhabi Open; Abu Dhabi, UAE; WTA 500; Hard; 6 February 2023–12 February 2023	12	QF	(Brazil) Beatriz Haddad Maia (6)	14	Loss	6–3, 3–6, 2–6
Dubai Tennis Championships; Dubai, United Arab Emirates; WTA 1000; Hard, outdoor; 20 February 2023 – 26 February 2023	13	1R	(Canada) Bianca Andreescu	36	Win	6–3, 6–4
Dubai Tennis Championships; Dubai, United Arab Emirates; WTA 1000; Hard, outdoor; 20 February 2023 – 26 February 2023	14	2R	(Czech Republic) Marie Bouzková	26	Win	7–5, 6–2
Dubai Tennis Championships; Dubai, United Arab Emirates; WTA 1000; Hard, outdoor; 20 February 2023 – 26 February 2023	–	3R	(United States) Coco Gauff (5)	6	Withdrew	—N/a
Indian Wells Open; Indian Wells, United States; WTA 1000; Hard, outdoor; 6 March 2023 – 19 March 2023	–	1R	Bye			
Indian Wells Open; Indian Wells, United States; WTA 1000; Hard, outdoor; 6 March 2023 – 19 March 2023	15	2R	(United States) Sofia Kenin (WC)	170	Win	7–6^{(8–6)}, 7–6^{(7–5)}
Indian Wells Open; Indian Wells, United States; WTA 1000; Hard, outdoor; 6 March 2023 – 19 March 2023	16	3R	(Spain) Paula Badosa (21)	22	Win	6–3, 7–5
Indian Wells Open; Indian Wells, United States; WTA 1000; Hard, outdoor; 6 March 2023 – 19 March 2023	17	4R	(France) Varvara Gracheva (Q)	66	Win	6–3, 6–0
Indian Wells Open; Indian Wells, United States; WTA 1000; Hard, outdoor; 6 March 2023 – 19 March 2023	18	QF	(Czech Republic) Karolína Muchová (PR)	76	Win	7–6^{(7–4)}, 2–6, 6–4
Indian Wells Open; Indian Wells, United States; WTA 1000; Hard, outdoor; 6 March 2023 – 19 March 2023	19	SF	(Poland) Iga Świątek (1)	1	Win	6–2, 6–2
Indian Wells Open; Indian Wells, United States; WTA 1000; Hard, outdoor; 6 March 2023 – 19 March 2023	20	W	Aryna Sabalenka (2)	2	Win (1)	7–6^{(13–11)}, 2–6, 6–4
Miami Open; Miami Gardens, United States; WTA 1000; Hard, outdoor; 21 March 2023 – 2 April 2023	–	1R	Bye			
Miami Open; Miami Gardens, United States; WTA 1000; Hard, outdoor; 21 March 2023 – 2 April 2023	21	2R	Anna Kalinskaya	64	Win	7–5, 4–6, 6–3
Miami Open; Miami Gardens, United States; WTA 1000; Hard, outdoor; 21 March 2023 – 2 April 2023	22	3R	(Spain) Paula Badosa (22)	29	Win	3–6, 7–5, 6–3
Miami Open; Miami Gardens, United States; WTA 1000; Hard, outdoor; 21 March 2023 – 2 April 2023	23	4R	(Belgium) Elise Mertens	39	Win	6–4, 6–3
Miami Open; Miami Gardens, United States; WTA 1000; Hard, outdoor; 21 March 2023 – 2 April 2023	24	QF	(Italy) Martina Trevisan (25)	24	Win	6–3, 6–0
Miami Open; Miami Gardens, United States; WTA 1000; Hard, outdoor; 21 March 2023 – 2 April 2023	25	SF	(United States) Jessica Pegula (3)	3	Win	7–6^{(7–3)}, 6–4
Miami Open; Miami Gardens, United States; WTA 1000; Hard, outdoor; 21 March 2023 – 2 April 2023	26	F	(Czech Republic) Petra Kvitová (15)	12	Loss	6–7^{(14–16)}, 2–6
Billie Jean King Cup qualifying round; Kazakhstan vs. Poland; Astana, Kazakhstan; Billie Jean King Cup; Clay, indoor; 14 April 2023 – 15 April 2023	27	Q	(Poland) Weronika Falkowska	253	Win	6–3, 6–4
Billie Jean King Cup qualifying round; Kazakhstan vs. Poland; Astana, Kazakhstan; Billie Jean King Cup; Clay, indoor; 14 April 2023 – 15 April 2023	28	Q	(Poland) Magda Linette	19	Win	6–4, 6–2
Stuttgart Open; Stuttgart, Germany; WTA 500; Clay, indoor; 17 April 2022 – 23 April 2022	29	1R	(Germany) Jule Niemeier (WC)	65	Win	7–5, 6–3
Stuttgart Open; Stuttgart, Germany; WTA 500; Clay, indoor; 17 April 2022 – 23 April 2022	30	2R	(Brazil) Beatriz Haddad Maia	14	Loss	1–6, 1–3 ret
Madrid Open; Madrid, Spain; WTA 1000; Clay, outdoor; 25 April 2023 – 7 May 2023	–	1R	Bye			
Madrid Open; Madrid, Spain; WTA 1000; Clay, outdoor; 25 April 2023 – 7 May 2023	31	2R	Anna Kalinskaya	62	Loss	5–7, 6–4, 2–6
Italian Open; Rome, Italy; WTA 1000; Clay, outdoor; 9 May 2023 – 21 May 2023	–	1R	Bye			
Italian Open; Rome, Italy; WTA 1000; Clay, outdoor; 9 May 2023 – 21 May 2023	32	2R	(Italy) Jasmine Paolini	65	Win	7–6^{(7–3)}, 6–1
Italian Open; Rome, Italy; WTA 1000; Clay, outdoor; 9 May 2023 – 21 May 2023	33	3R	Anna Kalinskaya	57	Win	4–3 ret
Italian Open; Rome, Italy; WTA 1000; Clay, outdoor; 9 May 2023 – 21 May 2023	34	4R	(Czech Republic) Markéta Vondroušová	70	Win	6–3, 6–3
Italian Open; Rome, Italy; WTA 1000; Clay, outdoor; 9 May 2023 – 21 May 2023	35	QF	(Poland) Iga Świątek (1)	1	Win	2–6, 7–6^{(7–3)}, 2–2 ret
Italian Open; Rome, Italy; WTA 1000; Clay, outdoor; 9 May 2023 – 21 May 2023	36	SF	(Latvia) Jeļena Ostapenko (13)	20	Win	6–2, 6–4
Italian Open; Rome, Italy; WTA 1000; Clay, outdoor; 9 May 2023 – 21 May 2023	37	W	(Ukraine) Anhelina Kalinina (30)	47	Win (2)	6–4, 1–0 ret
French Open; Paris, France; Grand Slam; Clay, outdoor; 28 May 2023 – 11 June 2023	38	1R	(Czech Republic) Brenda Fruhvirtová (Q)	146	Win	6–4, 6–2
French Open; Paris, France; Grand Slam; Clay, outdoor; 28 May 2023 – 11 June 2023	39	2R	(Czech Republic) Linda Nosková	50	Win	6–3, 6–3
French Open; Paris, France; Grand Slam; Clay, outdoor; 28 May 2023 – 11 June 2023	–	3R	(Spain) Sara Sorribes Tormo (PR)	132	Withdrew	—N/a
German Open; Berlin, Germany; WTA 500; Grass, outdoor; 19 June 2023 – 25 June 2023	40	1R	Polina Kudermetova (Q)	139	Win	6–4, 6–2
German Open; Berlin, Germany; WTA 500; Grass, outdoor; 19 June 2023 – 25 June 2023	41	2R	(Croatia) Donna Vekić	23	Loss	7–6^{(7–1)}, 3–6, 4–6
Wimbledon; London, United Kingdom; Grand Slam; Grass, outdoor; 3 July 2023 – 16 July 2023	42	1R	(United States) Shelby Rogers	49	Win	4–6, 6–1, 6–2
Wimbledon; London, United Kingdom; Grand Slam; Grass, outdoor; 3 July 2023 – 16 July 2023	43	2R	(France) Alizé Cornet	84	Win	6–2, 7–6^{(7–2)}
Wimbledon; London, United Kingdom; Grand Slam; Grass, outdoor; 3 July 2023 – 16 July 2023	44	3R	(United Kingdom) Katie Boulter (WC)	89	Win	6–1, 6–1
Wimbledon; London, United Kingdom; Grand Slam; Grass, outdoor; 3 July 2023 – 16 July 2023	45	4R	(Brazil) Beatriz Haddad Maia (13)	13	Win	4–1 ret
Wimbledon; London, United Kingdom; Grand Slam; Grass, outdoor; 3 July 2023 – 16 July 2023	46	QF	(Tunisia) Ons Jabeur (6)	6	Loss	7–6^{(7–5)}, 4–6, 1–6
Canadian Open; Montréal, Canada; WTA 1000; Hard, outdoor; 7 August 2023 – 13 August 2023	–	1R	Bye			
Canadian Open; Montréal, Canada; WTA 1000; Hard, outdoor; 7 August 2023 – 13 August 2023	47	2R	(United States) Jennifer Brady (PR)	584	Win	6–7^{(3–7)}, 7–6^{(7–5)}, 6–3
Canadian Open; Montréal, Canada; WTA 1000; Hard, outdoor; 7 August 2023 – 13 August 2023	48	3R	(United States) Sloane Stephens	38	Win	6–3, 6–3
Canadian Open; Montréal, Canada; WTA 1000; Hard, outdoor; 7 August 2023 – 13 August 2023	49	QF	Daria Kasatkina (10)	14	Win	5–7, 7–5, 7–6^{(8–6)}
Canadian Open; Montréal, Canada; WTA 1000; Hard, outdoor; 7 August 2023 – 13 August 2023	50	SF	Liudmila Samsonova (15)	18	Loss	6–1, 1–6, 2–6
Cincinnati Open; Mason, United States; WTA 1000; Hard, outdoor; 13 August 2023 – 20 August 2023	–	1R	Bye			
Cincinnati Open; Mason, United States; WTA 1000; Hard, outdoor; 13 August 2023 – 20 August 2023	51	2R	(Latvia) Jeļena Ostapenko	20	Win	6–7^{(6–8)}, 6–2, 6–4
Cincinnati Open; Mason, United States; WTA 1000; Hard, outdoor; 13 August 2023 – 20 August 2023	52	3R	(Italy) Jasmine Paolini (Q)	43	Loss	6–4, 2–5 ret
US Open; New York City, United States; Grand Slam; Hard, outdoor; 28 August 2023 – 10 September 2023	53	1R	(Ukraine) Marta Kostyuk	39	Win	6–2, 6–1
US Open; New York City, United States; Grand Slam; Hard, outdoor; 28 August 2023 – 10 September 2023	–	2R	(Australia) Ajla Tomljanović	127	Walkover	—N/a
US Open; New York City, United States; Grand Slam; Hard, outdoor; 28 August 2023 – 10 September 2023	54	3R	(Romania) Sorana Cîrstea (30)	30	Loss	3–6, 7–6^{(7–4)}, 4–6
China Open; Beijing, China; WTA 1000; Hard, outdoor; 30 September 2023 – 8 October 2023	55	1R	(China) Zheng Qinwen	23	Win	6–1, 6–2
China Open; Beijing, China; WTA 1000; Hard, outdoor; 30 September 2023 – 8 October 2023	56	2R	(Germany) Tatjana Maria	53	Win	7–5, 6–0
China Open; Beijing, China; WTA 1000; Hard, outdoor; 30 September 2023 – 8 October 2023	57	3R	Mirra Andreeva (Q)	60	Win	2–6, 6–4, 6–1
China Open; Beijing, China; WTA 1000; Hard, outdoor; 30 September 2023 – 8 October 2023	58	QF	Aryna Sabalenka (1)	1	Win	7–5, 6–2
China Open; Beijing, China; WTA 1000; Hard, outdoor; 30 September 2023 – 8 October 2023	59	SF	Liudmila Samsonova	22	Loss	6–7^{(7–9)}, 3–6
WTA Finals; Cancún, Mexico; Year-end championships; Hard, indoor; 29 October 2023 – 5 November 2023	60	RR	(United States) Jessica Pegula (5)	5	Loss	5–7, 2–6
WTA Finals; Cancún, Mexico; Year-end championships; Hard, indoor; 29 October 2023 – 5 November 2023	61	RR	(Greece) Maria Sakkari (8)	9	Win	6–0, 6–7^{(4–7)}, 7–6^{(7–2)}
WTA Finals; Cancún, Mexico; Year-end championships; Hard, indoor; 29 October 2023 – 5 November 2023	62	RR	Aryna Sabalenka (1)	1	Loss	2–6, 6–3, 3–6

=== Doubles matches ===
Tournament	Match	Round	Opponents	Rank	Result	Score
Adelaide International 2; Adelaide, Australia; WTA 500; Hard, outdoor; 9 January 2023 – 15 January 2023; Partner: Anastasia Pavlyuchenkova	1	1R	(Romania) Ana Bogdan / Angelina Gabueva	333 / 99	Win	7–6^{(7–5)}, 6–2
Adelaide International 2; Adelaide, Australia; WTA 500; Hard, outdoor; 9 January 2023 – 15 January 2023; Partner: Anastasia Pavlyuchenkova	2	QF	(United States) Nicole Melichar-Martinez / (Australia) Samantha Stosur	19 / 133	Win	6–3, 6–3
Adelaide International 2; Adelaide, Australia; WTA 500; Hard, outdoor; 9 January 2023 – 15 January 2023; Partner: Anastasia Pavlyuchenkova	3	SF	(Ukraine) Lyudmyla Kichenok / (Latvia) Jeļena Ostapenko (3)	9 / 14	Win	6–4, 7–5
Adelaide International 2; Adelaide, Australia; WTA 500; Hard, outdoor; 9 January 2023 – 15 January 2023; Partner: Anastasia Pavlyuchenkova	4	F	(Brazil) Luisa Stefani / (United States) Taylor Townsend	47 / 24	Loss	5–7, 6–7^{(3–7)}
Australian Open; Melbourne, Australia; Grand Slam; Hard, outdoor; 16 January 2023 – 29 January 2023; Partner: Anastasia Pavlyuchenkova	5	1R	(Ukraine) Lyudmyla Kichenok / (Latvia) Jeļena Ostapenko (5)	9 / 11	Win	6–4, 6–4
Australian Open; Melbourne, Australia; Grand Slam; Hard, outdoor; 16 January 2023 – 29 January 2023; Partner: Anastasia Pavlyuchenkova	6	2R	(Chinese Taipei) Latisha Chan / (Chile) Alexa Guarachi	92 / 42	Win	6–1, 6–2
Australian Open; Melbourne, Australia; Grand Slam; Hard, outdoor; 16 January 2023 – 29 January 2023; Partner: Anastasia Pavlyuchenkova	7	3R	(Japan) Shuko Aoyama / (Japan) Ena Shibahara (10)	25 / 23	Loss	2–6, 6–7^{(7–9)}
Dubai Tennis Championships; Dubai, United Arab Emirates; WTA 1000; Hard, outdoor; 20 February 2023 – 26 February 2023; Partner: Anastasia Pavlyuchenkova	8	1R	(Belgium) Kirsten Flipkens / (Germany) Laura Siegemund (8)	33 / 24	Win	6–1, 6–2
Dubai Tennis Championships; Dubai, United Arab Emirates; WTA 1000; Hard, outdoor; 20 February 2023 – 26 February 2023; Partner: Anastasia Pavlyuchenkova	–	2R	(Romania) Monica Niculescu / (Belgium) Kimberley Zimmermann	41 / 39	Withdrew	—N/a
Indian Wells Open; Indian Wells, United States; WTA 1000; Hard, outdoor; 6 March 2023 – 19 March 2023; Partner: (Spain) Paula Badosa	9	1R	(Australia) Storm Hunter / (Belgium) Elise Mertens (6)	14 / 13	Loss	6–7^{(2–7)}, 2–6
Madrid Open; Madrid, Spain; WTA 1000; Clay, outdoor; 25 April 2023 – 7 May 2023; Partner: Anastasia Pavlyuchenkova	10	1R	(Japan) Shuko Aoyama / (Japan) Ena Shibahara (7)	19 / 21	Win	6–0, 6–1
Madrid Open; Madrid, Spain; WTA 1000; Clay, outdoor; 25 April 2023 – 7 May 2023; Partner: Anastasia Pavlyuchenkova	–	2R	(Ukraine) Marta Kostyuk / (Romania) Elena-Gabriela Ruse	32 / 39	Withdrew	—N/a

== Tournament schedule ==
=== Singles schedule ===
Date	Tournament	Location	Category	Surface	Prev. result	Prev. points	New points	Outcome
1 January 2023 – 8 January 2023	Adelaide International 1	Australia	WTA 500	Hard	F	305	55	Second round lost to (Ukraine) Marta Kostyuk 7–6^{(7–5)}, 2–6, 3–6
9 January 2023 – 14 January 2023	Adelaide International 2	Australia	WTA 500	Hard	—N/a	—N/a	1	First round lost to (Czech Republic) Petra Kvitova 3–6, 5–7
16 January 2023 – 29 January 2023	Australian Open	Australia	Grand Slam	Hard	2R	70	1300	Final lost to Aryna Sabalenka 6–4, 3–6, 4–6
6 February 2023– 12 February 2023	Abu Dhabi Open	Abu Dhabi, UAE	WTA 500	Hard	—N/a	—N/a	100	Quarterfinal lost to (Brazil) Beatriz Haddad Maia 6–3, 3–6, 2–6
20 February 2023 – 26 February 2023	Dubai Tennis Championships	United Arab Emirates	WTA 1000	Hard	—N/a	—N/a	105	Withdrew prior to the third round
6 March 2023 – 19 March 2023	Indian Wells Open	United States	WTA 1000	Hard	QF	215	1000	Winner, defeated Aryna Sabalenka 7–6^{(13–11)}, 6–4
21 March 2023 – 2 April 2023	Miami Open	United States	WTA 1000	Hard	3R	65	650	Final lost to (Czech Republic) Petra Kvitova 6–7^{(14–16)}, 2–6
17 April 2023 – 23 April 2023	Stuttgart Open	Germany	WTA 500	Clay (i)	2R	55	55	Second round lost to (Brazil) Beatriz Haddad Maia 1–6, 1–3 ret.
24 April 2023 – 7 May 2023	Madrid Open	Spain	WTA 1000	Clay	3R	120	10	Second round lost to Anna Kalinskaya 5–7, 6–4, 2–6
9 May 2023 – 21 May 2023	Italian Open	Italy	WTA 1000	Clay	3R	105	1000	Winner, defeated (Ukraine) Anhelina Kalinina 6–4, 1–0 ret.
28 May 2023 – 11 June 2023	French Open	France	Grand Slam	Clay	3R	130	130	Withdrew prior to the third round
19 June 2023 – 25 June 2023	German Open	Germany	WTA 500	Grass	—N/a	—N/a	55	Second round lost to (Croatia) Donna Vekić 7–6^{(7–1)}, 3–6, 4–6
3 July 2022 – 16 July 2022	Wimbledon	United Kingdom	Grand Slam	Grass	W	—N/a (Note: Following the All England Lawn Tennis and Croquet Club's decision to ban Russian and Belarusian players from the 2022 Wimbledon Championships due to the Russian invasion of Ukraine, the ITF, ATP, and WTA stripped the event of ranking points.)	430	Quarterfinal lost to (Tunisia) Ons Jabeur 7–6^{(7–5)}, 4–6, 1–6
7 August 2023 – 13 August 2023	Canadian Open	Canada	WTA 1000	Hard	2R	60	350	Semifinal lost to Liudmila Samsonova 6–1, 1–6, 2–6
13 August 2023 – 20 August 2023	Cincinnati Open	United States	WTA 1000	Hard	QF	190	105	Third round lost to (Italy) Jasmine Paolini 6–4, 2–5 ret.
28 August 2023 – 4 September 2023	US Open	United States	Grand Slam	Hard	1R	10	130	Third round lost to (Romania) Sorana Cirstea 3–6, 7–6^{(8–6)}, 4–6
30 September 2023 – 8 October 2023	China Open	China	WTA 1000	Hard	Not held	0	390	Semifinal lost to Liudmila Samsonova 6–7^{(7–9)}, 3–6
29 October 2023 – 5 November 2023	WTA Finals	Mexico	WTA Finals	Hard	DNQ	0	500	Eliminated in Group Stage
Total year-end points						1860	6365	▲4,505

== Yearly records ==
=== Head-to-head match-ups ===
Rybakina has a 47–15 WTA match win–loss record in the 2023 season. Her record against players who were part of the WTA rankings top ten at the time of their meetings is 7–4. Bold indicates player was ranked top 10 at the time of at least one meeting. The following list is ordered by number of wins:

- **(Poland) Iga Świątek** 3–0
- (Latvia) Jeļena Ostapenko 3–0
- (United States) Danielle Collins 2–0
- (Spain) Paula Badosa 2–0
- Anna Kalinskaya 2–1
- **Aryna Sabalenka** 2–2
- (Italy) Elisabetta Cocciaretto 1–0
- (Slovenia) Kaja Juvan 1–0
- Victoria Azarenka 1–0
- (Czech Republic) Karolína Plíšková 1–0
- (Canada) Bianca Andreescu 1–0
- (Czech Republic) Marie Bouzková 1–0
- (United States) Sofia Kenin 1–0
- (France) Varvara Gracheva 1–0
- (Czech Republic) Karolína Muchová 1–0
- (Belgium) Elise Mertens 1–0
- (Italy) Martina Trevisan 1–0
- (Poland) Weronika Falkowska 1–0
- (Poland) Magda Linette 1–0
- (Germany) Jule Niemeier 1–0
- (Czech Republic) Markéta Vondroušová 1–0
- (Ukraine) Anhelina Kalinina 1–0
- (Czech Republic) Brenda Fruhvirtová 1–0
- (Czech Republic) Linda Nosková 1–0
- Polina Kudermetova 1–0
- (United States) Shelby Rogers 1–0
- (France) Alizé Cornet 1–0
- (United Kingdom) Katie Boulter 1–0
- (United States) Jennifer Brady 1–0
- (United States) Sloane Stephens 1–0
- Daria Kasatkina 1–0
- (China) Zheng Qinwen 1–0
- (Germany) Tatjana Maria 1–0
- Mirra Andreeva 1–0
- **(Greece) Maria Sakkari** 1–0
- (Ukraine) Marta Kostyuk 1–1
- **(United States) Jessica Pegula** 1–1
- (Italy) Jasmine Paolini 1–1
- (Brazil) Beatriz Haddad Maia 1–2
- (Croatia) Donna Vekić 0–1
- **(Tunisia) Ons Jabeur** 0–1
- (Romania) Sorana Cîrstea 0–1
- (Czech Republic) Petra Kvitová 0–2
- Liudmila Samsonova 0–2

=== Top 10 Record ===
Result	W–L	Player	Rank	Event	Surface	Rd	Score	Rank
Win	1–0	(Poland) Iga Świątek	No. 1	Australian Open, Australia	Hard	4R	6–4, 6–4	No. 25
Loss	1–1	Aryna Sabalenka	No. 5	Australian Open, Australia	Hard	F	6–4, 3–6, 4–6	No. 25
Win	2–1	(Poland) Iga Świątek	No. 1	Indian Wells Open, U.S.	Hard	SF	6–2, 6–2	No. 10
Win	3–1	Aryna Sabalenka	No. 2	Indian Wells Open, U.S.	Hard	F	7–6^{(13–11)}, 6–4	No. 10
Win	4–1	(United States) Jessica Pegula	No. 3	Miami Open, U.S.	Hard	SF	7–6^{(7–3)}, 6–4	No. 7
Win	5–1	(Poland) Iga Świątek	No. 1	Italian Open, Italy	Clay	QF	2–6, 7–6^{(7–3)}, 2–2, ret.	No. 6
Loss	5–2	(Tunisia) Ons Jabeur	No. 6	Wimbledon, UK	Grass	QF	7–6^{(7–5)}, 4–6, 1–6	No. 3
Win	6–2	Aryna Sabalenka	No. 1	China Open, China	Hard	QF	7–5, 6–2	No. 5
Loss	6–3	(United States) Jessica Pegula	No. 5	WTA Finals, Mexico	Hard	RR	5–7, 2–6	No. 4
Win	7–3	(Greece) Maria Sakkari	No. 9	WTA Finals, Mexico	Hard	RR	6–0, 6–7^{(4–7)}, 7–6^{(7–2)}	No. 4
Loss	7–4	Aryna Sabalenka	No. 1	WTA Finals, Mexico	Hard	RR	2–6, 6–3, 3–6	No. 4

=== Finals ===
==== Singles: 4 (2 titles, 2 runner-ups) ====
Legend Grand Slam tournaments (0–1) WTA 1000 (2–1) WTA 500 (Premier) (0–0) WTA 250 (International) (0–0)	Finals by surface Hard (2–1) Grass (0–0) Clay (1–0)

Result	W–L	Date	Tournament	Tier	Surface	Opponent	Score
Loss	0–1	Jan 2023	Australian Open, Australia	Grand Slam	Hard	Aryna Sabalenka	6–4, 3–6, 4–6
Win	1–1	Mar 2023	Indian Wells Open, United States	WTA 1000	Hard	Aryna Sabalenka	7–6^{(13–11)}, 6–4
Loss	1–2	Apr 2023	Miami Open, United States	WTA 1000	Hard	(Czech Republic) Petra Kvitová	6–7^{(14–16)}, 2–6
Win	2–2	May 2023	Italian Open, Italy	WTA 1000	Clay	(Ukraine) Anhelina Kalinina	6–4, 1–0, ret.

==== Doubles: 1 (1 runner-up) ====
Legend WTA 500 (0–1)	Finals by surface Hard (0–1)

Result	W–L	Date	Tournament	Tier	Surface	Partner	Opponents	Score
Loss	0–1	Jan 2023	Adelaide International, Australia	WTA 500	Hard	Anastasia Pavlyuchenkova	(Brazil) Luisa Stefani (United States) Taylor Townsend	5–7, 6–7^{(3–7)}

=== Earnings ===
- **Bold** font denotes tournament win

#	Tournament	Singles Prize money	Doubles Prize money	Year-to-date
1.	Adelaide International 1	$11,145	$0	$11,145
2.	Adelaide International 2	$6,750	$11,000	$18,995
3.	Australian Open	$1,136,556	$23,518	$1,179,069
4.	Abu Dhabi Open	$18,685	$0	$1,197,754
5.	Dubai Tennis Championships	$31,650	$5,925	$1,235,329
6.	**Indian Wells Open**	**$1,262,220**	$9,010	$2,506,559
7.	Miami Open	$662,360	$0	$3,168,919
8.	Stuttgart Open	$10,086	$0	$3,179,005
9.	Madrid Open	$27,045	$14,650	$3,220,700
10.	**Italian Open**	**$521,754**	$0	$3,742,454
11.	French Open	$142,000	$0	$3,884,454
12.	German Open	$10,086	$0	$3,894,540
13.	Wimbledon	$430,347	$0	$4,324,887
14.	Canadian Open	$138,000	$0	$4,462,887
15.	Cincinnati Open	$31,650	$0	$4,494,537
16.	US Open	$191,000	$0	$4,685,537
17.	China Open	$402,000	$0	$5,087,537
18.	WTA Finals	$396,000	$0	$5,493,437
**Total prize money**		**$5,429,334**	**$64,103**	**$5,493,437**

Figures in United States dollars (USD) unless noted.
