= 2024 Adelaide International – Men's doubles =

Men's doubles
- 2024 Adelaide International

Final
- Champions: (United States) Rajeev Ram (United Kingdom) Joe Salisbury
- Runners-up: (India) Rohan Bopanna (Australia) Matthew Ebden
- Score: 7–5, 5–7, [11–9]

Events
Singles	men	women
Doubles	men	women
- Adelaide International

Rajeev Ram and Joe Salisbury defeated Rohan Bopanna and Matthew Ebden in the final, 7–5, 5–7, [11–9] to win the men's doubles tennis title at the 2024 Adelaide International.

Lloyd Glasspool and Harri Heliövaara, and Marcelo Arévalo and Jean-Julien Rojer were the reigning champions in the first and second editions, respectively. Both Glasspool and Rojer partnered together, but lost in the second round to Gonzalo Escobar and Aleksandr Nedovyesov, while Heliövaara partnered with Andrew Harris, but lost to Francisco Cabral and Henry Patten in the first round, and Arévalo chose to compete in Auckland instead.

== Seeds ==
All seeds received a bye into the second round.

1. (Croatia) Ivan Dodig / (United States) Austin Krajicek (quarterfinals, withdrew)
2. (India) Rohan Bopanna / (Australia) Matthew Ebden (final)
3. (United States) Rajeev Ram / (United Kingdom) Joe Salisbury (champions)
4. (Mexico) Santiago González / (United Kingdom) Neal Skupski (second round)
5. (Monaco) Hugo Nys / (Poland) Jan Zieliński (semifinals)
6. (Germany) Kevin Krawietz / (Germany) Tim Pütz (withdrew)
7. (United Kingdom) Lloyd Glasspool / (Netherlands) Jean-Julien Rojer (second round)
8. (France) Nicolas Mahut / (France) Édouard Roger-Vasselin (second round)

== Draw ==
Key

- Q = Qualifier
- WC = Wild card
- LL = Lucky loser
- Alt = Alternate
- ITF = ITF entry
- PR = Protected ranking
- SR = Special ranking
- SE = Special exempt
- JE = Junior exempt
- JR = Junior Accelerator Programme entrant
- CO = College Accelerator Programme entrant
- NG = Next Gen Accelerator Program entrant
- w/o = Walkover
- r = Retired
- d = Defaulted

=== Finals ===
Semifinals
5	(Monaco) Hugo Nys (Poland) Jan Zieliński	6^{4}	7	[6]
3	(United States) Rajeev Ram (United Kingdom) Joe Salisbury	7^{7}	5	[10]
(Ecuador) Gonzalo Escobar (Kazakhstan) Aleksandr Nedovyesov	4	4
2	(India) Rohan Bopanna (Australia) Matthew Ebden	6	6

Final
3	(United States) Rajeev Ram (United Kingdom) Joe Salisbury	7	5	[11]
2	(India) Rohan Bopanna (Australia) Matthew Ebden	5	7	[9]

=== Top half ===
First round
(Australia) A Harris (Finland) H Heliövaara	6	7
(Portugal) F Cabral (United Kingdom) H Patten	4	5
(Brazil) M Melo (Netherlands) M Middelkoop	7	6
WC	(Australia) B Ellis (Australia) C Puttergill	5	4
(Uruguay) A Behar (Czech Republic) A Pavlásek	6	4	[8]
(Germany) A Mies (Australia) J-P Smith	4	6	[10]
(United States) E King (United States) R Stalder	6	6
(Romania) VV Cornea (Serbia) D Lajović	2	4

Second round
1	(Croatia) I Dodig (United States) A Krajicek	7^{7}	2	[10]
(Australia) A Harris (Finland) H Heliövaara	6^{3}	6	[4]
(Brazil) M Melo (Netherlands) M Middelkoop
5	(Monaco) H Nys (Poland) J Zieliński	w/o
3	(United States) R Ram (United Kingdom) J Salisbury	6	7^{7}
(Germany) A Mies (Australia) J-P Smith	3	6^{2}
(United States) E King (United States) R Stalder	3	6	[9]
Alt	(Ecuador) D Hidalgo (Colombia) C Rodríguez	6	4	[11]

Quarterfinals
1	(Croatia) I Dodig (United States) A Krajicek
5	(Monaco) H Nys (Poland) J Zieliński	w/o
3	(United States) R Ram (United Kingdom) J Salisbury	6	6
Alt	(Ecuador) D Hidalgo (Colombia) C Rodríguez	4	2

Semifinals
5	(Monaco) H Nys (Poland) J Zieliński	6^{4}	7	[6]
3	(United States) R Ram (United Kingdom) J Salisbury	7^{7}	5	[10]

=== Bottom half ===
First round
(Ecuador) G Escobar (Kazakhstan) A Nedovyesov	6	6
Alt	(Brazil) T Seyboth Wild (Peru) JP Varillas	2	4
WC	(Australia) A Bolt (Australia) L Saville	4	4
(Germany) C Frantzen (Germany) H Jebens	6	6
(Colombia) N Barrientos (Brazil) R Matos	6	6
A Shevchenko (Spain) B Zapata Miralles	2	3
(Sweden) A Göransson (France) A Olivetti	6	4	[10]
(Serbia) N Ćaćić (Ukraine) D Molchanov	3	6	[8]

Second round
7	(United Kingdom) L Glasspool (Netherlands) J-J Rojer	4	4
(Ecuador) G Escobar (Kazakhstan) A Nedovyesov	6	6
(Germany) C Frantzen (Germany) H Jebens	7^{12}	6^{4}	[10]
4	(Mexico) S González (United Kingdom) N Skupski	6^{10}	7^{7}	[8]
8	(France) N Mahut (France) É Roger-Vasselin	6^{1}	4
(Colombia) N Barrientos (Brazil) R Matos	7^{7}	6
(Sweden) A Göransson (France) A Olivetti
2	(India) R Bopanna (Australia) M Ebden	w/o

Quarterfinals
(Ecuador) G Escobar (Kazakhstan) A Nedovyesov	6	6
(Germany) C Frantzen (Germany) H Jebens	3	3
(Colombia) N Barrientos (Brazil) R Matos	2	7^{7}	[7]
2	(India) R Bopanna (Australia) M Ebden	6	6^{4}	[10]

Semifinals
(Ecuador) G Escobar (Kazakhstan) A Nedovyesov	4	4
2	(India) R Bopanna (Australia) M Ebden	6	6
