= 2024 Adelaide International =

Tennis tournament

- Date: 8–13 January 2024
- Category: ATP 250; WTA 500
- Draw: 28S / 24D (ATP); 30S / 16D (WTA)
- Surface: Hard / outdoor
- Location: Memorial Drive Tennis Centre
- Venue: Adelaide, Australia

Champions

Men's singles
- (Czech Republic) Jiří Lehečka

Women's singles
- (Latvia) Jeļena Ostapenko

Men's doubles
- (United States) Rajeev Ram / (United Kingdom) Joe Salisbury

Women's doubles
- (Brazil) Beatriz Haddad Maia / (United States) Taylor Townsend
← 2023 ·	Adelaide International	· 2025 →

The 2024 Adelaide International was a professional tennis tournament on the 2024 ATP Tour and 2024 WTA Tour. It was a combined ATP Tour 250 and WTA 500 tournament played on outdoor hard court at Memorial Drive Tennis Centre, Adelaide, Australia. The tournament was held from 8 to 13 January 2024.

== Champions ==
=== Men's singles ===
- (Czech Republic) Jiří Lehečka def. (United Kingdom) Jack Draper, 4–6, 6–4, 6–3

=== Women's singles ===
- (Latvia) Jeļena Ostapenko def. Daria Kasatkina 6–3, 6–2

=== Men's doubles ===
- (United States) Rajeev Ram / (United Kingdom) Joe Salisbury def. (India) Rohan Bopanna / (Australia) Matthew Ebden, 7–5, 5–7, [11–9]

=== Women's doubles ===
- (Brazil) Beatriz Haddad Maia / (United States) Taylor Townsend def. (France) Caroline Garcia / (France) Kristina Mladenovic, 7–5, 6–3

== Point distribution ==
Event	W	F	SF	QF	Round of 16	Round of 32	Q	Q2	Q1
Men's singles	250	165	100	50	25	0	13	7	0
Men's doubles	250	150	90	45	20	0	—	—	—
Women's singles	500	325	195	108	60	1	25	13	1
Women's doubles	500	325	195	108	1	—	—	—	—

== ATP singles main-draw entrants ==
=== Seeds ===
Country	Player	Rank^{1}	Seed
USA	Tommy Paul	13	1
CHI	Nicolás Jarry	19	2
USA	Sebastian Korda	24	3
ITA	Lorenzo Musetti	27	4
ARG	Sebastián Báez	28	5
ARG	Tomás Martín Etcheverry	30	6
CZE	Jiří Lehečka	31	7
KAZ	Alexander Bublik	32	8

^{1} Rankings are as of 1 January 2024

=== Other entrants ===
The following players received wildcards into the singles main draw:

- (Australia) Rinky Hijikata
- (Australia) Thanasi Kokkinakis
- (Australia) Christopher O'Connell

The following players received entry from the qualifying draw:

- (Australia) Alex Bolt
- (Argentina) Facundo Díaz Acosta
- (France) Arthur Rinderknech
- (Australia) Adam Walton

The following players received entry as lucky losers:

- (Australia) James McCabe
- (Brazil) Thiago Seyboth Wild
- (Spain) Bernabé Zapata Miralles

=== Withdrawals ===
- (Hungary) Márton Fucsovics → replaced by (Spain) Bernabé Zapata Miralles
- (Netherlands) Tallon Griekspoor → replaced by (Serbia) Dušan Lajović
- (France) Ugo Humbert → replaced by (Australia) Jordan Thompson
- (Japan) Yoshihito Nishioka → replaced by (Brazil) Thiago Seyboth Wild
- (United States) Reilly Opelka → replaced by (Germany) Yannick Hanfmann
- (Australia) Alexei Popyrin → replaced by (Australia) James McCabe
- Roman Safiullin → replaced by (Serbia) Miomir Kecmanović

== ATP doubles main-draw entrants ==
=== Seeds ===
Country	Player	Country	Player	Rank^{1}	Seed
CRO	Ivan Dodig	USA	Austin Krajicek	3	1
IND	Rohan Bopanna	AUS	Matthew Ebden	7	2
USA	Rajeev Ram	GBR	Joe Salisbury	13	3
MEX	Santiago González	GBR	Neal Skupski	20	4
MON	Hugo Nys	POL	Jan Zieliński	35	5
~~GER~~	~~Kevin Krawietz~~	~~GER~~	~~Tim Pütz~~	~~45~~	~~6~~
GBR	Lloyd Glasspool	NED	Jean-Julien Rojer	49	7
FRA	Nicolas Mahut	FRA	Édouard Roger-Vasselin	49	8

^{1} Rankings are as of 1 January 2024

=== Other entrants ===
The following pairs received wildcards into the doubles main draw:

- (Australia) Alex Bolt / (Australia) Luke Saville
- (Australia) Blake Ellis / (Australia) Calum Puttergill

The following pairs received entry as alternates:

- (Ecuador) Diego Hidalgo / (Colombia) Cristian Rodríguez
- (Brazil) Thiago Seyboth Wild / (Peru) Juan Pablo Varillas

=== Withdrawals ===
- (Argentina) Facundo Díaz Acosta / (Argentina) Tomás Martín Etcheverry → replaced by (Brazil) Thiago Seyboth Wild / (Peru) Juan Pablo Varillas
- (Finland) Harri Heliövaara / (Australia) John Peers → replaced by (Australia) Andrew Harris / (Finland) Harri Heliövaara
- (Germany) Kevin Krawietz / (Germany) Tim Pütz → replaced by (Ecuador) Diego Hidalgo / (Colombia) Cristian Rodríguez

== WTA singles main-draw entrants ==
=== Seeds ===
Country	Player	Rank^{1}	Seed
KAZ	Elena Rybakina	4	1
USA	Jessica Pegula	5	2
~~CZE~~	~~Markéta Vondroušová~~	~~7~~	~~3~~
CZE	Barbora Krejčíková	10	4
BRA	Beatriz Haddad Maia	11	5
LAT	Jeļena Ostapenko	12	6
	Liudmila Samsonova	15	7
	Veronika Kudermetova	16	8

^{1} Rankings are as of 1 January 2024

=== Other entrants ===
The following players received wildcards into the singles main draw:

- (Spain) Paula Badosa
- (Czech Republic) Karolína Plíšková
- (Australia) Taylah Preston
- ~~(Australia) Ajla Tomljanović~~

The following player received entry using a protected ranking into the main draw:

- ~~(Germany) Angelique Kerber~~

The following player received entry as a special exempt:

- (Germany) Laura Siegemund

The following players received entry from the qualifying draw:

- (United Kingdom) Katie Boulter
- Anna Kalinskaya
- (United States) Claire Liu
- Anastasia Pavlyuchenkova
- Aliaksandra Sasnovich
- (Czech Republic) Kateřina Siniaková

The following players received entry as lucky losers:

- (Romania) Ana Bogdan
- (Spain) Cristina Bucșa
- (United States) Ashlyn Krueger
- (United States) Bernarda Pera
- (United States) Taylor Townsend

=== Withdrawals ===
- (United States) Madison Keys → replaced by (Romania) Ana Bogdan
- (Czech Republic) Karolína Muchová → replaced by (Italy) Jasmine Paolini
- Anastasia Potapova → replaced by (United States) Ashlyn Krueger
- (Ukraine) Elina Svitolina → replaced by (Ukraine) Marta Kostyuk
- (Australia) Ajla Tomljanović → replaced by (Spain) Cristina Bucșa
- (Czech Republic) Markéta Vondroušová → replaced by (United States) Taylor Townsend
- (China) Zheng Qinwen → replaced by (United States) Bernarda Pera

== WTA doubles main-draw entrants ==
=== Seeds ===
Country	Player	Country	Player	Rank^{1}	Seed
CZE	Barbora Krejčiková	GER	Laura Siegemund	18	1
CAN	Gabriela Dabrowski	NZL	Erin Routliffe	18	2
BRA	Beatriz Haddad Maia	USA	Taylor Townsend	31	3
USA	Nicole Melichar-Martinez	AUS	Ellen Perez	32	4

^{1} Rankings are as of 1 January 2024

=== Other entrants ===
The following pair received a wildcard into the doubles main draw:

- (Australia) Elena Micic / (Australia) Tina Smith

The following pair received entry as alternates:

- (Italy) Angelica Moratelli / (United Kingdom) Samantha Murray Sharan

=== Withdrawals ===
- Veronika Kudermetova / Anastasia Pavlyuchenkova → replaced by (Italy) Angelica Moratelli / (United Kingdom) Samantha Murray Sharan
