= 2023 Adelaide International =

2023 Adelaide International may refer to:

- 2023 Adelaide International 1, an ATP 250 and WTA 500 tournament in week one of 2023
- 2023 Adelaide International 2, an ATP 250 and WTA 500 tournament in week two of 2023
