= 2024 Adelaide International – Women's singles =

Women's singles
- 2024 Adelaide International

Final
- Champion: (Latvia) Jeļena Ostapenko
- Runner-up: Daria Kasatkina
- Score: 6–3, 6–2

Details
- Draw: 30
- Seeds: 8

Events
Singles	men	women
Doubles	men	women
- Adelaide International

Jeļena Ostapenko defeated Daria Kasatkina in the final, 6–3, 6–2 to win the women's singles tennis title at the 2024 Adelaide International. With her run, Ostapenko returned to the top ten of the WTA rankings for the first time since September 2018.

Aryna Sabalenka and Belinda Bencic were the reigning champions from the first and second editions of the 2023 tournament, respectively, but Sabalenka chose to compete in Brisbane instead and Bencic did not participate this year due to pregnancy.

== Seeds ==
The top two seeds received a bye into the second round.

1. (Kazakhstan) Elena Rybakina (quarterfinals)
2. (United States) Jessica Pegula (semifinals, withdrew)
3. (Czech Republic) Markéta Vondroušová (withdrew)
4. (Czech Republic) Barbora Krejčíková (first round)
5. (Brazil) Beatriz Haddad Maia (first round)
6. (Latvia) Jeļena Ostapenko (champion)
7. Liudmila Samsonova (first round)
8. Veronika Kudermetova (second round)

== Draw ==
Key

- Q = Qualifier
- WC = Wild card
- LL = Lucky loser
- Alt = Alternate
- ITF = ITF entry
- PR = Protected ranking
- SR = Special ranking
- SE = Special exempt
- JE = Junior exempt
- JR = Junior Accelerator Programme entrant
- CO = College Accelerator Programme entrant
- NG = Next Gen Accelerator Program entrant
- w/o = Walkover
- r = Retired
- d = Defaulted

=== Finals ===
Semifinals
Ekaterina Alexandrova	2	6^{3}
6	(Latvia) Jeļena Ostapenko	6	7^{7}
Daria Kasatkina	w/o
2	(United States) Jessica Pegula

Final
6	(Latvia) Jeļena Ostapenko	6	6
Daria Kasatkina	3	2

=== Top half ===
First round
(Italy) J Paolini	3	3
LL	(Spain) C Bucșa	6	6
(Poland) M Linette	6	6^{8}	5
E Alexandrova	3	7^{10}	7
LL	(United States) A Krueger	2	5
8	V Kudermetova	6	7
LL	(United States) T Townsend	6	7^{7}
Q	A Sasnovich	3	6^{4}
(Ukraine) A Kalinina	6^{3}	1
(Ukraine) M Kostyuk	7^{7}	6
WC	(Australia) T Preston	4	6	3
(France) C Garcia	6	1	6
(Romania) S Cîrstea	6	2	4
6	(Latvia) J Ostapenko	2	6	6

Second round
1	(Kazakhstan) E Rybakina	6	7
LL	(Spain) C Bucșa	3	5
E Alexandrova	6	6
8	V Kudermetova	4	4
LL	(United States) T Townsend	3	6	4
(Ukraine) M Kostyuk	6	2	6
(France) C Garcia	4	7	4
6	(Latvia) J Ostapenko	6	5	6

Quarterfinals
1	(Kazakhstan) E Rybakina	3	3
E Alexandrova	6	6
(Ukraine) M Kostyuk	5	3
6	(Latvia) J Ostapenko	7	6

Semifinals
E Alexandrova	2	6^{3}
6	(Latvia) J Ostapenko	6	7^{7}

=== Bottom half ===
First round
7	L Samsonova	7^{7}	4	4
SE	(Germany) L Siegemund	6^{1}	6	6
Q	(United Kingdom) K Boulter	3	4
LL	(Romania) A Bogdan	6	6
Q	(United States) C Liu	4	3
D Kasatkina	6	6
Q	A Kalinskaya	7	3	7
4	(Czech Republic) B Krejčíková	5	6	5
5	(Brazil) B Haddad Maia	3	4
Q	A Pavlyuchenkova	6	6
Q	(Czech Republic) K Siniaková	6	6
WC	(Czech Republic) Ka Plíšková	2	1
WC	(Spain) P Badosa	6	2	3
LL	(United States) B Pera	3	6	6

Second round
SE	(Germany) L Siegemund	6	7
LL	(Romania) A Bogdan	4	5
D Kasatkina	5	6	7
Q	A Kalinskaya	7	4	5
Q	A Pavlyuchenkova	2	6	6
Q	(Czech Republic) K Siniaková	6	3	2
LL	(United States) B Pera	6	2	3
2	(United States) J Pegula	4	6	6

Quarterfinals
SE	(Germany) L Siegemund
D Kasatkina	w/o
Q	A Pavlyuchenkova	7^{7}	5	4
2	(United States) J Pegula	6^{1}	7	6

Semifinals
D Kasatkina	w/o
2	(United States) J Pegula

== Qualifying ==
=== Seeds ===
1. (Ukraine) Marta Kostyuk (moved to main draw)
2. (Czech Republic) Kateřina Siniaková (qualified)
3. (Italy) Camila Giorgi (first round)
4. (United Kingdom) Katie Boulter (qualified)
5. Anastasia Pavlyuchenkova (qualified)
6. (Spain) Cristina Bucșa (qualifying competition, lucky loser)
7. (Romania) Ana Bogdan (qualifying competition, lucky loser)
8. (United States) Bernarda Pera (qualifying competition, lucky loser)
9. Elina Avanesyan (first round)
10. (United States) Ashlyn Krueger (qualifying competition, lucky loser)
11. Anna Kalinskaya (qualified)
12. (United States) Taylor Townsend (qualifying competition, lucky loser)

=== Qualifiers ===
1. Aliaksandra Sasnovich
2. (Czech Republic) Kateřina Siniaková
3. (United States) Claire Liu
4. (United Kingdom) Katie Boulter
5. Anastasia Pavlyuchenkova
6. Anna Kalinskaya

=== Lucky losers ===
1. (Spain) Cristina Bucșa
2. (United States) Ashlyn Krueger
3. (United States) Bernarda Pera
4. (Romania) Ana Bogdan
5. (United States) Taylor Townsend

=== Qualifying draw ===
==== First qualifier ====
First round
Alt	(Norway) Ulrikke Eikeri	6	5	7
Alt	(United Kingdom) Samantha Murray Sharan	3	7	5
Aliaksandra Sasnovich	7^{7}	4	6
9	Elina Avanesyan	6^{4}	6	2

Qualifying competition
Alt	(Norway) Ulrikke Eikeri	3	2
Aliaksandra Sasnovich	6	6

==== Second qualifier ====
First round
2	(Czech Republic) Kateřina Siniaková	6	7^{7}
(China) Wang Yafan	3	6^{3}
(Germany) Tamara Korpatsch	6^{3}	5
8	(United States) Bernarda Pera	7^{7}	7

Qualifying competition
2	(Czech Republic) Kateřina Siniaková	6	6
8	(United States) Bernarda Pera	3	1

==== Third qualifier ====
First round
3	(Italy) Camila Giorgi	3	1
(United States) Claire Liu	6	6
WC	(Australia) Tina Smith	4	6	2
12	(United States) Taylor Townsend	6	3	6

Qualifying competition
(United States) Claire Liu	6	6
12	(United States) Taylor Townsend	4	1

==== Fourth qualifier ====
First round
4	(United Kingdom) Katie Boulter	6	5	6
(United States) Alycia Parks	4	7	0
Kamilla Rakhimova	5	2
10	(United States) Ashlyn Krueger	7	6

Qualifying competition
4	(United Kingdom) Katie Boulter	7^{7}	6
10	(United States) Ashlyn Krueger	6^{1}	1

==== Fifth qualifier ====
First round
5	Anastasia Pavlyuchenkova	6	6
WC	(Australia) Alexandra Osborne	0	3
(France) Kristina Mladenovic	1	2
7	(Romania) Ana Bogdan	6	6

Qualifying competition
5	Anastasia Pavlyuchenkova	6	6
7	(Romania) Ana Bogdan	2	2

==== Sixth qualifier ====
First round
6	(Spain) Cristina Bucșa	6	6
WC	(Australia) Tahlia Kokkinis	0	1
WC	(Australia) Elena Micic	2	1
11	Anna Kalinskaya	6	6

Qualifying competition
6	(Spain) Cristina Bucșa	0	2
11	Anna Kalinskaya	6	6
