= 2024 Adelaide International – Men's singles =

Men's singles
- 2024 Adelaide International

Final
- Champion: (Czech Republic) Jiří Lehečka
- Runner-up: (United Kingdom) Jack Draper
- Score: 4–6, 6–4, 6–3

Details
- Draw: 28
- Seeds: 8

Events
Singles	men	women
Doubles	men	women
← 2023 ·	Adelaide International	· 2025 →

Jiří Lehečka defeated Jack Draper in the final, 4–6, 6–4, 6–3 to win the men's singles tennis title at the 2024 Adelaide International. It was his first ATP Tour title.

Novak Djokovic and Kwon Soon-woo were the reigning champions from the first and second editions of the 2023 tournament, respectively, but either player did not participate this year.

== Seeds ==
The top four seeds received a bye into the second round.

1. (United States) Tommy Paul (quarterfinals)
2. (Chile) Nicolás Jarry (quarterfinals)
3. (United States) Sebastian Korda (semifinals)
4. (Italy) Lorenzo Musetti (quarterfinals)
5. (Argentina) Sebastián Báez (first round)
6. (Argentina) Tomás Martín Etcheverry (first round)
7. (Czech Republic) Jiří Lehečka (champion)
8. (Kazakhstan) Alexander Bublik (semifinals)

== Draw ==
=== Key ===
- Q = Qualifier
- WC = Wild card
- LL = Lucky loser
- Alt = Alternate
- ITF = ITF entry
- PR = Protected ranking
- SR = Special ranking
- SE = Special exempt
- JE = Junior exempt
- JR = Junior Accelerator Programme entrant
- CO = College Accelerator Programme entrant
- NG = Next Gen Accelerator Program entrant
- w/o = Walkover
- r = Retired
- d = Defaulted

=== Finals ===
Semifinals
(United Kingdom) Jack Draper	7^{7}	6
8	(Kazakhstan) Alexander Bublik	6^{2}	4
3	(United States) Sebastian Korda	2	1
7	(Czech Republic) Jiří Lehečka	6	6

Final
(United Kingdom) Jack Draper	6	4	3
7	(Czech Republic) Jiří Lehečka	4	6	6

=== Top half ===
First round
Q	(Australia) A Bolt	6	6
LL	(Brazil) T Seyboth Wild	3	2
(United States) M McDonald	4	2
(Serbia) M Kecmanović	6	6
(United Kingdom) J Draper	6	6
5	(Argentina) S Báez	1	3
(Australia) J Thompson	6	6
Q	(Argentina) F Díaz Acosta	2	2
WC	(Australia) R Hijikata	3	4
(United Kingdom) D Evans	6	6
LL	(Australia) J McCabe	2	3
8	(Kazakhstan) A Bublik	6	6

Second round
1	(United States) T Paul	6	6
Q	(Australia) A Bolt	3	2
(Serbia) M Kecmanović	7	6^{9}	6^{7}
(United Kingdom) J Draper	5	7^{11}	7^{9}
4	(Italy) L Musetti	6	6
(Australia) J Thompson	4	1
(United Kingdom) D Evans	6	2	1
8	(Kazakhstan) A Bublik	4	6	6

Quarterfinals
1	(United States) T Paul	1	4
(United Kingdom) J Draper	6	6
4	(Italy) L Musetti	3	7^{7}	5
8	(Kazakhstan) A Bublik	6	6^{4}	7

Semifinals
(United Kingdom) J Draper	7^{7}	6
8	(Kazakhstan) A Bublik	6^{2}	4

=== Bottom half ===
First round
6	(Argentina) TM Etcheverry	6^{4}	6	5
A Shevchenko	7^{7}	4	7
WC	(Australia) C O'Connell	6	6
Q	(France) A Rinderknech	4	4
(Germany) Y Hanfmann	5	6	6^{9}
(Italy) L Sonego	7	2	7^{11}
7	(Czech Republic) J Lehečka	6	6
Q	(Australia) A Walton	1	3
(Serbia) D Lajović	3	6	6
WC	(Australia) T Kokkinakis	6	1	4
(Italy) M Arnaldi	6	6
LL	(Spain) B Zapata Miralles	4	3

Second round
A Shevchenko	3	1
WC	(Australia) C O'Connell	6	6
(Italy) L Sonego	4	6^{10}
3	(United States) S Korda	6	7^{12}
7	(Czech Republic) J Lehečka	7	4	6
(Serbia) D Lajović	5	6	3
(Italy) M Arnaldi	7^{7}	6^{7}	4
2	(Chile) N Jarry	6^{5}	7^{9}	6

Quarterfinals
WC	(Australia) C O'Connell	4	4
3	(United States) S Korda	6	6
7	(Czech Republic) J Lehečka	6	7
2	(Chile) N Jarry	4	5

Semifinals
3	(United States) S Korda	2	1
7	(Czech Republic) J Lehečka	6	6

== Qualifying ==
=== Seeds ===
1. (United Kingdom) Jack Draper (moved to main draw)
2. (Argentina) Pedro Cachin (first round)
3. (Czech Republic) Tomáš Macháč (first round)
4. (Brazil) Thiago Seyboth Wild (qualifying competition, lucky loser)
5. (Spain) Bernabé Zapata Miralles (qualifying competition, lucky loser)
6. (Peru) Juan Pablo Varillas (first round)
7. (Argentina) Facundo Díaz Acosta (qualified)
8. (France) Arthur Rinderknech (qualified)

=== Qualifiers ===
1. (France) Arthur Rinderknech
2. (Australia) Adam Walton
3. (Australia) Alex Bolt
4. (Argentina) Facundo Díaz Acosta

=== Lucky losers ===
1. (Brazil) Thiago Seyboth Wild
2. (Australia) James McCabe
3. (Spain) Bernabé Zapata Miralles

=== Qualifying draw ===
==== First qualifier ====
First round
Alt	Mikalai Haliak	1	1
(Australia) James McCabe	6	6
WC	(Australia) Jacob Bradshaw	3	4
8	(France) Arthur Rinderknech	6	6

Qualifying competition
(Australia) James McCabe	4	5
8	(France) Arthur Rinderknech	6	7

==== Second qualifier ====
First round
2	(Argentina) Pedro Cachin	5	6^{2}
(Australia) Adam Walton	7	7^{7}
Alt	(Australia) Blake Ellis	3	2
5	(Spain) Bernabé Zapata Miralles	6	6

Qualifying competition
(Australia) Adam Walton	6	6
5	(Spain) Bernabé Zapata Miralles	3	2

==== Third qualifier ====
First round
3	(Czech Republic) Tomáš Macháč	1	1
Alt	(Australia) Alex Bolt	6	6
WC	(Australia) Matthew Dellavedova	6	0	6
6	(Peru) Juan Pablo Varillas	3	6	4

Qualifying competition
Alt	(Australia) Alex Bolt	6	6
WC	(Australia) Matthew Dellavedova	1	4

==== Fourth qualifier ====
First round
4	(Brazil) Thiago Seyboth Wild	1	6	6
Alt	(Australia) Luke Saville	6	3	2
(Japan) Yosuke Watanuki	6	6^{4}	6^{4}
7	(Argentina) Facundo Díaz Acosta	4	7^{7}	7^{7}

Qualifying competition
4	(Brazil) Thiago Seyboth Wild	6	6^{6}	6^{3}
7	(Argentina) Facundo Díaz Acosta	2	7^{8}	7^{7}
