= 2024 Adelaide International – Women's doubles =

Women's doubles
- 2024 Adelaide International

Final
- Champions: (Brazil) Beatriz Haddad Maia (United States) Taylor Townsend
- Runners-up: (France) Caroline Garcia (France) Kristina Mladenovic
- Score: 7–5, 6–3

Events
Singles	men	women
Doubles	men	women
← 2023 ·	Adelaide International	· 2025 →

Beatriz Haddad Maia and Taylor Townsend defeated Caroline Garcia and Kristina Mladenovic in the final, 7–5, 6–3 to win the women's doubles tennis title at the 2024 Adelaide International.

Townsend was the reigning champion in previous year's both editions (first edition with Asia Muhammad and second edition with Luisa Stefani). Muhammad partnered with Demi Schuurs, but lost to Barbora Krejčíková and Laura Siegemund in the second round, while Stefani did not compete this year due to a knee injury.

== Seeds ==
1. (Czech Republic) Barbora Krejčíková / (Germany) Laura Siegemund (semifinals, withdrew)
2. (Canada) Gabriela Dabrowski / (New Zealand) Erin Routliffe (first round)
3. (Brazil) Beatriz Haddad Maia / (United States) Taylor Townsend (champions)
4. (United States) Nicole Melichar-Martinez / (Australia) Ellen Perez (first round)

== Draw ==
=== Key ===
- Q = Qualifier
- WC = Wild card
- LL = Lucky loser
- Alt = Alternate
- SE = Special exempt
- PR = Protected ranking
- ITF = ITF entry
- JE = Junior exempt
- w/o = Walkover
- r = Retired
- d = Defaulted
- SR = Special ranking

=== Draw ===
First round
1	(Czech Republic) B Krejčíková (Germany) L Siegemund	6	7^{7}
(Spain) C Bucșa (Norway) U Eikeri	4	6^{5}
(Romania) A Bogdan (Romania) M Niculescu	6^{2}	4
(United States) A Muhammad (Netherlands) D Schuurs	7^{7}	6
3	(Brazil) B Haddad Maia (United States) T Townsend	7^{7}	6
A Panova (United States) A Parks	6^{4}	1
(Japan) S Aoyama (Serbia) A Krunić	6	5	[13]
(Japan) M Kato (Indonesia) A Sutjiadi	4	7	[11]
WC	(Australia) E Micic (Australia) T Smith	6	6^{4}	[8]
Alt	(Italy) A Moratelli (United Kingdom) S Murray Sharan	3	7^{7}	[10]
(France) C Garcia (France) K Mladenovic	6	6
4	(United States) N Melichar-Martinez (Australia) E Perez	4	4
(Ukraine) L Kichenok (Latvia) J Ostapenko	6	6
(Italy) J Paolini; L Samsonova	4	4
A Sasnovich (Czech Republic) K Siniaková	6	2	[10]
2	(Canada) G Dabrowski (New Zealand) E Routliffe	4	6	[8]

Quarterfinals
1	(Czech Republic) B Krejčíková (Germany) L Siegemund	7	6
(United States) A Muhammad (Netherlands) D Schuurs	5	1
3	(Brazil) B Haddad Maia (United States) T Townsend	7^{9}	6
(Japan) S Aoyama (Serbia) A Krunić	6^{7}	2
Alt	(Italy) A Moratelli (United Kingdom) S Murray Sharan	2	7	[5]
(France) C Garcia (France) K Mladenovic	6	5	[10]
(Ukraine) L Kichenok (Latvia) J Ostapenko	w/o
A Sasnovich (Czech Republic) K Siniaková

Semifinals
1	(Czech Republic) B Krejčíková (Germany) L Siegemund
3	(Brazil) B Haddad Maia (United States) T Townsend	w/o
(France) C Garcia (France) K Mladenovic	w/o
(Ukraine) L Kichenok (Latvia) J Ostapenko

Final
3	(Brazil) B Haddad Maia (United States) T Townsend	7	6
(France) C Garcia (France) K Mladenovic	5	3
