= 2023 Adelaide International 2 – Men's singles =

Men's singles
- 2023 Adelaide International 2

Final
- Champion: (South Korea) Kwon Soon-woo
- Runner-up: (Spain) Roberto Bautista Agut
- Score: 6–4, 3–6, 7–6^{(7–4)}

Details
- Draw: 28
- Seeds: 8

Events
Singles	men	women
Doubles	men	women
← 2023 ·	Adelaide International	· 2024 →

Kwon Soon-woo defeated Roberto Bautista Agut in the final, 6–4, 3–6, 7–6^{(7–4)} to win the men's singles tennis title at the 2023 Adelaide International 2. It was his second ATP Tour singles title, and he became just the tenth man in ATP Tour history to win a title as a lucky loser.

Thanasi Kokkinakis was the defending champion, but lost in the semifinals to Bautista Agut.

== Seeds ==
The top four seeds received a bye into the second round.

1. Andrey Rublev (second round)
2. (Spain) Pablo Carreño Busta (second round)
3. Karen Khachanov (quarterfinals)
4. (Spain) Roberto Bautista Agut (final)
5. (United Kingdom) Dan Evans (first round)
6. (Serbia) Miomir Kecmanović (quarterfinals)
7. (Spain) Alejandro Davidovich Fokina (quarterfinals)
8. (United States) Tommy Paul (second round)

== Draw ==
Key

- Q = Qualifier
- WC = Wild card
- LL = Lucky loser
- Alt = Alternate
- ITF = ITF entry
- PR = Protected ranking
- SR = Special ranking
- SE = Special exempt
- JE = Junior exempt
- JR = Junior Accelerator Programme entrant
- CO = College Accelerator Programme entrant
- NG = Next Gen Accelerator Program entrant
- w/o = Walkover
- r = Retired
- d = Defaulted

=== Finals ===
Semifinals
WC	(Australia) Thanasi Kokkinakis	6^{4}	6	3
4	(Spain) Roberto Bautista Agut	7^{7}	3	6
(United Kingdom) Jack Draper	6^{6}	7^{7}	3
LL	(South Korea) Kwon Soon-woo	7^{8}	6^{2}	6

Final
4	(Spain) Roberto Bautista Agut	4	6	6^{4}
LL	(South Korea) Kwon Soon-woo	6	3	7^{7}

=== Top half ===
First round
WC	(Australia) T Kokkinakis	6	6^{5}	7
WC	(Australia) A Popyrin	0	7^{7}	5
WC	(Australia) J Kubler	7^{7}	7
Q	(Argentina) TM Etcheverry	6^{2}	5
PR	(United Kingdom) K Edmund	4	5
6	(Serbia) M Kecmanović	6	7
(France) B Bonzi	6	6^{8}	6^{3}
LL	(Netherlands) R Haase	3	7^{10}	7^{7}
(Spain) A Ramos Viñolas	6	3	6^{6}
Q	(Australia) J Millman	4	6	7^{8}
(United States) B Nakashima	2	6^{3}
7	(Spain) A Davidovich Fokina	6	7^{7}

Second round
1	A Rublev	4	6	3
WC	(Australia) T Kokkinakis	6	3	6
WC	(Australia) J Kubler	7	6^{1}	4
6	(Serbia) M Kecmanović	5	7^{7}	6
4	(Spain) R Bautista Agut	6	3	6
LL	(Netherlands) R Haase	3	6	3
Q	(Australia) J Millman	3	3
7	(Spain) A Davidovich Fokina	6	6

Quarterfinals
WC	(Australia) T Kokkinakis	6	6^{4}	6
6	(Serbia) M Kecmanović	3	7^{7}	1
4	(Spain) R Bautista Agut	6	6
7	(Spain) A Davidovich Fokina	3	2

Semifinals
WC	(Australia) T Kokkinakis	6^{4}	6	3
4	(Spain) R Bautista Agut	7^{7}	3	6

=== Bottom half ===
First round
8	(United States) T Paul	6	7
LL	(Australia) C O'Connell	4	5
(Italy) L Sonego	4	2
(United Kingdom) J Draper	6	6
(France) A Rinderknech	6	6^{5}	4
(Switzerland) M-A Hüsler	4	7^{7}	6
5	(United Kingdom) D Evans	5	5
(United States) M McDonald	7	7
(Finland) E Ruusuvuori	4	6	3
Q	(Sweden) M Ymer	6	4	6
LL	(South Korea) S-w Kwon	6	6
Q	(Czech Republic) T Macháč	4	4

Second round
8	(United States) T Paul	4	4
(United Kingdom) J Draper	6	6
(Switzerland) M-A Hüsler	4	4
3	K Khachanov	6	6
(United States) M McDonald	6	6^{2}	3
Q	(Sweden) M Ymer	3	7^{7}	6
LL	(South Korea) S-w Kwon	3	6	6
2	(Spain) P Carreño Busta	6	4	4

Quarterfinals
(United Kingdom) J Draper	6	7^{7}
3	K Khachanov	4	6^{3}
Q	(Sweden) M Ymer	1	2
LL	(South Korea) S-w Kwon	6	6

Semifinals
(United Kingdom) J Draper	6^{6}	7^{7}	3
LL	(South Korea) S-w Kwon	7^{8}	6^{2}	6

== Qualifying ==
=== Seeds ===
1. (Colombia) Daniel Elahi Galán (withdrew due to abdominal injury)
2. (Sweden) Mikael Ymer (qualified)
3. (Spain) Bernabé Zapata Miralles (first round)
4. (Germany) Oscar Otte (first round)
5. (Australia) Christopher O'Connell (qualifying competition, lucky loser)
6. (Argentina) Tomás Martín Etcheverry (qualified)
7. (South Korea) Kwon Soon-woo (qualifying competition, lucky loser)
8. (Australia) Jordan Thompson (qualifying competition)

=== Qualifiers ===
1. (Argentina) Tomás Martín Etcheverry
2. (Sweden) Mikael Ymer
3. (Australia) John Millman
4. (Czech Republic) Tomáš Macháč

=== Lucky losers ===
1. (Australia) Christopher O'Connell
2. (South Korea) Kwon Soon-woo
3. (Netherlands) Robin Haase

=== Qualifying draw ===
==== First qualifier ====
First round
Alt	(Netherlands) Robin Haase	6	6
(Hungary) Márton Fucsovics	4	3
WC	(Australia) Luke Saville	1	3
6	(Argentina) Tomás Martín Etcheverry	6	6

Qualifying competition
Alt	(Netherlands) Robin Haase	2	4
6	(Argentina) Tomás Martín Etcheverry	6	6

==== Second qualifier ====
First round
2	(Sweden) Mikael Ymer	6	1
(Georgia (country)) Nikoloz Basilashvili	1	1^{r}
Roman Safiullin	4	4
8	(Australia) Jordan Thompson	6	6

Qualifying competition
2	(Sweden) Mikael Ymer	7^{7}	7
8	(Australia) Jordan Thompson	6^{4}	5

==== Third qualifier ====
First round
3	(Spain) Bernabé Zapata Miralles	2	2
Alt	(Australia) John Millman	6	6
WC	(Australia) Rinky Hijikata	6	1	2
5	(Australia) Christopher O'Connell	3	6	6

Qualifying competition
Alt	(Australia) John Millman	6	7^{9}
5	(Australia) Christopher O'Connell	3	6^{7}

==== Fourth qualifier ====
First round
4	(Germany) Oscar Otte	4	6^{0}
(Czech Republic) Tomáš Macháč	6	7^{7}
(Canada) Vasek Pospisil	7^{9}	3	3
7	(South Korea) Kwon Soon-woo	6^{7}	6	6

Qualifying competition
(Czech Republic) Tomáš Macháč	7	3	6
7	(South Korea) Kwon Soon-woo	5	6	3
