= 2023 Adelaide International 2 – Men's doubles =

Men's doubles
- 2023 Adelaide International 2

Final
- Champions: (El Salvador) Marcelo Arévalo (Netherlands) Jean-Julien Rojer
- Runners-up: (Croatia) Ivan Dodig (United States) Austin Krajicek
- Score: Walkover

Events
Singles	men	women
Doubles	men	women
- Adelaide International

Marcelo Arévalo and Jean-Julien Rojer won the men's doubles tennis title at the 2023 Adelaide International 2 after Ivan Dodig and Austin Krajicek withdrew from the final due to Dodig's injury. Arévalo and Rojer received walkovers in the last two rounds.

Wesley Koolhof and Neal Skupski were the defending champions, but lost in the semifinals to Dodig and Krajicek. Koolhof and Skupski will thus lose the joint ATP no. 1 doubles ranking to Rajeev Ram at the end of the tournament, despite Ram not competing this week.

== Seeds ==
All seeds received a bye into the second round.

1. (Netherlands) Wesley Koolhof / (United Kingdom) Neal Skupski (semifinals)
2. (El Salvador) Marcelo Arévalo / (Netherlands) Jean-Julien Rojer (champions)
3. (Croatia) Ivan Dodig / (United States) Austin Krajicek (final, withdrew)
4. (United Kingdom) Lloyd Glasspool / (Finland) Harri Heliövaara (semifinals, withdrew)
5. (India) Rohan Bopanna / (Australia) Matthew Ebden (second round)
6. (Colombia) Juan Sebastián Cabal / (Colombia) Robert Farah (quarterfinals)
7. (Brazil) Rafael Matos / (Spain) David Vega Hernández (quarterfinals)
8. (Mexico) Santiago González / (France) Édouard Roger-Vasselin (quarterfinals)

== Draw ==
Key

- Q = Qualifier
- WC = Wild card
- LL = Lucky loser
- Alt = Alternate
- ITF = ITF entry
- PR = Protected ranking
- SR = Special ranking
- SE = Special exempt
- JE = Junior exempt
- JR = Junior Accelerator Programme entrant
- CO = College Accelerator Programme entrant
- NG = Next Gen Accelerator Program entrant
- w/o = Walkover
- r = Retired
- d = Defaulted

=== Finals ===
Semifinals
1	(Netherlands) Wesley Koolhof (United Kingdom) Neal Skupski	2	6^{4}
3	(Croatia) Ivan Dodig (United States) Austin Krajicek	6	7^{7}
4	(United Kingdom) Lloyd Glasspool (Finland) Harri Heliövaara
2	(El Salvador) Marcelo Arévalo (Netherlands) Jean-Julien Rojer	w/o

Final
3	(Croatia) Ivan Dodig (United States) Austin Krajicek
2	(El Salvador) Marcelo Arévalo (Netherlands) Jean-Julien Rojer	w/o

=== Top half ===
First round
(Kazakhstan) A Golubev (Kazakhstan) A Nedovyesov	6^{4}	7^{11}	[7]
(Monaco) H Nys (Poland) J Zieliński	7^{7}	6^{9}	[10]
(Sweden) A Göransson (Japan) B McLachlan	6	6
(Colombia) N Barrientos (Uruguay) A Behar	2	4
(Germany) A Mies (Australia) J Peers	7^{7}	3	[10]
(Argentina) G Durán (Austria) P Oswald	6^{2}	6	[6]
WC	(Australia) J Beale (Australia) L Saville	3	6	[10]
(United Kingdom) J Cash (United Kingdom) H Patten	6	3	[5]

Second round
1	(Netherlands) W Koolhof (United Kingdom) N Skupski	6	7^{7}
(Monaco) H Nys (Poland) J Zieliński	3	6^{4}
(Sweden) A Göransson (Japan) B McLachlan	6	5	[8]
8	(Mexico) S González (France) É Roger-Vasselin	2	7	[10]
3	(Croatia) I Dodig (United States) A Krajicek	5	7^{7}	[10]
(Germany) A Mies (Australia) J Peers	7	6^{4}	[3]
WC	(Australia) J Beale (Australia) L Saville	5	6	[7]
7	(Brazil) R Matos (Spain) D Vega Hernández	7	3	[10]

Quarterfinals
1	(Netherlands) W Koolhof (United Kingdom) N Skupski	6^{7}	7^{7}	[10]
8	(Mexico) S González (France) É Roger-Vasselin	7^{9}	6^{5}	[6]
3	(Croatia) I Dodig (United States) A Krajicek	6	6
7	(Brazil) R Matos (Spain) D Vega Hernández	3	4

Semifinals
1	(Netherlands) W Koolhof (United Kingdom) N Skupski	2	6^{4}
3	(Croatia) I Dodig (United States) A Krajicek	6	7^{7}

=== Bottom half ===
First round
(Serbia) N Ćaćić (Pakistan) A-u-H Qureshi	2	2
(France) N Mahut (Germany) T Pütz	6	6
(Bosnia and Herzegovina) T Brkić (Ecuador) G Escobar	4	1
(United States) M McDonald (Brazil) M Melo	6	6
WC	(Australia) B Ellis (Australia) A Harris	6	6
Alt	(Argentina) TM Etcheverry (Ecuador) D Hidalgo	4	4
(Netherlands) R Haase (Netherlands) M Middelkoop	3	6^{4}
(India) R Ramanathan (Mexico) MÁ Reyes-Varela	6	7^{7}

Second round
5	(India) R Bopanna (Australia) M Ebden	6^{4}	5
(France) N Mahut (Germany) T Pütz	7^{7}	7
(United States) M McDonald (Brazil) M Melo	6^{3}	3
4	(United Kingdom) L Glasspool (Finland) H Heliövaara	7^{7}	6
6	(Colombia) JS Cabal (Colombia) R Farah	2	7^{7}	[10]
WC	(Australia) B Ellis (Australia) A Harris	6	6^{4}	[8]
(India) R Ramanathan (Mexico) MÁ Reyes-Varela	3	4
2	(El Salvador) M Arévalo (Netherlands) J-J Rojer	6	6

Quarterfinals
(France) N Mahut (Germany) T Pütz	6^{4}	6	[5]
4	(United Kingdom) L Glasspool (Finland) H Heliövaara	7^{7}	3	[10]
6	(Colombia) JS Cabal (Colombia) R Farah	1	7^{7}	[4]
2	(El Salvador) M Arévalo (Netherlands) J-J Rojer	6	6^{4}	[10]

Semifinals
4	(United Kingdom) L Glasspool (Finland) H Heliövaara
2	(El Salvador) M Arévalo (Netherlands) J-J Rojer	w/o
