= 2023 Adelaide International 2 – Women's singles =

Women's singles
- 2023 Adelaide International 2

Final
- Champion: (Switzerland) Belinda Bencic
- Runner-up: Daria Kasatkina
- Score: 6–0, 6–2

Details
- Draw: 30
- Seeds: 8

Events
Singles	men	women
Doubles	men	women
← 2023 ·	Adelaide International	· 2024 →

Belinda Bencic defeated Daria Kasatkina in the final, 6–0, 6–2 to win the women's singles tennis title at the 2023 Adelaide International 2.

Madison Keys was the reigning champion from 2022, when the event was a WTA 250 tournament, but withdrew after competing at the United Cup.

For the first time since the 2017 Bank of the West Classic, all seeded players reached the quarterfinals.

== Seeds ==
The top two seeds who did not withdraw received a bye into the second round.

1. (Poland) Iga Świątek (withdrew)
2. (Tunisia) Ons Jabeur (withdrew)
3. (United States) Jessica Pegula (withdrew)
4. (France) Caroline Garcia (quarterfinals)
5. Daria Kasatkina (final)
6. Veronika Kudermetova (semifinals, withdrew)
7. (United States) Madison Keys (withdrew)
8. (Switzerland) Belinda Bencic (champion)
9. (Spain) Paula Badosa (semifinals, withdrew)
10. (United States) Danielle Collins (quarterfinals)
11. (Brazil) Beatriz Haddad Maia (quarterfinals)
12. (Czech Republic) Petra Kvitová (quarterfinals)

== Draw ==
=== Key ===
- Q = Qualifier
- WC = Wild card
- LL = Lucky loser
- Alt = Alternate
- SE = Special exempt
- PR = Protected ranking
- ITF = ITF entry
- JE = Junior exempt
- w/o = Walkover
- r = Retired
- d = Defaulted
- SR = Special ranking

=== Finals ===
Semifinals
8	(Switzerland) Belinda Bencic	w/o
6	Veronika Kudermetova
9	(Spain) Paula Badosa
5	Daria Kasatkina	w/o

Final
8	(Switzerland) Belinda Bencic	6	6
5	Daria Kasatkina	0	2

=== Top half ===
First round
LL	A Potapova	1	0^{r}
Q	(Czech Republic) K Siniaková	6	1
(Latvia) J Ostapenko	3	4
Q	A Kalinskaya	6	6
WC	(Spain) G Muguruza	3	4
8	(Switzerland) B Bencic	6	6
10	(United States) D Collins	6	6
Q	(Czech Republic) Ka Plíšková	2	4
PR	A Pavlyuchenkova	5	4
Q	(Switzerland) J Teichmann	7	6
WC	(Australia) J Fourlis	5	3
E Alexandrova	7	6
WC	V Azarenka	6	6^{4}	4
6	V Kudermetova	2	7^{7}	6

Second round
4	(France) C Garcia	6	3	7
Q	(Czech Republic) K Siniaková	3	6	5
Q	A Kalinskaya	3	3
8	(Switzerland) B Bencic	6	6
10	(United States) D Collins	6	7^{7}
Q	(Switzerland) J Teichmann	3	6^{2}
E Alexandrova
6	V Kudermetova	w/o

Quarterfinals
4	(France) C Garcia	2	6	4
8	(Switzerland) B Bencic	6	3	6
10	(United States) D Collins	6	6^{5}	1
6	V Kudermetova	4	7^{7}	6

Semifinals
8	(Switzerland) B Bencic	w/o
6	V Kudermetova

=== Bottom half ===
First round
11	(Brazil) B Haddad Maia	7^{7}	6
Q	(Romania) S Cîrstea	6^{5}	1
LL	(United States) A Anisimova	7	6
L Samsonova	5	3
LL	(Estonia) K Kanepi	6	6
WC	(Australia) S Hunter	2	2
(Estonia) A Kontaveit	4	3
9	(Spain) P Badosa	6	6
12	(Czech Republic) P Kvitová	6	7
(Kazakhstan) E Rybakina	3	5
Q	(China) Q Zheng	4	6	6
LL	(United States) S Rogers	6	4	0
LL	(United States) A Riske-Amritraj	2	6^{3}
(Czech Republic) B Krejčíková	6	7^{7}

Second round
11	(Brazil) B Haddad Maia	6	7
LL	(United States) A Anisimova	4	5
LL	(Estonia) K Kanepi	1	5
9	(Spain) P Badosa	6	7
12	(Czech Republic) P Kvitová	7^{8}	0
Q	(China) Q Zheng	6^{6}	0^{r}
(Czech Republic) B Krejčíková	2	5
5	D Kasatkina	6	7

Quarterfinals
11	(Brazil) B Haddad Maia	6^{5}	5
9	(Spain) P Badosa	7^{7}	7
12	(Czech Republic) P Kvitová	3	6^{3}
5	D Kasatkina	6	7^{7}

Semifinals
9	(Spain) P Badosa
5	D Kasatkina	w/o

== Qualifying ==
=== Seeds ===
1. (United States) Amanda Anisimova (qualifying competition, lucky loser)
2. (China) Zhang Shuai (first round)
3. (China) Zheng Qinwen (qualified)
4. Aliaksandra Sasnovich (first round)
5. (Czech Republic) Karolína Plíšková (qualified)
6. (Estonia) Kaia Kanepi (qualifying competition, lucky loser)
7. (Switzerland) Jil Teichmann (qualified)
8. (United States) Alison Riske-Amritraj (qualifying competition, lucky loser)
9. Anastasia Potapova (qualifying competition, lucky loser)
10. (Romania) Sorana Cîrstea (qualified)
11. (United States) Shelby Rogers (qualifying competition, lucky loser)
12. (Czech Republic) Kateřina Siniaková (qualified)

=== Qualifiers ===
1. (Switzerland) Jil Teichmann
2. (Czech Republic) Kateřina Siniaková
3. (China) Zheng Qinwen
4. Anna Kalinskaya
5. (Czech Republic) Karolína Plíšková
6. (Romania) Sorana Cîrstea

=== Lucky losers ===
1. (United States) Amanda Anisimova
2. (United States) Alison Riske-Amritraj
3. Anastasia Potapova
4. (United States) Shelby Rogers
5. (Estonia) Kaia Kanepi

=== Qualifying draw ===
==== First qualifier ====
First round
1	(United States) Amanda Anisimova	6	1	6
PR	(United States) Taylor Townsend	3	6	3
WC	(Australia) Olivia Tjandramulia	1	0
7	(Switzerland) Jil Teichmann	6	6

Qualifying competition
1	(United States) Amanda Anisimova	6^{4}	6	1
7	(Switzerland) Jil Teichmann	7^{7}	4	6

==== Second qualifier ====
First round
2	(China) Zhang Shuai	6^{5}	4
(Romania) Ana Bogdan	7^{7}	6
WC	(Australia) Alexandra Osborne	0	4
12	(Czech Republic) Kateřina Siniaková	6	6

Qualifying competition
(Romania) Ana Bogdan	7^{7}	5	5
12	(Czech Republic) Kateřina Siniaková	6^{5}	7	7

==== Third qualifier ====
First round
3	(China) Zheng Qinwen	6	6
WC	(Australia) Mia Repac	0	0
(Hungary) Dalma Gálfi	6	5	0^{r}
9	Anastasia Potapova	3	7	1

Qualifying competition
3	(China) Zheng Qinwen	6^{3}	7	7^{7}
9	Anastasia Potapova	7^{7}	5	6^{4}

==== Fourth qualifier ====
First round
4	Aliaksandra Sasnovich	6	2	6^{2}
Anna Kalinskaya	2	6	7^{7}
WC	(Australia) Alana Parnaby	3	1
8	(United States) Alison Riske-Amritraj	6	6

Qualifying competition
Anna Kalinskaya	6	7
8	(United States) Alison Riske-Amritraj	3	5

==== Fifth qualifier ====
First round
5	(Czech Republic) Karolína Plíšková	6	6
(Germany) Jule Niemeier	4	3
(Ukraine) Marta Kostyuk	3	3
11	(United States) Shelby Rogers	6	6

Qualifying competition
5	(Czech Republic) Karolína Plíšková	6	6
11	(United States) Shelby Rogers	4	3

==== Sixth qualifier ====
First round
6	(Estonia) Kaia Kanepi	6	7^{7}
(Hungary) Anna Bondár	1	6^{5}
(Italy) Camila Giorgi	7	4	0
10	(Romania) Sorana Cîrstea	5	6	6

Qualifying competition
6	(Estonia) Kaia Kanepi	2	6	5
10	(Romania) Sorana Cîrstea	6	4	7
