= 2023 Adelaide International 2 =

Tennis tournament on the 2023 WTA Tour

- Date: 9–14 January
- Edition: 3rd (ATP); 4th (WTA)
- Category: ATP Tour 250; WTA 500
- Draw: 28S / 24D (ATP); 30S / 16D (WTA)
- Prize money: $642,735 (ATP) $780,637 (WTA)
- Surface: Hard / outdoor
- Location: Adelaide, Australia
- Venue: Memorial Drive Tennis Centre

Champions

Men's singles
- (South Korea) Kwon Soon-woo

Women's singles
- (Switzerland) Belinda Bencic

Men's doubles
- (El Salvador) Marcelo Arévalo / (Netherlands) Jean-Julien Rojer

Women's doubles
- (Brazil) Luisa Stefani / (United States) Taylor Townsend
← 2023 ·	Adelaide International	· 2024 →

The 2023 Adelaide International 2 was a tennis tournament on the 2023 ATP Tour and 2023 WTA Tour. It was a combined ATP Tour 250 and WTA 500 tournament played on outdoor hard courts in Adelaide, South Australia, Australia.

This was the fourth edition of the tournament for the women and the third edition for the men. The tournament took place at the Memorial Drive Tennis Centre from 9–14 January 2023 and it followed from a week before the 2023 Adelaide International 1, a combined ATP Tour 250 and WTA 500 tournament, at the same venue.

== Finals ==
=== Men's singles ===
- (South Korea) Kwon Soon-woo def. (Spain) Roberto Bautista Agut, 6–4, 3–6, 7–6^{(7–4)}
- It was Soon-woo's 1st title of the year and the 2nd of his career.

=== Men's doubles ===
- (El Salvador) Marcelo Arévalo / (Netherlands) Jean-Julien Rojer def. (Croatia) Ivan Dodig / (United States) Austin Krajicek by walkover

=== Women's singles ===
- (Switzerland) Belinda Bencic def. Daria Kasatkina 6–0, 6–2

=== Women's doubles ===
- (Brazil) Luisa Stefani / (United States) Taylor Townsend def. Anastasia Pavlyuchenkova / (Kazakhstan) Elena Rybakina 7–5, 7–6^{(7–3)}

== Points and prize money ==
=== Points distribution ===
Event	W	F	SF	QF	Round of 16	Round of 32	Q	Q2	Q1
Men's singles	250	150	90	45	20	0	12	6	0
Men's doubles	250	150	90	45	20	0	—	—	—
Women's singles	470	305	185	100	55	1	25	13	1
Women's doubles	470	305	185	100	1	—	—	—	—

_{*per team}

=== Prize money ===
Event	W	F	SF	QF	Round of 16	Round of 32	Q2	Q1
Men's singles	$97,760	$57,025	$33,525	$19,425	$11,280	$6,895	$3,445	$1,880
Men's doubles *	$33,580	$17,550	$9,260	$5,140	$2,820	$1,570	—	—
Women's singles	$120,150	$74,161	$43,323	$20,465	$11,145	$7,500	$5,590	$2,860
Women's doubles*	$40,100	$24,300	$13,900	$7,200	$5,750	$4,350	—	—
Doubles prize money per team

== ATP singles main draw entrants ==
=== Seeds ===
Country	Player	Rank^{†}	Seed
	Andrey Rublev	8	1
ESP	Pablo Carreño Busta	13	2
	Karen Khachanov	20	3
ESP	Roberto Bautista Agut	21	4
GBR	Dan Evans	27	5
SRB	Miomir Kecmanović	29	6
ESP	Alejandro Davidovich Fokina	31	7
USA	Tommy Paul	32	8

† Rankings are as of 2 January 2023

=== Other entrants ===
The following players received wildcard entry into the singles main draw:

- (Australia) Thanasi Kokkinakis
- (Australia) Jason Kubler
- (Australia) Alexei Popyrin

The following player received entry using a protected ranking into the singles main draw:

- (United Kingdom) Kyle Edmund

The following players received entry from the qualifying draw:

- (Argentina) Tomás Martín Etcheverry
- (Czech Republic) Tomáš Macháč
- (Australia) John Millman
- (Sweden) Mikael Ymer

The following players received entry as lucky losers:

- (Netherlands) Robin Haase
- (South Korea) Kwon Soon-woo
- (Australia) Christopher O'Connell

=== Withdrawals ===
- (United States) Maxime Cressy → replaced by (Netherlands) Robin Haase
- (United States) Sebastian Korda → replaced by (Australia) Christopher O'Connell
- (Australia) Nick Kyrgios → replaced by (United Kingdom) Kyle Edmund
- (Italy) Lorenzo Musetti → replaced by (United States) Mackenzie McDonald
- (Japan) Yoshihito Nishioka → replaced by (South Korea) Kwon Soon-woo

== ATP doubles main draw entrants ==
=== Seeds ===
Country	Player	Country	Player	Rank^{†}	Seed
NED	Wesley Koolhof	GBR	Neal Skupski	2	1
ESA	Marcelo Arévalo	NED	Jean-Julien Rojer	12	2
CRO	Ivan Dodig	USA	Austin Krajicek	19	3
GBR	Lloyd Glasspool	FIN	Harri Heliövaara	23	4
IND	Rohan Bopanna	AUS	Matthew Ebden	45	5
COL	Juan Sebastián Cabal	COL	Robert Farah	58	6
BRA	Rafael Matos	ESP	David Vega Hernández	58	7
MEX	Santiago González	FRA	Édouard Roger-Vasselin	60	8

† Rankings are as of 2 January 2023

=== Other entrants ===
The following pairs received wildcards into the doubles main draw:

- (Australia) Jeremy Beale / (Australia) Luke Saville
- (Australia) Blake Ellis / (Australia) Andrew Harris

The following pair received entry as alternates:

- (Argentina) Tomás Martín Etcheverry / (Ecuador) Diego Hidalgo

=== Withdrawals ===
- (United States) Maxime Cressy / (France) Albano Olivetti → replaced by (Argentina) Tomás Martín Etcheverry / (Ecuador) Diego Hidalgo

== WTA singles main draw entrants ==
=== Seeds ===
Country	Player	Rank^{†}	Seed
~~POL~~	~~Iga Świątek~~	~~1~~	~~1~~
~~TUN~~	~~Ons Jabeur~~	~~2~~	~~2~~
~~USA~~	~~Jessica Pegula~~	~~3~~	~~3~~
FRA	Caroline Garcia	4	4
	Daria Kasatkina	8	5
	Veronika Kudermetova	9	6
~~USA~~	~~Madison Keys~~	~~11~~	~~7~~
SUI	Belinda Bencic	12	8
ESP	Paula Badosa	13	9
USA	Danielle Collins	14	10
BRA	Beatriz Haddad Maia	15	11
CZE	Petra Kvitová	16	12

† Rankings are as of 2 January 2023

=== Other entrants ===
The following players received wildcard entry into the singles main draw:

- Victoria Azarenka
- (Australia) Jaimee Fourlis
- (Australia) Storm Hunter
- (Spain) Garbiñe Muguruza

The following player received entry using a protected ranking into the singles main draw:

- Anastasia Pavlyuchenkova

The following player received entry using a special exempt:

- ~~(Romania) Irina-Camelia Begu~~

The following players received entry from the qualifying draw:

- (Romania) Sorana Cîrstea
- Anna Kalinskaya
- (Czech Republic) Karolína Plíšková
- (Czech Republic) Kateřina Siniaková
- (Switzerland) Jil Teichmann
- (China) Zheng Qinwen

The following players received entry as lucky losers:

- (United States) Amanda Anisimova
- (Estonia) Kaia Kanepi
- Anastasia Potapova
- (United States) Alison Riske-Amritraj
- (United States) Shelby Rogers

=== Withdrawals ===
- (Romania) Irina-Camelia Begu → replaced by (Estonia) Kaia Kanepi
- (Tunisia) Ons Jabeur → replaced by (United States) Shelby Rogers
- (United States) Madison Keys → replaced by (United States) Alison Riske-Amritraj
- (United States) Jessica Pegula → replaced by (United States) Amanda Anisimova
- (Poland) Iga Świątek → replaced by Anastasia Potapova

== WTA doubles main draw entrants ==
=== Seeds ===
Country	Player	Country	Player	Rank^{1}	Seed
AUS	Storm Hunter	CZE	Barbora Krejčiková	13	1
CAN	Gabriela Dabrowski	MEX	Giuliana Olmos	15	2
UKR	Lyudmyla Kichenok	LAT	Jeļena Ostapenko	23	3
USA	Desirae Krawczyk	NED	Demi Schuurs	34	4

- ^{1} Rankings as of 2 January 2023.

=== Other entrants ===
The following pair received a wildcard into the doubles main draw:

- (Australia) Alana Parnaby / (Australia) Olivia Tjandramulia

=== Withdrawals ===
- (United States) Coco Gauff / (United States) Jessica Pegula
- (United States) Caty McNally / (Brazil) Luisa Stefani → replaced by (Brazil) Luisa Stefani / (United States) Taylor Townsend
