= 2023 Adelaide International 2 – Women's doubles =

Women's doubles
- 2023 Adelaide International 2

Final
- Champions: (Brazil) Luisa Stefani (United States) Taylor Townsend
- Runners-up: Anastasia Pavlyuchenkova (Kazakhstan) Elena Rybakina
- Score: 7–5, 7–6^{(7–3)}

Events
| Singles | men | women |
| Doubles | men | women |
| ← 2022 · | Adelaide International | · 2024 → |

Luisa Stefani and Taylor Townsend defeated Anastasia Pavlyuchenkova and Elena Rybakina in the final, 7–5, 7–6^{(7–3)}, to win the women's doubles tennis title at the 2023 Adelaide International 2. It was their first title as a team.

Eri Hozumi and Makoto Ninomiya were the reigning champions from 2022, when the event was a WTA 250 tournament, but chose to compete in Hobart instead.

== Seeds ==
1. (Australia) Storm Hunter / (Czech Republic) Barbora Krejčíková (quarterfinals)
2. (Canada) Gabriela Dabrowski / (Mexico) Giuliana Olmos (first round)
3. (Ukraine) Lyudmyla Kichenok / (Latvia) Jeļena Ostapenko (semifinals)
4. (United States) Desirae Krawczyk / (Netherlands) Demi Schuurs (quarterfinals)

== Draw ==
=== Key ===
- Q = Qualifier
- WC = Wild card
- LL = Lucky loser
- Alt = Alternate
- SE = Special exempt
- PR = Protected ranking
- ITF = ITF entry
- JE = Junior exempt
- w/o = Walkover
- r = Retired
- d = Defaulted
- SR = Special ranking

=== Draw ===
First round
1 | (Australia) S Hunter (Czech Republic) B Krejčíková | 3 | 6 | [10]
(Kazakhstan) A Danilina (India) S Mirza | 6 | 3 | [6]
(Chinese Taipei) H-c Chan (China) Z Yang | 5 | 5
(Czech Republic) M Kolodziejová (Czech Republic) M Vondroušová | 7 | 7
4 | (United States) D Krawczyk (Netherlands) D Schuurs | 7 | 6
(Japan) S Aoyama (Japan) E Shibahara | 5 | 4
(Brazil) L Stefani (United States) T Townsend | 7^{7} | 3 | [10]
(Brazil) B Haddad Maia (China) S Zhang | 6^{4} | 6 | [2]
(Poland) A Rosolska (New Zealand) E Routliffe | 6 | 6
WC | (Australia) A Parnaby (Australia) O Tjandramulia | 3 | 4
(Georgia (country)) O Kalashnikova (Ukraine) M Kostyuk | 0 | 1
3 | (Ukraine) L Kichenok (Latvia) J Ostapenko | 6 | 6
A Pavlyuchenkova (Kazakhstan) E Rybakina | 7^{7} | 6
(Romania) A Bogdan; A Gabueva | 6^{5} | 2
(United States) N Melichar-Martinez (Australia) S Stosur | 6 | 6
2 | (Canada) G Dabrowski (Mexico) G Olmos | 1 | 4

Quarterfinals
1 | (Australia) S Hunter (Czech Republic) B Krejčíková | 6 | 4 | [8]
(Czech Republic) M Kolodziejová (Czech Republic) M Vondroušová | 4 | 6 | [10]
4 | (United States) D Krawczyk (Netherlands) D Schuurs | 3 | 6 | [7]
(Brazil) L Stefani (United States) T Townsend | 6 | 4 | [10]
(Poland) A Rosolska (New Zealand) E Routliffe | 3 | 4
3 | (Ukraine) L Kichenok (Latvia) J Ostapenko | 6 | 6
A Pavlyuchenkova (Kazakhstan) E Rybakina | 6 | 6
(United States) N Melichar-Martinez (Australia) S Stosur | 3 | 3

Semifinals
(Czech Republic) M Kolodziejová (Czech Republic) M Vondroušová | 2 | 3
(Brazil) L Stefani (United States) T Townsend | 6 | 6
3 | (Ukraine) L Kichenok (Latvia) J Ostapenko | 4 | 5
A Pavlyuchenkova (Kazakhstan) E Rybakina | 6 | 7

Final
(Brazil) L Stefani (United States) T Townsend | 7 | 7^{7}
A Pavlyuchenkova (Kazakhstan) E Rybakina | 5 | 6^{3}
