= Adelaide International (tennis) =

Tennis tournament in South Australia

- 2026 Adelaide International

Tournament information
- Event name: Adelaide International
- Founded: 2020; 6 years ago
- Location: Adelaide, SA
- Venue: Memorial Drive Tennis Centre
- Surface: Hard (Greenset)
- Website: adelaideinternational.com.au

Current champions (2026)
- Men's singles: (Czech Republic) Tomáš Macháč
- Women's singles: Mirra Andreeva
- Men's doubles: (Italy) Simone Bolelli (Italy) Andrea Vavassori
- Women's doubles: (Czech Republic) Kateřina Siniaková (China) Zhang Shuai
ATP Tour
- Category: ATP 250
- Draw: 28S / 16Q / 24D
- Prize money: US$766,290 (2025)
WTA Tour
- Category: WTA 500
- Draw: 30S / 24Q / 16D
- Prize money: US$1,206,446 (2026)

The Adelaide International is a professional tennis tournament played on outdoor hard courts in Adelaide, South Australia, at the Memorial Drive Tennis Centre. The tournament is held in January or February, and forms part of the WTA and ATP tours. The event is part of the lead-up to the first Grand Slam tournament of the season, the Australian Open.

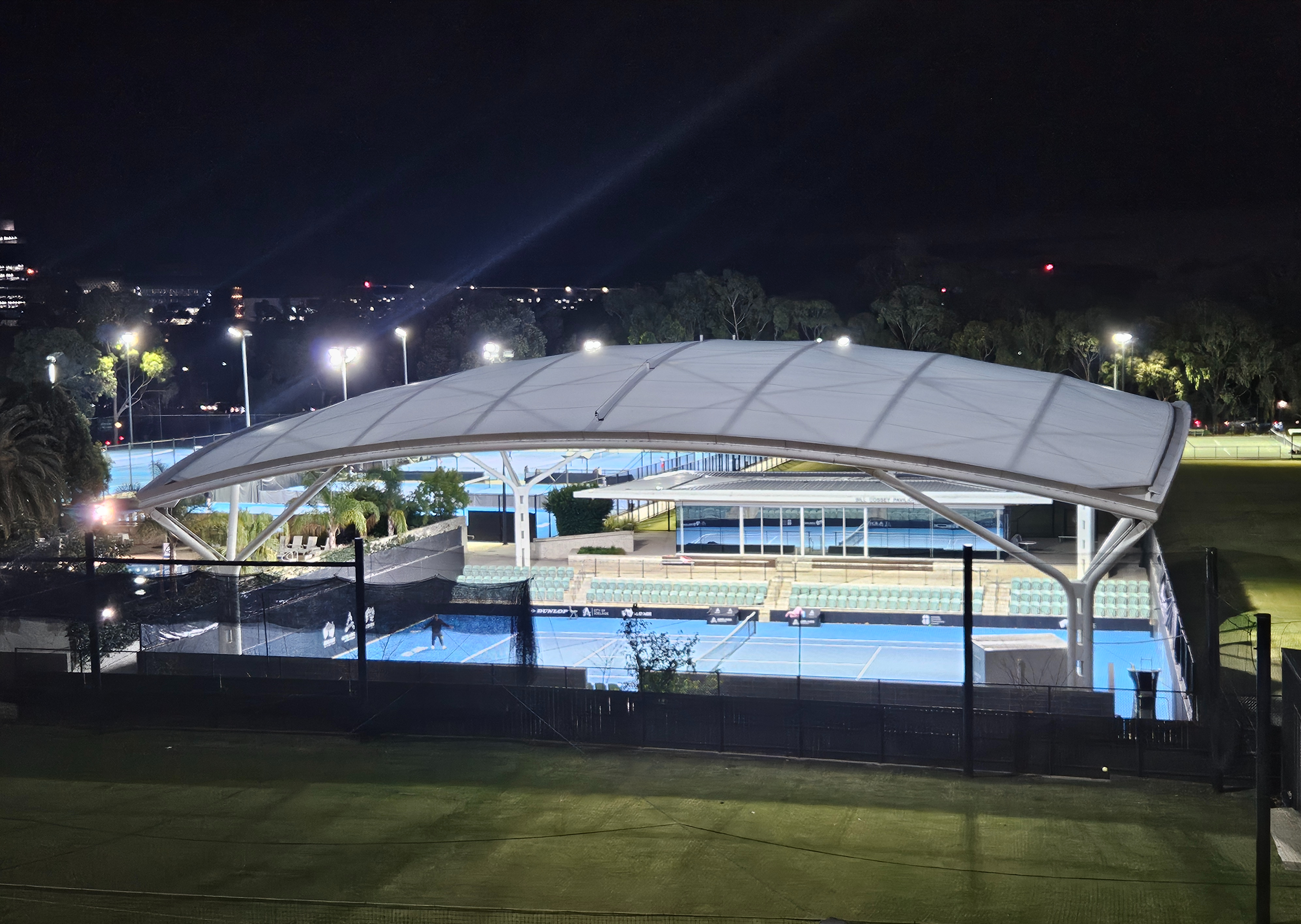
Memorial Drive's tennis courts in 2025

== History ==
The establishment of the Brisbane International in 2009 saw the city of Adelaide miss out on continuing to host an ATP or WTA lead-up event to the Australian Open. Over the next ten years Adelaide hosted the World Tennis Challenge, an exhibition event played featuring past players. The unveiling of the multi-city ATP Cup competition, held around the same time, resulted in the abolition of the Hopman Cup and the condensing of other tournaments, thereby allowing sufficient room in the calendar for the Adelaide International. In February 2019, the South Australian Government announced it would invest $10 million to construct a canopy-roof structure over the Memorial Drive Tennis Centre, after securing a five-year deal with Tennis Australia to host the new event at the upgraded facility. The new tournament was announced later that year, with then-world number four and two-time Grand-Slam champion Simona Halep being confirmed as the first player to play in the 2020 Adelaide International. The new international tournament was a combined WTA Premier and ATP 250 event.

In 2021, a WTA-only tournament was held after the Australian Open, from February 22–27.

In 2022, there were two back-to-back Adelaide Internationals from January 1st to January 14th. The events were combined ATP 250 and WTA 250 tournaments with Gaël Monfils and Ashleigh Barty winning the men's and women's singles in the first tournament, and Thanasi Kokkinakis and Madison Keys winning the men's and women's singles in the second tournament.

== Finals ==
=== Men's singles ===
Year	Champions	Runners-up	Score
2020	(Russia) Andrey Rublev	(South Africa) Lloyd Harris	6–3, 6–0
2021	Not held		
2022 (1)	(France) Gaël Monfils	(Russia) Karen Khachanov	6–4, 6–4
2022 (2)	(Australia) Thanasi Kokkinakis	(France) Arthur Rinderknech	6–7^{(6–8)}, 7–6^{(7–5)}, 6–3
2023 (1)	(Serbia) Novak Djokovic	(United States) Sebastian Korda	6–7^{(8–10)}, 7–6^{(7–3)}, 6–4
2023 (2)	(South Korea) Kwon Soon-woo	(Spain) Roberto Bautista Agut	6–4, 3–6, 7–6^{(7–4)}
2024	(Czech Republic) Jiří Lehečka	(United Kingdom) Jack Draper	4–6, 6–4, 6–3
2025	(Canada) Félix Auger-Aliassime	(United States) Sebastian Korda	6–3, 3–6, 6–1
2026	(Czech Republic) Tomáš Macháč	(France) Ugo Humbert	6-4, 6-7^{(2–7)}, 6-2

=== Women's singles ===
Year	Champions	Runners-up	Score
2020	(Australia) Ashleigh Barty	(Ukraine) Dayana Yastremska	6–2, 7–5
2021	(Poland) Iga Świątek	(Switzerland) Belinda Bencic	6–2, 6–2
2022 (1)	(Australia) Ashleigh Barty (2)	(Kazakhstan) Elena Rybakina	6–3, 6–2
2022 (2)	(United States) Madison Keys	(United States) Alison Riske	6–1, 6–2
2023 (1)	Aryna Sabalenka	(Czech Republic) Linda Nosková	6–3, 7–6^{(7–4)}
2023 (2)	(Switzerland) Belinda Bencic	Daria Kasatkina	6–0, 6–2
2024	(Latvia) Jeļena Ostapenko	Daria Kasatkina	6–3, 6–2
2025	(United States) Madison Keys (2)	(United States) Jessica Pegula	6–3, 4–6, 6–1
2026	Mirra Andreeva	(Canada) Victoria Mboko	6–3, 6–1

=== Men's doubles ===
Year	Champions	Runners-up	Score
2020	(Argentina) Máximo González (France) Fabrice Martin	(Croatia) Ivan Dodig (Slovakia) Filip Polášek	7–6^{(14–12)}, 6–3
2021	Not held		
2022 (1)	(India) Rohan Bopanna (India) Ramkumar Ramanathan	(Croatia) Ivan Dodig (Brazil) Marcelo Melo	7–6^{(8–6)}, 6–1
2022 (2)	(Netherlands) Wesley Koolhof (United Kingdom) Neal Skupski	(Uruguay) Ariel Behar (Ecuador) Gonzalo Escobar	7–6^{(7–5)}, 6–4
2023 (1)	(United Kingdom) Lloyd Glasspool (Finland) Harri Heliövaara	(United Kingdom) Jamie Murray (New Zealand) Michael Venus	6–3, 7–6^{(7–3)}
2023 (2)	(El Salvador) Marcelo Arévalo (Netherlands) Jean-Julien Rojer	(Croatia) Ivan Dodig (United States) Austin Krajicek	Walkover
2024	(United States) Rajeev Ram (United Kingdom) Joe Salisbury	(India) Rohan Bopanna (Australia) Matthew Ebden	7–5, 5–7, [11–9]
2025	(Italy) Simone Bolelli (Italy) Andrea Vavassori	(Germany) Kevin Krawietz (Germany) Tim Pütz	4–6, 7–6^{(7–4)}, [11–9]
2026	(Finland) Harri Heliövaara (United Kingdom) Henry Patten	(Germany) Kevin Krawietz (Germany) Tim Pütz	6-3, 6-2

=== Women's doubles ===
Year	Champions	Runners-up	Score
2020	(United States) Nicole Melichar (China) Xu Yifan	(Canada) Gabriela Dabrowski (Croatia) Darija Jurak	2–6, 7–5, [10–5]
2021	(Chile) Alexa Guarachi (United States) Desirae Krawczyk	(United States) Hayley Carter (Brazil) Luisa Stefani	6–7^{(4–7)}, 6–4, [10–3]
2022 (1)	(Australia) Ashleigh Barty (Australia) Storm Sanders	(Croatia) Darija Jurak Schreiber (Slovenia) Andreja Klepač	6–1, 6–4
2022 (2)	(Japan) Eri Hozumi (Japan) Makoto Ninomiya	(Czech Republic) Tereza Martincová (Czech Republic) Markéta Vondroušová	1–6, 7–6^{(7–4)}, [10–7]
2023 (1)	(United States) Asia Muhammad (United States) Taylor Townsend	(Australia) Storm Hunter (Czech Republic) Kateřina Siniaková	6–2, 7–6^{(7–2)}
2023 (2)	(Brazil) Luisa Stefani (United States) Taylor Townsend (2)	Anastasia Pavlyuchenkova (Kazakhstan) Elena Rybakina	7–5, 7–6^{(7–3)}
2024	(Brazil) Beatriz Haddad Maia (United States) Taylor Townsend (3)	(France) Caroline Garcia (France) Kristina Mladenovic	7–5, 6–3
2025	(China) Guo Hanyu; Alexandra Panova	(Brazil) Beatriz Haddad Maia (Germany) Laura Siegemund	7–5, 6–4
2026	(Czech Republic) Kateřina Siniaková (China) Zhang Shuai	(Ukraine) Lyudmyla Kichenok (United States) Desirae Krawczyk	6–1, 6–4

== See also ==
- South Australian Championships
- Australian Hard Court Championships
- Australian Open Series
