= Victoria Mboko career statistics =

Statistics of Canadian tennis player

Career finals
Discipline	Type	Won	Lost	Total
Singles	Grand Slam	–	–	0
Singles	WTA Finals	–	–	0
Singles	WTA 1000	1	1	2
Singles	WTA 500	–	2	2
Singles	WTA 250	1	–	1
Singles	Olympics	–	–	0
Singles	Total	2	3	5
Doubles	Grand Slam	–	–	0
Doubles	WTA Finals	–	–	0
Doubles	WTA 1000	–	–	0
Doubles	WTA 500	–	–	0
Doubles	WTA 250	–	–	0
Doubles	Olympics	–	–	0
Doubles	Total	2	0	0

This is a list of career statistics of Canadian tennis player Victoria Mboko since her professional debut in 2021. Mboko has won two singles WTA titles.

== Performance timeline ==
Key
W	F	SF	QF	#R	RR	Q#	P#	DNQ	A	Z#	PO	G	S	B	NMS	NTI	P	NH

(W) winner; (F) finalist; (SF) semifinalist; (QF) quarterfinalist; (#R) rounds 4, 3, 2, 1; (RR) round-robin stage; (Q#) qualification round; (P#) preliminary round; (DNQ) did not qualify; (A) absent; (Z#) Davis/Fed Cup Zonal Group (with number indication) or (PO) play-off; (G) gold, (S) silver or (B) bronze Olympic/Paralympic medal; (NMS) not a Masters tournament; (NTI) not a Tier I tournament; (P) postponed; (NH) not held; (SR) strike rate (events won / competed); (W–L) win–loss record.
To avoid confusion and double counting, these charts are updated at the conclusion of a tournament or when the player's participation has ended.

Only main-draw results in WTA Tour, Grand Slam tournaments, Billie Jean King Cup, United Cup, Hopman Cup and Olympic Games are included in win–loss records.

=== Singles ===
Current through the 2026 French Open.

Tournament	2022	2023	2024	2025	2026	SR	W–L	Win %
Grand Slam tournaments
Australian Open	A	A	A	A	4R	0 / 1	3–1	
French Open	A	A	A	3R	3R	0 / 2	4–2	
Wimbledon	A	A	A	2R	A	0 / 1	1–1	
US Open	A	A	A	1R		0 / 1	0–1	
Win–loss	0–0	0–0	0–0	3–3	5–2	0 / 5	8–5	
National representation
Billie Jean King Cup	A	A	A	QR		0 / 0	4–0	
WTA 1000 tournaments
Qatar Open	A	NTI	A	A	F	0 / 1	5–1	
Dubai Championships	NTI	A	A	A	A	0 / 0	0–0	
Indian Wells Open	A	A	A	A	QF	0 / 1	3–1	
Miami Open	A	A	A	2R	QF	0 / 2	4–2	
Madrid Open	A	A	A	A	1R	0 / 1	0–1	
Italian Open	A	A	A	2R	A	0 / 1	1–1	
Canadian Open	Q1	A	A	W	A	1 / 1	7–0	
Cincinnati Open	A	A	A	A		0 / 0	0–0	
China Open	NH	A	A	2R		0 / 1	0–1	
Wuhan Open	NH		A	1R		0 / 1	0–1	
Win–Loss	0–0	0–0	0–0	9–4	11–4	1 / 9	20–8	
Career statistics
Tournaments	1	0	0	12	10	Career total: 23		
Titles	0	0	0	2	0	Career total: 2		
Finals	0	0	0	2	3	Career total: 5		
Overall win–loss	0–1	0–0	0–0	24–10	24–10	2 / 23	48–21	
Year-end ranking	499	323	350	18				

== WTA 1000 tournament finals ==
=== Singles: 2 (1 title, 1 runner-up) ===
Result	Year	Tournament	Surface	Opponent	Score
Win	2025	Canadian Open	Hard	(Japan) Naomi Osaka	2–6, 6–4, 6–1
Loss	2026	Qatar Open	Hard	(Czech Republic) Karolína Muchová	4–6, 5–7

== WTA Tour finals ==
=== Singles: 5 (2 titles, 3 runner-ups) ===
Legend WTA 1000 (1–1) WTA 500 (0–2) WTA 250 (1–0)	Finals by surface Hard (2–2) Clay (0–1)	Finals by setting Outdoor (2–3)

Result	W–L	Date	Tournament	Tier	Surface	Opponent	Score
Win	1–0	Aug 2025	Canadian Open, Canada	WTA 1000	Hard	(Japan) Naomi Osaka	2–6, 6–4, 6–1
Win	2–0	Nov 2025	Hong Kong Open, China SAR	WTA 250	Hard	(Spain) Cristina Bucșa	7–5, 6–7^{(9–11)}, 6–2
Loss	2–1	Jan 2026	Adelaide International, Australia	WTA 500	Hard	Mirra Andreeva	3–6, 1–6
Loss	2–2	Feb 2026	Qatar Ladies Open, Qatar	WTA 1000	Hard	(Czech Republic) Karolína Muchová	4–6, 5–7
Loss	2–3	May 2026	Internationaux de Strasbourg, France	WTA 500	Clay	(United States) Emma Navarro	0–6, 7–5, 2–6

== WTA 125 finals ==
=== Singles: 1 (runner-up) ===
Result	Date	Tournament	Surface	Opponent	Score
Loss	May 2025	Parma Open, Italy	Clay	(Egypt) Mayar Sherif	4–6, 4–6

== ITF Circuit finals ==
=== Singles: 11 (8 titles, 3 runner-ups) ===
Legend W60/75 tournaments (3–0) W50 tournaments (0–1) W25/35 tournaments (5–2)	Finals by surface Hard (7–2) Clay (1–1)

Result	W–L	Date	Tournament	Tier	Surface	Opponents	Score
Loss	0–1	Apr 2022	ITF Monastir, Tunisia	W25	Hard	(China) Zhu Lin	1–6, 6–4, 4–6
Win	1–1	Jul 2022	Saskatoon Challenger, Canada	W25	Hard	(United States) Madison Sieg	6–2, 6–0
Win	2–1	Jul 2023	Saskatoon Challenger, Canada	W60	Hard	(United States) Emina Bektas	6–4, 6–4
Loss	2–2	May 2024	ITF Otocec, Slovenia	W50	Clay	(Czech Republic) Barbora Palicová	1–6, 6–2, 4–6
Win	3–2	Jul 2024	ITF Darmstadt, Germany	W35	Clay	(Spain) Ángela Fita Boluda	6–4, 6–4
Loss	3–3	Sep 2024	ITF Berkeley, United States	W35	Hard	(United States) Iva Jovic	3–6, 6–2, 3–6
Win	4–3	Jan 2025	ITF Le Lamentin, France	W35	Hard	(United States) Clervie Ngounoue	7–5, 6–3
Win	5–3	Jan 2025	ITF Petit-Bourg, France	W35	Hard	(United States) Clervie Ngounoue	6–4, 6–0
Win	6–3	Jan 2025	Georgia's Rome Open, US	W75	Hard (i)	(Netherlands) Eva Vedder	7–5, 6–3
Win	7–3	Feb 2025	ITF Manchester, UK	W35	Hard (i)	(France) Manon Léonard	7–6^{(7–0)}, 6–2
Win	8–3	Mar 2025	Porto Indoor, Portugal	W75	Hard (i)	(United Kingdom) Harriet Dart	6–1, 6–1

=== Doubles: 2 (2 titles) ===
Legend W35 tournaments (2–0)	Finals by surface Hard (2–0)

Result	W–L	Date	Tournament	Tier	Surface	Partner	Opponents	Score
Win	1–0	Jan 2025	ITF Le Lamentin, France (Martinique)	W35	Hard	(Canada) Cadence Brace	(Poland) Olivia Lincer (United States) Clervie Ngounoue	6–2, 7–6^{(2)}
Win	2–0	Jan 2025	ITF Petit-Bourg, France (Guadeloupe)	W35	Hard	(United States) Clervie Ngounoue	(United States) Jenna Dean (Mexico) Amanda Carolina Nava Elkin	6–3, 6–1

== Junior finals ==
=== Grand Slam tournaments ===
==== Doubles: 2 (2 runner-ups) ====
Result	Year	Tournament	Surface	Partner	Opponents	Score
Loss	2022	Australian Open	Hard	(Canada) Kayla Cross	(United States) Clervie Ngounoue (Russia) Diana Shnaider	4–6, 3–6
Loss	2022	Wimbledon	Grass	(Canada) Kayla Cross	(Netherlands) Rose Marie Nijkamp (Kenya) Angella Okutoyi	6–3, 4–6, [9–11]

== WTA Tour career earnings ==
Year	Titles			Earnings ($)	Rank
Year	Grand Slam	WTA	Total	Earnings ($)	Rank
2025	–	2	2	1,444,890	37
2026	–	–	–	1,800,978	17
Career	0	2	2	$3,307,577	256

- Note: Title counts include singles, doubles and mixed doubles titles.

== Wins against top 10 players ==
- Mboko has a 6–6 record against players who were, at the time the match was played, ranked in the top 10.

Season	2025	2026	Total
Wins	1	5	6

No.	Player	Rk	Event	Surface	Rd	Score	Rk	Years	Ref
1	(United States) Coco Gauff	2	Canadian Open, Canada	Hard	4R	6–1, 6–4	85	2025	
2	(United States) Madison Keys	9	Adelaide International, Australia	Hard	QF	6–4, 4–6, 6–2	17	2026	
3	Mirra Andreeva	7	Qatar Open, Qatar	Hard	3R	6–3, 3–6, 7–6^{(7–5)}	13	2026	
4	(Kazakhstan) Elena Rybakina	3	Qatar Open, Qatar	Hard	QF	7–5, 4–6, 6–4	13	2026	
5	(United States) Amanda Anisimova	6	Indian Wells Open, US	Hard	4R	6–4, 6–1	10	2026	
6	Mirra Andreeva	10	Miami Open, US	Hard	4R	7–6^{(7–4)}, 4–6, 6–0	9	2026	

- Key: (Rk) first use, opponent rank; (Rd) round; (Rk) 2nd use, player rank; (Ref) reference; (F) final; (SF) semifinal; (QF) quarterfinal; (#R) rounds 4, 3, 2, 1; (RR) round-robin stage; (Q#) qualifying rounds or stages (3), 2, 1.

== Awards ==
2025

- WTA Awards - Newcomer of the Year
- Tennis Canada Women's Player of the Year
