= 2025 Saskatoon Challenger =

Tennis tournament

- Date: 11–17 August 2025
- Edition: 5th
- Category: ITF Women's World Tennis Tour
- Prize money: $40,000
- Surface: Hard / Outdoor
- Location: Saskatoon, Canada

2024 Champions

Singles
- (Canada) Kayla Cross

Doubles
- (Canada) Ariana Arseneault / (Canada) Mia Kupres
- Saskatoon Challenger

The 2025 Saskatoon Challenger is a professional tennis tournament played on outdoor hard courts. It is the fifth edition of the tournament, which was part of the 2025 ITF Women's World Tennis Tour. It is taking place in Saskatoon, Canada, between 11 and 17 August 2025.

== Champions ==
=== Singles ===
- (Japan) Himeno Sakatsume def. (Romania) Anca Todoni, 7–6^{(7–1)}, 6–3

=== Doubles ===
- (Japan) Saki Imamura / (Japan) Hiroko Kuwata def. (Canada) Raphaëlle Lacasse / (Canada) Alexandra Vagramov, 7–6^{(7–3)}, 3–6, [10–1]

== Singles main draw entrants ==
=== Seeds ===
Country	Player	Rank	Seed
AUS	Olivia Gadecki	114	1
ROU	Anca Todoni	118	2
GBR	Jodie Burrage	151	3
JPN	Nao Hibino	178	4
USA	Hanna Chang	234	5
JPN	Himeno Sakatsume	236	6
CAN	Katherine Sebov	296	7
JPN	Saki Imamura	376	8

- Rankings are as of 4 August 2025.

=== Other entrants ===
The following players received wildcards into the singles main draw:

- (Canada) Teah Chavez
- (Canada) Bianca Fernandez
- (Canada) Isabella Marton

The following players received entry from the qualifying draw:

- (Canada) Avery Alexander
- (United States) Gabriella Mikaul
- (Italy) Giulia Alessia Monteleone
- (Canada) Scarlett Nicholson
- (United States) Autumn Pitts-Clark
- (United States) Kaede Usui
- (Canada) Selin Vakalapudi
- (China) Yichen Zhao
