= 2025 Hong Kong Tennis Open – Singles =

Singles
- 2025 Hong Kong Tennis Open

Final
- Champion: (Canada) Victoria Mboko
- Runner-up: (Spain) Cristina Bucșa
- Score: 7–5, 6–7^{(9–11)}, 6–2

Details
- Draw: 32 (6Q / 4WC)
- Seeds: 8

Events
Singles	Doubles
← 2024 ·	Hong Kong Tennis Open	· 2026 →

Victoria Mboko defeated Cristina Bucșa in the final, 7–5, 6–7^{(9–11)}, 6–2 to win the singles tennis title at the 2025 Hong Kong Tennis Open. It was her second WTA Tour title. At 2 hours and 49 minutes long, it was the longest WTA Tour singles final of the year.

Diana Shnaider was the reigning champion, but did not participate this year after qualifying for the WTA Finals in doubles.

Eudice Chong became the first player from Hong Kong to win a singles main-draw match at this tournament since Suzie Holm in 1980.

== Seeds ==
1. (Switzerland) Belinda Bencic (quarterfinals, withdrew)
2. (Canada) Leylah Fernandez (semifinals)
3. (Canada) Victoria Mboko (champion)
4. (United States) Sofia Kenin (first round)
5. (Australia) Maya Joint (semifinals)
6. Anna Kalinskaya (quarterfinals, retired)
7. (Romania) Sorana Cîrstea (quarterfinals)
8. (Colombia) Emiliana Arango (second round)

== Draw ==
Key

- Q = Qualifier
- WC = Wild card
- LL = Lucky loser
- Alt = Alternate
- ITF = ITF entry
- PR = Protected ranking
- SR = Special ranking
- SE = Special exempt
- JE = Junior exempt
- JR = Junior Accelerator Programme entrant
- CO = College Accelerator Programme entrant
- NG = Next Gen Accelerator Program entrant
- w/o = Walkover
- r = Retired
- d = Defaulted

=== Finals ===
Semifinals
(Spain) Cristina Bucșa	6	6
5	(Australia) Maya Joint	3	1
3	(Canada) Victoria Mboko	2	6	6
2	(Canada) Leylah Fernandez	6	3	2

Final
(Spain) Cristina Bucșa	5	7^{11}	2
3	(Canada) Victoria Mboko	7	6^{9}	6

=== Top half ===
First round
1/WC	(Switzerland) B Bencic	6	6
A Sasnovich	3	4
Q	(Australia) M Inglis	4	7^{8}	3
PR	(China) Y Wang	6	6^{6}	6
(Spain) C Bucșa	6	6
Q	(China) Y Ma	1	2
(Japan) M Uchijima	7^{7}	1	4
8	(Colombia) E Arango	6^{3}	6	6
4	(United States) S Kenin	2	1
Q	(Japan) H Sakatsume	6	6
WC	(Hong Kong) E Chong	6	6
(Netherlands) S Lamens	3	4
WC	(Hong Kong) C Wong	1	0
Q	(Slovakia) V Morvayová	6	6
PR	(Latvia) A Sevastova	6	4	3
5	(Australia) M Joint	2	6	6

Second round
1/WC	(Switzerland) B Bencic	6	6
PR	(China) Y Wang	2	2
(Spain) C Bucșa	6	6
8	(Colombia) E Arango	2	4
Q	(Japan) H Sakatsume	6	6
WC	(Hong Kong) E Chong	2	1
Q	(Slovakia) V Morvayová	1	4
5	(Australia) M Joint	6	6

Quarterfinals
1/WC	(Switzerland) B Bencic
(Spain) C Bucșa	w/o
Q	(Japan) H Sakatsume	4	6	4
5	(Australia) M Joint	6	2	6

Semifinals
(Spain) C Bucșa	6	6
5	(Australia) M Joint	3	1

=== Bottom half ===
First round
6	A Kalinskaya	6	6
K Rakhimova	4	4
(Slovenia) V Erjavec	2	2
(China) S Zhang	6	6
(Philippines) A Eala	6	2
(United Kingdom) K Boulter	4	1^{r}
(Australia) T Gibson	7^{7}	1	4
3	(Canada) V Mboko	6^{2}	6	6
7/WC	(Romania) S Cîrstea	7	6
(Hungary) D Gálfi	5	3
Q	(Japan) M Kobori	5	2
(Australia) A Tomljanović	7	6
Q	K Sidorova	0	3
(Germany) E Lys	6	6
(China) Xiy Wang	1	4
2	(Canada) L Fernandez	6	6

Second round
6	A Kalinskaya	6	6
(China) S Zhang	1	1
(Philippines) A Eala	6	3	4
3	(Canada) V Mboko	3	6	6
7/WC	(Romania) S Cîrstea	4	6	6
(Australia) A Tomljanović	6	4	3
(Germany) E Lys	4	1
2	(Canada) L Fernandez	6	6

Quarterfinals
6	A Kalinskaya	1	1^{r}
3	(Canada) V Mboko	6	3
7/WC	(Romania) S Cîrstea	4	4
2	(Canada) L Fernandez	6	6

Semifinals
3	(Canada) V Mboko	2	6	6
2	(Canada) L Fernandez	6	3	2

== Qualifying ==
=== Seeds ===
1. (Australia) Maddison Inglis (qualified)
2. (Japan) Kyōka Okamura (qualifying competition)
3. (Japan) Himeno Sakatsume (qualified)
4. (China) Ma Yexin (qualified)
5. (Japan) Haruka Kaji (qualifying competition)
6. (China) You Xiaodi (qualifying competition)
7. (Kazakhstan) Zarina Diyas (first round)
8. (Chinese Taipei) Liang En-shuo (withdrew)
9. (China) Lu Jiajing (qualifying competition)
10. (Japan) Miho Kuramochi (qualifying competition)
11. (United Kingdom) Emily Appleton (first round)
12. (Japan) Ikumi Yamazaki (first round)

=== Qualifiers ===
1. (Australia) Maddison Inglis
2. (Slovakia) Viktória Morvayová
3. (Japan) Himeno Sakatsume
4. (China) Ma Yexin
5. Kristiana Sidorova
6. (Japan) Momoko Kobori

=== Qualifying draw ===
==== First qualifier ====
First round
1	(Australia) Maddison Inglis	6	6
Marina Melnikova	2	4
WC	(Hong Kong) Maggie Ng	6	2	4
9	(China) Lu Jiajing	2	6	6

Qualifying competition
1	(Australia) Maddison Inglis	6	6
9	(China) Lu Jiajing	4	4

==== Second qualifier ====
First round
2	(Japan) Kyōka Okamura	6	2	6
(China) Guo Meiqi	1	6	4
(Slovakia) Viktória Morvayová	4	6	7
11	(United Kingdom) Emily Appleton	6	4	5

Qualifying competition
2	(Japan) Kyōka Okamura	6	3	4
(Slovakia) Viktória Morvayová	4	6	6

==== Third qualifier ====
First round
3	(Japan) Himeno Sakatsume	6	6
(Finland) Anastasia Kulikova	2	3
WC	(China) Anna Yang	3	0
10	(Japan) Miho Kuramochi	6	6

Qualifying competition
3	(Japan) Himeno Sakatsume	6	6
10	(Japan) Miho Kuramochi	0	1

==== Fourth qualifier ====
First round
4	(China) Ma Yexin	7	7^{8}
WC	(China) Li Yuyao	5	6^{6}
(Ukraine) Nadiya Kolb	5	6^{7}
Alt	(United States) Amy Zhu	7	7^{9}

Qualifying competition
4	(China) Ma Yexin	7	6
Alt	(United States) Amy Zhu	5	1

==== Fifth qualifier ====
First round
5	(Japan) Haruka Kaji	7^{7}	6
WC	(Hong Kong) Kallista Liu	6^{4}	4
Kristiana Sidorova	3	6	6
7	(Kazakhstan) Zarina Diyas	6	3	4

Qualifying competition
5	(Japan) Haruka Kaji	1	2
Kristiana Sidorova	6	6

==== Sixth qualifier ====
First round
6	(China) You Xiaodi	7^{8}	6
(China) Zhang Ying	6^{6}	4
(Japan) Momoko Kobori	6	6
12	(Japan) Ikumi Yamazaki	2	3

Qualifying competition
6	(China) You Xiaodi	7^{7}	5	1
(Japan) Momoko Kobori	6^{4}	7	6
