= 2023 Saskatoon Challenger =

Tennis tournament

- Date: 10–16 July 2023
- Edition: 3rd
- Category: ITF Women's World Tennis Tour
- Prize money: $60,000
- Surface: Hard / Outdoor
- Location: Saskatoon, Canada

Champions

Singles
- (Canada) Victoria Mboko

Doubles
- (United States) Abigail Rencheli / (United States) Alana Smith
- Saskatoon Challenger

The 2023 Saskatoon Challenger was a professional tennis tournament played on outdoor hard courts. It was the third edition of the tournament, which was part of the 2023 ITF Women's World Tennis Tour. It took place in Saskatoon, Canada, between 10 and 16 July 2023.

== Champions ==
=== Singles ===
- (Canada) Victoria Mboko def. (United States) Emina Bektas, 6–4, 6–4

=== Doubles ===
- (United States) Abigail Rencheli / (United States) Alana Smith def. (Canada) Stacey Fung / (India) Karman Thandi, 4–6, 6–4, [10–7]

== Singles main draw entrants ==
=== Seeds ===
Country	Player	Rank	Seed
AUS	Kimberly Birrell	117	1
USA	Kayla Day	120	2
USA	Emina Bektas	140	3
USA	Sachia Vickery	163	4
JPN	Himeno Sakatsume	170	5
CAN	Stacey Fung	230	6
IND	Karman Thandi	233	7
MEX	Renata Zarazúa	242	8

- Rankings are as of 3 July 2023.

=== Other entrants ===
The following players received wildcards into the singles main draw:

- (Canada) Mia Kupres
- (Canada) Orly Ogilvy
- (Canada) Martyna Ostrzygalo
- (Canada) Layne Sleeth

The following players received entry from the qualifying draw:

- (Canada) Iulia Bucea
- (United States) Eryn Cayetano
- (Canada) Alexia Jacobs
- (Canada) Louise Kwong
- (United States) Ava Markham
- (Canada) Dasha Plekhanova
- (United States) Alana Smith
- (Canada) Rhea Verma
