= 2023 Saskatoon Challenger – Doubles =

Doubles
- 2023 Saskatoon Challenger

Final
- Champions: (United States) Abigail Rencheli (United States) Alana Smith
- Runners-up: (Canada) Stacey Fung (India) Karman Thandi
- Score: 4–6, 6–4, [10–7]

Events
Singles	Doubles
- Saskatoon Challenger

Kayla Cross and Marina Stakusic were the defending champions but Stakusic chose not to participate. Cross partnered alongside Victoria Mboko but lost to Abigail Rencheli and Alana Smith in the first round.

Rencheli and Smith went on to win the title, defeating Stacey Fung and Karman Thandi in the final, 4–6, 6–4, [10–7].

== Seeds ==
1. (United States) Victoria Hu / (Mexico) Renata Zarazúa (quarterfinals)
2. (Australia) Elysia Bolton / (United States) Eryn Cayetano (quarterfinals)
3. (Serbia) Katarina Kozarov / (United States) Ava Markham (quarterfinals)
4. (United States) Jessica Failla / (United States) McCartney Kessler (quarterfinals)

== Draw ==
Key

- Q = Qualifier
- WC = Wild card
- LL = Lucky loser
- Alt = Alternate
- ITF = ITF entry
- PR = Protected ranking
- SR = Special ranking
- SE = Special exempt
- JE = Junior exempt
- JR = Junior Accelerator Programme entrant
- CO = College Accelerator Programme entrant
- NG = Next Gen Accelerator Program entrant
- w/o = Walkover
- r = Retired
- d = Defaulted

First round
1	(United States) V Hu (Mexico) R Zarazúa	6	6
WC	(Canada) A Cau (Canada) T Chavez	4	0
(Canada) S Fung (India) K Thandi	6	6
(Vietnam) S Lý-Nguyễn (Slovakia) M Okáľová	2	2
4	(United States) J Failla (United States) M Kessler	6	6
(Canada) O Ogilvy (Canada) M Ostrzygalo	2	2
(United States) E Lella (United States) G Price	3	3
(United States) C Corley (United States) I Corley	6	6
(Canada) K Cross (Canada) V Mboko	6^{5}	2
(United States) A Rencheli (United States) A Smith	7^{7}	6
(Canada) L Kwong (United States) A Ulyashchenko	2	7^{7}	[3]
3	(Serbia) K Kozarov (United States) A Markham	6	6^{2}	[10]
WC	(Canada) A Jacobs (Canada) S Nicholson	2	5
(Canada) B Fernandez (Canada) M Kupres	6	7
(United States) K Pierre-Louis (Canada) L Sleeth	3	5
2	(Australia) E Bolton (United States) E Cayetano	6	7

Quarterfinals
1	(United States) V Hu (Mexico) R Zarazúa	6^{5}	4
(Canada) S Fung (India) K Thandi	7^{7}	6
4	(United States) J Failla (United States) M Kessler	6^{1}	0
(United States) C Corley (United States) I Corley	7^{7}	6
(United States) A Rencheli (United States) A Smith	6	6
3	(Serbia) K Kozarov (United States) A Markham	3	4
(Canada) B Fernandez (Canada) M Kupres	1	6	[11]
2	(Australia) E Bolton (United States) E Cayetano	6	2	[9]

Semifinals
(Canada) S Fung (India) K Thandi	6	5	[11]
(United States) C Corley (United States) I Corley	4	7	[9]
(United States) A Rencheli (United States) A Smith	2	7^{7}	[10]
(Canada) B Fernandez (Canada) M Kupres	6	6^{2}	[6]

Final
(Canada) S Fung (India) K Thandi	6	4	[7]
(United States) A Rencheli (United States) A Smith	4	6	[10]
