= 2026 Internationaux de Strasbourg =

- Date: 17–23 May
- Edition: 40th
- Category: WTA 500
- Draw: 28S / 16D
- Surface: Clay
- Location: Strasbourg, France
- Venue: Tennis Club de Strasbourg

Champions

Singles
- (United States) Emma Navarro

Doubles
- (Canada) Gabriela Dabrowski / (Brazil) Luisa Stefani
- Internationaux de Strasbourg

The 2026 Internationaux de Strasbourg was a women's professional tennis tournament played on outdoor clay courts in Strasbourg, France. It was the 40th edition of the tournament and part of the WTA 500 tournaments of the 2026 WTA Tour. It took place at the Tennis Club de Strasbourg between 17 and 23 May 2026.

== Finals ==
=== Singles ===
- (United States) Emma Navarro def. (Canada) Victoria Mboko, 6–0, 5–7, 6–2

=== Doubles ===
- (Canada) Gabriela Dabrowski / (Brazil) Luisa Stefani def. (Norway) Ulrikke Eikeri / (United States) Quinn Gleason, 7–5, 6–4

== Singles main-draw entrants ==
=== Seeds ===
| Country | Player | Rank^{1} | Seed |
|---|---|---|---|
| CAN | Victoria Mboko | 9 | 1 |
| | Ekaterina Alexandrova | 14 | 2 |
| USA | Iva Jovic | 17 | 3 |
| DEN | Clara Tauson | 18 | 4 |
| ~~USA~~ | ~~Madison Keys~~ | ~~19~~ | ~~5~~ |
| | Liudmila Samsonova | 21 | 6 |
| CAN | Leylah Fernandez | 23 | 7 |
| CZE | Marie Bouzková | 26 | 8 |

- Rankings are as of 4 May 2026.

=== Other entrants ===
The following players received wildcards into the singles main draw:

- (France) Loïs Boisson
- (France) Léolia Jeanjean
- (Canada) Victoria Mboko
- (France) Diane Parry

The following player received entry as a replacement Top 30 player:

- (United Kingdom) Emma Raducanu

The following players received entry from the qualifying draw:

- (Australia) Talia Gibson
- (Australia) Daria Kasatkina
- (United States) McCartney Kessler
- (Ukraine) Oleksandra Oliynykova

The following player received entry as a lucky loser:

- (China) Zhang Shuai

=== Withdrawals ===
- (United States) Hailey Baptiste → replaced by (Philippines) Alexandra Eala
- (Italy) Elisabetta Cocciaretto → replaced by (Czech Republic) Kateřina Siniaková
- (United States) Madison Keys → replaced by (China) Zhang Shuai
- (Ukraine) Marta Kostyuk → replaced by (United Kingdom) Emma Raducanu

== Doubles main-draw entrants ==
=== Seeds ===
| Country | Player | Country | Player | Rank^{1} | Seed |
|---|---|---|---|---|---|
| CAN | Gabriela Dabrowski | BRA | Luisa Stefani | 15 | 1 |
| NZL | Erin Routliffe | CHN | Zhang Shuai | 22 | 2 |
| ESP | Cristina Bucșa | USA | Nicole Melichar-Martinez | 33 | 3 |
| USA | Asia Muhammad | HUN | Fanny Stollár | 53 | 4 |

- ^{1} Rankings as of 4 May 2026.
