= 2026 Adelaide International =

Tennis tournament

- Date: 12–17 January 2026
- Category: ATP 250; WTA 500
- Draw: 28S / 24D (ATP); 30S / 16D (WTA)
- Surface: Hard / outdoor
- Location: Memorial Drive Tennis Centre
- Venue: Adelaide, Australia

Champions

Men's singles
- (Czech Republic) Tomáš Macháč

Women's singles
- Mirra Andreeva

Men's doubles
- (Finland) Harri Heliövaara / (United Kingdom) Henry Patten

Women's doubles
- (Czech Republic) Kateřina Siniaková / (China) Zhang Shuai
- Adelaide International

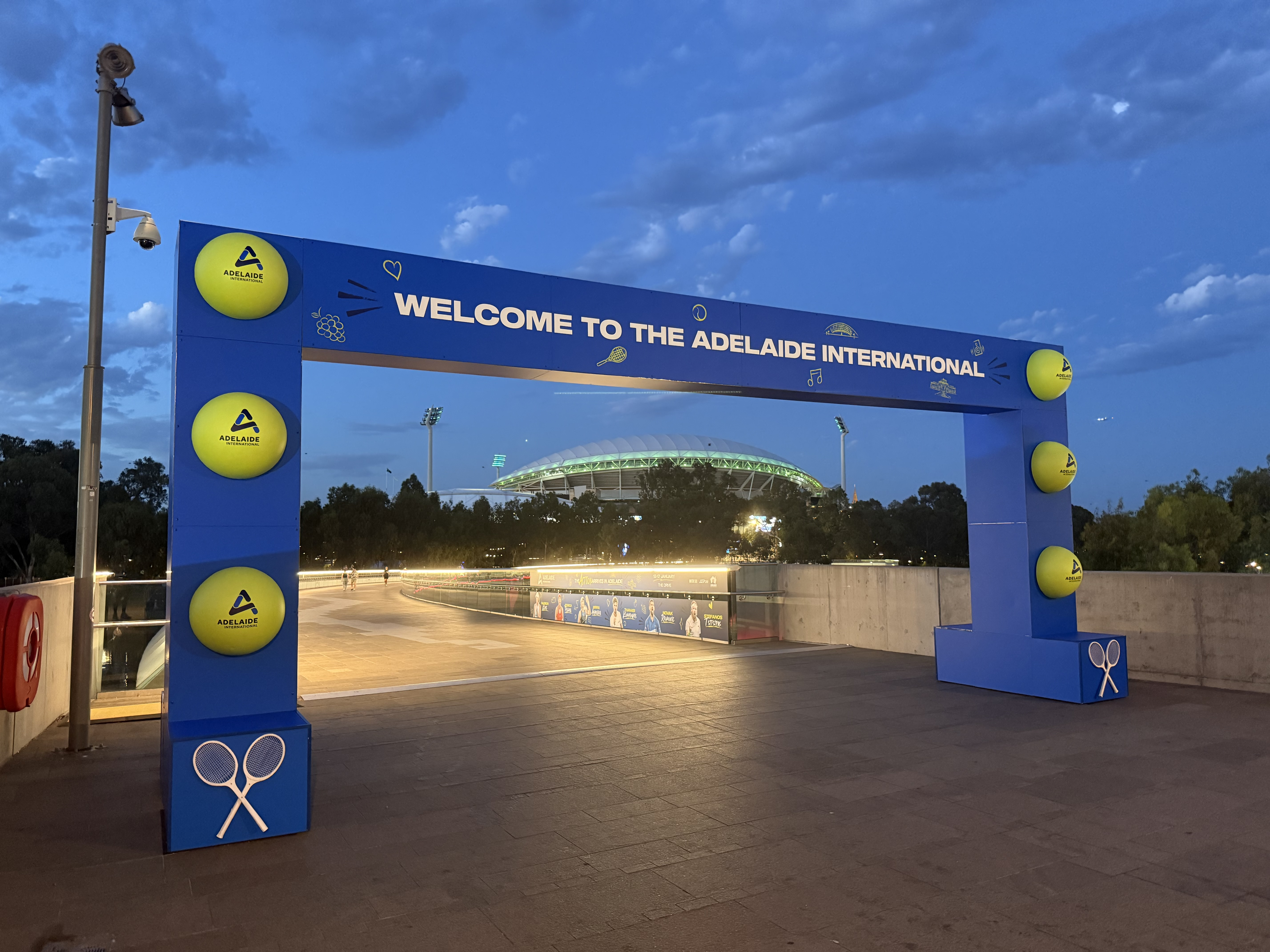
2026 Adelaide International promotion material

The 2026 Adelaide International was a professional tennis tournament on the 2026 ATP Tour and 2026 WTA Tour. It was a combined ATP Tour 250 and WTA 500 tournament played on outdoor hard courts at Memorial Drive Tennis Centre, Adelaide, Australia. The tournament was held from 12 to 17 January 2026.

== Champions ==
=== Men's singles ===
- (Czech Republic) Tomáš Macháč def. (France) Ugo Humbert, 6–4, 6–7^{(2–7)}, 6–2

=== Women's singles ===
- Mirra Andreeva def. (Canada) Victoria Mboko, 6–3, 6–1

=== Men's doubles ===
- (Finland) Harri Heliövaara / (United Kingdom) Henry Patten def. (Germany) Kevin Krawietz / (Germany) Tim Pütz, 6–3, 6–2

=== Women's doubles ===
- (Czech Republic) Kateřina Siniaková / (China) Zhang Shuai def. (Ukraine) Lyudmyla Kichenok / (United States) Desirae Krawczyk, 6–1, 6–4

== ATP singles main-draw entrants ==
=== Seeds ===
| Country | Player | Rank^{1} | Seed |
|---|---|---|---|
| ESP | Alejandro Davidovich Fokina | 14 | 1 |
| USA | Tommy Paul | 20 | 2 |
| ARG | Francisco Cerúndolo | 21 | 3 |
| NED | Tallon Griekspoor | 25 | 4 |
| MON | Valentin Vacherot | 31 | 5 |
| ~~USA~~ | ~~Brandon Nakashima~~ | ~~33~~ | ~~6~~ |
| GRE | Stefanos Tsitsipas | 34 | 7 |
| CZE | Tomáš Macháč | 35 | 8 |

^{1} Rankings are as of 5 January 2026

=== Other entrants ===
The following players received wildcards into the singles main draw:

- (Australia) James Duckworth
- (Australia) Rinky Hijikata
- (Australia) Tristan Schoolkate

The following players received entry from the qualifying draw:

- (France) Quentin Halys
- (Kazakhstan) Alexander Shevchenko
- (Italy) Andrea Vavassori
- (Australia) Aleksandar Vukic

The following player received entry as a lucky loser:

- (United Kingdom) Jacob Fearnley

=== Withdrawals ===
- (Serbia) Novak Djokovic → replaced by (United States) Reilly Opelka
- (United Kingdom) Jack Draper → replaced by (Australia) Alexei Popyrin
- (France) Arthur Fils → replaced by (United States) Sebastian Korda
- (Brazil) João Fonseca → replaced by (United States) Ethan Quinn
- (Czech Republic) Jiří Lehečka → replaced by (Hungary) Márton Fucsovics
- (France) Corentin Moutet → replaced by (Germany) Daniel Altmaier
- (United States) Brandon Nakashima → replaced by (United Kingdom) Jacob Fearnley (LL)
- (France) Arthur Rinderknech → replaced by (Serbia) Miomir Kecmanović

== ATP doubles main-draw entrants ==
=== Seeds ===
| Country | Player | Country | Player | Rank^{1} | Seed |
|---|---|---|---|---|---|
| GBR | Julian Cash | GBR | Lloyd Glasspool | 3 | 1 |
| FIN | Harri Heliövaara | GBR | Henry Patten | 6 | 2 |
| ESA | Marcelo Arévalo | CRO | Mate Pavić | 14 | 3 |
| GER | Kevin Krawietz | GER | Tim Pütz | 22 | 4 |
| USA | Christian Harrison | GBR | Neal Skupski | 24 | 5 |
| ITA | Simone Bolelli | ITA | Andrea Vavassori | 27 | 6 |
| MON | Hugo Nys | FRA | Édouard Roger-Vasselin | 35 | 7 |
| ARG | Guido Andreozzi | FRA | Manuel Guinard | 55 | 8 |

^{1} Rankings are as of 5 January 2026

=== Other entrants ===
The following pairs received wildcards into the doubles main draw:

- (Australia) Blake Bayldon / (Australia) Patrick Harper
- (Australia) Rinky Hijikata / (Australia) Tristan Schoolkate

The following pair received entry using a protected ranking:

- (Bosnia and Herzegovina) Tomislav Brkić / (Bosnia and Herzegovina) Damir Džumhur

== WTA singles main-draw entrants ==
=== Seeds ===
| Country | Player | Rank^{1} | Seed |
|---|---|---|---|
| ~~USA~~ | ~~Jessica Pegula~~ | ~~6~~ | ~~1~~ |
| USA | Madison Keys | 7 | 2 |
| | Mirra Andreeva | 9 | 3 |
| | Ekaterina Alexandrova | 10 | 4 |
| DEN | Clara Tauson | 14 | 5 |
| USA | Emma Navarro | 15 | 6 |
| | Liudmila Samsonova | 17 | 7 |
| CAN | Victoria Mboko | 18 | 8 |
| | Diana Shnaider | 21 | 9 |

^{1} Rankings are as of 5 January 2026

=== Other entrants ===
The following players received wildcards into the singles main draw:

- (Australia) Kimberly Birrell
- (Australia) Emerson Jones
- (Greece) Maria Sakkari
- (Australia) Ajla Tomljanović

The following players received entry using a protected ranking:

- (Brazil) Beatriz Haddad Maia
- (Czech Republic) Markéta Vondroušová

The following players received entry from the qualifying draw:

- ~~(Romania) Sorana Cîrstea~~
- (Romania) Jaqueline Cristian
- (Hungary) Dalma Gálfi
- (Kazakhstan) Yulia Putintseva
- (Romania) Elena-Gabriela Ruse
- (Czech Republic) Tereza Valentová

The following players received entry as lucky losers:

- (Czech Republic) Marie Bouzková
- (Austria) Anastasia Potapova
- (Czech Republic) Katerina Siniakova

=== Withdrawals ===
- (Switzerland) Belinda Bencic → replaced by Anna Kalinskaya
- (Romania) Sorana Cîrstea → replaced by (Czech Republic) Kateřina Siniaková (LL)
- (Ukraine) Marta Kostyuk → replaced by (Czech Republic) Marie Bouzková (LL)
- (Czech Republic) Linda Nosková → replaced by (Australia) Maya Joint
- (United States) Jessica Pegula → replaced by (Austria) Anastasia Potapova (LL)

== WTA doubles main-draw entrants ==
=== Seeds ===
| Country | Player | Country | Player | Rank^{1} | Seed |
|---|---|---|---|---|---|
| TPE | Hsieh Su-wei | LAT | Jeļena Ostapenko | 16 | 1 |
| CZE | Kateřina Siniaková | CHN | Zhang Shuai | 17 | 2 |
| USA | Asia Muhammad | NZL | Erin Routliffe | 27 | 3 |
| KAZ | Anna Danilina | SRB | Aleksandra Krunic | 31 | 4 |

^{1} Rankings are as of 5 January 2026

=== Other entrants ===
The following pair received a wildcard into the doubles main draw:

- (Australia) Kimberly Birrell / (Australia) Maya Joint

The following pairs received entry using a protected ranking:

- (Norway) Ulrikke Eikeri / (Estonia) Ingrid Neel
- ~~(Austria) Anastasia Potapova / Vera Zvonareva~~

The following pair received entry as alternates:

- (Argentina) Nicole Fossa Huergo / (Hungary) Dalma Gálfi

=== Withdrawals ===
- (Austria) Anastasia Potapova / Vera Zvonareva → replaced by (Argentina) Nicole Fossa Huergo / (Hungary) Dalma Gálfi (Alt)
