= 2026 Adelaide International – Men's doubles =

Tennis men's doubles tournament

Men's doubles
- 2026 Adelaide International

Final
- Champions: (Finland) Harri Heliövaara (United Kingdom) Henry Patten
- Runners-up: (Germany) Kevin Krawietz (Germany) Tim Pütz
- Score: 6–3, 6–2

Details
- Draw: 24
- Seeds: 8

Events
Singles	men	women
Doubles	men	women
- Adelaide International

Harri Heliövaara and Henry Patten defeated Kevin Krawietz and Tim Pütz in the final, 6–3, 6–2 to win the doubles tennis title at the 2026 Adelaide International. It was Heliövaara's 13th ATP Tour title and Patten's ninth.

Simone Bolelli and Andrea Vavassori were the defending champions, but lost in the semifinals to Heliövaara and Patten.

== Seeds ==
All seeds received a bye into the second round.

1. (United Kingdom) Julian Cash / (United Kingdom) Lloyd Glasspool (second round)
2. (Finland) Harri Heliövaara / (United Kingdom) Henry Patten (champions)
3. (El Salvador) Marcelo Arévalo / (Croatia) Mate Pavić (quarterfinals)
4. (Germany) Kevin Krawietz / (Germany) Tim Pütz (final)
5. (United States) Christian Harrison / (United Kingdom) Neal Skupski (semifinals)
6. (Italy) Simone Bolelli / (Italy) Andrea Vavassori (semifinals)
7. (Monaco) Hugo Nys / (France) Édouard Roger-Vasselin (quarterfinals)
8. (Argentina) Guido Andreozzi / (France) Manuel Guinard (second round)

== Draw ==
Key

- Q = Qualifier
- WC = Wild card
- LL = Lucky loser
- Alt = Alternate
- ITF = ITF entry
- PR = Protected ranking
- SR = Special ranking
- SE = Special exempt
- JE = Junior exempt
- JR = Junior Accelerator Programme entrant
- CO = College Accelerator Programme entrant
- NG = Next Gen Accelerator Program entrant
- w/o = Walkover
- r = Retired
- d = Defaulted

=== Finals ===
Semifinals
5	(United States) Christian Harrison (United Kingdom) Neal Skupski	3	6	[5]
4	(Germany) Kevin Krawietz (Germany) Tim Pütz	6	2	[10]
6	(Italy) Simone Bolelli (Italy) Andrea Vavassori	4	5
2	(Finland) Harri Heliövaara (United Kingdom) Henry Patten	6	7

Final
4	(Germany) Kevin Krawietz (Germany) Tim Pütz	3	2
2	(Finland) Harri Heliövaara (United Kingdom) Henry Patten	6	6

=== Top half ===
First round
(Australia) M Romios (United States) R Seggerman	6	6
WC	(Australia) R Hijikata (Australia) T Schoolkate	3	4
(United States) A Krajicek (Croatia) N Mektić	6^{4}	5
(Brazil) O Luz (Brazil) R Matos	7^{7}	7
WC	(Australia) B Bayldon (Australia) P Harper	2	7	[7]
(United States) E King (Australia) J Peers	6	5	[10]
(Czech Republic) T Macháč (Czech Republic) M Vocel	6	6
(Czech Republic) A Pavlásek (Australia) J-P Smith	4	4

Second round
1	(United Kingdom) J Cash (United Kingdom) L Glasspool	4	7^{7}	[9]
(Australia) M Romios (United States) R Seggerman	6	6^{2}	[11]
(Brazil) O Luz (Brazil) R Matos	6^{5}	4
5	(United States) C Harrison (United Kingdom) N Skupski	7^{7}	6
4	(Germany) K Krawietz (Germany) T Pütz	7^{7}	6
(United States) E King (Australia) J Peers	6^{2}	3
(Czech Republic) T Macháč (Czech Republic) M Vocel	6	6^{5}	[11]
7	(Monaco) H Nys (France) É Roger-Vasselin	2	7^{7}	[13]

Quarterfinals
(Australia) M Romios (United States) R Seggerman	3	4
5	(United States) C Harrison (United Kingdom) N Skupski	6	6
4	(Germany) K Krawietz (Germany) T Pütz	7^{7}	4	[10]
7	(Monaco) H Nys (France) É Roger-Vasselin	6^{5}	6	[8]

Semifinals
5	(United States) C Harrison (United Kingdom) N Skupski	3	6	[5]
4	(Germany) K Krawietz (Germany) T Pütz	6	2	[10]

=== Bottom half ===
First round
(United Kingdom) L Johnson (Poland) J Zieliński	5	6	[10]
(Uruguay) A Behar (Belgium) J Vliegen	7	2	[4]
Alt	(United Kingdom) J Fearnley (Ecuador) D Hidalgo	6^{5}	6	[7]
(Chinese Taipei) R Ho (Germany) H Jebens	7^{7}	3	[10]
(Netherlands) S Arends (Monaco) R Arneodo	1	2
(Argentina) M González (Argentina) A Molteni	6	6
(Germany) J Schnaitter (Germany) M Wallner	6	6
PR	(Bosnia and Herzegovina) T Brkić (Bosnia and Herzegovina) D Džumhur	2	2

Second round
6	(Italy) S Bolelli (Italy) A Vavassori	7^{7}	6
(United Kingdom) L Johnson (Poland) J Zieliński	6^{2}	2
(Chinese Taipei) R Ho (Germany) H Jebens	2	4
3	(El Salvador) M Arévalo (Croatia) M Pavić	6	6
8	(Argentina) G Andreozzi (France) M Guinard	3	2
(Argentina) M González (Argentina) A Molteni	6	6
(Germany) J Schnaitter (Germany) M Wallner	4	6	[6]
2	(Finland) H Heliövaara (United Kingdom) H Patten	6	2	[10]

Quarterfinals
6	(Italy) S Bolelli (Italy) A Vavassori	6^{6}	6	[12]
3	(El Salvador) M Arévalo (Croatia) M Pavić	7^{8}	4	[10]
(Argentina) M González (Argentina) A Molteni	6^{4}	4
2	(Finland) H Heliövaara (United Kingdom) H Patten	7^{7}	6

Semifinals
6	(Italy) S Bolelli (Italy) A Vavassori	4	5
2	(Finland) H Heliövaara (United Kingdom) H Patten	6	7
