= 2023 Saskatoon Challenger – Singles =

Singles
- 2023 Saskatoon Challenger

Final
- Champion: (Canada) Victoria Mboko
- Runner-up: (United States) Emina Bektas
- Score: 6–4, 6–4

Events
Singles	Doubles
- Saskatoon Challenger

Victoria Mboko was the defending champion and successfully defended her title, defeating Emina Bektas in the final, 6–4, 6–4.

== Seeds ==
1. (Australia) Kimberly Birrell (first round)
2. (United States) Kayla Day (second round)
3. (United States) Emina Bektas (final)
4. (United States) Sachia Vickery (first round, retired)
5. (Japan) Himeno Sakatsume (second round)
6. (Canada) Stacey Fung (quarterfinals)
7. (India) Karman Thandi (second round)
8. (Mexico) Renata Zarazúa (quarterfinals)

== Draw ==
Key

- Q = Qualifier
- WC = Wild card
- LL = Lucky loser
- Alt = Alternate
- ITF = ITF entry
- PR = Protected ranking
- SR = Special ranking
- SE = Special exempt
- JE = Junior exempt
- JR = Junior Accelerator Programme entrant
- CO = College Accelerator Programme entrant
- NG = Next Gen Accelerator Program entrant
- w/o = Walkover
- r = Retired
- d = Defaulted

=== Finals ===
Semifinals
(Serbia) Katarina Kozarov	3	2
3	(United States) Emina Bektas	6	6
(Canada) Victoria Mboko	6	6
(United States) Grace Min	1	1

Final
3	(United States) Emina Bektas	4	4
(Canada) Victoria Mboko	6	6

=== Top half ===
First round
1	(Australia) K Birrell	6	2	1
(United States) J Failla	4	6	6
WC	(Canada) O Ogilvy	0	1
(Serbia) K Kozarov	6	6
Q	(United States) A Smith	6	6
(Slovakia) M Okáľová	4	3
(Canada) B Fernandez	4	4
7	(India) K Thandi	6	6
3	(United States) E Bektas	6	6
Q	(Canada) R Verma	0	1
(United States) J Loeb	4	6	6^{3}
Q	(United States) A Markham	6	3	7^{7}
WC	(Canada) M Ostrzygalo	6	0	0
(United States) M Kessler	3	6	6
WC	(Canada) L Sleeth	2	1
6	(Canada) S Fung	6	6

Second round
(United States) J Failla	6^{4}	5
(Serbia) K Kozarov	7^{7}	7
Q	(United States) A Smith	6	6
7	(India) K Thandi	3	2
3	(United States) E Bektas	6	6
Q	(United States) A Markham	1	2
(United States) M Kessler	1	4
6	(Canada) S Fung	6	6

Quarterfinals
(Serbia) K Kozarov	3	7	6
Q	(United States) A Smith	6	5	3
3	(United States) E Bektas	6	6
6	(Canada) S Fung	4	4

Semifinals
(Serbia) K Kozarov	3	2
3	(United States) E Bektas	6	6

=== Bottom half ===
First round
8	(Mexico) R Zarazúa	6	6
Q	(Canada) D Plekhanova	4	4
WC	(Canada) M Kupres	6	7
Q	(United States) E Cayetano	3	5
Q	(Canada) I Bucea	1^{r}
(Australia) E Bolton	2
(Canada) V Mboko	6	2
4	(United States) S Vickery	2	0^{r}
5	(Japan) H Sakatsume	6	6
Q	(Canada) L Kwong	1	4
(Canada) K Cross	7^{7}	6
Q	(Canada) A Jacobs	6^{3}	3
(United States) V Hu	6	4	2
(United States) G Min	2	6	6
(Japan) K Okamura	4	4
2	(United States) K Day	6	6

Second round
8	(Mexico) R Zarazúa	6	6
WC	(Canada) M Kupres	3	1
(Australia) E Bolton	3	3
(Canada) V Mboko	6	6
5	(Japan) H Sakatsume	4	3
(Canada) K Cross	6	6
(United States) G Min	6	7^{7}
2	(United States) K Day	3	6^{4}

Quarterfinals
8	(Mexico) R Zarazúa	1	2
(Canada) V Mboko	6	6
(Canada) K Cross	2^{r}
(United States) G Min	5

Semifinals
(Canada) V Mboko	6	6
(United States) G Min	1	1
