= 2025 Hong Kong Tennis Open – Doubles =

Doubles
- 2025 Hong Kong Tennis Open

Final
- Champions: (China) Jiang Xinyu (China) Wang Yafan
- Runners-up: (Japan) Momoko Kobori (Thailand) Peangtarn Plipuech
- Score: 6–4, 6–2

Details
- Draw: 16
- Seeds: 4

Events
Singles	Doubles
← 2024 ·	Hong Kong Tennis Open	· 2026 →

Jiang Xinyu and Wang Yafan defeated Momoko Kobori and Peangtarn Plipuech in the final, 6–4, 6–2 to win the doubles tennis title at the 2025 Hong Kong Tennis Open.

Ulrikke Eikeri and Makoto Ninomiya were the reigning champions, but Eikeri did not participate this year. Ninomiya partnered Nadiia Kichenok, but they lost in the first round to Kobori and Plipuech.

== Seeds ==
1. (Japan) Eri Hozumi / (Chinese Taipei) Wu Fang-hsien (first round)
2. (Ukraine) Nadiia Kichenok / (Japan) Makoto Ninomiya (first round)
3. (United Kingdom) Emily Appleton / (China) Tang Qianhui (first round)
4. (United States) Sabrina Santamaria / (Japan) Moyuka Uchijima (quarterfinals)

== Draw ==
Key

- Q = Qualifier
- WC = Wild card
- LL = Lucky loser
- Alt = Alternate
- ITF = ITF entry
- PR = Protected ranking
- SR = Special ranking
- SE = Special exempt
- JE = Junior exempt
- JR = Junior Accelerator Programme entrant
- CO = College Accelerator Programme entrant
- NG = Next Gen Accelerator Program entrant
- w/o = Walkover
- r = Retired
- d = Defaulted

=== Draw ===
First round
1	(Japan) E Hozumi (Chinese Taipei) F-h Wu	6	3	[5]
(Hong Kong) E Chong (Hong Kong) C Wong	4	6	[10]
(Ukraine) M Kolb (Ukraine) N Kolb	0	0
(China) X Jiang (China) Y Wang	6	6
3	(United Kingdom) E Appleton (China) Q Tang	7^{7}	2	[8]
(China) S Feng (Chinese Taipei) E-s Liang	6^{4}	6	[10]
WC	(China) Y Ma (China) Y Zhang	2	0^{r}
(China) Xiy Wang (China) X You	6	0
K Rakhimova; A Sasnovich	3	6	[10]
(Chinese Taipei) H-c Chan (Philippines) A Eala	6	1	[7]
WC	(Hong Kong) J Leong (Hong Kong) M Ng	2	1
4	(United States) S Santamaria (Japan) M Uchijima	6	6
(Hungary) D Gálfi (Netherlands) S Lamens	3	3
(Australia) T Gibson (Australia) M Inglis	6	6
(Japan) M Kobori (Thailand) P Plipuech	7	6
2	(Ukraine) N Kichenok (Japan) M Ninomiya	5	4

Quarterfinals
(Hong Kong) E Chong (Hong Kong) C Wong	6^{4}	4
(China) X Jiang (China) Y Wang	7^{7}	6
(China) S Feng (Chinese Taipei) E-s Liang	6	4	[10]
(China) Xiy Wang (China) X You	1	6	[5]
K Rakhimova; A Sasnovich	6	6
4	(United States) S Santamaria (Japan) M Uchijima	1	0
(Australia) T Gibson (Australia) M Inglis	6^{2}	4
(Japan) M Kobori (Thailand) P Plipuech	7^{7}	6

Semifinals
(China) X Jiang (China) Y Wang	6	6
(China) S Feng (Chinese Taipei) E-s Liang	2	2
K Rakhimova; A Sasnovich	2	6	[8]
(Japan) M Kobori (Thailand) P Plipuech	6	4	[10]

Final
(China) X Jiang (China) Y Wang	6	6
(Japan) M Kobori (Thailand) P Plipuech	4	2
