= 2026 Adelaide International – Women's doubles =

Women's doubles
- 2026 Adelaide International

Final
- Champions: (Czech Republic) Kateřina Siniaková (China) Zhang Shuai
- Runners-up: (Ukraine) Lyudmyla Kichenok (United States) Desirae Krawczyk
- Score: 6–1, 6–4

Events
Singles	men	women
Doubles	men	women
- Adelaide International

Kateřina Siniaková and Zhang Shuai defeated Lyudmyla Kichenok and Desirae Krawczyk in the final, 6–1, 6–4 to win the women's doubles tennis title at the 2026 Adelaide International.

Guo Hanyu and Alexandra Panova were the reigning champions, but Guo did not participate this year. Panova partnered Irina Khromacheva, but lost in the first round to Kichenok and Krawczyk.

== Seeds ==
1. (Chinese Taipei) Hsieh Su-wei / (Latvia) Jeļena Ostapenko (quarterfinals, withdrew)
2. (Czech Republic) Kateřina Siniaková / (China) Zhang Shuai (champions)
3. (United States) Asia Muhammad / (New Zealand) Erin Routliffe (quarterfinals)
4. (Kazakhstan) Anna Danilina / (Serbia) Aleksandra Krunić (semifinals)

== Draw ==
Key

- Q = Qualifier
- WC = Wild card
- LL = Lucky loser
- Alt = Alternate
- ITF = ITF entry
- PR = Protected ranking
- SR = Special ranking
- SE = Special exempt
- JE = Junior exempt
- JR = Junior Accelerator Programme entrant
- CO = College Accelerator Programme entrant
- NG = Next Gen Accelerator Program entrant
- w/o = Walkover
- r = Retired
- d = Defaulted

=== Draw ===
First round
1	(Chinese Taipei) S-w Hsieh (Latvia) J Ostapenko	6	6
(Japan) M Kato (Hungary) F Stollár	4	3
(Ukraine) L Kichenok (United States) D Krawczyk	4	6	[10]
I Khromacheva; A Panova	6	4	[6]
3	(United States) A Muhammad (New Zealand) E Routliffe	6	3	[10]
(Spain) C Bucșa (United States) N Melichar-Martinez	4	6	[6]
Alt	(Argentina) N Fossa Huergo (Hungary) D Gálfi	3	4
(Australia) E Perez (Netherlands) D Schuurs	6	6
(Czech Republic) M Bouzková (Brazil) L Stefani	6	6
PR	(Norway) U Eikeri (Estonia) I Neel	3	0
(Czech Republic) T Valentová (Czech Republic) M Vondroušová	3	7^{7}	[9]
4	(Kazakhstan) A Danilina (Serbia) A Krunić	6	6^{5}	[11]
(Hungary) T Babos (Canada) L Fernandez	6	0	[10]
(United States) S Kenin (Germany) L Siegemund	3	6	[6]
WC	(Australia) K Birrell (Australia) M Joint	4	4
2	(Czech Republic) K Siniaková (China) S Zhang	6	6

Quarterfinals
1	(Chinese Taipei) S-w Hsieh (Latvia) J Ostapenko
(Ukraine) L Kichenok (United States) D Krawczyk	w/o
3	(United States) A Muhammad (New Zealand) E Routliffe	6	4	[3]
(Australia) E Perez (Netherlands) D Schuurs	3	6	[10]
(Czech Republic) M Bouzková (Brazil) L Stefani
4	(Kazakhstan) A Danilina (Serbia) A Krunić	w/o
(Hungary) T Babos (Canada) L Fernandez	7^{7}	6^{6}	[6]
2	(Czech Republic) K Siniaková (China) S Zhang	6^{3}	7^{7}	[10]

Semifinals
(Ukraine) L Kichenok (United States) D Krawczyk	6	3	[10]
(Australia) E Perez (Netherlands) D Schuurs	2	6	[7]
4	(Kazakhstan) A Danilina (Serbia) A Krunić	4	6	[8]
2	(Czech Republic) K Siniaková (China) S Zhang	6	2	[10]

Final
(Ukraine) L Kichenok (United States) D Krawczyk	1	4
2	(Czech Republic) K Siniaková (China) S Zhang	6	6
