= 2026 Adelaide International – Men's singles =

Men's singles
- 2026 Adelaide International

Final
- Champion: (Czech Republic) Tomáš Macháč
- Runner-up: (France) Ugo Humbert
- Score: 6–4, 6–7^{(2–7)}, 6–2

Details
- Draw: 28 (4 Q / 3 WC )
- Seeds: 8

Events
| Singles | men | women |
| Doubles | men | women |
- Adelaide International

Tomáš Macháč defeated Ugo Humbert the final, 6–4, 6–7^{(2–7)}, 6–2 to win the men's singles tennis title at the 2026 Adelaide International. It was his second ATP Tour title.

Félix Auger-Aliassime was the reigning champion, but did not participate this year.

== Seeds ==
The top four seeds received a bye into the second round.

1. (Spain) Alejandro Davidovich Fokina (semifinals)
2. (United States) Tommy Paul (semifinals)
3. (Argentina) Francisco Cerúndolo (second round)
4. (Netherlands) Tallon Griekspoor (second round)
5. (Monaco) Valentin Vacherot (quarterfinals)
6. (United States) Brandon Nakashima (withdrew)
7. (Greece) Stefanos Tsitsipas (first round)
8. (Czech Republic) Tomáš Macháč (champion)

== Draw ==
Key

- Q = Qualifier
- WC = Wild card
- LL = Lucky loser
- Alt = Alternate
- ITF = ITF entry
- PR = Protected ranking
- SR = Special ranking
- SE = Special exempt
- JE = Junior exempt
- JR = Junior Accelerator Programme entrant
- CO = College Accelerator Programme entrant
- NG = Next Gen Accelerator Program entrant
- w/o = Walkover
- r = Retired
- d = Defaulted

=== Finals ===
Semifinals
1 | (Spain) Alejandro Davidovich Fokina | 3 | 7 | 6^{4}
(France) Ugo Humbert | 6 | 5 | 7^{7}
8 | (Czech Republic) Tomáš Macháč | 2 | 6 | 6
2 | (United States) Tommy Paul | 6 | 3 | 3

Final
(France) Ugo Humbert | 4 | 7^{7} | 2
8 | (Czech Republic) Tomáš Macháč | 6 | 6^{2} | 6

=== Top half ===
First round
WC | (Australia) T Schoolkate | 4 | 4
WC | (Australia) R Hijikata | 6 | 6
WC | (Australia) T Kokkinakis | 3 | 6 | 7^{7}
(United States) S Korda | 6 | 3 | 6^{3}
(Serbia) M Kecmanović | 6^{5} | 4
5 | (Monaco) V Vacherot | 7^{7} | 6
(France) U Humbert | 6 | 7^{7}
(France) T Atmane | 3 | 6^{3}
(United States) E Quinn | 4 | 4
(Hungary) M Fucsovics | 6 | 6
(Bosnia and Herzegovina) D Džumhur | 6 | 4 | 5
Q | (Kazakhstan) A Shevchenko | 4 | 6 | 7

Second round
1 | (Spain) A Davidovich Fokina | 6 | 6
WC | (Australia) R Hijikata | 3 | 2
WC | (Australia) T Kokkinakis
5 | (Monaco) V Vacherot | w/o
4 | (Netherlands) T Griekspoor | 4 | 1
(France) U Humbert | 6 | 6
(Hungary) M Fucsovics | 3 | 6^{6}
Q | (Kazakhstan) A Shevchenko | 6 | 7^{8}

Quarterfinals
1 | (Spain) A Davidovich Fokina | 7^{7} | 6
5 | (Monaco) V Vacherot | 6^{4} | 2
(France) U Humbert | 6 | 6
Q | (Kazakhstan) A Shevchenko | 0 | 3

Semifinals
1 | (Spain) A Davidovich Fokina | 3 | 7 | 6^{4}
(France) U Humbert | 6 | 5 | 7^{7}

=== Bottom half ===
First round
8 | (Czech Republic) T Macháč | 6 | 6
WC | (Australia) J Duckworth | 3 | 3
LL | (United Kingdom) J Fearnley | 3 | 4
Q | (France) Q Halys | 6 | 6
(Germany) D Altmaier | 3 | 0
(Spain) J Munar | 6 | 6
7 | (Greece) S Tsitsipas | 6^{3} | 6^{5}
Q | (Australia) A Vukic | 7^{7} | 7^{7}
Q | (Italy) A Vavassori | 6 | 7^{7}
(Canada) G Diallo | 3 | 6^{4}
(United States) R Opelka | 6 | 7^{8}
(Australia) A Popyrin | 3 | 6^{6}

Second round
8 | (Czech Republic) T Macháč | 6 | 6
Q | (France) Q Halys | 4 | 2
(Spain) J Munar | 3 | 7 | 6
3 | (Argentina) F Cerúndolo | 6 | 5 | 4
Q | (Australia) A Vukic | 6 | 7^{7}
Q | (Italy) A Vavassori | 2 | 6^{5}
(United States) R Opelka | 4 | 4
2 | (United States) T Paul | 6 | 6

Quarterfinals
8 | (Czech Republic) T Macháč | 6 | 6
(Spain) J Munar | 4 | 4
Q | (Australia) A Vukic | 3 | 2
2 | (United States) T Paul | 6 | 6

Semifinals
8 | (Czech Republic) T Macháč | 2 | 6 | 6
2 | (United States) T Paul | 6 | 3 | 3

== Qualifying ==
=== Seeds ===
1. (Netherlands) Jesper de Jong (first round)
2. (United Kingdom) Jacob Fearnley (qualifying competition, lucky loser)
3. (Australia) Adam Walton (qualifying competition)
4. (Austria) Filip Misolic (qualifying competition)
5. (Belgium) Raphaël Collignon (first round)
6. (Australia) Aleksandar Vukic (qualified)
7. (France) Quentin Halys (qualified)
8. (Spain) Carlos Taberner (first round)

=== Qualifiers ===
1. (Italy) Andrea Vavassori
2. (Australia) Aleksandar Vukic
3. (France) Quentin Halys
4. (Kazakhstan) Alexander Shevchenko

=== Lucky loser ===
1. (United Kingdom) Jacob Fearnley

=== Draw ===
==== First qualifier ====
First round
1 | (Netherlands) Jesper de Jong | 6 | 1 | 3
(Argentina) Thiago Agustín Tirante | 3 | 6 | 6
Alt | (Italy) Andrea Vavassori | 6 | 7^{7}
5 | (Belgium) Raphaël Collignon | 3 | 6^{5}

Qualifying competition
(Argentina) Thiago Agustín Tirante | 2 | 3
Alt | (Italy) Andrea Vavassori | 6 | 6

==== Second qualifier ====
First round
2 | (United Kingdom) Jacob Fearnley | 7^{7} | 7^{7}
Alt | (Australia) Christopher O'Connell | 6^{4} | 6^{4}
(Italy) Luca Nardi | 7^{7} | 3 | 2
6 | (Australia) Aleksandar Vukic | 6^{4} | 6 | 6

Qualifying competition
2 | (United Kingdom) Jacob Fearnley | 4 | 7^{9} | 3
6 | (Australia) Aleksandar Vukic | 6 | 6^{7} | 6

==== Third qualifier ====
First round
3 | (Australia) Adam Walton | 6 | 3 | 7^{7}
WC | (Australia) Jake Delaney | 2 | 6 | 6^{2}
(France) Benjamin Bonzi | 3 | 4
7 | (France) Quentin Halys | 6 | 6

Qualifying competition
3 | (Australia) Adam Walton | 2 | 6^{9}
7 | (France) Quentin Halys | 6 | 7^{11}

==== Fourth qualifier ====
First round
4 | (Austria) Filip Misolic | 7 | 6
WC | (Australia) Daniel Jovanovski | 5 | 4
(Kazakhstan) Alexander Shevchenko | 6 | 6
8 | (Spain) Carlos Taberner | 3 | 2

Qualifying competition
4 | (Austria) Filip Misolic | 5 | 3
(Kazakhstan) Alexander Shevchenko | 7 | 6
