= 2026 Internationaux de Strasbourg – Doubles =

Doubles
- 2026 Internationaux de Strasbourg

Final
- Champions: (Canada) Gabriela Dabrowski (Brazil) Luisa Stefani
- Runners-up: (Norway) Ulrikke Eikeri (United States) Quinn Gleason
- Score: 7–5, 6–4

Events
Singles	Doubles
- Internationaux de Strasbourg

Defending champion Luisa Stefani and her partner Gabriela Dabrowski defeated Ulrikke Eikeri and Quinn Gleason in the final, 7–5, 6–4 to win the doubles title at the 2026 Internationaux de Strasbourg.

Tímea Babos and Stefani were the defending champions, but Babos retired from professional tennis in January 2026.

== Seeds ==
1. (Canada) Gabriela Dabrowski / (Brazil) Luisa Stefani (champions)
2. (New Zealand) Erin Routliffe / (China) Zhang Shuai (first round)
3. (Spain) Cristina Bucșa / (United States) Nicole Melichar-Martinez (first round)
4. (United States) Asia Muhammad / (Hungary) Fanny Stollár (quarterfinals)

== Draw ==
Key

- Q = Qualifier
- WC = Wild card
- LL = Lucky loser
- Alt = Alternate
- ITF = ITF entry
- PR = Protected ranking
- SR = Special ranking
- SE = Special exempt
- JE = Junior exempt
- JR = Junior Accelerator Programme entrant
- CO = College Accelerator Programme entrant
- NG = Next Gen Accelerator Program entrant
- w/o = Walkover
- r = Retired
- d = Defaulted

=== Draw ===
First round
1	(Canada) G Dabrowski (Brazil) L Stefani	6	3	[10]
(Croatia) A Ružić; O Selekhmeteva	2	6	[6]
(Ukraine) L Kichenok (United States) D Krawczyk	6	6
(Slovakia) T Mihalíková (United Kingdom) O Nicholls	2	1
4	(United States) A Muhammad (Hungary) F Stollár	6	4	[10]
(Japan) E Hozumi (Chinese Taipei) F-h Wu	3	6	[5]
E Alexandrova (Kazakhstan) A Danilina	7^{7}	5	[10]
(China) X Jiang (China) Y Xu	6^{5}	7	[4]
(Australia) M Joint (Australia) E Perez	6^{7}	6	[10]
PR	(Chinese Taipei) H-c Chan (Slovenia) A Klepač	7^{9}	2	[5]
M Kozyreva; A Panova	6	1	[10]
3	(Spain) C Bucșa (United States) N Melichar-Martinez	4	6	[4]
(Norway) U Eikeri (United States) Q Gleason	6	6
(France) E Cascino (France) E Jacquemot	4	2
(Czech Republic) J Malečková (Czech Republic) M Škoch	6	6
2	(New Zealand) E Routliffe (China) S Zhang	4	2

Quarterfinals
1	(Canada) G Dabrowski (Brazil) L Stefani	7	2	[10]
(Ukraine) L Kichenok (United States) D Krawczyk	5	6	[6]
4	(United States) A Muhammad (Hungary) F Stollár	5	6	[6]
E Alexandrova (Kazakhstan) A Danilina	7	3	[10]
(Australia) M Joint (Australia) E Perez	6	6
M Kozyreva; A Panova	4	1
(Norway) U Eikeri (United States) Q Gleason	6	7
(Czech Republic) J Malečková (Czech Republic) M Škoch	1	5

Semifinals
1	(Canada) G Dabrowski (Brazil) L Stefani	7	6
E Alexandrova (Kazakhstan) A Danilina	5	4
(Australia) M Joint (Australia) E Perez	2	4
(Norway) U Eikeri (United States) Q Gleason	6	6

Final
1	(Canada) G Dabrowski (Brazil) L Stefani	7	6
(Norway) U Eikeri (United States) Q Gleason	5	4
