= 2025 Hong Kong Tennis Open =

- Date: 27 October–2 November
- Edition: 12th
- Category: WTA 250
- Draw: 32S / 16D
- Prize money: $275,094
- Surface: Hard
- Location: Hong Kong
- Venue: Victoria Park Tennis Stadium

Champions

Singles
- (Canada) Victoria Mboko

Doubles
- (China) Jiang Xinyu / (China) Wang Yafan
- Hong Kong Tennis Open

The 2025 Hong Kong Tennis Open (also known as the Prudential Hong Kong Tennis Open for sponsorship reasons) was a professional women's tennis tournament played on outdoor hard courts. It was the 12th edition of the tournament, and part of the WTA 250 tournaments on the 2025 WTA Tour. It took place in Victoria Park, Hong Kong from 27 October to 2 November 2025.

== Champions ==
=== Singles ===
- (Canada) Victoria Mboko def. (Spain) Cristina Bucșa, 7–5, 6–7^{(9–11)}, 6–2

=== Doubles ===
- (China) Jiang Xinyu / (China) Wang Yafan def. (Japan) Momoko Kobori / (Thailand) Peangtarn Plipuech, 6–4, 6–2

== Singles main-draw entrants ==
=== Seeds ===
Country	Player	Rank^{1}	Seed
SUI	Belinda Bencic	13	1
CAN	Leylah Fernandez	22	2
CAN	Victoria Mboko	23	3
USA	Sofia Kenin	25	4
AUS	Maya Joint	32	5
	Anna Kalinskaya	38	6
ROU	Sorana Cîrstea	45	7
COL	Emiliana Arango	48	8

- ^{1} Rankings are as of 20 October 2025.

=== Other entrants ===
The following players received wildcards into the singles main draw:

- (Switzerland) Belinda Bencic
- (Hong Kong) Eudice Chong
- (Romania) Sorana Cîrstea
- (Hong Kong) Cody Wong

The following players received entry using a protected ranking:

- (Latvia) Anastasija Sevastova
- (China) Wang Yafan

The following players received entry from the qualifying draw:

- (Australia) Maddison Inglis
- (Japan) Momoko Kobori
- (China) Ma Yexin
- (Slovakia) Viktória Morvayová
- (Japan) Himeno Sakatsume
- Kristiana Sidorova

=== Withdrawals ===
- (Romania) Jaqueline Cristian → replaced by (Romania) Sorana Cîrstea
- (Australia) Priscilla Hon → replaced by (China) Zhang Shuai
- (Australia) Daria Kasatkina → replaced by (France) Varvara Gracheva
- (Japan) Naomi Osaka → replaced by (Japan) Moyuka Uchijima
- (United Kingdom) Emma Raducanu → replaced by Kamilla Rakhimova
- (Denmark) Clara Tauson → replaced by (Australia) Ajla Tomljanović

== Doubles main-draw entrants ==
=== Seeds ===
Country	Player	Country	Player	Rank^{1}	Seed
JPN	Eri Hozumi	TPE	Wu Fang-hsien	60	1
JPN	Shuko Aoyama	ESP	Cristina Bucșa	70	2
GBR	Emily Appleton	CHN	Tang Qianhui	147	3
USA	Sabrina Santamaria	JPN	Moyuka Uchijima	191	4

- ^{1} Rankings as of 20 October 2025.

=== Other entrants ===
The following pairs received wildcards into the main draw:

- (Hong Kong) Justine Leong / (Hong Kong) Maggie Ng
- (China) Ma Yexin / (China) Zhang Ying
