= 2026 Internationaux de Strasbourg – Singles =

Singles
- 2026 Internationaux de Strasbourg

Final
- Champion: (United States) Emma Navarro
- Runner-up: (Canada) Victoria Mboko
- Score: 6–0, 5–7, 6–2

Details
- Draw: 28 (4 Q / 4 WC)
- Seeds: 8

Events
Singles	Doubles
- Internationaux de Strasbourg

Emma Navarro defeated Victoria Mboko in the final, 6–0, 5–7, 6–2 to win the singles tennis title at the 2026 Internationaux de Strasbourg. It was her third WTA Tour title, and first on clay courts.

Elena Rybakina was the reigning champion, but did not participate this year.

== Seeds ==
The top four seeds received a bye into the second round.

1. (Canada) Victoria Mboko (final)
2. Ekaterina Alexandrova (second round)
3. (United States) Iva Jovic (second round)
4. (Denmark) Clara Tauson (second round)
5. (United States) Madison Keys (withdrew)
6. Liudmila Samsonova (first round)
7. (Canada) Leylah Fernandez (quarterfinals)
8. (Czech Republic) Marie Bouzková (quarterfinals)

== Draw ==
Key

- Q = Qualifier
- WC = Wild card
- LL = Lucky loser
- Alt = Alternate
- ITF = ITF entry
- PR = Protected ranking
- SR = Special ranking
- SE = Special exempt
- JE = Junior exempt
- JR = Junior Accelerator Programme entrant
- CO = College Accelerator Programme entrant
- NG = Next Gen Accelerator Program entrant
- w/o = Walkover
- r = Retired
- d = Defaulted

=== Finals ===
Semifinals
1/WC	(Canada) Victoria Mboko	7^{7}	3	6
(Romania) Jaqueline Cristian	6^{3}	6	2
(United States) Emma Navarro	6	6
(United States) Ann Li	1	3

Final
1/WC	(Canada) Victoria Mboko	0	7	2
(United States) Emma Navarro	6	5	6

=== Top half ===
First round
(China) Xin Wang	3	6^{4}
WC	(France) L Boisson	6	7^{7}
(Poland) M Fręch	7^{7}	6
Q	(Australia) T Gibson	6^{0}	3
WC	(France) L Jeanjean	1	5
7	(Canada) L Fernandez	6	7
Q	(United States) M Kessler	1	1
(Romania) J Cristian	6	6
(Greece) M Sakkari	3	1
(United States) P Stearns	6	6
Q	(Australia) D Kasatkina	7	6
6	L Samsonova	5	3

Second round
1/WC	(Canada) V Mboko	6	6
WC	(France) L Boisson	4	3
(Poland) M Fręch	4	6	4
7	(Canada) L Fernandez	6	3	6
4	(Denmark) C Tauson	1	5
(Romania) J Cristian	6	7
(United States) P Stearns	1	3
Q	(Australia) D Kasatkina	6	6

Quarterfinals
1/WC	(Canada) V Mboko	6	6
7	(Canada) L Fernandez	4	4
(Romania) J Cristian	7^{7}	3	6
Q	(Australia) D Kasatkina	6^{3}	6	2

Semifinals
1/WC	(Canada) V Mboko	7^{7}	3	6
(Romania) J Cristian	6^{3}	6	2

=== Bottom half ===
First round
LL	(China) S Zhang	2	7^{9}	7
(Spain) C Bucșa	6	6^{7}	5
WC	(France) D Parry	6	7^{7}
(United Kingdom) E Raducanu	4	6^{4}
(Czech Republic) S Bejlek	1	4
(United States) E Navarro	6	6
8	(Czech Republic) M Bouzková	7^{7}	6
(Czech Republic) K Siniaková	6^{3}	3
(Philippines) A Eala	6	5	3
Q	(Ukraine) O Oliynykova	3	7	6
(Australia) M Joint	1	2
(United States) A Li	6	6

Second round
LL	(China) S Zhang	6	7
WC	(France) D Parry	2	5
(United States) E Navarro	6	4	6
3	(United States) I Jovic	4	6	1
8	(Czech Republic) M Bouzková	3
Q	(Ukraine) O Oliynykova	1^{r}
(United States) A Li	4	6	6
2	E Alexandrova	6	4	3

Quarterfinals
LL	(China) S Zhang	6	6^{5}	2
(United States) E Navarro	2	7^{7}	6
8	(Czech Republic) M Bouzková	3	5
(United States) A Li	6	7

Semifinals
(United States) E Navarro	6	6
(United States) A Li	1	3

== Qualifying ==
=== Seeds ===
1. (United States) McCartney Kessler (qualified)
2. (Croatia) Antonia Ružić (first round)
3. (Australia) Talia Gibson (qualified)
4. (France) Elsa Jacquemot (first round)
5. (Australia) Daria Kasatkina (qualified)
6. (Ukraine) Oleksandra Oliynykova (qualified)
7. (China) Zhang Shuai (qualifying competition, lucky loser)
8. (United States) Sofia Kenin (first round)

=== Qualifiers ===
1. (United States) McCartney Kessler
2. (Ukraine) Oleksandra Oliynykova
3. (Australia) Talia Gibson
4. (Australia) Daria Kasatkina

=== Lucky loser ===
1. (China) Zhang Shuai

=== Qualifying draw ===
==== First qualifier ====
First round
1	(United States) McCartney Kessler	7	6
(Mexico) Renata Zarazúa	5	2
Oksana Selekhmeteva	1	6	6
8	(United States) Sofia Kenin	6	4	1

Qualifying competition
1	(United States) McCartney Kessler	6	6
Oksana Selekhmeteva	4	4

==== Second qualifier ====
First round
2	(Croatia) Antonia Ružić	4	3
(Kazakhstan) Yulia Putintseva	6	6
WC	(France) Ksenia Efremova	1	2
6	(Ukraine) Oleksandra Oliynykova	6	6

Qualifying competition
(Kazakhstan) Yulia Putintseva	4	4
6	(Ukraine) Oleksandra Oliynykova	6	6

==== Third qualifier ====
First round
3	(Australia) Talia Gibson	6	3	6
(Germany) Eva Lys	2	6	0
(Brazil) Beatriz Haddad Maia	4	2
7	(China) Zhang Shuai	6	6

Qualifying competition
3	(Australia) Talia Gibson	6	6
7	(China) Zhang Shuai	1	4

==== Fourth qualifier ====
First round
4	(France) Elsa Jacquemot	6	3	3
Anastasia Zakharova	4	6	6
WC	(Germany) Valentina Steiner	3	1
5	(Australia) Daria Kasatkina	6	6

Qualifying competition
Anastasia Zakharova	4	2
5	(Australia) Daria Kasatkina	6	6
