= 2026 Adelaide International – Women's singles =

Women's singles
- 2026 Adelaide International

Final
- Champion: Mirra Andreeva
- Runner-up: (Canada) Victoria Mboko
- Score: 6–3, 6–1

Details
- Draw: 30 (6 Q / 3 WC )
- Seeds: 8

Events
| Singles | men | women |
| Doubles | men | women |
- Adelaide International

Mirra Andreeva defeated Victoria Mboko in the final, 6–3, 6–1 to win the women's singles tennis title at the 2026 Adelaide International. It was her fourth WTA Tour singles title. At 18 years, 8 months, and 19 days, Andreeva became the youngest woman to win three different WTA Tour categories since the current format was introduced in 2009.

Madison Keys was the defending champion, but lost in the quarterfinals to Mboko.

== Seeds ==
The top two seeds received a bye into the second round.

1. (United States) Jessica Pegula (withdrew)
2. (United States) Madison Keys (quarterfinals)
3. Mirra Andreeva (champion)
4. Ekaterina Alexandrova (first round)
5. (Denmark) Clara Tauson (first round, retired)
6. (United States) Emma Navarro (quarterfinals)
7. Liudmila Samsonova (first round)
8. (Canada) Victoria Mboko (final)
9. Diana Shnaider (semifinals)

== Draw ==
Key

- Q = Qualifier
- WC = Wild card
- LL = Lucky loser
- Alt = Alternate
- ITF = ITF entry
- PR = Protected ranking
- SR = Special ranking
- SE = Special exempt
- JE = Junior exempt
- JR = Junior Accelerator Programme entrant
- CO = College Accelerator Programme entrant
- NG = Next Gen Accelerator Program entrant
- w/o = Walkover
- r = Retired
- d = Defaulted

=== Finals ===
Semifinals
3 | Mirra Andreeva | 6 | 6
9 | Diana Shnaider | 3 | 2
WC | (Australia) Kimberly Birrell | 2 | 1
8 | (Canada) Victoria Mboko | 6 | 6

Final
3 | Mirra Andreeva | 6 | 6
8 | (Canada) Victoria Mboko | 3 | 1

=== Top half ===
First round
(Spain) P Badosa | 6 | 3 | 4
LL | (Czech Republic) M Bouzková | 3 | 6 | 6
(Australia) M Joint | 7^{7} | 6
(United States) S Kenin | 6^{3} | 4
WC | (Australia) A Tomljanović | 7^{7} | 0
5 | (Denmark) C Tauson | 6^{5} | 0^{r}
9 | D Shnaider | 7 | 6
(Canada) L Fernandez | 5 | 3
LL | (Czech Republic) K Siniaková | 6 | 6
(Ukraine) D Yastremska | 0 | 1
Q | (Kazakhstan) Y Putintseva | 6 | 6
Q | (Hungary) D Gálfi | 4 | 4
WC | (Australia) E Jones | 3 | 3
6 | (United States) E Navarro | 6 | 6

Second round
3 | M Andreeva | 6 | 6
LL | (Czech Republic) M Bouzková | 3 | 1
(Australia) M Joint | 0
WC | (Australia) A Tomljanović | 2^{r}
9 | D Shnaider | 6 | 2 | 7
LL | (Czech Republic) K Siniaková | 1 | 6 | 5
Q | (Kazakhstan) Y Putintseva | 1 | 4
6 | (United States) E Navarro | 6 | 6

Quarterfinals
3 | M Andreeva | 6 | 6
(Australia) M Joint | 2 | 0
9 | D Shnaider | 6 | 6
6 | (United States) E Navarro | 3 | 3

Semifinals
3 | M Andreeva | 6 | 6
9 | D Shnaider | 3 | 2

=== Bottom half ===
First round
7 | L Samsonova | 1 | 6 | 2
PR | (Czech Republic) M Vondroušová | 6 | 4 | 6
WC | (Australia) K Birrell | 6 | 6
LL | (Austria) A Potapova | 4 | 4
(Australia) D Kasatkina | 7^{7} | 6
WC | (Greece) M Sakkari | 6^{2} | 4
Q | (Romania) J Cristian | 6 | 6
4 | E Alexandrova | 4 | 4
8 | (Canada) V Mboko | 5 | 6 | 6
PR | (Brazil) B Haddad Maia | 7 | 3 | 2
A Kalinskaya | 6 | 6
Q | (Romania) E-G Ruse | 0 | 3
(Latvia) J Ostapenko | 5 | 2^{r}
Q | (Czech Republic) T Valentová | 7 | 3

Second round
PR | (Czech Republic) M Vondroušová
WC | (Australia) K Birrell | w/o
(Australia) D Kasatkina | 4 | 0
Q | (Romania) J Cristian | 6 | 6
8 | (Canada) V Mboko | 6 | 3 | 7^{8}
A Kalinskaya | 2 | 6 | 6^{6}
Q | (Czech Republic) T Valentová | 4 | 1
2 | (United States) M Keys | 6 | 6

Quarterfinals
WC | (Australia) K Birrell | 5 | 6 | 7
Q | (Romania) J Cristian | 7 | 1 | 5
8 | (Canada) V Mboko | 6 | 4 | 6
2 | (United States) M Keys | 4 | 6 | 2

Semifinals
WC | (Australia) K Birrell | 2 | 1
8 | (Canada) V Mboko | 6 | 6

== Qualifying ==
=== Seeds ===
1. (Romania) Jaqueline Cristian (qualified)
2. (Romania) Sorana Cîrstea (qualified, withdrew)
3. (Germany) Laura Siegemund (first round, retired)
4. (Czech Republic) Marie Bouzková (qualifying competition, lucky loser)
5. (Czech Republic) Kateřina Siniaková (qualifying competition, lucky loser)
6. (United States) Ashlyn Krueger (first round)
7. (Austria) Anastasia Potapova (qualifying competition, lucky loser)
8. (Czech Republic) Tereza Valentová (qualified)
9. Anna Blinkova (first round)
10. (Kazakhstan) Yulia Putintseva (qualified)
11. (China) Zhang Shuai (first round)
12. (Romania) Elena-Gabriela Ruse (qualified)

=== Qualifiers ===
1. (Romania) Jaqueline Cristian
2. (Romania) ~~Sorana Cîrstea~~
3. (Czech Republic) Tereza Valentová
4. (Kazakhstan) Yulia Putintseva
5. (Romania) Elena-Gabriela Ruse
6. (Hungary) Dalma Gálfi

=== Lucky losers ===
1. (Czech Republic) Marie Bouzková
2. (Austria) Anastasia Potapova
3. (Czech Republic) Kateřina Siniaková

=== Draw ===
==== First qualifier ====
First round
1 | (Romania) Jaqueline Cristian | 7^{7} | 6
WC | (Australia) Sarah Mildren | 6^{4} | 2
(China) You Xiaodi | 2 | 6^{1}
7 | (Austria) Anastasia Potapova | 6 | 7^{7}

Qualifying competition
1 | (Romania) Jaqueline Cristian | 6 | 6
7 | (Austria) Anastasia Potapova | 1 | 3

==== Second qualifier ====
First round
2 | (Romania) Sorana Cîrstea | 6 | 6
Alt | (Norway) Ulrikke Eikeri | 3 | 3
(Uzbekistan) Kamilla Rakhimova | 7 | 5 | 6
11 | (China) Zhang Shuai | 5 | 7 | 4

Qualifying competition
2 | (Romania) Sorana Cîrstea | 7^{7} | 6
(Uzbekistan) Kamilla Rakhimova | 6^{5} | 3

==== Third qualifier ====
First round
3 | (Germany) Laura Siegemund | 5 | 0^{r}
PR | Vera Zvonareva | 7 | 4
WC | (Australia) Laquisa Khan | 2 | 3
8 | (Czech Republic) Tereza Valentová | 6 | 6

Qualifying competition
PR | Vera Zvonareva | 6^{2} | 0
8 | (Czech Republic) Tereza Valentová | 7^{7} | 6

==== Fourth qualifier ====
First round
4 | (Czech Republic) Marie Bouzková | 6 | 6
(Serbia) Aleksandra Krunić | 2 | 2
WC | (Australia) Tori Russell | 4 | 1
10 | (Kazakhstan) Yulia Putintseva | 6 | 6

Qualifying competition
4 | (Czech Republic) Marie Bouzková | 4 | 6^{0}
10 | (Kazakhstan) Yulia Putintseva | 6 | 7^{7}

==== Fifth qualifier ====
First round
5 | (Czech Republic) Kateřina Siniaková | 6 | 6
WC | (Australia) Emilie Chen | 2 | 0
(United Kingdom) Katie Swan | 7^{7} | 2 | 3
12 | (Romania) Elena-Gabriela Ruse | 6^{5} | 6 | 6

Qualifying competition
5 | (Czech Republic) Kateřina Siniaková | 6 | 3 | 2
12 | (Romania) Elena-Gabriela Ruse | 3 | 6 | 6

==== Sixth qualifier ====
First round
6 | (United States) Ashlyn Krueger | 6 | 1 | 4
(Hungary) Dalma Gálfi | 3 | 6 | 6
(Germany) Mina Hodzic | 6 | 7
9 | Anna Blinkova | 2 | 5

Qualifying competition
(Hungary) Dalma Gálfi | 6 | 6
(Germany) Mina Hodzic | 2 | 2
