= Saskatoon Challenger =

- 2023 Saskatoon Challenger

ITF Women's Tour
- Event name: Saskatoon Challenger
- Location: Saskatoon, Canada
- Venue: Riverside Badminton & Tennis Club
- Category: Women's World Tennis Tour
- Surface: Hard
- Draw: 32S/32Q/16D
- Prize money: $25,000

The Saskatoon Challenger is a tournament for professional female tennis players played on outdoor hard courts. The event is classified as a $25,000 Women's World Tennis Tour tournament and has been held in Saskatoon, Canada, since 2019. The tournament had previously been a $60,000 level tournament in 2023.

== Past finals ==
=== Singles ===
Year	Champion	Runner-up	Score
2026	(Canada) Teah Chavez	(Canada) Ariana Arseneault	2–6, 6–4, 6–4
2025	(Japan) Himeno Sakatsume	(Romania) Anca Todoni	7–6^{(7–1)}, 6–3
2024	(Canada) Kayla Cross	(Canada) Mia Kupres	4–6, 6–4, 6–4
2023	(Canada) Victoria Mboko	(United States) Emina Bektas	6–4, 6–4
2022	(Canada) Victoria Mboko	(United States) Madison Sieg	6–2, 6–0
2020–21	Tournament cancelled due to the COVID-19 pandemic		
2019	(Australia) Maddison Inglis	(Canada) Katherine Sebov	6–4, 2–6, 6–4

=== Doubles ===
Year	Champions	Runners-up	Score
2026	(United States) Alyssa Ahn (United States) Kaya Moe	(Canada) Teah Chavez (Canada) Scarlett Nicholson	6–4, 3–6, [10–8]
2025	(Japan) Saki Imamura (Japan) Hiroko Kuwata	(Canada) Raphaëlle Lacasse (Canada) Alexandra Vagramov	7–6^{(7–3)}, 3–6, [10–1]
2024	(Canada) Ariana Arseneault (Canada) Mia Kupres	(Japan) Hiroko Kuwata (United States) Maribella Zamarripa	6–4, 6–3
2023	(United States) Abigail Rencheli (United States) Alana Smith	(Canada) Stacey Fung (India) Karman Thandi	4–6, 6–4, [10–7]
2022	(Canada) Kayla Cross (Canada) Marina Stakusic	(United States) Kendra Bunch (Serbia) Katarina Kozarov	6–3, 7–6^{(7–4)}
2020–21	Tournament cancelled due to the COVID-19 pandemic		
2019	(Chinese Taipei) Hsu Chieh-yu (Mexico) Marcela Zacarías	(Japan) Haruka Kaji (Japan) Momoko Kobori	6–3, 6–2
