= Viktória Morvayová =

Slovak tennis player

- Country (sports): Slovakia
- Born: 10 March 2001 (age 25) Slovakia
- Plays: Right-handed
- Prize money: $98,223

Singles
- Career record: 236–226
- Career titles: 1 ITF
- Highest ranking: No. 299 (15 June 2026)
- Current ranking: No. 300 (13 July 2026)

Doubles
- Career record: 50–53
- Career titles: 4 ITF
- Highest ranking: No. 487 (19 June 2023)
- Current ranking: No. 1,501 (13 July 2026)
- Last updated on: 10 November 2025.

Viktória Morvayová (born 10 March 2001) is a Slovak tennis player.

Morvayová has a career-high singles ranking by the WTA of 299, achieved on 13 July 2026, and a best doubles ranking of world No. 487, achieved on 19 June 2023.

== Career ==
In August 2025, she won the first singles title of her career at the ITF W15 tournament held in Lu'an, China.

She made her WTA Tour main-draw debut at the 2025 Hong Kong Tennis Open, defeating England's Emily Appleton and Japan's Kyōka Okamura in the qualifiers to advance to the main draw. In the main draw, she defeated host Cody Wong of Hong Kong in the first round. In the next round, Morvayová lost to Maya Joint.

== ITF Circuit finals ==
=== Singles: 6 (1 title, 5 runner-ups) ===
Legend W25/35 tournaments (0–2) W15 tournaments (1–3)	Finals by surface Hard (1–5)

Result	W–L	Date	Tournament	Tier	Surface	Opponent	Score
Loss	0–1	Nov 2019	ITF Cancún, Mexico	W15	Hard	(Canada) Raphaëlle Lacasse	4–6, 5–7
Loss	0–2	Feb 2021	ITF Monastir, Tunisia	W15	Hard	(Poland) Weronika Falkowska	3–6, 3–6
Loss	0–3	Oct 2021	ITF Karaganda, Kazakhstan	W25	Hard (i)	(Uzbekistan) Nigina Abduraimova	7–6^{(3)}, 3–6, 1–6
Loss	0–4	Jul 2022	ITF Gurugram, India	W25	Hard	(India) Sahaja Yamalapalli	3–6, 6–7^{(5)}
Loss	0–5	Apr 2025	ITF Wuning, China	W15	Hard	(China) Yang Yidi	4–6, 4–6
Win	1–5	Aug 2025	ITF Lu'an, China	W15	Hard	(China) Sun Yingqun	2–6, 6–2, 6–1

=== Doubles: 7 (4 titles, 3 runner–ups) ===
Legend W25/35 tournaments (1–1) W15 tournaments (3–2)	Finals by surface Hard (3–3) Clay (1–0)

Result	W–L	Date	Tournament	Tier	Surface	Partner	Opponents	Score
Win	1–0	Oct 2017	ITF Antalya, Turkey	W15	Clay	(Slovenia) Nika Radišić	(Romania) Cristina Adamescu (Romania) Ilona Georgiana Ghioroaie	6–4, 6–4
Win	2–0	Feb 2021	ITF Monastir, Tunisia	W15	Hard	(Poland) Weronika Falkowska	(Romania) Karola Bejenaru (Czech Republic) Zdena Šafářová	6–4, 7–5
Loss	2–1	Feb 2021	ITF Monastir, Tunisia	W15	Hard	(Poland) Weronika Falkowska	(Romania) Karola Bejenaru (Romania) Ilona Georgiana Ghioroaie	6–1, 6–7^{(7)}, [10–12]
Loss	2–2	Oct 2022	ITF Fredericton, Canada	W25	Hard (i)	(Czech Republic) Anna Sisková	(Australia) Olivia Tjandramulia (Netherlands) Arianne Hartono	5–7, 1–6
Win	3–2	Jan 2023	GB Pro-Series Loughborough, United Kingdom	W25	Hard (i)	(Czech Republic) Anna Sisková	(Lithuania) Justina Mikulskytė (Netherlands) Bibiane Schoofs	6–3, 6–7^{(3)}, [10–6]
Loss	3–3	Apr 2025	ITF Wuning, China	W15	Hard	(China) Ren Yufei	(South Korea) Kim Na-ri (China) Ye Qiuyu	2–6, 5–7
Win	4–3	May 2025	ITF Estepona, Spain	W15	Hard	(Netherlands) Joy de Zeeuw	(Uzbekistan) Vlada Ekshibarova (Belgium) Clara Vlasselaer	4–6, 6–1, [10–5]
