= Victoria Mboko =

Canadian-Congolese tennis player (born 2006)

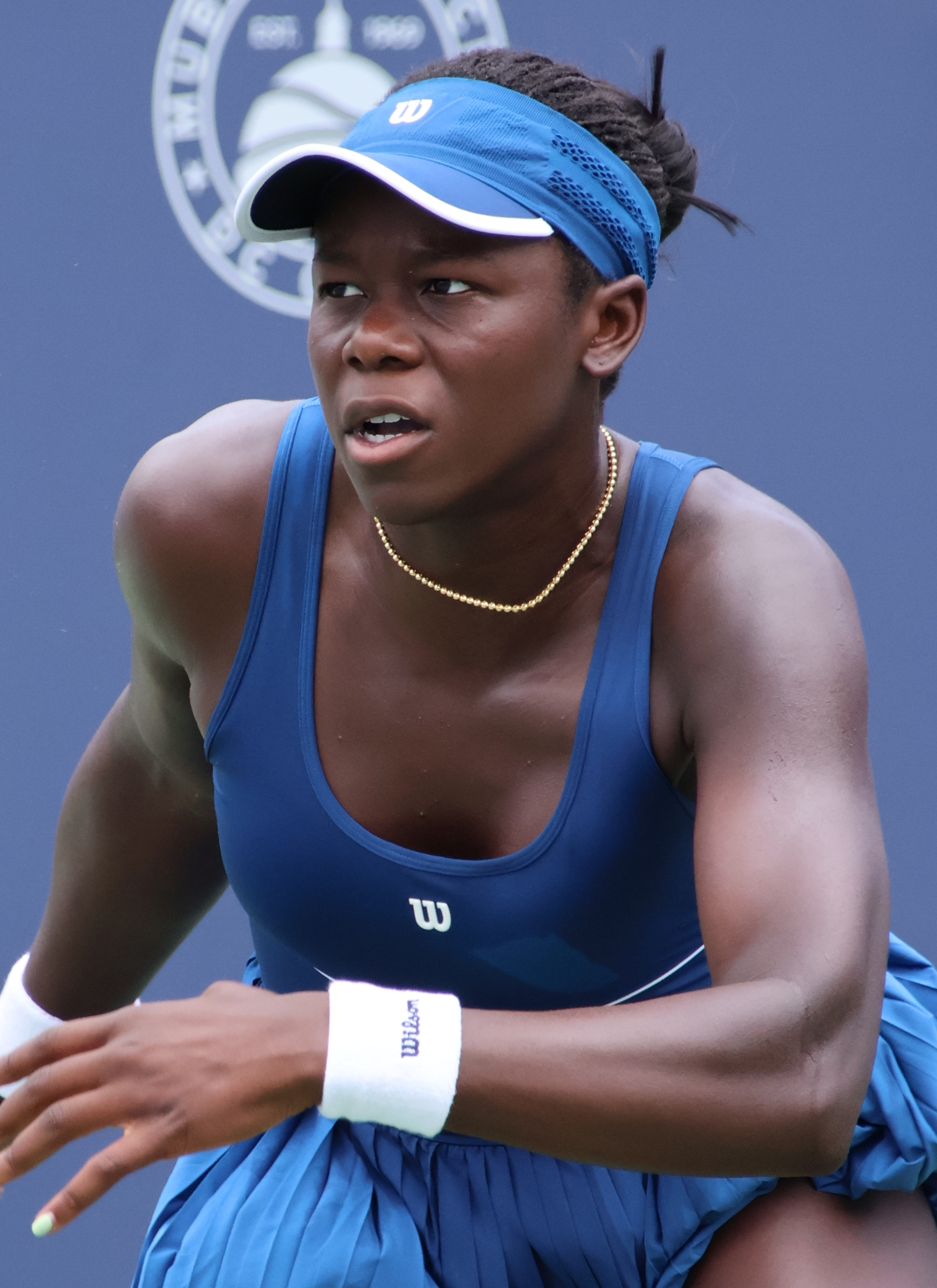
- Mboko at the 2025 Washington Open
- Full name: Victoria Vanessa Mboko
- Country (sports): Canada
- Residence: Burlington, Ontario, Canada
- Born: August 26, 2006 (age 20) Charlotte, North Carolina, US
- Height: 1.78 m (5 ft 10 in)
- Turned pro: 2022
- Plays: Right (two-handed backhand)
- Coach: Wim Fissette
- Prize money: $3,307,577

Singles
- Career record: 153–62
- Career titles: 2
- Highest ranking: No. 9 (March 16, 2026)
- Current ranking: No. 20 (November 2, 2026)

Grand Slam singles results
- Australian Open: 4R (2026)
- French Open: 3R (2025, 2026)
- Wimbledon: 2R (2025)
- US Open: 1R (2025)

Doubles
- Career record: 23–23
- Career titles: 0
- Highest ranking: No. 112 (July 20, 2026)
- Current ranking: No. 114 (August 3, 2026)

Grand Slam doubles results
- Australian Open: 2R (2026)
- Last updated on: August 9, 2026.

Victoria Vanessa "Vicky" Mboko (born August 26, 2006) is a Canadian professional tennis player. She has a career-high singles ranking of world No. 9 and a best doubles ranking of No. 112, achieved in 2026.

Mboko has won two WTA Tour singles titles, including a WTA 1000 event at the 2025 Canadian Open. She represents Canada at the Billie Jean King Cup. She is only the fourth Canadian woman in WTA Tour history (after Carling Bassett-Seguso, Eugenie Bouchard, and Bianca Andreescu) to reach the top 10.

== Early life and background ==
Mboko was born in Charlotte, North Carolina, US, on August 26, 2006. Her parents, Cyprien Mboko and Godee Kitadi, had moved from the Democratic Republic of the Congo to the United States due to political turmoil. The family subsequently settled in Toronto, Ontario, Canada, when she was two months old.

She is the youngest of four siblings, all of whom play tennis; her sister Gracia and brother Kevin played at the college level. Inspired by her older siblings, Victoria began playing tennis around the age of three or four.

== Career ==
=== 2022–2023: Early years ===
Mboko made her WTA Tour main-draw debut at the 2022 Canadian Open in the doubles draw, partnering Kayla Cross. She made her first singles appearance as a wildcard at the 2022 Championnats de Granby, losing to Rebecca Marino. Her first professional singles title came at the W25 tournament in Saskatoon in 2022, a title she successfully defended in 2023. Her progress in earlier years had been affected by injuries.

Mboko reached the finals of two junior Grand Slam tournaments in 2022, losing in doubles competitions at both the Australian Open and Wimbledon.

=== 2025: Montreal title, top 20, Newcomer of the Year ===
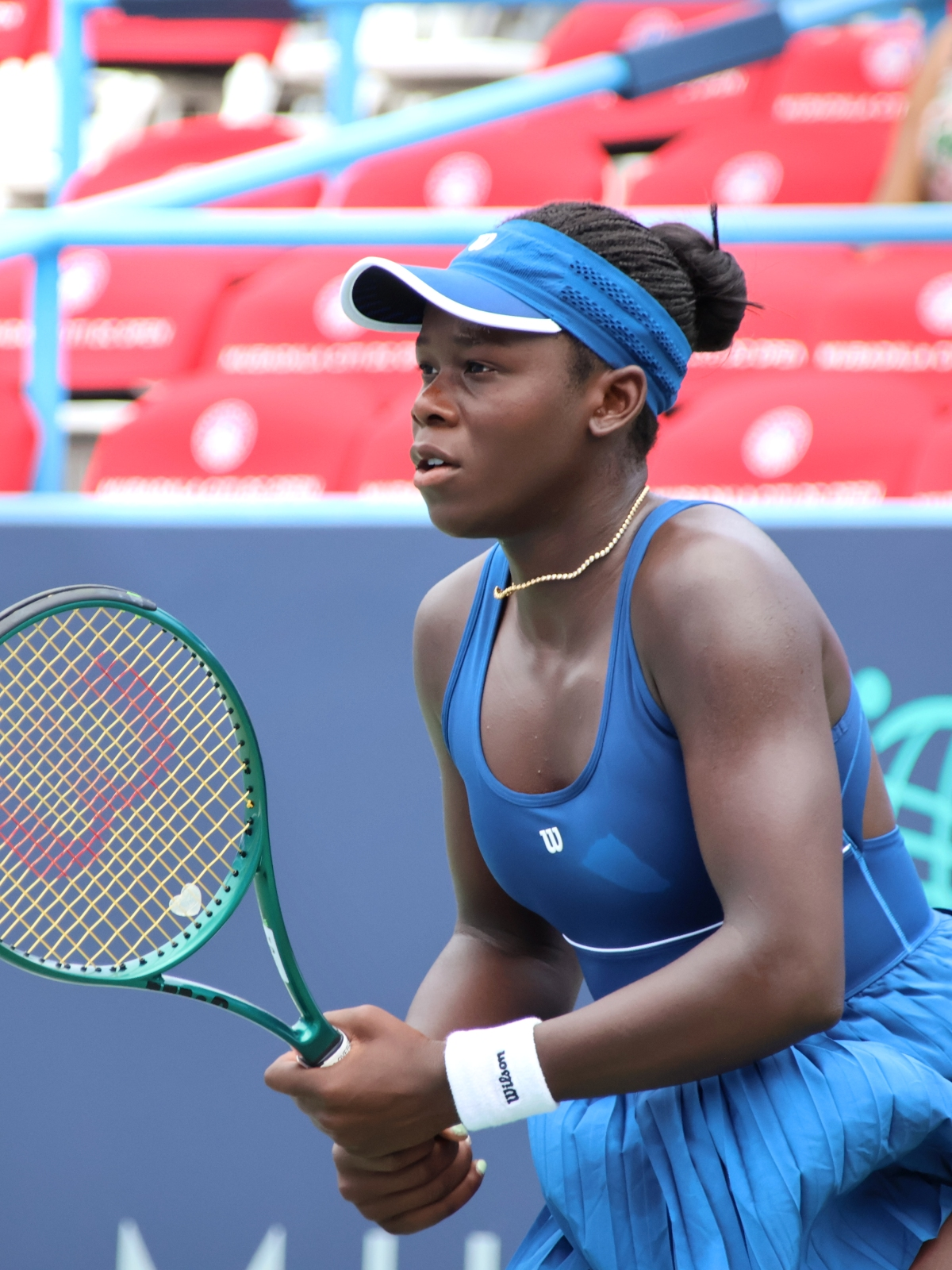
Victoria Mboko playing in the first round of the 2025 Washington Open

In January and February, Mboko won 22 successive matches without dropping a set to claim four ITF Circuit singles titles at tournaments in Le Lamentin, Martinique; Petit-Bourg, Guadeloupe; Rome, United States; and Manchester, United Kingdom. Her 20 consecutive ITF-level main-draw match wins during this period set a new record for Canadian women since the ITF began keeping such records in 1994. She won a fifth ITF title of the year in March at the W75 tournament in Porto, Portugal, defeating Harriet Dart in the final. By early May 2025, her win-loss record for the season was 33–3. This series of results contributed to her entering the WTA top 200 for the first time, reaching a career-high ranking of No. 156 on March 31, 2025.

She was given a wildcard entry into the Miami Open, her first WTA 1000 main draw. There, she recorded her first WTA Tour-level win by defeating Camila Osorio in the first round, before losing in the second round to 10th seed Paula Badosa in a third set tiebreak. Mboko then made her debut for the Canada Billie Jean King Cup team against Romania in the qualifying round of the BJK Cup held in Tokyo, recording a win over Miriam Bulgaru in the opening singles match.

She qualified for the Italian Open and defeated wildcard entrant Arianna Zucchini in the first round. In the second round, she lost to fourth seed Coco Gauff, in three sets. Mboko made her French Open debut, after winning all three qualifying matches in straight sets. There, she defeated Lulu Sun and Eva Lys, recording her first two major main-draw wins. She made her debut at Wimbledon, as a lucky loser, but lost to Hailey Baptiste in the second round.

At the Canadian Open, Mboko reached the quarterfinals by upsetting top seed and world No. 2, Coco Gauff, in straight sets. She followed that win by defeating Jéssica Bouzas Maneiro to reach the semifinals. She became the youngest player to reach the semifinals in Canada since Belinda Bencic in 2015. After saving a match point, Mboko defeated ninth seed Elena Rybakina in three sets to reach her first WTA Tour final. In the final, she defeated Naomi Osaka in three sets to lift her first career trophy, becoming the third Canadian to win the home-country tournament and the first to do it in Montréal. As a result, she reached the top 25 at No. 24 in the WTA singles rankings on 11 August.

In November, Mboko claimed her second WTA Tour title at the Hong Kong Open, defeating Cristina Bucșa in 2 hours and 49 minutes, making it the longest WTA tournament final of 2025. She subsequently made her top 20 debut as No. 18 in the WTA rankings, on 3 November.

At the end of the season, Mboko was voted the WTA Newcomer of the Year.

=== 2026: Top 10 debut, Doha final, major fourth round ===
Mboko started her 2026 season by reaching the final at the Adelaide International, defeating second seed and reigning Australian Open champion Madison Keys en route. She lost the championship match to third seed Mirra Andreeva in straight sets. At the Australian Open, Mboko advanced to the second week of a major for the first time in her career, where she would end up falling to the world No. 1, Aryna Sabalenka, in their first ever meeting.

Mboko earned back-to-back top-10 wins for the first time in her career over No. 7, Mirra Andreeva, and Australian Open champion, No. 3, Elena Rybakina, on the way to her second WTA 1000 final at the Qatar Ladies Open. Despite losing to Karolina Muchová, Mboko would subsequently make her top-10 debut on February 16, 2026, only 350 days, after making her top-200 debut, becoming the fastest player to accomplish this feat since Jennifer Capriati did so in 203 days in 1990.

In March, she reached the quarterfinals at the WTA 1000 tournaments in Indian Wells and Miami, losing to Aryna Sabalenka and Karolina Muchová, respectively. Mboko withdrew from the Canadian squad for their BJK Cup qualifier against Kazakhstan due to having surgery to remove four wisdom teeth.

In May, Mboko hired Wim Fissette. She reached the finals of the Strasbourg losing to Emma Navarro in three sets. At the French Open, she lost in the third round to Madison Keys in three sets.

In June, Mboko played doubles with Serena Williams at the 2026 Queen's Club Championships. They won their first-round match over third seeds Erin Routliffe and Nicole Melichar-Martinez in two sets. The pair advanced to the quarterfinals, where they were scheduled to face Laura Siegemund and Leylah Fernandez but could not compete due to injury.

== Playing style ==
Mboko plays right-handed with a two-handed backhand. According to the WTA, her game is built around a strong serve and a counterpunching backhand, and she also utilizes drop shots regularly. She has credited Tennis Canada and the support from fellow Canadian players for her development.

== Career statistics ==
=== Grand Slam tournament performance timeline ===
Key
W	F	SF	QF	#R	RR	Q#	DNQ	A	NH

(W) winner; (F) finalist; (SF) semifinalist; (QF) quarterfinalist; (#R) rounds 4, 3, 2, 1; (RR) round-robin stage; (Q#) qualification round; (DNQ) did not qualify; (A) absent; (NH) not held; (SR) strike rate (events won / competed); (W–L) win–loss record.
To avoid confusion and double counting, these charts are updated at the conclusion of a tournament or when the player's participation has ended.

==== Singles ====
Tournament	2025	2026	SR	W–L
Australian Open	A	4R	0 / 1	3–1
French Open	3R	3R	0 / 2	4–2
Wimbledon	2R	A	0 / 1	1–1
US Open	1R	A	0 / 1	0–1
Win–loss	3–3	5–2	0 / 5	8–5

== Awards ==
2025

- WTA Awards – Newcomer of the Year
- Tennis Canada Women's Player of the Year
