= 2025 WTA Tour =

Women's tennis circuit

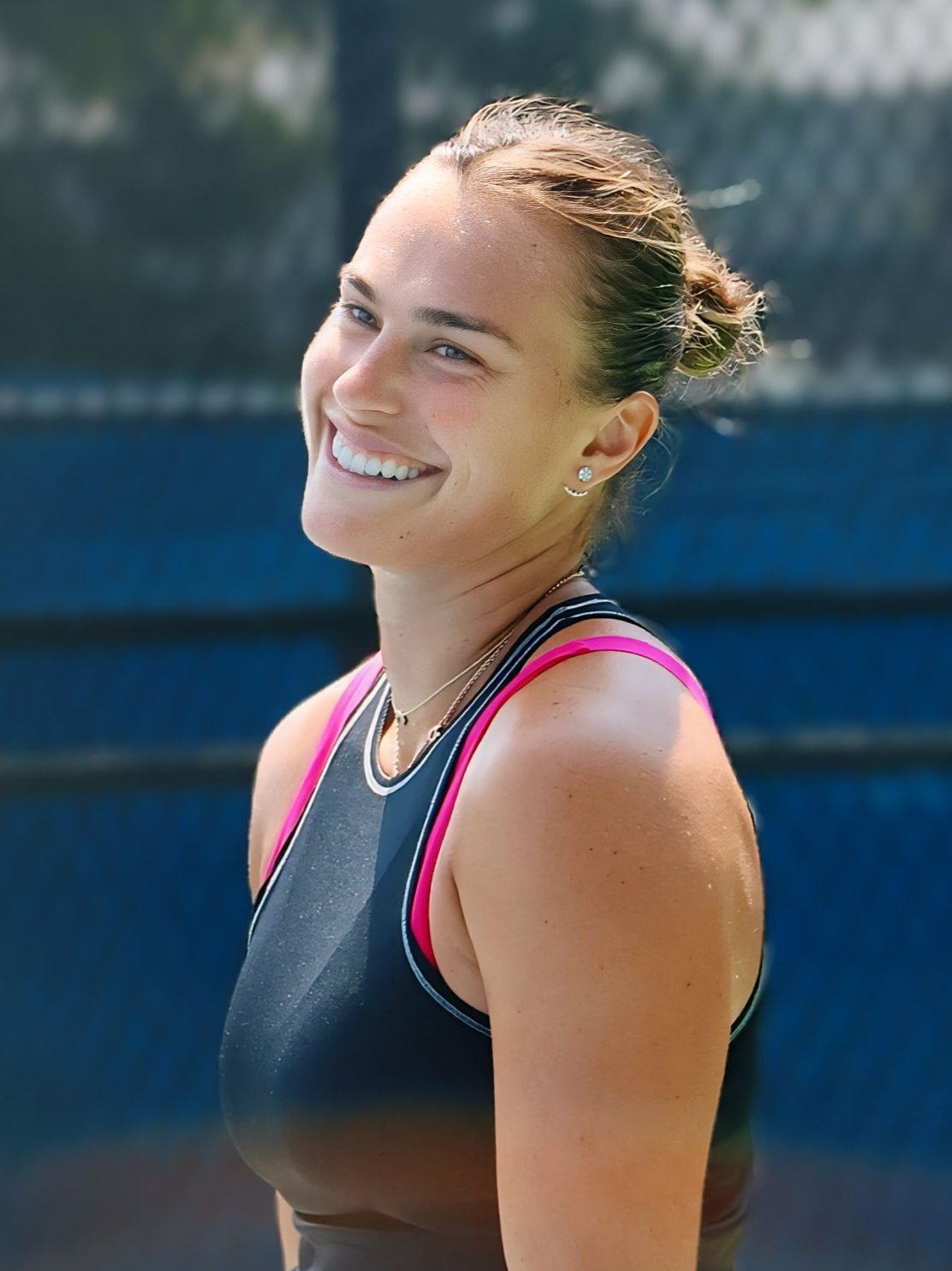
- Aryna Sabalenka finished the year as world No. 1 for the second time in her career. She won four tournaments during the season, including a major at the US Open. She also won two WTA 1000 events, and finished runner-up at two other majors, the Australian Open and French Open.

Details
- Duration: 27 December 2024 – 8 November 2025
- Edition: 55th
- Tournaments: 56
- Categories: Grand Slam (4); WTA Finals; WTA 1000 (10); WTA 500 (17); WTA 250 (21); Billie Jean King Cup; United Cup; Hopman Cup

Achievements (singles)
- Most titles: Aryna Sabalenka (4)
- Most finals: Aryna Sabalenka (9)
- Prize money leader: Aryna Sabalenka ($15,008,519)
- Points leader: Aryna Sabalenka (10,870)

Awards
- Player of the year: Aryna Sabalenka
- Doubles team of the year: (Czech Republic) Katerina Siniaková (United States) Taylor Townsend
- Most improved player of the year: (United States) Amanda Anisimova
- Newcomer of the year: (Canada) Victoria Mboko
- Comeback player of the year: (Switzerland) Belinda Bencic

The 2025 WTA Tour (branded as the 2025 Hologic WTA Tour for sponsorship reasons) was the global elite women's professional tennis circuit organized by the Women's Tennis Association (WTA) for the 2025 tennis season. The 2025 WTA Tour calendar comprised the Grand Slam tournaments (supervised by the International Tennis Federation (ITF)), the WTA 1000 tournaments, the WTA 500 tournaments, the WTA 250 tournaments, the Billie Jean King Cup (organized by the ITF), the year-end championships (the WTA Finals), the team event United Cup (combined event with ATP), and the team event Hopman Cup.

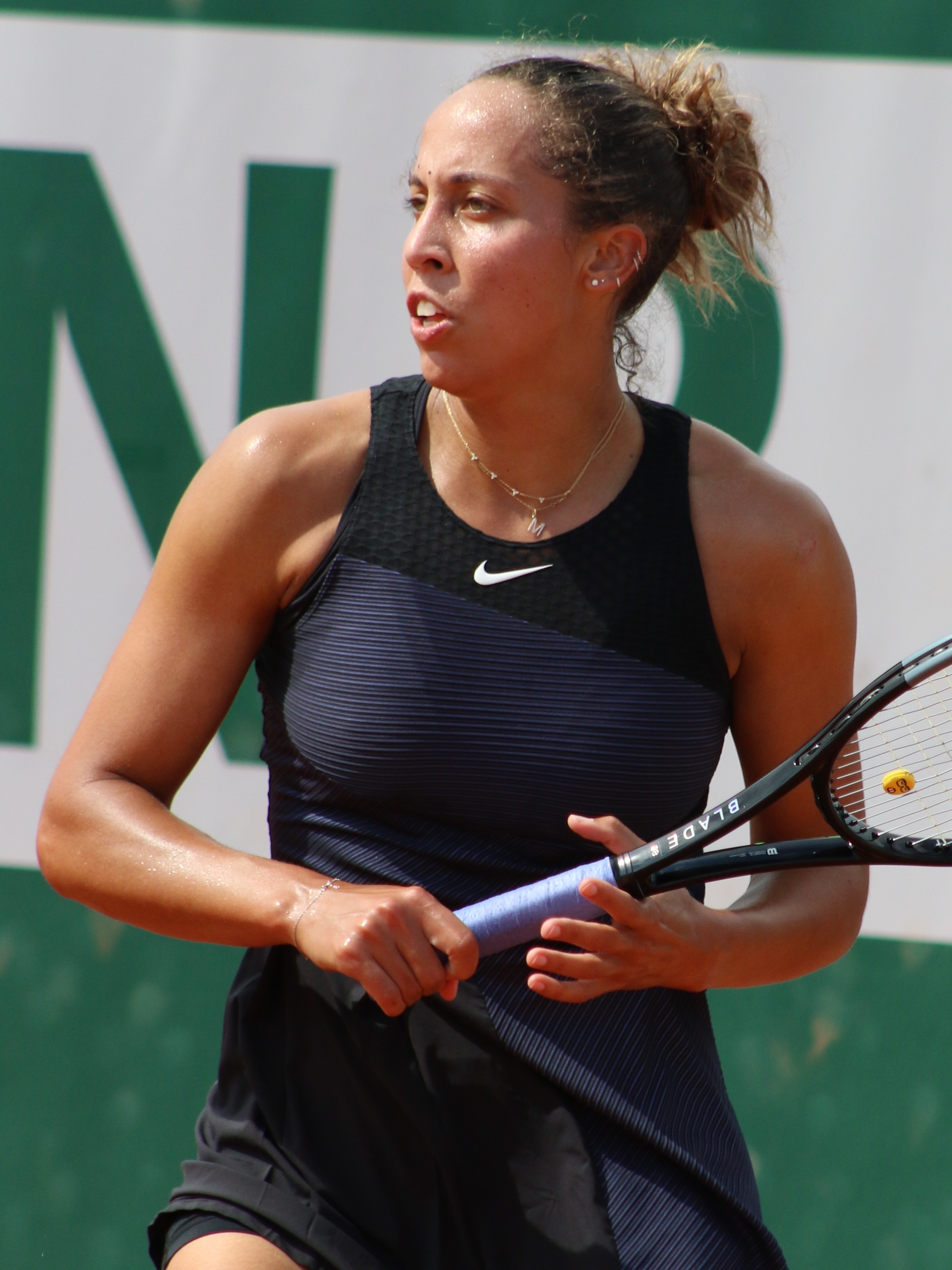
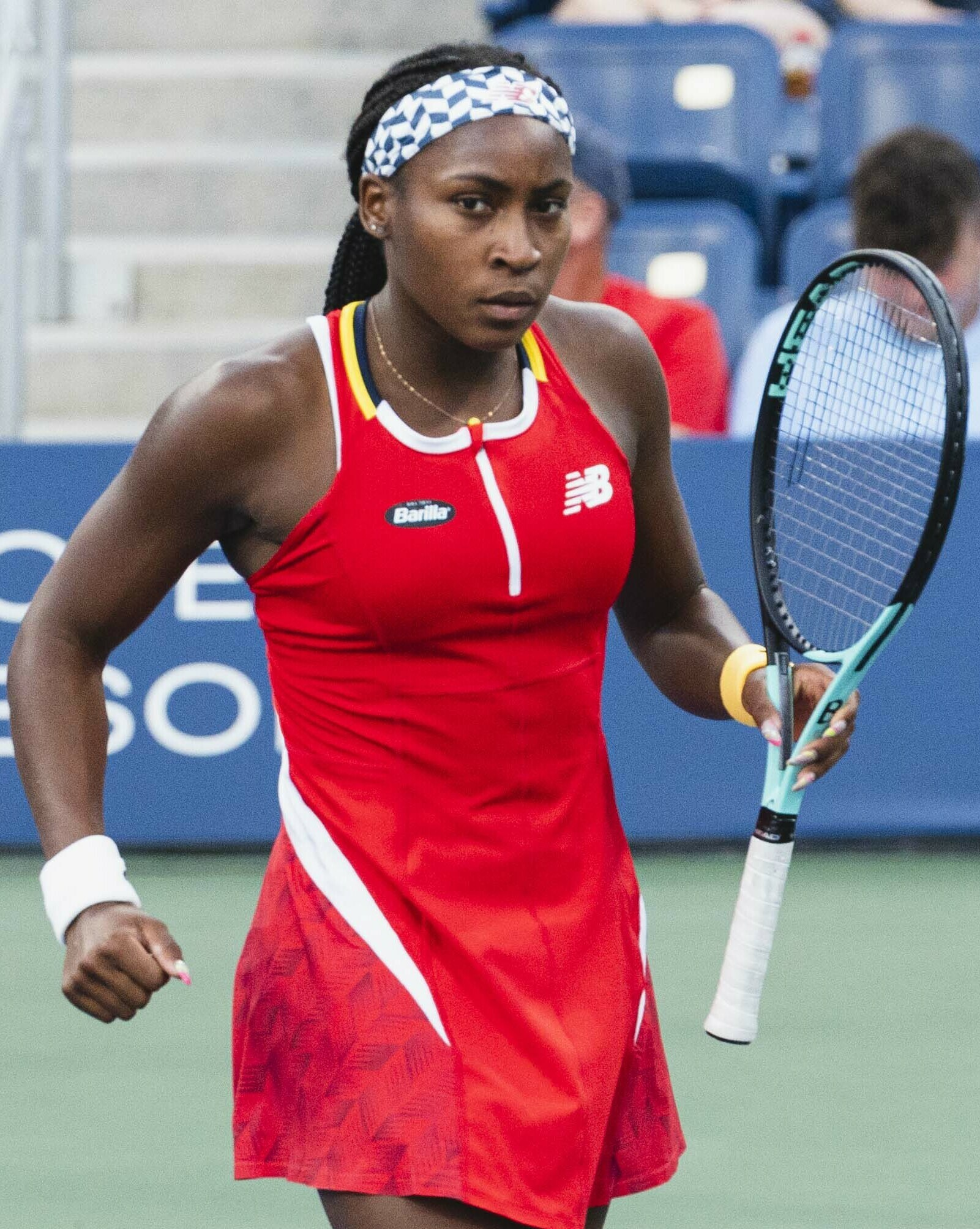
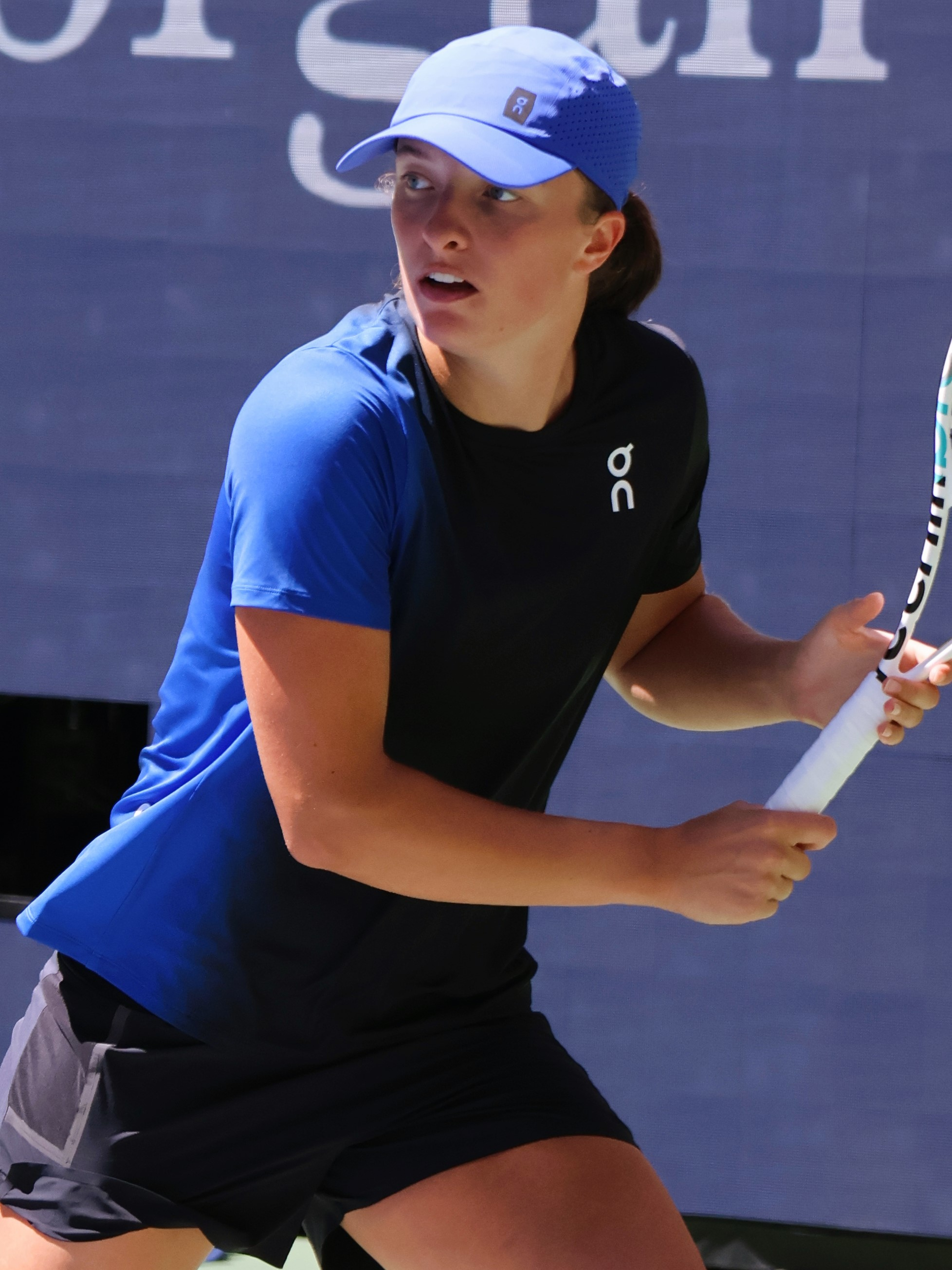
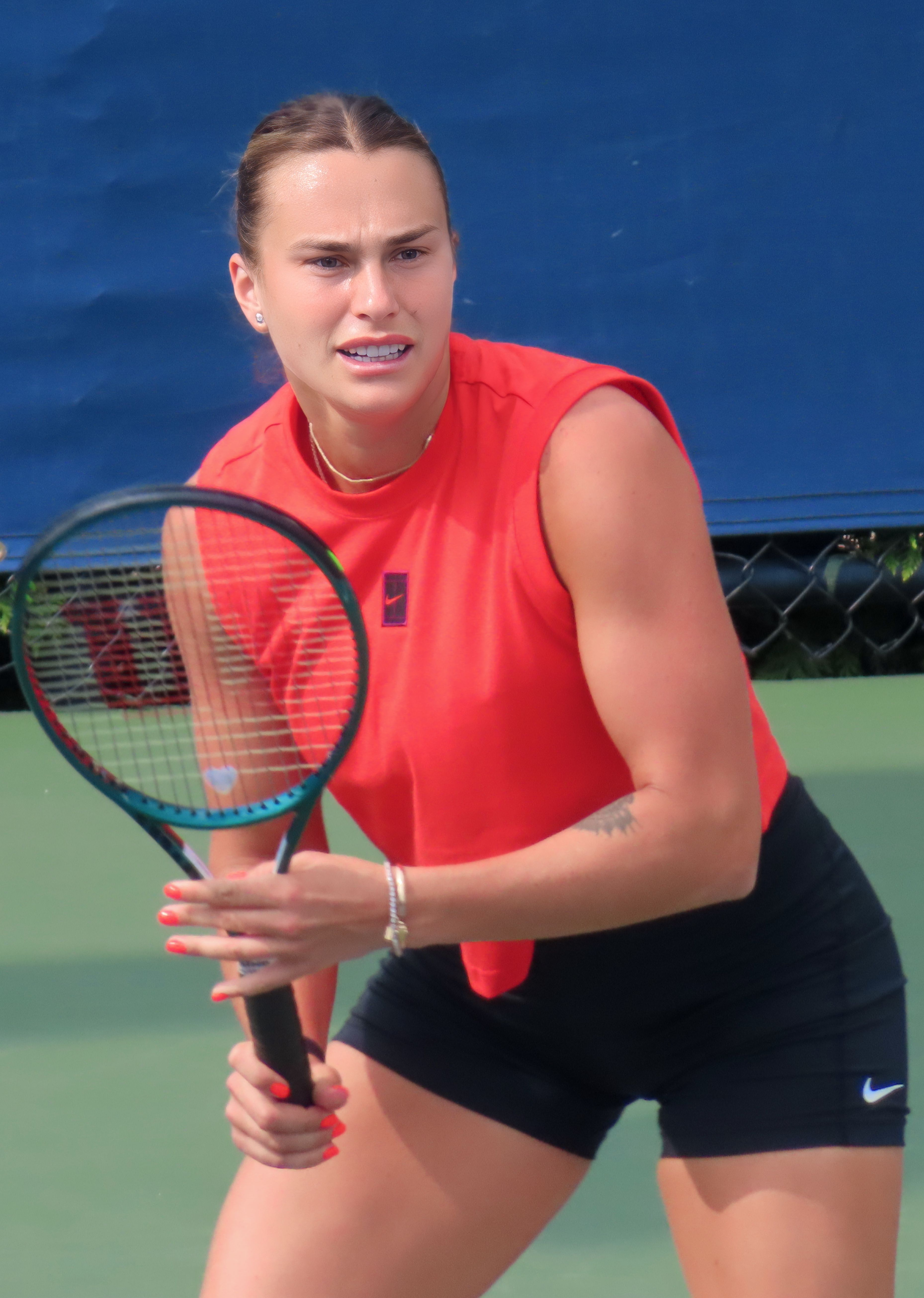
Madison Keys (far left) won the Australian Open; Coco Gauff (middle left) won the French Open; Iga Świątek (middle right) took the Wimbledon title; Aryna Sabalenka (far right) won the US Open.

== Schedule ==
This is the complete schedule of events on the 2025 calendar.

Key

Grand Slam
WTA Finals
WTA 1000
WTA 500
WTA 250
Team events

=== January ===
Week	Tournament	Champions	Runners-up	Semifinalists	Quarterfinalists
Dec 30	United Cup; Perth/Sydney, Australia; United Cup; Hard – $5,125,000 – 18 teams	(United States) United States; 2–0	Poland	Kazakhstan; Czech Republic	Germany (United Kingdom) Great Britain; China; Italy
Dec 30	Brisbane International; Brisbane, Australia; WTA 500; Hard – $1,520,600 – 48S/24Q/16D; Singles – Doubles	Aryna Sabalenka; 4–6, 6–3, 6–2	Polina Kudermetova	Mirra Andreeva (Ukraine) Anhelina Kalinina	(Czech Republic) Marie Bouzková (Tunisia) Ons Jabeur (United States) Ashlyn Krueger (Australia) Kimberly Birrell
Dec 30	Brisbane International; Brisbane, Australia; WTA 500; Hard – $1,520,600 – 48S/24Q/16D; Singles – Doubles	Mirra Andreeva; Diana Shnaider; 7–6^{(8–6)}, 7–5	(Australia) Priscilla Hon; Anna Kalinskaya	Mirra Andreeva (Ukraine) Anhelina Kalinina	(Czech Republic) Marie Bouzková (Tunisia) Ons Jabeur (United States) Ashlyn Krueger (Australia) Kimberly Birrell
Dec 30	Auckland Open; Auckland, New Zealand; WTA 250; Hard – $275,094 – 32S/24Q/16D; Singles – Doubles	(Denmark) Clara Tauson; 4–6, 0–0, ret.	(Japan) Naomi Osaka	(United States) Robin Montgomery (United States) Alycia Parks	(United States) Madison Keys (United States) Bernarda Pera (United States) Katie Volynets (United States) Hailey Baptiste
Dec 30	Auckland Open; Auckland, New Zealand; WTA 250; Hard – $275,094 – 32S/24Q/16D; Singles – Doubles	(China) Jiang Xinyu (Chinese Taipei) Wu Fang-hsien; 6–3, 6–4	(Serbia) Aleksandra Krunić (United States) Sabrina Santamaria	(United States) Robin Montgomery (United States) Alycia Parks	(United States) Madison Keys (United States) Bernarda Pera (United States) Katie Volynets (United States) Hailey Baptiste
Jan 6	Adelaide International; Adelaide, Australia; WTA 500; Hard – $1,064,510 – 30S/24Q/16D; Singles – Doubles	(United States) Madison Keys; 6–3, 4–6, 6–1	(United States) Jessica Pegula	(Kazakhstan) Yulia Putintseva; Liudmila Samsonova	(United States) Ashlyn Krueger; Diana Shnaider; Daria Kasatkina (United States) Emma Navarro
Jan 6	Adelaide International; Adelaide, Australia; WTA 500; Hard – $1,064,510 – 30S/24Q/16D; Singles – Doubles	(China) Guo Hanyu; Alexandra Panova; 7–5, 6–4	(Brazil) Beatriz Haddad Maia (Germany) Laura Siegemund	(Kazakhstan) Yulia Putintseva; Liudmila Samsonova	(United States) Ashlyn Krueger; Diana Shnaider; Daria Kasatkina (United States) Emma Navarro
Jan 6	Hobart International; Hobart, Australia; WTA 250; Hard – $275,094 – 32S/24Q/16D; Singles – Doubles	(United States) McCartney Kessler; 6–4, 3–6, 6–0	(Belgium) Elise Mertens	(Armenia) Elina Avanesyan (Australia) Maya Joint	(Ukraine) Dayana Yastremska (United States) Amanda Anisimova (United States) Sofia Kenin; Veronika Kudermetova
Jan 6	Hobart International; Hobart, Australia; WTA 250; Hard – $275,094 – 32S/24Q/16D; Singles – Doubles	(China) Jiang Xinyu (Chinese Taipei) Wu Fang-hsien; 6–1, 7–6^{(8–6)}	(Romania) Monica Niculescu (Hungary) Fanny Stollár	(Armenia) Elina Avanesyan (Australia) Maya Joint	(Ukraine) Dayana Yastremska (United States) Amanda Anisimova (United States) Sofia Kenin; Veronika Kudermetova
13 Jan; 20 Jan	Australian Open; Melbourne, Australia; Grand Slam; Hard – A$43,250,000; 128S/128Q/64D/32X; Singles – Doubles – Mixed	(United States) Madison Keys; 6–3, 2–6, 7–5	Aryna Sabalenka	(Spain) Paula Badosa (Poland) Iga Świątek	Anastasia Pavlyuchenkova (United States) Coco Gauff (Ukraine) Elina Svitolina (United States) Emma Navarro
13 Jan; 20 Jan	Australian Open; Melbourne, Australia; Grand Slam; Hard – A$43,250,000; 128S/128Q/64D/32X; Singles – Doubles – Mixed	(Czech Republic) Kateřina Siniaková (United States) Taylor Townsend; 6–2, 6–7^{(4–7)}, 6–3	(Chinese Taipei) Hsieh Su-wei (Latvia) Jeļena Ostapenko	(Spain) Paula Badosa (Poland) Iga Świątek	Anastasia Pavlyuchenkova (United States) Coco Gauff (Ukraine) Elina Svitolina (United States) Emma Navarro
13 Jan; 20 Jan	Australian Open; Melbourne, Australia; Grand Slam; Hard – A$43,250,000; 128S/128Q/64D/32X; Singles – Doubles – Mixed	(Australia) Olivia Gadecki (Australia) John Peers; 3–6, 6–4, [10–6]	(Australia) Kimberly Birrell (Australia) John-Patrick Smith	(Spain) Paula Badosa (Poland) Iga Świątek	Anastasia Pavlyuchenkova (United States) Coco Gauff (Ukraine) Elina Svitolina (United States) Emma Navarro
Jan 27	Linz Open; Linz, Austria; WTA 500; Hard (i) – $1,064,510 – 28S/24Q/16D; Singles – Doubles	Ekaterina Alexandrova; 6–2, 3–6, 7–5	(Ukraine) Dayana Yastremska	(Czech Republic) Karolína Muchová (Denmark) Clara Tauson	Anastasia Potapova (Croatia) Petra Martić (Greece) Maria Sakkari; Anna Blinkova
Jan 27	Linz Open; Linz, Austria; WTA 500; Hard (i) – $1,064,510 – 28S/24Q/16D; Singles – Doubles	(Hungary) Tímea Babos (Brazil) Luisa Stefani; 3–6, 7–5, [10–4]	(Ukraine) Lyudmyla Kichenok (Ukraine) Nadiia Kichenok	(Czech Republic) Karolína Muchová (Denmark) Clara Tauson	Anastasia Potapova (Croatia) Petra Martić (Greece) Maria Sakkari; Anna Blinkova
Jan 27	Singapore Open; Singapore, Singapore; WTA 250; Hard (i) – $275,094 – 32S/16Q/16D; Singles – Doubles	(Belgium) Elise Mertens; 6–1, 6–4	(United States) Ann Li	Anna Kalinskaya (China) Wang Xinyu	(Thailand) Mananchaya Sawangkaew (Australia) Kimberly Birrell (Switzerland) Jil Teichmann (Colombia) Camila Osorio
Jan 27	Singapore Open; Singapore, Singapore; WTA 250; Hard (i) – $275,094 – 32S/16Q/16D; Singles – Doubles	(United States) Desirae Krawczyk (Mexico) Giuliana Olmos; 7–5, 6–0	(China) Wang Xinyu (China) Zheng Saisai	Anna Kalinskaya (China) Wang Xinyu	(Thailand) Mananchaya Sawangkaew (Australia) Kimberly Birrell (Switzerland) Jil Teichmann (Colombia) Camila Osorio

=== February ===
Week	Tournament	Champions	Runners-up	Semifinalists	Quarterfinalists
Feb 3	Abu Dhabi Open; Abu Dhabi, United Arab Emirates; WTA 500; Hard – $1,064,510 – 28S/24Q/16D; Singles – Doubles	(Switzerland) Belinda Bencic; 4–6, 6–1, 6–1	(United States) Ashlyn Krueger	(Kazakhstan) Elena Rybakina (Czech Republic) Linda Nosková	(Tunisia) Ons Jabeur (Czech Republic) Markéta Vondroušová (Canada) Leylah Fernandez (Poland) Magda Linette
Feb 3	Abu Dhabi Open; Abu Dhabi, United Arab Emirates; WTA 500; Hard – $1,064,510 – 28S/24Q/16D; Singles – Doubles	(Latvia) Jeļena Ostapenko (Australia) Ellen Perez; 6–2, 6–1	(France) Kristina Mladenovic (China) Zhang Shuai	(Kazakhstan) Elena Rybakina (Czech Republic) Linda Nosková	(Tunisia) Ons Jabeur (Czech Republic) Markéta Vondroušová (Canada) Leylah Fernandez (Poland) Magda Linette
Feb 3	Transylvania Open; Cluj-Napoca, Romania; WTA 250; Hard (i) – $275,094 – 32S/16Q/16D; Singles – Doubles	Anastasia Potapova; 4–6, 6–1, 6–2	(Italy) Lucia Bronzetti	Aliaksandra Sasnovich (Czech Republic) Kateřina Siniaková	(Germany) Ella Seidel (Ukraine) Anhelina Kalinina (Italy) Elisabetta Cocciaretto (Bulgaria) Viktoriya Tomova
Feb 3	Transylvania Open; Cluj-Napoca, Romania; WTA 250; Hard (i) – $275,094 – 32S/16Q/16D; Singles – Doubles	(Belgium) Magali Kempen (Czech Republic) Anna Sisková; 6–3, 6–1	(Romania) Jaqueline Cristian (Italy) Angelica Moratelli	Aliaksandra Sasnovich (Czech Republic) Kateřina Siniaková	(Germany) Ella Seidel (Ukraine) Anhelina Kalinina (Italy) Elisabetta Cocciaretto (Bulgaria) Viktoriya Tomova
Feb 10	Qatar Open; Doha, Qatar; WTA 1000; Hard – $3,654,963 – 56S/32Q/28D; Singles – Doubles	(United States) Amanda Anisimova; 6–4, 6–3	(Latvia) Jeļena Ostapenko	Ekaterina Alexandrova (Poland) Iga Świątek	(United States) Jessica Pegula (Ukraine) Marta Kostyuk (Tunisia) Ons Jabeur (Kazakhstan) Elena Rybakina
Feb 10	Qatar Open; Doha, Qatar; WTA 1000; Hard – $3,654,963 – 56S/32Q/28D; Singles – Doubles	(Italy) Sara Errani (Italy) Jasmine Paolini; 7–5, 7–6^{(12–10)}	(China) Jiang Xinyu (Chinese Taipei) Wu Fang-hsien	Ekaterina Alexandrova (Poland) Iga Świątek	(United States) Jessica Pegula (Ukraine) Marta Kostyuk (Tunisia) Ons Jabeur (Kazakhstan) Elena Rybakina
Feb 17	Dubai Tennis Championships; Dubai, UAE; WTA 1000; Hard – $3,654,963 – 56S/32Q/28D; Singles – Doubles	Mirra Andreeva; 7–6^{(7–1)}, 6–1	(Denmark) Clara Tauson	(Czech Republic) Karolína Muchová (Kazakhstan) Elena Rybakina	(Czech Republic) Linda Nosková (Romania) Sorana Cîrstea (United States) Sofia Kenin (Poland) Iga Świątek
Feb 17	Dubai Tennis Championships; Dubai, UAE; WTA 1000; Hard – $3,654,963 – 56S/32Q/28D; Singles – Doubles	(Czech Republic) Kateřina Siniaková (United States) Taylor Townsend; 7–6^{(7–5)}, 6–4	(Chinese Taipei) Hsieh Su-wei (Latvia) Jeļena Ostapenko	(Czech Republic) Karolína Muchová (Kazakhstan) Elena Rybakina	(Czech Republic) Linda Nosková (Romania) Sorana Cîrstea (United States) Sofia Kenin (Poland) Iga Świątek
Feb 24	Mérida Open; Merida, Mexico; WTA 500; Hard – $1,064,510 – 28S/24Q/16D; Singles – Doubles	(United States) Emma Navarro; 6–0, 6–0	(Colombia) Emiliana Arango	(Armenia) Elina Avanesyan (Australia) Daria Saville	(Turkey) Zeynep Sönmez (Australia) Maya Joint (Slovakia) Rebecca Šramková (Spain) Paula Badosa
Feb 24	Mérida Open; Merida, Mexico; WTA 500; Hard – $1,064,510 – 28S/24Q/16D; Singles – Doubles	(Poland) Katarzyna Piter (Egypt) Mayar Sherif; 7–6^{(7–2)}, 7–5	(Kazakhstan) Anna Danilina; Irina Khromacheva	(Armenia) Elina Avanesyan (Australia) Daria Saville	(Turkey) Zeynep Sönmez (Australia) Maya Joint (Slovakia) Rebecca Šramková (Spain) Paula Badosa
Feb 24	ATX Open; Austin, United States; WTA 250; Hard – $275,094 – 32S/16Q/16D; Singles – Doubles	(United States) Jessica Pegula; 7–5, 6–2	(United States) McCartney Kessler	(Australia) Ajla Tomljanović (Belgium) Greet Minnen	Anna Blinkova (Japan) Ena Shibahara (United States) Caroline Dolehide (Romania) Sorana Cîrstea
Feb 24	ATX Open; Austin, United States; WTA 250; Hard – $275,094 – 32S/16Q/16D; Singles – Doubles	Anna Blinkova (China) Yuan Yue; 3–6, 6–1, [10–4]	(United States) McCartney Kessler (China) Zhang Shuai	(Australia) Ajla Tomljanović (Belgium) Greet Minnen	Anna Blinkova (Japan) Ena Shibahara (United States) Caroline Dolehide (Romania) Sorana Cîrstea

=== March ===
Week	Tournament	Champions	Runners-up	Semifinalists	Quarterfinalists
Mar 3 Mar 15	Indian Wells Open; Indian Wells, United States; WTA 1000; Hard – $8,963,700 – 96S/48Q/32D/12X; Singles – Doubles – Mixed	Mirra Andreeva; 2–6, 6–4, 6–3	Aryna Sabalenka	(United States) Madison Keys (Poland) Iga Świątek	Liudmila Samsonova (Switzerland) Belinda Bencic (Ukraine) Elina Svitolina (China) Zheng Qinwen
Mar 3 Mar 15	Indian Wells Open; Indian Wells, United States; WTA 1000; Hard – $8,963,700 – 96S/48Q/32D/12X; Singles – Doubles – Mixed	(United States) Asia Muhammad (Netherlands) Demi Schuurs; 6–2, 7–6^{(7–4)}	(Slovakia) Tereza Mihalíková (United Kingdom) Olivia Nicholls	(United States) Madison Keys (Poland) Iga Świątek	Liudmila Samsonova (Switzerland) Belinda Bencic (Ukraine) Elina Svitolina (China) Zheng Qinwen
Mar 3 Mar 15	Indian Wells Open; Indian Wells, United States; WTA 1000; Hard – $8,963,700 – 96S/48Q/32D/12X; Singles – Doubles – Mixed	(Italy) Sara Errani (Italy) Andrea Vavassori; 6–7^{(3–7)}, 6–3, [10–8]	(United States) Bethanie Mattek-Sands (Croatia) Mate Pavić	(United States) Madison Keys (Poland) Iga Świątek	Liudmila Samsonova (Switzerland) Belinda Bencic (Ukraine) Elina Svitolina (China) Zheng Qinwen
Mar 17; Mar 29	Miami Open; Miami Gardens, United States; WTA 1000; Hard – $8,963,700 – 96S/48Q/32D; Singles – Doubles	Aryna Sabalenka; 7–5, 6–2	(United States) Jessica Pegula	(Italy) Jasmine Paolini (Philippines) Alexandra Eala	(China) Zheng Qinwen (Poland) Magda Linette (United Kingdom) Emma Raducanu (Poland) Iga Świątek
Mar 17; Mar 29	Miami Open; Miami Gardens, United States; WTA 1000; Hard – $8,963,700 – 96S/48Q/32D; Singles – Doubles	Mirra Andreeva; Diana Shnaider; 6–3, 6–7^{(5–7)}, [10–2]	(Spain) Cristina Bucșa (Japan) Miyu Kato	(Italy) Jasmine Paolini (Philippines) Alexandra Eala	(China) Zheng Qinwen (Poland) Magda Linette (United Kingdom) Emma Raducanu (Poland) Iga Świątek
Mar 31	Charleston Open; Charleston, United States; WTA 500; Clay (green) – $1,064,510 – 48S/24Q/16D; Singles – Doubles	(United States) Jessica Pegula; 6–3, 7–5	(United States) Sofia Kenin	Ekaterina Alexandrova (United States) Amanda Anisimova	(United States) Danielle Collins (China) Zheng Qinwen (United States) Emma Navarro; Anna Kalinskaya
Mar 31	Charleston Open; Charleston, United States; WTA 500; Clay (green) – $1,064,510 – 48S/24Q/16D; Singles – Doubles	(Latvia) Jeļena Ostapenko (New Zealand) Erin Routliffe; 6–4, 6–2	(United States) Caroline Dolehide (United States) Desirae Krawczyk	Ekaterina Alexandrova (United States) Amanda Anisimova	(United States) Danielle Collins (China) Zheng Qinwen (United States) Emma Navarro; Anna Kalinskaya
Mar 31	Copa Colsanitas; Bogotá, Colombia; WTA 250; Clay – $275,094 – 32S/16Q/16D; Singles – Doubles	(Colombia) Camila Osorio; 6–3, 6–3	(Poland) Katarzyna Kawa	(United States) Julieta Pareja (Argentina) Julia Riera	(Czech Republic) Marie Bouzková (France) Léolia Jeanjean (Croatia) Lea Bošković (Germany) Tatjana Maria
Mar 31	Copa Colsanitas; Bogotá, Colombia; WTA 250; Clay – $275,094 – 32S/16Q/16D; Singles – Doubles	(Spain) Cristina Bucșa (Spain) Sara Sorribes Tormo; 5–7, 6–2, [10–5]	(Romania) Irina Bara (Brazil) Laura Pigossi	(United States) Julieta Pareja (Argentina) Julia Riera	(Czech Republic) Marie Bouzková (France) Léolia Jeanjean (Croatia) Lea Bošković (Germany) Tatjana Maria

=== April ===
Week	Tournament	Champions	Runners-up	Semifinalists	Quarterfinalists
Apr 7	Billie Jean King Cup qualifying round	Qualifying-round winners Japan; Spain; United States; Kazakhstan; Ukraine; Great Britain	Qualifying-round losers Canada; Romania; Czech Republic; Brazil; Slovakia; Denmark; Australia; Colombia; Poland; Switzerland; Netherlands; Germany		
Apr 14	Stuttgart Open; Stuttgart, Germany; WTA 500; Clay (i) – $925,661 – 28S/16Q/14D; Singles – Doubles	(Latvia) Jeļena Ostapenko; 6–4, 6–1	Aryna Sabalenka	(Italy) Jasmine Paolini; Ekaterina Alexandrova	(Belgium) Elise Mertens (United States) Coco Gauff (United States) Jessica Pegula (Poland) Iga Świątek
Apr 14	Stuttgart Open; Stuttgart, Germany; WTA 500; Clay (i) – $925,661 – 28S/16Q/14D; Singles – Doubles	(Canada) Gabriela Dabrowski (New Zealand) Erin Routliffe; 6–3, 6–3	Ekaterina Alexandrova (China) Zhang Shuai	(Italy) Jasmine Paolini; Ekaterina Alexandrova	(Belgium) Elise Mertens (United States) Coco Gauff (United States) Jessica Pegula (Poland) Iga Świątek
Apr 14	Open de Rouen; Rouen, France; WTA 250; Clay (i) – €239,212 – 32S/24Q/16D; Singles – Doubles	(Ukraine) Elina Svitolina; 6–4, 7–6^{(10–8)}	(Serbia) Olga Danilović	(Romania) Elena-Gabriela Ruse (Netherlands) Suzan Lamens	(Spain) Jéssica Bouzas Maneiro (France) Jessika Ponchet (Japan) Moyuka Uchijima (France) Tiantsoa Rakotomanga Rajaonah
Apr 14	Open de Rouen; Rouen, France; WTA 250; Clay (i) – €239,212 – 32S/24Q/16D; Singles – Doubles	(Serbia) Aleksandra Krunić (United States) Sabrina Santamaria; 6–0, 6–4	Irina Khromacheva (Czech Republic) Linda Nosková	(Romania) Elena-Gabriela Ruse (Netherlands) Suzan Lamens	(Spain) Jéssica Bouzas Maneiro (France) Jessika Ponchet (Japan) Moyuka Uchijima (France) Tiantsoa Rakotomanga Rajaonah
Apr 21; Apr 28	Madrid Open; Madrid, Spain; WTA 1000; Clay – €7,854,000 – 96S/48Q/32D; Singles – Doubles	Aryna Sabalenka; 6–3, 7–6^{(7–3)}	(United States) Coco Gauff	(Ukraine) Elina Svitolina (Poland) Iga Świątek	(Ukraine) Marta Kostyuk (Japan) Moyuka Uchijima; Mirra Andreeva (United States) Madison Keys
Apr 21; Apr 28	Madrid Open; Madrid, Spain; WTA 1000; Clay – €7,854,000 – 96S/48Q/32D; Singles – Doubles	(Romania) Sorana Cîrstea; Anna Kalinskaya; 6–7^{(10–12)}, 6–2, [12–10]	Veronika Kudermetova (Belgium) Elise Mertens	(Ukraine) Elina Svitolina (Poland) Iga Świątek	(Ukraine) Marta Kostyuk (Japan) Moyuka Uchijima; Mirra Andreeva (United States) Madison Keys

=== May ===
Week	Tournament	Champions	Runners-up	Semifinalists	Quarterfinalists
May 5 May 12	Italian Open; Rome, Italy; WTA 1000; Clay – €6,009,593 – 96S/48Q/32D; Singles – Doubles	(Italy) Jasmine Paolini; 6–4, 6–2	(United States) Coco Gauff	(China) Zheng Qinwen (United States) Peyton Stearns	Aryna Sabalenka; Mirra Andreeva; Diana Shnaider (Ukraine) Elina Svitolina
May 5 May 12	Italian Open; Rome, Italy; WTA 1000; Clay – €6,009,593 – 96S/48Q/32D; Singles – Doubles	(Italy) Sara Errani (Italy) Jasmine Paolini; 6–4, 7–5	Veronika Kudermetova (Belgium) Elise Mertens	(China) Zheng Qinwen (United States) Peyton Stearns	Aryna Sabalenka; Mirra Andreeva; Diana Shnaider (Ukraine) Elina Svitolina
May 19	Internationaux de Strasbourg; Strasbourg, France; WTA 500; Clay – €925,661 – 28S/16Q/16D; Singles – Doubles	(Kazakhstan) Elena Rybakina; 6–1, 6–7^{(2–7)}, 6–1	Liudmila Samsonova	(United States) Danielle Collins (Brazil) Beatriz Haddad Maia	Anna Kalinskaya (Spain) Paula Badosa (Poland) Magda Linette (United States) Emma Navarro
May 19	Internationaux de Strasbourg; Strasbourg, France; WTA 500; Clay – €925,661 – 28S/16Q/16D; Singles – Doubles	(Hungary) Tímea Babos (Brazil) Luisa Stefani; 6–3, 6–7^{(3–7)}, [10–7]	(China) Guo Hanyu (United States) Nicole Melichar-Martinez	(United States) Danielle Collins (Brazil) Beatriz Haddad Maia	Anna Kalinskaya (Spain) Paula Badosa (Poland) Magda Linette (United States) Emma Navarro
May 19	Morocco Open; Rabat, Morocco; WTA 250; Clay – $275,094 – 32S/16Q/16D; Singles – Doubles	(Australia) Maya Joint; 6–3, 6–2	(Romania) Jaqueline Cristian	(Australia) Ajla Tomljanović (Colombia) Camila Osorio	(Spain) Jéssica Bouzas Maneiro (United States) Ann Li (Latvia) Anastasija Sevastova (United States) Maria Mateas
May 19	Morocco Open; Rabat, Morocco; WTA 250; Clay – $275,094 – 32S/16Q/16D; Singles – Doubles	(Australia) Maya Joint (Georgia (country)) Oksana Kalashnikova; 6–3, 7–5	(Italy) Angelica Moratelli (Italy) Camilla Rosatello	(Australia) Ajla Tomljanović (Colombia) Camila Osorio	(Spain) Jéssica Bouzas Maneiro (United States) Ann Li (Latvia) Anastasija Sevastova (United States) Maria Mateas
May 26; Jun 8	French Open; Paris, France; Grand Slam; Clay – €26,334,000 – 128S/64D/32X; Singles – Doubles – Mixed	(United States) Coco Gauff; 6–7^{(5–7)}, 6–2, 6–4	Aryna Sabalenka	(Poland) Iga Świątek (France) Loïs Boisson	(China) Zheng Qinwen (Ukraine) Elina Svitolina; Mirra Andreeva (United States) Madison Keys
May 26; Jun 8	French Open; Paris, France; Grand Slam; Clay – €26,334,000 – 128S/64D/32X; Singles – Doubles – Mixed	(Italy) Sara Errani (Italy) Jasmine Paolini; 6–4, 2–6, 6–1	(Kazakhstan) Anna Danilina (Serbia) Aleksandra Krunić	(Poland) Iga Świątek (France) Loïs Boisson	(China) Zheng Qinwen (Ukraine) Elina Svitolina; Mirra Andreeva (United States) Madison Keys
May 26; Jun 8	French Open; Paris, France; Grand Slam; Clay – €26,334,000 – 128S/64D/32X; Singles – Doubles – Mixed	(Italy) Sara Errani (Italy) Andrea Vavassori; 6–4, 6–2	(United States) Taylor Townsend (United States) Evan King	(Poland) Iga Świątek (France) Loïs Boisson	(China) Zheng Qinwen (Ukraine) Elina Svitolina; Mirra Andreeva (United States) Madison Keys

=== June ===
Week	Tournament	Champions	Runners-up	Semifinalists	Quarterfinalists
Jun 9	Queen's Club Championships; London, United Kingdom; WTA 500; Grass – $1,415,000 – 28S/24Q/16D; Singles – Doubles	(Germany) Tatjana Maria; 6–3, 6–4	(United States) Amanda Anisimova	(China) Zheng Qinwen (United States) Madison Keys	(United Kingdom) Emma Raducanu (United States) Emma Navarro (Kazakhstan) Elena Rybakina; Diana Shnaider
Jun 9	Queen's Club Championships; London, United Kingdom; WTA 500; Grass – $1,415,000 – 28S/24Q/16D; Singles – Doubles	(United States) Asia Muhammad (Netherlands) Demi Schuurs; 7–5, 6–7^{(3–7)}, [10–4]	(Kazakhstan) Anna Danilina; Diana Shnaider	(China) Zheng Qinwen (United States) Madison Keys	(United Kingdom) Emma Raducanu (United States) Emma Navarro (Kazakhstan) Elena Rybakina; Diana Shnaider
Jun 9	Libéma Open; Rosmalen, Netherlands; WTA 250; Grass – €239,212 – 32S/24Q/16D; Singles – Doubles	(Belgium) Elise Mertens; 6–3, 7–6^{(7–4)}	(Romania) Elena-Gabriela Ruse	(Italy) Elisabetta Cocciaretto; Ekaterina Alexandrova	(Canada) Bianca Andreescu (Netherlands) Suzan Lamens (China) Yuan Yue; Veronika Kudermetova
Jun 9	Libéma Open; Rosmalen, Netherlands; WTA 250; Grass – €239,212 – 32S/24Q/16D; Singles – Doubles	Irina Khromacheva (Hungary) Fanny Stollár; 7–5, 6–3	(United States) Nicole Melichar-Martinez; Liudmila Samsonova	(Italy) Elisabetta Cocciaretto; Ekaterina Alexandrova	(Canada) Bianca Andreescu (Netherlands) Suzan Lamens (China) Yuan Yue; Veronika Kudermetova
Jun 16	German Open; Berlin, Germany; WTA 500; Grass – €925,661 – 28S/24Q/16D; Singles – Doubles	(Czech Republic) Markéta Vondroušová; 7–6^{(12–10)}, 4–6, 6–2	(China) Wang Xinyu	Aryna Sabalenka; Liudmila Samsonova	(Kazakhstan) Elena Rybakina (Tunisia) Ons Jabeur (United States) Amanda Anisimova (Spain) Paula Badosa
Jun 16	German Open; Berlin, Germany; WTA 500; Grass – €925,661 – 28S/24Q/16D; Singles – Doubles	(Slovakia) Tereza Mihalíková (United Kingdom) Olivia Nicholls; 4−6, 6−2, [10−6]	(Italy) Sara Errani (Italy) Jasmine Paolini	Aryna Sabalenka; Liudmila Samsonova	(Kazakhstan) Elena Rybakina (Tunisia) Ons Jabeur (United States) Amanda Anisimova (Spain) Paula Badosa
Jun 16	Nottingham Open; Nottingham, United Kingdom; WTA 250; Grass – $275,094 – 32S/24Q/16D; Singles – Doubles	(United States) McCartney Kessler; 6–4, 7–5	(Ukraine) Dayana Yastremska	(Slovakia) Rebecca Šramková (Poland) Magda Linette	(United Kingdom) Katie Boulter (Czech Republic) Linda Nosková (Canada) Leylah Fernandez (Denmark) Clara Tauson
Jun 16	Nottingham Open; Nottingham, United Kingdom; WTA 250; Grass – $275,094 – 32S/24Q/16D; Singles – Doubles	(Brazil) Beatriz Haddad Maia (Germany) Laura Siegemund; 6–3, 6–2	(Kazakhstan) Anna Danilina (Japan) Ena Shibahara	(Slovakia) Rebecca Šramková (Poland) Magda Linette	(United Kingdom) Katie Boulter (Czech Republic) Linda Nosková (Canada) Leylah Fernandez (Denmark) Clara Tauson
Jun 23	Bad Homburg Open; Bad Homburg, Germany; WTA 500; Grass – $1,064,510 – 32S/16Q/16D; Singles – Doubles	(United States) Jessica Pegula; 6–4, 7–5	(Poland) Iga Świątek	(Czech Republic) Linda Nosková (Italy) Jasmine Paolini	(United States) Emma Navarro; Mirra Andreeva; Ekaterina Alexandrova (Brazil) Beatriz Haddad Maia
Jun 23	Bad Homburg Open; Bad Homburg, Germany; WTA 500; Grass – $1,064,510 – 32S/16Q/16D; Singles – Doubles	(China) Guo Hanyu; Alexandra Panova; 4–6, 7–6^{(7–4)}, [10–5]	(Ukraine) Lyudmyla Kichenok (Australia) Ellen Perez	(Czech Republic) Linda Nosková (Italy) Jasmine Paolini	(United States) Emma Navarro; Mirra Andreeva; Ekaterina Alexandrova (Brazil) Beatriz Haddad Maia
Jun 23	Eastbourne Open; Eastbourne, United Kingdom; WTA 250; Grass – $389,000 – 32S/24Q/16D; Singles – Doubles	(Australia) Maya Joint; 6–4, 1–6, 7–6^{(12–10)}	(Philippines) Alexandra Eala	Anastasia Pavlyuchenkova (France) Varvara Gracheva	Anna Blinkova; Kamilla Rakhimova (Ukraine) Dayana Yastremska (Czech Republic) Barbora Krejčíková
Jun 23	Eastbourne Open; Eastbourne, United Kingdom; WTA 250; Grass – $389,000 – 32S/24Q/16D; Singles – Doubles	(Czech Republic) Marie Bouzková (Kazakhstan) Anna Danilina; 6–4, 7–5	(Chinese Taipei) Hsieh Su-wei (Australia) Maya Joint	Anastasia Pavlyuchenkova (France) Varvara Gracheva	Anna Blinkova; Kamilla Rakhimova (Ukraine) Dayana Yastremska (Czech Republic) Barbora Krejčíková
Jun 30; Jul 7	Wimbledon; London, United Kingdom; Grand Slam; Grass – $25,161,500 – 128S/64D/32X; Singles – Doubles – Mixed	(Poland) Iga Świątek; 6–0, 6–0	(United States) Amanda Anisimova	Aryna Sabalenka (Switzerland) Belinda Bencic	(Germany) Laura Siegemund; Anastasia Pavlyuchenkova; Mirra Andreeva; Liudmila Samsonova
Jun 30; Jul 7	Wimbledon; London, United Kingdom; Grand Slam; Grass – $25,161,500 – 128S/64D/32X; Singles – Doubles – Mixed	Veronika Kudermetova (Belgium) Elise Mertens; 3–6, 6–2, 6–4	(Chinese Taipei) Hsieh Su-wei (Latvia) Jeļena Ostapenko	Aryna Sabalenka (Switzerland) Belinda Bencic	(Germany) Laura Siegemund; Anastasia Pavlyuchenkova; Mirra Andreeva; Liudmila Samsonova
Jun 30; Jul 7	Wimbledon; London, United Kingdom; Grand Slam; Grass – $25,161,500 – 128S/64D/32X; Singles – Doubles – Mixed	(Czech Republic) Kateřina Siniaková (Netherlands) Sem Verbeek; 7–6^{(7–3)}, 7–6^{(7–3)}	(Brazil) Luisa Stefani (United Kingdom) Joe Salisbury	Aryna Sabalenka (Switzerland) Belinda Bencic	(Germany) Laura Siegemund; Anastasia Pavlyuchenkova; Mirra Andreeva; Liudmila Samsonova

=== July ===
Week	Tournament	Champions	Runners-up	Semifinalists	Quarterfinalists
Jul 14	Hopman Cup; Bari, Italy; ITF Mixed Teams Championships; Hard – 6 teams (RR)	Canada; 2–1	Italy	Round robin (Group A); Greece; Spain	Round robin (Group B); Croatia; France
Jul 14	Iași Open; Iași, Romania; WTA 250; Clay – €239,212 – 32S/24Q/16D; Singles – Doubles	(Romania) Irina-Camelia Begu; 6–0, 7–5	(Switzerland) Jil Teichmann	(Romania) Sorana Cîrstea (Romania) Jaqueline Cristian	(Argentina) María Lourdes Carlé (Switzerland) Simona Waltert (Czech Republic) Anna Sisková (Hungary) Panna Udvardy
Jul 14	Iași Open; Iași, Romania; WTA 250; Clay – €239,212 – 32S/24Q/16D; Singles – Doubles	(Slovenia) Veronika Erjavec (Hungary) Panna Udvardy; 7–5, 6–3	(Argentina) María Lourdes Carlé (Switzerland) Simona Waltert	(Romania) Sorana Cîrstea (Romania) Jaqueline Cristian	(Argentina) María Lourdes Carlé (Switzerland) Simona Waltert (Czech Republic) Anna Sisková (Hungary) Panna Udvardy
Jul 14	Hamburg Open; Hamburg, Germany; WTA 250; Clay – €275,094 – 32S/24Q/16D; Singles – Doubles	(France) Loïs Boisson; 7–5, 6–3	(Hungary) Anna Bondár	(Slovenia) Kaja Juvan (Ukraine) Dayana Yastremska	Ekaterina Alexandrova (Spain) Leyre Romero Gormaz (Bulgaria) Viktoriya Tomova (Hungary) Dalma Gálfi
Jul 14	Hamburg Open; Hamburg, Germany; WTA 250; Clay – €275,094 – 32S/24Q/16D; Singles – Doubles	(Ukraine) Nadiia Kichenok (Japan) Makoto Ninomiya; 6–4, 3–6, [11–9]	(Hungary) Anna Bondár (Netherlands) Arantxa Rus	(Slovenia) Kaja Juvan (Ukraine) Dayana Yastremska	Ekaterina Alexandrova (Spain) Leyre Romero Gormaz (Bulgaria) Viktoriya Tomova (Hungary) Dalma Gálfi
Jul 21	Washington Open; Washington DC, United States; WTA 500; Hard – $1,282,951 – 28S/24Q/16D; Singles – Doubles	(Canada) Leylah Fernandez; 6–1, 6–2	Anna Kalinskaya	(Kazakhstan) Elena Rybakina (United Kingdom) Emma Raducanu	(United States) Taylor Townsend (Poland) Magdalena Fręch (Denmark) Clara Tauson (Greece) Maria Sakkari
Jul 21	Washington Open; Washington DC, United States; WTA 500; Hard – $1,282,951 – 28S/24Q/16D; Singles – Doubles	(United States) Taylor Townsend (China) Zhang Shuai; 6–1, 6–1	(United States) Caroline Dolehide (United States) Sofia Kenin	(Kazakhstan) Elena Rybakina (United Kingdom) Emma Raducanu	(United States) Taylor Townsend (Poland) Magdalena Fręch (Denmark) Clara Tauson (Greece) Maria Sakkari
Jul 21	Prague Open; Prague, Czech Republic; WTA 250; Hard – $275,094 – 32S/24Q/16D; Singles – Doubles	(Czech Republic) Marie Bouzková; 2–6, 6–1, 6–3	(Czech Republic) Linda Nosková	(China) Wang Xinyu (Czech Republic) Tereza Valentová	(Czech Republic) Kateřina Siniaková (Czech Republic) Sára Bejlek (United States) Ann Li (France) Jessika Ponchet
Jul 21	Prague Open; Prague, Czech Republic; WTA 250; Hard – $275,094 – 32S/24Q/16D; Singles – Doubles	(Ukraine) Nadiia Kichenok (Japan) Makoto Ninomiya; 1–6, 6–4, [10–7]	(Czech Republic) Lucie Havlíčková (Czech Republic) Laura Samson	(China) Wang Xinyu (Czech Republic) Tereza Valentová	(Czech Republic) Kateřina Siniaková (Czech Republic) Sára Bejlek (United States) Ann Li (France) Jessika Ponchet
Jul 28; Aug 4	Canadian Open; Montreal, Canada; WTA 1000; Hard – $5,152,599 – 96S/32Q/32D; Singles – Doubles	(Canada) Victoria Mboko; 2–6, 6–4, 6–1	(Japan) Naomi Osaka	(Kazakhstan) Elena Rybakina (Denmark) Clara Tauson	(Spain) Jéssica Bouzas Maneiro (Ukraine) Marta Kostyuk (Ukraine) Elina Svitolina (United States) Madison Keys
Jul 28; Aug 4	Canadian Open; Montreal, Canada; WTA 1000; Hard – $5,152,599 – 96S/32Q/32D; Singles – Doubles	(United States) Coco Gauff (United States) McCartney Kessler; 6–4, 1–6, [13–11]	(United States) Taylor Townsend (China) Zhang Shuai	(Kazakhstan) Elena Rybakina (Denmark) Clara Tauson	(Spain) Jéssica Bouzas Maneiro (Ukraine) Marta Kostyuk (Ukraine) Elina Svitolina (United States) Madison Keys

=== August ===
Week	Tournament	Champions	Runners-up	Semifinalists	Quarterfinalists
Aug 4 Aug 11	Cincinnati Open; Mason, United States; WTA 1000; Hard – $5,152,599 – 96S/48Q/32D; Singles – Doubles	(Poland) Iga Świątek; 7–5, 6–4	(Italy) Jasmine Paolini	(Kazakhstan) Elena Rybakina; Veronika Kudermetova	Aryna Sabalenka; Anna Kalinskaya (France) Varvara Gracheva (United States) Coco Gauff
Aug 4 Aug 11	Cincinnati Open; Mason, United States; WTA 1000; Hard – $5,152,599 – 96S/48Q/32D; Singles – Doubles	(Canada) Gabriela Dabrowski (New Zealand) Erin Routliffe; 6–4, 6–3	(China) Guo Hanyu; Alexandra Panova	(Kazakhstan) Elena Rybakina; Veronika Kudermetova	Aryna Sabalenka; Anna Kalinskaya (France) Varvara Gracheva (United States) Coco Gauff
Aug 18	Monterrey Open; Monterrey, Mexico; WTA 500; Hard – $1,064,510 – 28S/16Q/16D; Singles – Doubles	Diana Shnaider; 6–3, 4–6, 6–4	Ekaterina Alexandrova	(United States) Alycia Parks (Czech Republic) Marie Bouzková	(Slovakia) Rebecca Šramková (Belgium) Elise Mertens (Croatia) Antonia Ružić (Czech Republic) Linda Nosková
Aug 18	Monterrey Open; Monterrey, Mexico; WTA 500; Hard – $1,064,510 – 28S/16Q/16D; Singles – Doubles	(Spain) Cristina Bucșa (United States) Nicole Melichar-Martinez; 6–2, 6–0	(China) Guo Hanyu; Alexandra Panova	(United States) Alycia Parks (Czech Republic) Marie Bouzková	(Slovakia) Rebecca Šramková (Belgium) Elise Mertens (Croatia) Antonia Ružić (Czech Republic) Linda Nosková
Aug 18	Tennis in the Land; Cleveland, United States; WTA 250; Hard – $275,094 – 32S/16Q/16D; Singles – Doubles	(Romania) Sorana Cîrstea; 6–2, 6–4	(United States) Ann Li	Anastasia Zakharova (China) Wang Xinyu	Liudmila Samsonova (Germany) Eva Lys (France) Elsa Jacquemot (Switzerland) Viktorija Golubic
Aug 18	Tennis in the Land; Cleveland, United States; WTA 250; Hard – $275,094 – 32S/16Q/16D; Singles – Doubles	(Kazakhstan) Anna Danilina (Serbia) Aleksandra Krunić; 7–6^{(7–3)}, 6–4	(Chinese Taipei) Chan Hao-ching (China) Jiang Xinyu	Anastasia Zakharova (China) Wang Xinyu	Liudmila Samsonova (Germany) Eva Lys (France) Elsa Jacquemot (Switzerland) Viktorija Golubic
Aug 25; Sept 1	US Open; New York, United States; Grand Slam; Hard – $41,592,800 – 128S/64D/16X; Singles – Doubles – Mixed (Note: Mixed doubles competition took place on the week of August 18)	Aryna Sabalenka; 6–3, 7–6^{(7–3)}	(United States) Amanda Anisimova	(United States) Jessica Pegula (Japan) Naomi Osaka	(Czech Republic) Markéta Vondroušová (Czech Republic) Barbora Krejčíková (Czech Republic) Karolína Muchová (Poland) Iga Świątek
Aug 25; Sept 1	US Open; New York, United States; Grand Slam; Hard – $41,592,800 – 128S/64D/16X; Singles – Doubles – Mixed	(Canada) Gabriela Dabrowski (New Zealand) Erin Routliffe; 6–4, 6–4	(Czech Republic) Kateřina Siniaková (United States) Taylor Townsend	(United States) Jessica Pegula (Japan) Naomi Osaka	(Czech Republic) Markéta Vondroušová (Czech Republic) Barbora Krejčíková (Czech Republic) Karolína Muchová (Poland) Iga Świątek
Aug 25; Sept 1	US Open; New York, United States; Grand Slam; Hard – $41,592,800 – 128S/64D/16X; Singles – Doubles – Mixed	(Italy) Sara Errani (Italy) Andrea Vavassori; 6–3, 5–7, [10–6]	(Poland) Iga Świątek (Norway) Casper Ruud	(United States) Jessica Pegula (Japan) Naomi Osaka	(Czech Republic) Markéta Vondroušová (Czech Republic) Barbora Krejčíková (Czech Republic) Karolína Muchová (Poland) Iga Świątek

=== September ===
Week	Tournament	Champions	Runners-up	Semifinalists	Quarterfinalists
Sep 8	Guadalajara Open; Guadalajara, Mexico; WTA 500; Hard – $1,064,510 – 28S/24Q/16D; Singles – Doubles	(United States) Iva Jovic; 6–4, 6–1	(Colombia) Emiliana Arango	(France) Elsa Jacquemot (Czech Republic) Nikola Bartůňková	(Germany) Tatjana Maria (Canada) Marina Stakusic (Poland) Magdalena Fręch (Andorra) Victoria Jiménez Kasintseva
Sep 8	Guadalajara Open; Guadalajara, Mexico; WTA 500; Hard – $1,064,510 – 28S/24Q/16D; Singles – Doubles	Irina Khromacheva (United States) Nicole Melichar-Martinez; 6–3, 6–4	(Mexico) Giuliana Olmos (Indonesia) Aldila Sutjiadi	(France) Elsa Jacquemot (Czech Republic) Nikola Bartůňková	(Germany) Tatjana Maria (Canada) Marina Stakusic (Poland) Magdalena Fręch (Andorra) Victoria Jiménez Kasintseva
Sep 8	SP Open; São Paulo, Brazil; WTA 250; Hard– $275,094 – 32S/24Q/16D; Singles – Doubles	(France) Tiantsoa Rakotomanga Rajaonah; 6–3, 6–4	(Indonesia) Janice Tjen	(Mexico) Renata Zarazúa (United Kingdom) Francesca Jones	(Brazil) Beatriz Haddad Maia (Hungary) Panna Udvardy (Philippines) Alexandra Eala (Argentina) Solana Sierra
Sep 8	SP Open; São Paulo, Brazil; WTA 250; Hard– $275,094 – 32S/24Q/16D; Singles – Doubles	(Hungary) Tímea Babos (Brazil) Luisa Stefani; 4–6, 6–3, [10–4]	(Brazil) Ingrid Martins (Brazil) Laura Pigossi	(Mexico) Renata Zarazúa (United Kingdom) Francesca Jones	(Brazil) Beatriz Haddad Maia (Hungary) Panna Udvardy (Philippines) Alexandra Eala (Argentina) Solana Sierra
Sep 15	Billie Jean King Cup Finals; Shenzhen, China; Hard (i) – 8 teams	Italy; 2–0	United States	Ukraine; Great Britain	China; Spain; Kazakhstan; Japan
Sep 15	Korea Open; Seoul, South Korea; WTA 500; Hard – $1,064,510 – 28S/24Q/16D; Singles – Doubles	(Poland) Iga Świątek; 1–6, 7–6^{(7–3)}, 7–5	Ekaterina Alexandrova	(Australia) Maya Joint (Czech Republic) Kateřina Siniaková	(Czech Republic) Barbora Krejčíková (Denmark) Clara Tauson (Netherlands) Suzan Lamens (Germany) Ella Seidel
Sep 15	Korea Open; Seoul, South Korea; WTA 500; Hard – $1,064,510 – 28S/24Q/16D; Singles – Doubles	(Czech Republic) Barbora Krejčíková (Czech Republic) Kateřina Siniaková; 6–3, 7–6^{(8–6)}	(Australia) Maya Joint (United States) Caty McNally	(Australia) Maya Joint (Czech Republic) Kateřina Siniaková	(Czech Republic) Barbora Krejčíková (Denmark) Clara Tauson (Netherlands) Suzan Lamens (Germany) Ella Seidel
Sep 22; Sep 29	China Open; Beijing, China; WTA 1000; Hard – $8,963,700 – 96S/48Q/32D; Singles – Doubles	(United States) Amanda Anisimova; 6–0, 2–6, 6–2	(Czech Republic) Linda Nosková	(United States) Jessica Pegula (United States) Coco Gauff	(United States) Emma Navarro (United Kingdom) Sonay Kartal (Italy) Jasmine Paolini (Germany) Eva Lys
Sep 22; Sep 29	China Open; Beijing, China; WTA 1000; Hard – $8,963,700 – 96S/48Q/32D; Singles – Doubles	(Italy) Sara Errani (Italy) Jasmine Paolini; 6–7^{(1–7)}, 6–3, [10–2]	(Japan) Miyu Kato (Hungary) Fanny Stollár	(United States) Jessica Pegula (United States) Coco Gauff	(United States) Emma Navarro (United Kingdom) Sonay Kartal (Italy) Jasmine Paolini (Germany) Eva Lys

=== October ===
Week	Tournament	Champions	Runners-up	Semifinalists	Quarterfinalists
Oct 6	Wuhan Open; Wuhan, China; WTA 1000; Hard – $3,654,963 – 56S/24Q/28D; Singles – Doubles	(United States) Coco Gauff; 6–4, 7–5	(United States) Jessica Pegula	Aryna Sabalenka (Italy) Jasmine Paolini	(Kazakhstan) Elena Rybakina (Czech Republic) Kateřina Siniaková (Germany) Laura Siegemund (Poland) Iga Świątek
Oct 6	Wuhan Open; Wuhan, China; WTA 1000; Hard – $3,654,963 – 56S/24Q/28D; Singles – Doubles	(Australia) Storm Hunter (Czech Republic) Kateřina Siniaková; 6–3, 6–2	(Kazakhstan) Anna Danilina (Serbia) Aleksandra Krunić	Aryna Sabalenka (Italy) Jasmine Paolini	(Kazakhstan) Elena Rybakina (Czech Republic) Kateřina Siniaková (Germany) Laura Siegemund (Poland) Iga Świątek
Oct 13	Ningbo Open; Ningbo, China; WTA 500; Hard – $1,064,510 – 28S/24Q/16D; Singles – Doubles	(Kazakhstan) Elena Rybakina; 3–6, 6–0, 6–2	Ekaterina Alexandrova	Diana Shnaider (Italy) Jasmine Paolini	(China) Zhu Lin (United States) McCartney Kessler (Australia) Ajla Tomljanović (Switzerland) Belinda Bencic
Oct 13	Ningbo Open; Ningbo, China; WTA 500; Hard – $1,064,510 – 28S/24Q/16D; Singles – Doubles	(United States) Nicole Melichar-Martinez; Liudmila Samsonova; 5–7, 6–4, [10–8]	(Hungary) Tímea Babos (Brazil) Luisa Stefani	Diana Shnaider (Italy) Jasmine Paolini	(China) Zhu Lin (United States) McCartney Kessler (Australia) Ajla Tomljanović (Switzerland) Belinda Bencic
Oct 13	Japan Open; Osaka, Japan; WTA 250; Hard – $275,094 – 32S/24Q/16D; Singles – Doubles	(Canada) Leylah Fernandez; 6–0, 5–7, 6–3	(Czech Republic) Tereza Valentová	(Romania) Jaqueline Cristian (Romania) Sorana Cîrstea	(Japan) Naomi Osaka (Serbia) Olga Danilović (Slovakia) Rebecca Šramková (Switzerland) Viktorija Golubic
Oct 13	Japan Open; Osaka, Japan; WTA 250; Hard – $275,094 – 32S/24Q/16D; Singles – Doubles	(France) Kristina Mladenovic (United States) Taylor Townsend; 6–4, 2–6, [10–5]	(Australia) Storm Hunter (United States) Desirae Krawczyk	(Romania) Jaqueline Cristian (Romania) Sorana Cîrstea	(Japan) Naomi Osaka (Serbia) Olga Danilović (Slovakia) Rebecca Šramková (Switzerland) Viktorija Golubic
Oct 20	Pan Pacific Open; Tokyo, Japan; WTA 500; Hard – $1,064,510 – 28S/24Q/16D; Singles – Doubles	(Switzerland) Belinda Bencic; 6–2, 6–3	(Czech Republic) Linda Nosková	(United States) Sofia Kenin (Kazakhstan) Elena Rybakina	(Czech Republic) Karolína Muchová; Ekaterina Alexandrova; Anna Kalinskaya (Canada) Victoria Mboko
Oct 20	Pan Pacific Open; Tokyo, Japan; WTA 500; Hard – $1,064,510 – 28S/24Q/16D; Singles – Doubles	(Hungary) Tímea Babos (Brazil) Luisa Stefani; 6–1, 6–4	(Kazakhstan) Anna Danilina (Serbia) Aleksandra Krunić	(United States) Sofia Kenin (Kazakhstan) Elena Rybakina	(Czech Republic) Karolína Muchová; Ekaterina Alexandrova; Anna Kalinskaya (Canada) Victoria Mboko
Oct 20	Guangzhou Open; Guangzhou, China; WTA 250; Hard – $275,094 – 32S/24Q/16D; Singles – Doubles	(United States) Ann Li; 7–6^{(8–6)}, 6–2	(New Zealand) Lulu Sun	(United States) Claire Liu (China) Zhang Shuai	(United States) Caty McNally (Germany) Ella Seidel (United States) Katie Volynets (Italy) Elisabetta Cocciaretto
Oct 20	Guangzhou Open; Guangzhou, China; WTA 250; Hard – $275,094 – 32S/24Q/16D; Singles – Doubles	(Poland) Katarzyna Piter (Indonesia) Janice Tjen; 3–6, 6–3, [10–5]	(Hong Kong) Eudice Chong (Chinese Taipei) Liang En-shuo	(United States) Claire Liu (China) Zhang Shuai	(United States) Caty McNally (Germany) Ella Seidel (United States) Katie Volynets (Italy) Elisabetta Cocciaretto
Oct 27	Hong Kong Open; Hong Kong, China; WTA 250; Hard – $275,094 – 32S/24Q/16D; Singles – Doubles	(Canada) Victoria Mboko; 7–5, 6–7^{(9–11)}, 6–2	(Spain) Cristina Bucșa	(Australia) Maya Joint (Canada) Leylah Fernandez	(Switzerland) Belinda Bencic (Japan) Himeno Sakatsume; Anna Kalinskaya (Romania) Sorana Cîrstea
Oct 27	Hong Kong Open; Hong Kong, China; WTA 250; Hard – $275,094 – 32S/24Q/16D; Singles – Doubles	(China) Jiang Xinyu (China) Wang Yafan; 6–4, 6–2	(Japan) Momoko Kobori (Thailand) Peangtarn Plipuech	(Australia) Maya Joint (Canada) Leylah Fernandez	(Switzerland) Belinda Bencic (Japan) Himeno Sakatsume; Anna Kalinskaya (Romania) Sorana Cîrstea
Oct 27	Jiangxi Open; Jiujiang, China; WTA 250; Hard – $275,094 – 32S/16Q/16D; Singles – Doubles	Anna Blinkova; 6–3, 6–3	(Austria) Lilli Tagger	(Czech Republic) Dominika Šalková (Switzerland) Viktorija Golubic	(China) Bai Zhuoxuan (United States) Alycia Parks (Germany) Tamara Korpatsch (Kazakhstan) Yulia Putintseva
Oct 27	Jiangxi Open; Jiujiang, China; WTA 250; Hard – $275,094 – 32S/16Q/16D; Singles – Doubles	(United States) Quinn Gleason; Elena Pridankina; 6–4, 2–6, [10–6]	Ekaterina Ovcharenko (United Kingdom) Emily Webley-Smith	(Czech Republic) Dominika Šalková (Switzerland) Viktorija Golubic	(China) Bai Zhuoxuan (United States) Alycia Parks (Germany) Tamara Korpatsch (Kazakhstan) Yulia Putintseva
Oct 27	Chennai Open; Chennai, India; WTA 250; Hard – $275,094 – 32S/16Q/16D; Singles – Doubles	(Indonesia) Janice Tjen; 6–4, 6–3	(Australia) Kimberly Birrell	(Thailand) Lanlana Tararudee (Chinese Taipei) Joanna Garland	Polina Iatcenko (Slovakia) Mia Pohánková (Croatia) Donna Vekić (Australia) Arina Rodionova
Oct 27	Chennai Open; Chennai, India; WTA 250; Hard – $275,094 – 32S/16Q/16D; Singles – Doubles	(Indonesia) Aldila Sutjiadi (Indonesia) Janice Tjen; 7–5, 6–4	(Australia) Storm Hunter (Romania) Monica Niculescu	(Thailand) Lanlana Tararudee (Chinese Taipei) Joanna Garland	Polina Iatcenko (Slovakia) Mia Pohánková (Croatia) Donna Vekić (Australia) Arina Rodionova

=== November ===
Week	Tournament	Champions	Runners-up	Semifinalists	Quarterfinalists
Nov 3	WTA Finals; Riyadh, Saudi Arabia; Year-end championships Hard (i) – $15,500,000 – 8S/8D; Singles – Doubles	(Kazakhstan) Elena Rybakina; 6–3, 7–6^{(7–0)}	Aryna Sabalenka	(United States) Amanda Anisimova (United States) Jessica Pegula	Round robin (United States) Coco Gauff (Italy) Jasmine Paolini (Poland) Iga Świątek; Ekaterina Alexandrova (United States) Madison Keys
Nov 3	WTA Finals; Riyadh, Saudi Arabia; Year-end championships Hard (i) – $15,500,000 – 8S/8D; Singles – Doubles	Veronika Kudermetova (Belgium) Elise Mertens; 7–6^{(7–4)}, 6–1	(Hungary) Tímea Babos (Brazil) Luisa Stefani	(United States) Amanda Anisimova (United States) Jessica Pegula	Round robin (United States) Coco Gauff (Italy) Jasmine Paolini (Poland) Iga Świątek; Ekaterina Alexandrova (United States) Madison Keys

== Statistical information ==
These tables present the number of singles (S), doubles (D), and mixed doubles (X) titles won by each player and each nation during the season, within all the tournament categories of the 2025 WTA Tour: the Grand Slam tournaments, the year-end championships (the WTA Finals), the WTA Premier tournaments (WTA 1000 and WTA 500), and the WTA 250. The players/nations are sorted by:

1. total number of titles (a doubles title won by two players representing the same nation counts as only one win for the nation);
2. cumulated point value of those titles (one Grand Slam tournament win equaling two WTA 1000 wins, one year-end championships win equaling one-and-a-half WTA 1000 win, one WTA 1000 win equaling two WTA 500 wins, one WTA 500 win equaling two WTA 250 wins);
3. a singles > doubles > mixed doubles hierarchy;
4. alphabetical order (by family names for players).

=== Key ===
Grand Slam
WTA Finals
WTA 1000
WTA 500
WTA 250

=== Titles won by player ===
Total	Player	Grand Slam			Year-end		WTA 1000			WTA 500		WTA 250		Total		
Total	Player	S	D	X	S	D	S	D	X	S	D	S	D	S	D	X
7	Sara Errani (ITA)		●	● ●				● ● ●	●					0	4	3
5	Kateřina Siniaková (CZE)		●	●				● ●			●			0	4	1
5	Jasmine Paolini (ITA)		●				●	● ● ●						1	4	0
4	Aryna Sabalenka (Note: As of 1 March 2022, the WTA announced that players from Russia and Belarus will not compete in tournaments under the name or flag of Russia or Belarus due to the Russian invasion of Ukraine.)	●					● ●			●				4	0	0
4	Elise Mertens (BEL)		●			●						● ●		2	2	0
4	Erin Routliffe (NZL)		●					●			● ●			0	4	0
4	Taylor Townsend (USA)		●					●			●		●	0	4	0
4	Mirra Andreeva						● ●	●			●			2	2	0
4	Tímea Babos (HUN)										● ● ●		●	0	4	0
4	Luisa Stefani (BRA)										● ● ●		●	0	4	0
3	Coco Gauff (USA)	●					●	●						2	1	0
3	Iga Świątek (POL)	●					●			●				3	0	0
3	Gabriela Dabrowski (CAN)		●					●			●			0	3	0
3	Elena Rybakina (KAZ)				●					● ●				3	0	0
3	Diana Shnaider							●		●	●			1	2	0
3	McCartney Kessler (USA)							●				● ●		2	1	0
3	Jeļena Ostapenko (LAT)									●	● ●			1	2	0
3	Nicole Melichar-Martinez (USA)										● ● ●			0	3	0
3	Jessica Pegula (USA)									● ●		●		3	0	0
3	Maya Joint (AUS)											● ●	●	2	1	0
3	Janice Tjen (INA)											●	● ●	1	2	0
3	Jiang Xinyu (CHN)												● ● ●	0	3	0
2	Veronika Kudermetova		●			●								0	2	0
2	Madison Keys (USA)	●								●				2	0	0
2	Amanda Anisimova (USA)						● ●							2	0	0
2	Asia Muhammad (USA)							●			●			0	2	0
2	Demi Schuurs (NED)							●			●			0	2	0
2	Victoria Mboko (CAN)						●					●		2	0	0
2	Sorana Cîrstea (ROU)							●				●		1	1	0
2	Belinda Bencic (SUI)									● ●				2	0	0
2	Guo Hanyu (CHN)										● ●			0	2	0
2	Alexandra Panova										● ●			0	2	0
2	Leylah Fernandez (CAN)									●		●		2	0	0
2	Cristina Bucșa (ESP)										●		●	0	2	0
2	Irina Khromacheva										●		●	0	2	0
2	Katarzyna Piter (POL)										●		●	0	2	0
2	Anna Blinkova											●	●	1	1	0
2	Marie Bouzková (CZE)											●	●	1	1	0
2	Anna Danilina (KAZ)												● ●	0	2	0
2	Nadiia Kichenok (UKR)												● ●	0	2	0
2	Aleksandra Krunić (SRB)												● ●	0	2	0
2	Makoto Ninomiya (JPN)												● ●	0	2	0
2	Wu Fang-hsien (TPE)												● ●	0	2	0
1	Olivia Gadecki (AUS)			●										0	0	1
1	Storm Hunter (AUS)							●						0	1	0
1	Anna Kalinskaya							●						0	1	0
1	Ekaterina Alexandrova									●				1	0	0
1	Iva Jovic (USA)									●				1	0	0
1	Tatjana Maria (GER)									●				1	0	0
1	Emma Navarro (USA)									●				1	0	0
1	Markéta Vondroušová (CZE)									●				1	0	0
1	Barbora Krejčíková (CZE)										●			0	1	0
1	Tereza Mihalíková (SVK)										●			0	1	0
1	Olivia Nicholls (GBR)										●			0	1	0
1	Ellen Perez (AUS)										●			0	1	0
1	Liudmila Samsonova										●			0	1	0
1	Mayar Sherif (EGY)										●			0	1	0
1	Zhang Shuai (CHN)										●			0	1	0
1	Irina-Camelia Begu (ROU)											●		1	0	0
1	Loïs Boisson (FRA)											●		1	0	0
1	Ann Li (USA)											●		1	0	0
1	Camila Osorio (COL)											●		1	0	0
1	Anastasia Potapova											●		1	0	0
1	Tiantsoa Rakotomanga Rajaonah (FRA)											●		1	0	0
1	Elina Svitolina (UKR)											●		1	0	0
1	Clara Tauson (DEN)											●		1	0	0
1	Veronika Erjavec (SLO)												●	0	1	0
1	Quinn Gleason (USA)												●	0	1	0
1	Beatriz Haddad Maia (BRA)												●	0	1	0
1	Oksana Kalashnikova (GEO)												●	0	1	0
1	Magali Kempen (BEL)												●	0	1	0
1	Desirae Krawczyk (USA)												●	0	1	0
1	Kristina Mladenovic (FRA)												●	0	1	0
1	Giuliana Olmos (MEX)												●	0	1	0
1	Elena Pridankina												●	0	1	0
1	Sabrina Santamaria (USA)												●	0	1	0
1	Laura Siegemund (GER)												●	0	1	0
1	Anna Sisková (CZE)												●	0	1	0
1	Sara Sorribes Tormo (ESP)												●	0	1	0
1	Fanny Stollár (HUN)												●	0	1	0
1	Aldila Sutjiadi (INA)												●	0	1	0
1	Panna Udvardy (HUN)												●	0	1	0
1	Wang Yafan (CHN)												●	0	1	0
1	Yuan Yue (CHN)												●	0	1	0

=== Titles won by nation ===
Total	Nation	Grand Slam			Year-end		WTA 1000			WTA 500		WTA 250		Total		
Total	Nation	S	D	X	S	D	S	D	X	S	D	S	D	S	D	X
27	United States (USA)	2	1				3	3		5	5	4	4	14	13	0
9	Czech Republic (CZE)		1	1				2		1	1	1	2	2	6	1
8	Italy (ITA)		1	2			1	3	1					1	4	3
7	Canada (CAN)		1				1	1		1	1	2		4	3	0
7	China (CHN)										3		4	0	7	0
6	Australia (AUS)			1				1			1	2	1	2	3	1
6	Hungary (HUN)										3		3	0	6	0
5	Belgium (BEL)		1			1						2	1	2	3	0
5	Poland (POL)	1					1			1	1		1	3	2	0
5	Kazakhstan (KAZ)				1					2			2	3	2	0
5	Brazil (BRA)										3		2	0	5	0
4	New Zealand (NZL)		1					1			2			0	4	0
3	Romania (ROU)							1				2		2	1	0
3	Latvia (LAT)									1	2			1	2	0
3	France (FRA)											2	1	2	1	0
3	Indonesia (INA)											1	3	1	2	0
3	Ukraine (UKR)											1	2	1	2	0
2	Netherlands (NED)							1			1			0	2	0
2	Switzerland (SUI)									2				2	0	0
2	Germany (GER)									1			1	1	1	0
2	Spain (ESP)										1		1	0	2	0
2	Chinese Taipei (TPE)												2	0	2	0
2	Japan (JPN)												2	0	2	0
2	Serbia (SRB)												2	0	2	0
1	Egypt (EGY)										1			0	1	0
1	Great Britain (GBR)										1			0	1	0
1	Slovakia (SVK)										1			0	1	0
1	Colombia (COL)											1		1	0	0
1	Denmark (DEN)											1		1	0	0
1	Georgia (GEO)												1	0	1	0
1	Mexico (MEX)												1	0	1	0
1	Slovenia (SLO)												1	0	1	0

=== Titles information ===
The following players won their first main circuit title in singles, doubles, or mixed doubles:

Singles

- (Australia) Maya Joint (19 years, 38 days) – Rabat (draw)
- (France) Loïs Boisson (22 years, 65 days) – Hamburg (draw)
- (Canada) Victoria Mboko (18 years, 346 days) – Montreal (draw)
- (France) Tiantsoa Rakotomanga Rajaonah (19 years, 273 days) – São Paulo (draw)
- (United States) Iva Jovic (17 years, 282 days) – Guadalajara (draw)
- (Indonesia) Janice Tjen (23 years, 180 days) – Chennai (draw)

Doubles

- Mirra Andreeva (17 years, 250 days) – Brisbane (draw)
- Diana Shnaider (20 years, 277 days) – Brisbane (draw)
- (Belgium) Magali Kempen (27 years, 71 days) – Cluj-Napoca (draw)
- (Czech Republic) Anna Sisková (23 years, 223 days) – Cluj-Napoca (draw)
- (Australia) Maya Joint (19 years, 37 days) – Rabat (draw)
- (Slovenia) Veronika Erjavec (25 years, 202 days) – Iași (draw)
- (Hungary) Panna Udvardy (26 years, 295 days) – Iași (draw)
- (United States) McCartney Kessler (26 years, 29 days) – Montreal (draw)
- (Indonesia) Janice Tjen (23 years, 173 days) – Guangzhou (draw)
- Elena Pridankina (20 years, 65 days) – Jiujiang (draw)

Mixed

- (Australia) Olivia Gadecki (22 years, 275 days) – **Australian Open** (draw)

The following players defended a main circuit title in singles, doubles, or mixed doubles:

Singles

- (Colombia) Camila Osorio – Bogota (draw)
- Aryna Sabalenka – **US Open** (draw)

Doubles

- (Czech Republic) Kateřina Siniaková – Dubai (draw)
- (Spain) Cristina Bucșa – Bogota (draw)
- (Italy) Sara Errani – Rome (draw), Beijing (draw)
- (Italy) Jasmine Paolini – Rome (draw), Beijing (draw)
- (United States) Taylor Townsend – Washington DC (draw)
- (New Zealand) Erin Routliffe – Cincinnati (draw)
- Irina Khromacheva – Guadalajara (draw)

Mixed

- (Italy) Sara Errani – **US Open** (draw)

=== Best ranking ===
The following players achieved their career-high ranking in this season inside top 50 (players who made their top 10 highest rank indicated in bold): (Note: Name and ranking in bold means the player entered the top 10 or became world No. 1 for the first time this year, and only the ranking in bold means the player had entered the top 10 in a previous season (before 2025) but reached a new career-high ranking this year.)

Singles

- (Croatia) Donna Vekić (reached place No. 17 on January 27)
- (Kazakhstan) Yulia Putintseva (reached place No. 20 on January 27)
- (United States) Madison Keys (reached place **No. 5** on February 24)
- (Armenia) Elina Avanesyan (reached place No. 36 on March 17)
- Diana Shnaider (reached place No. 11 on May 5)
- (Japan) Moyuka Uchijima (reached place No. 47 on May 5)
- (United States) Peyton Stearns (reached place No. 28 on May 19)
- (China) Zheng Qinwen (reached place **No. 4** on June 16)
- (United States) McCartney Kessler (reached place No. 30 on June 30)
- **Mirra Andreeva** (reached place **No. 5** on July 14)
- (United States) Ashlyn Krueger (reached place No. 29 on July 14)
- (Serbia) Olga Danilović (reached place No. 32 on July 14)
- (Slovakia) Rebecca Šramková (reached place No. 33 on July 14)
- (Germany) Tatjana Maria (reached place No. 36 on July 14)
- (United Kingdom) Sonay Kartal (reached place No. 44 on July 14)
- (Spain) Jéssica Bouzas Maneiro (reached place No. 40 on August 18)
- (United States) Hailey Baptiste (reached place No. 47 on August 25)
- (United States) **Amanda Anisimova** (reached place **No. 4** on September 8)
- (Denmark) Clara Tauson (reached place No. 12 on September 8)
- **Ekaterina Alexandrova** (reached place **No. 10** on October 13)
- (Colombia) Emiliana Arango (reached place No. 46 on October 13)
- (Australia) Maya Joint (reached place No. 32 on October 20)
- (United States) Iva Jovic (reached place No. 33 on October 20)
- (Czech Republic) Linda Nosková (reached place No. 13 on October 27)
- (United States) Ann Li (reached place No. 33 on October 27)
- (Romania) Jaqueline Cristian (reached place No. 39 on October 27)
- (Canada) Victoria Mboko (reached place No. 18 on November 3)
- (France) Loïs Boisson (reached place No. 36 on November 3)
- (Germany) Eva Lys (reached place No. 40 on November 3)
- (Philippines) Alexandra Eala (reached place No. 50 on November 3)

Doubles

- (United States) Sofia Kenin (reached place No. 21 on January 27)
- Irina Khromacheva (reached place No. 14 on March 3)
- (United States) **Asia Muhammad** (reached place **No. 8** on March 17)
- (Poland) Katarzyna Piter (reached place No. 49 on June 9)
- **Diana Shnaider** (reached place **No. 8** on June 16)
- (United Kingdom) Olivia Nicholls (reached place No. 23 on June 23)
- (Slovakia) Tereza Mihalíková (reached place No. 27 on June 23)
- (Kazakhstan) Anna Danilina (reached place **No. 8** on June 30)
- (Latvia) Jeļena Ostapenko (reached place **No. 3** on July 14)
- (United States) **Taylor Townsend** (reached place **No. 1** on July 28)
- Anna Kalinskaya (reached place No. 37 on August 11)
- (United States) Peyton Stearns (reached place No. 49 on August 25)
- (Chinese Taipei) Wu Fang-hsien (reached place No. 27 on September 8)
- Liudmila Samsonova (reached place No. 36 on September 8)
- Ekaterina Alexandrova (reached place No. 41 on September 8)
- (United States) McCartney Kessler (reached place No. 47 on September 8)
- Mirra Andreeva (reached place No. 12 on September 15)
- (Japan) Eri Hozumi (reached place No. 27 on October 6)
- Alexandra Panova (reached place No. 19 on October 13)
- (Hungary) Fanny Stollár (reached place No. 25 on October 13)
- (China) Guo Hanyu (reached place No. 19 on October 20)
- (Italy) Jasmine Paolini (reached place **No. 3** on October 27)
- (Serbia) Aleksandra Krunić (reached place No. 17 on October 27)
- (China) Jiang Xinyu (reached place No. 25 on November 3)

== WTA rankings ==
=== Singles ===
Final Singles Race rankings
No.	Player	Points	Tourn
1	Aryna Sabalenka	9,870	20
2	Iga Świątek (POL)	8,195	20
3	Coco Gauff (USA)	6,563	20
4	Amanda Anisimova (USA)	5,887	21
5	Jessica Pegula (USA)	5,183	22
6	**Elena Rybakina** (KAZ)	4,350	22
7	Madison Keys (USA)	4,335	20
8	Jasmine Paolini (ITA)	4,325	19
9	Mirra Andreeva	4,319	19
10	Ekaterina Alexandrova	3,375	26
11	Belinda Bencic (SUI)	3,075	20
12	Clara Tauson (DEN)	2,770	23
13	Linda Nosková (CZE)	2,641	25
14	Elina Svitolina (UKR)	2,606	20
15	Emma Navarro (USA)	2,515	25
16	Naomi Osaka (JPN)	2,372	19
17	Liudmila Samsonova	2,209	23
18	Karolína Muchová (CZE)	1,966	17
19	Elise Mertens (BEL)	1,969	23
20	Diana Shnaider	1,866	26

WTA Singles Year-End Rankings
#	Player	Points	#Trn	'24 Rk	High	Low	'24→'25
1	Aryna Sabalenka	10,870	21	1	1	1	Steady
2	Iga Świątek (POL)	8,395	21	2	2	8	Steady
3	Coco Gauff (USA)	6,763	21	3	2	4	Steady
4	Amanda Anisimova (USA)	6,287	23	36	4	41	▲32
5	Elena Rybakina (KAZ)	5,850	23	6	5	13	▲1
6	Jessica Pegula (USA)	5,583	23	7	3	7	▲1
7	Madison Keys (USA)	4,335	21	21	5	21	▲14
8	Jasmine Paolini (ITA)	4,325	19	4	4	9	▼4
9	Mirra Andreeva	4,319	19	16	5	16	▲7
10	Ekaterina Alexandrova	3,375	27	28	10	31	▲18
11	Belinda Bencic (SUI)	3,168	22	913	11	913	▲902
12	Clara Tauson (DEN)	2,770	23	52	12	52	▲40
13	Linda Nosková (CZE)	2,641	25	26	13	39	▲13
14	Elina Svitolina (UKR)	2,606	20	23	13	29	▲9
15	Emma Navarro (USA)	2,515	25	8	8	18	▼7
16	Naomi Osaka (JPN)	2,487	20	59	14	61	▲43
17	Liudmila Samsonova	2,209	23	27	16	27	▲11
18	Victoria Mboko (CAN)	2,157	24	350	18	350	▲332
19	Karolína Muchová (CZE)	1,996	17	22	12	22	▲3
20	Elise Mertens (BEL)	1,969	20	34	20	34	▲14

==== No. 1 ranking ====
Holder	Date gained	Date forfeited
Aryna Sabalenka	**Year-end 2024**	**Year-end 2025**

=== Doubles ===
Final Doubles Race rankings
No.	Player	Points	Tourn
1	Sara Errani (ITA); Jasmine Paolini (ITA)	7,115	14
2	Kateřina Siniaková (CZE); Taylor Townsend (USA)	6,290	7
3	Gabriela Dabrowski (CAN); Erin Routliffe (NZL)	5,378	16
4	**Elise Mertens** (BEL); **Veronika Kudermetova**	4,968	9
5	Mirra Andreeva; Diana Shnaider	4,660	14
6	Hsieh Su-wei (TPE); Jeļena Ostapenko (LAT)	4,291	9
7	Timea Babos (HUN); Luisa Stefani (BRA)	3,900	19
8	Asia Muhammad (USA); Demi Schuurs (NED)	3,430	22
9	Aleksandra Krunic (SRB); Anna Danilina (KAZ)	3,218	9
10	Alexandra Panova; Guo Hanyu (CHN)	2,822	12

**Champions** in bold
Runners-up in italics

Qualified for the WTA Finals.

WTA Doubles Year-End Rankings
#	Player	Points	#Trn	'24 Rk	High	Low	'24→'25
1	Kateřina Siniaková (CZE)	8,780	15	1	1	2	Steady
2	Taylor Townsend (USA)	8,485	14	5	1	5	▲3
3	Jasmine Paolini (ITA)	7,195	15	10	3	11	▲7
3	Sara Errani (ITA)	7,195	15	8	3	10	▲5
5	Elise Mertens (BEL)	6,730	15	9	5	32	▲4
6	Veronika Kudermetova	6,635	18	11	4	19	▲11
7	Jeļena Ostapenko (LAT)	6,405	20	6	3	8	▼1
8	Erin Routliffe (NZL)	6,330	23	2	2	8	▼6
9	Hsieh Su-wei (TPE)	6,108	18	7	6	15	▼2
10	Gabriela Dabrowski (CAN)	5,666	18	3	3	10	▼7
11	Diana Shnaider	5,160	16	50	17	37	▲39
12	Mirra Andreeva	4,660	14	69	12	51	▲57
13	Timea Babos (HUN)	4,645	28	55	13	54	▲42
14	Luisa Stefani (BRA)	4,600	25	28	14	41	▲14
15	Anna Danilina (KAZ)	4,485	27	22	8	22	▲7
16	Shuai Zhang (CHN)	4,095	22	27	8	27	▲11
17	Aleksandra Krunic (SRB)	3,784	16	67	17	106	▲50
18	Nicole Melichar-Martinez (USA)	3,560	28	12	11	23	▼6
19	Asia Muhammad (USA)	3,505	23	15	8	20	▼4
20	Alexandra Panova	3,435	24	30	19	33	▲10

==== No. 1 ranking ====
Holder	Date gained	Date forfeited
Kateřina Siniaková (CZE)	**Year-end 2024**	27 July 2025
Taylor Townsend (USA)	28 July 2025	21 September 2025
Kateřina Siniaková (CZE)	22 September 2025	**Year-end 2025**

== Points distribution ==
Points are awarded as follows:

Category	W	F	SF	QF	R16	R32	R64	R128	Q	Q3	Q2	Q1
Grand Slam (S)	2000	1300	780	430	240	130	70	10	40	30	20	2
Grand Slam (D)	2000	1300	780	430	240	130	10	–	–	–	–	–
WTA Finals (S/D)	1500*	1000*	600*	(+200 per round robin win)								
WTA 1000 (96S)	1000	650	390	215	120	65	35	10	30	–	20	2
WTA 1000 (64/56S)	1000	650	390	215	120	65	10	–	30	–	20	2
WTA 1000 (28/32D)	1000	650	390	215	120	10	–	–	–	–	–	–
WTA 500 (64/56/48S)	500	325	195	108	60	32	1	–	25	–	13	1
WTA 500 (32/30/28S)	500	325	195	108	60	1	–	–	25	–	13	1
WTA 500 (28D)	500	325	195	108	60	1	–	–	–	–	–	–
WTA 500 (16D)	500	325	195	108	1	–	–	–	–	–	–	–
WTA 250 (32S, 24/16Q)	250	163	98	54	30	1	–	–	18	–	12	1
WTA 250 (16D)	250	163	98	54	1	–	–	–	–	–	–	–
United Cup	500 (max)	For details, see 2025 United Cup										

S = singles players, D = doubles teams, Q = qualification players
* Assumes undefeated round robin match record

== Prize money leaders ==
Prize money in US$ as of 1 December 2025
No.	Player	Singles	Doubles	Mixed	Year-to-date
1	Aryna Sabalenka	$15,008,519	$0	$0	$15,008,519
2	(Poland) Iga Świątek	$9,912,532	$0	$200,000	$10,112,532
3	(Kazakhstan) Elena Rybakina	$8,430,162	$16,470	$10,000	$8,456,632
4	(United States) Coco Gauff	$7,780,905	$188,940	$0	$7,969,845
5	(United States) Amanda Anisimova	$7,250,577	$0	$10,000	$7,260,577
6	(United States) Jessica Pegula	$5,087,528	$74,783	$100,000	$5,262,311
7	(Italy) Jasmine Paolini	$4,061,399	$1,192,598	$0	$5,253,997
8	Mirra Andreeva	$3,958,152	$718,074	$50,000	$4,726,226
9	(United States) Madison Keys	$4,324,887	$22,900	$10,000	$4,357,787
10	(Belgium) Elise Mertens	$1,399,320	$1,495,709	$0	$2,895,029

== Retirements ==
The following is a list of notable players (winners of a main tour title, and/or part of the WTA rankings top 100 in singles, or top 100 in doubles, for at least one week) who announced their retirement from professional tennis, became inactive (after not playing for more than 52 weeks), or were permanently banned from playing, during the 2025 season:

- (Belgium) Ysaline Bonaventure joined the professional tour in 2011 and reached a career-high ranking of No. 81 in singles in May 2023 and No. 57 in doubles in February 2016. She won two doubles titles. Bonaventure retired from professional tennis in March 2025, after struggling to recover from a knee injury. Her final appearance was at the 2025 Miami Open.
- (Canada) Eugenie Bouchard joined the professional tour in 2009 and reached a career-high ranking of No. 5 in singles in October 2014. She won one career singles title and one career doubles title. Bouchard announced her retirement from professional tennis in July 2025, with the 2025 National Bank Open in Montreal to be her final tournament.
- (France) Alizé Cornet joined the professional tour in 2006 and reached a career-high ranking of No. 11 in singles in February 2009 and No. 59 in doubles in March 2011. She has won six singles and three doubles titles. Following a brief comeback, Cornet announced her second retirement from tennis in September 2025, citing other work projects as the reason. Her final appearance was at the 2025 Open Internacional de San Sebastián.
- (United States) Lauren Davis joined the professional tour in 2011 and reached a career-high ranking of No. 26 in singles in May 2017. She won two singles titles. Davis announced her retirement in November 2025.
- (Venezuela) Andrea Gámiz joined the professional tour in 2006 and reached a career-high ranking of No. 77 in doubles in June 2023. Gámiz announced her retirement in November 2025.
- (France) Caroline Garcia joined the professional tour in 2011 and reached career-high rankings of No. 4 in singles in September 2018 and No. 2 in doubles in October 2016. She won eleven singles (including the 2022 WTA Finals) and eight doubles titles, including two major doubles titles at the 2017 and 2022 French Opens. Garcia announced on 23 May 2025 that she will retire at the end of the 2025 season.

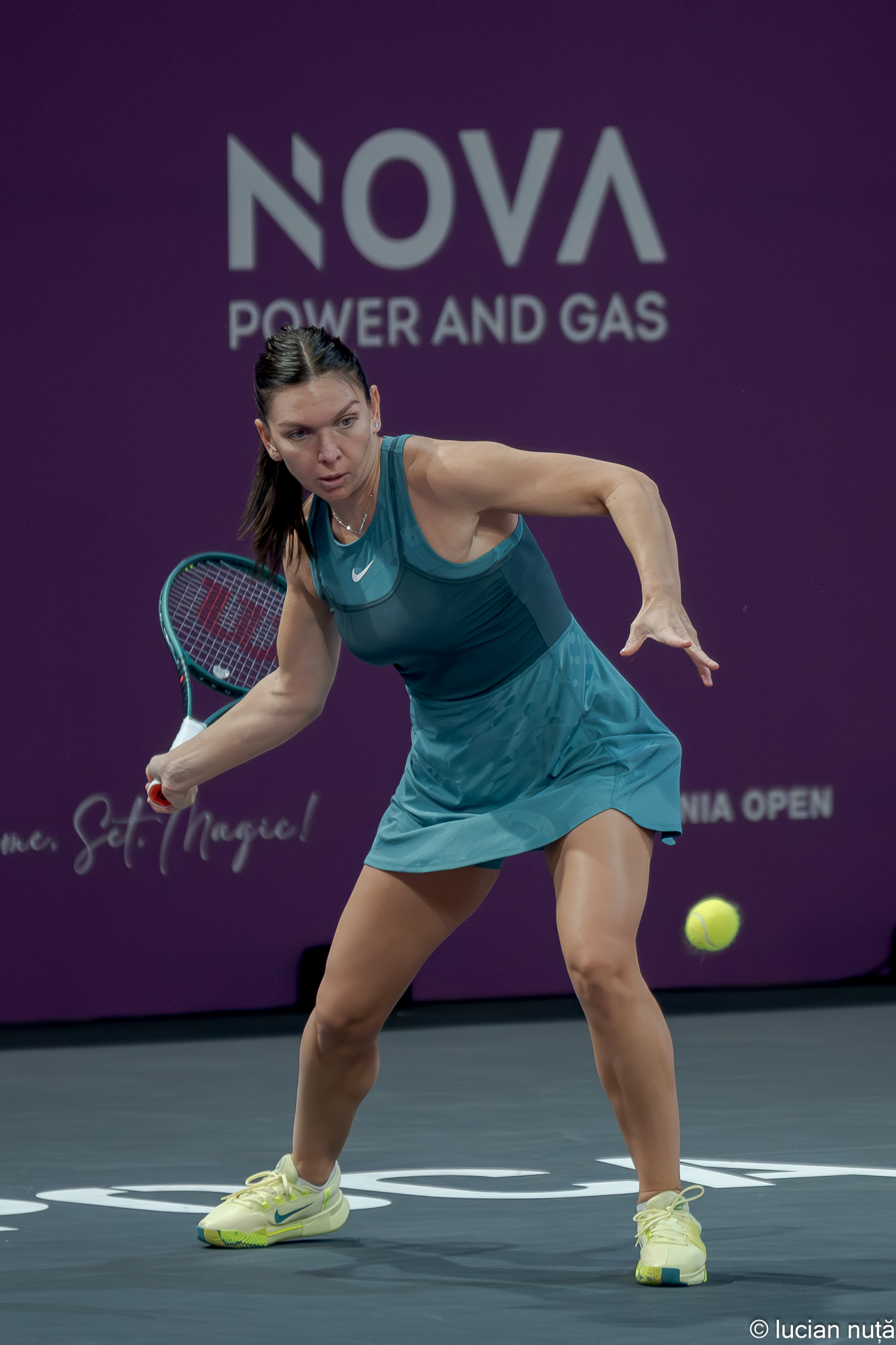
Halep was a former world No. 1 and two-time Grand Slam champion (pictured at the 2025 Transylvania Open, the last tournament of her career).

- (Romania) Simona Halep announced her retirement from professional tennis on 4 February 2025 following her first-round loss against Lucia Bronzetti at the Transylvania Open. Halep turned professional in 2006 and made her top 100 debut in July 2010. She is a two-time Grand Slam champion, having won at the 2018 French Open and 2019 Wimbledon Championships, in addition to being a three-time Grand Slam finalist. Throughout her career, she won 24 singles titles and one doubles title. In October 2017, at the age of 26, she became the second-oldest woman to make her maiden ascension to world No. 1, a position she held for 64 weeks, and was the first Romanian woman to hold the ranking. Between January 2014 and July 2021, Halep spent 373 consecutive weeks ranked inside the top 10, making her streak the eighth longest in WTA history. In 2022, Halep tested positive for the banned substance roxadustat at the US Open and she was given a four-year ban from the sport in 2023 by the International Tennis Federation. But in February 2024, she filed a successful appeal with the Court of Arbitration for Sport, reducing her suspension to nine months, which she was deemed to have served. Halep made a brief return to tennis, but her comeback was interrupted by numerous injury setbacks, including recurring knee and shoulder pain, all of which preceded her retirement from the sport.
- (Netherlands) Michaëlla Krajicek turned professional in 2003, reaching career-high rankings of No. 30 in singles in February 2008 and No. 23 in doubles in March 2015. She won 3 singles and 5 doubles titles. Krajicek finished her career with a ceremony celebrating it in 's-Hertogenbosch.
- (Czech Republic) Petra Kvitová joined the professional tour in 2006 and reached a career high ranking of No. 2 in singles in 31 October 2011. She won 31 career singles titles, including two Wimbledon titles. Kvitová announced her retirement on 19 June 2025, with the 2025 US Open to be her final tournament.
- (Japan) Akiko Omae joined the professional tour in 2011 and reached a career-high ranking of No. 95 in doubles in November 2016. Omae announced her retirement from professional tennis in September 2025.
- (Netherlands) Bibiane Schoofs joined the professional tour in 2011 and reached a career-high ranking of No. 77 in doubles in November 2023. She won three doubles titles. Schoofs announced her retirement from professional tennis in October 2025, having made her final professional appearance at the 2025 US Open.
- (China) Wang Qiang joined the professional tour in 2006 and reached career-high rankings of No. 12 in singles in September 2019. She won two singles titles. Wang announced her retirement from professional tennis in November 2025.
- (Belgium) Yanina Wickmayer joined the professional tour in 2004 and reached career-high rankings of No. 12 in singles in April 2010 and No. 61 in doubles in September 2023. She won five singles and four doubles titles. Wickmayer announced her retirement from professional tennis in May 2025, with her final appearances to be at the French Open and Wimbledon.

=== Inactivity ===
- (Estonia) Kaia Kanepi became inactive having not played a match since Roland Garros qualification in 2024.
- (Turkey) Pemra Özgen became inactive having not played for more than a year since November 2024.
- (Ukraine) Lesia Tsurenko became inactive having not played a match since Billie Jean King Cup in November 2024.

==== Maternity ====
- (Tunisia) Ons Jabeur
- (Australia) Daria Saville
- (Slovakia) Anna Karolína Schmiedlová
- (Denmark) Caroline Wozniacki

== Comebacks and appearances ==
- (Romania) Mihaela Buzărnescu returned to the WTA Tour in May 2025, after three years of absence, using protected ranking at the 2025 French Open qualifying event.
- (France) Alizé Cornet announced her return to the WTA tour in March 2025, after ten months of retirement, at the 2025 Open de Rouen where she received a wildcard. However, she withdrew due to injury before the tournament. She subsequently entered the main draw of the 2025 Internationaux de Strasbourg with a wildcard.
- (Serbia) Ivana Jorović
- (Czech Republic) Petra Kvitová announced her return to the WTA tour in February 2025, after her maternity leave, at the 2025 ATX Open having been awarded a wildcard into the main draw.
- (United States) Christina McHale
- (Czech Republic) Karolína Plíšková returned to the WTA Tour in September 2025, after over a year of inactivity, receiving a wildcard for the 2025 Caldas da Rainha Ladies Open.
- (Switzerland) Stefanie Vögele
- (Kazakhstan) Galina Voskoboeva returned to the WTA Tour in July 2025, after four years of inactivity, at the 2025 Mubadala Citi Open, partnering Kamilla Rakhimova in the doubles event.
- (United States) Venus Williams returned to the WTA Tour in July 2025, after 16 months of inactivity, receiving wildcards for the 2025 Mubadala Citi DC Open.
- Vera Zvonareva returned at the Al Habtoor Tennis Challenge in Dubai, after over a year of inactivity, having last played French Open qualifying in May 2024.

== See also ==
- 2025 ATP Tour
- 2025 WTA 125 tournaments
- 2025 ITF Women's World Tennis Tour
