= 2025 ASB Classic – Men's singles =

Men's singles
- 2025 ASB Classic

Final
- Champion: (France) Gaël Monfils
- Runner-up: (Belgium) Zizou Bergs
- Score: 6–3, 6–4

Details
- Draw: 28
- Seeds: 8

Events
| Singles | men | women |
| Doubles | men | women |
- ATP Auckland Open

Gaël Monfils defeated Zizou Bergs in the final, 6–3, 6–4 to win the men's singles tennis title at the 2025 ASB Classic. It was his 13th ATP Tour title. Aged 38 years and 131 days old, Monfils became the oldest men's singles champion on the ATP Tour up to then, and the fourth-oldest men's singles tour-level champion in the Open Era.

Alejandro Tabilo was the defending champion, but lost in the second round to Nishesh Basavareddy.

== Seeds ==
The top four seeds received a bye into the second round.

1. (United States) Ben Shelton (second round)
2. (Chile) Alejandro Tabilo (second round)
3. (Argentina) Sebastián Báez (second round)
4. (Argentina) Francisco Cerúndolo (second round)
5. (France) Giovanni Mpetshi Perricard (withdrew)
6. (Italy) Flavio Cobolli (first round, retired)
7. (Portugal) Nuno Borges (semifinals)
8. (United States) Alex Michelsen (quarterfinals)
9. (Germany) Jan-Lennard Struff (second round)

== Draw ==
Key

- Q = Qualifier
- WC = Wild card
- LL = Lucky loser
- Alt = Alternate
- ITF = ITF entry
- PR = Protected ranking
- SR = Special ranking
- SE = Special exempt
- JE = Junior exempt
- JR = Junior Accelerator Programme entrant
- CO = College Accelerator Programme entrant
- NG = Next Gen Accelerator Program entrant
- w/o = Walkover
- r = Retired
- d = Defaulted

=== Finals ===
Semifinals
7 | (Portugal) Nuno Borges | 2 | 6 | 5
Q | (Belgium) Zizou Bergs | 6 | 3 | 7
(France) Gaël Monfils | 7^{7} | 6
Q | (United States) Nishesh Basavareddy | 6^{5} | 4

Final
Q | (Belgium) Zizou Bergs | 3 | 4
(France) Gaël Monfils | 6 | 6

=== Top half ===
First round
LL | (Spain) P Carreño Busta | 2 | 6 | 5
(Czech Republic) J Menšík | 6 | 4 | 7
(Argentina) M Navone | 7^{8} | 6^{5} | 6
LL | (France) A Mannarino | 6^{6} | 7^{7} | 1
(Italy) L Darderi | 7 | 3 | 5
7 | (Portugal) N Borges | 5 | 6 | 7
(Spain) R Carballés Baena | 6 | 3 | 7
LL | (Germany) D Altmaier | 3 | 6 | 5
Q | (Belgium) Z Bergs | 6 | 7
WC | (New Zealand) I Becroft | 3 | 5
Q | (Italy) L Nardi | 6 | 1
6 | (Italy) F Cobolli | 2 | 1^{r}

Second round
1 | (United States) B Shelton | 6^{2} | 6 | 5
(Czech Republic) J Menšík | 7^{7} | 4 | 7
(Argentina) M Navone | 6 | 5 | 4
7 | (Portugal) N Borges | 4 | 7 | 6
4 | (Argentina) F Cerúndolo | 2 | 5
(Spain) R Carballés Baena | 6 | 7
Q | (Belgium) Z Bergs | 6 | 6
Q | (Italy) L Nardi | 1 | 4

Quarterfinals
(Czech Republic) J Menšík | 7^{7} | 2 | 6^{4}
7 | (Portugal) N Borges | 6^{4} | 6 | 7^{7}
(Spain) R Carballés Baena | 6 | 2 | 3
Q | (Belgium) Z Bergs | 1 | 6 | 6

Semifinals
7 | (Portugal) N Borges | 2 | 6 | 5
Q | (Belgium) Z Bergs | 6 | 3 | 7

=== Bottom half ===
First round
9 | (Germany) J-L Struff | 6 | 6
(China) Y Bu | 3 | 4
(Spain) P Martínez | 6 | 6^{5} | 3
(France) G Monfils | 1 | 7^{7} | 6
(United Kingdom) C Norrie | 2 | 3
LL | (Argentina) F Díaz Acosta | 6 | 6
8 | (United States) A Michelsen | 6^{8} | 6 | 6
Q | (India) S Nagal | 7^{10} | 4 | 2
WC | (Canada) G Diallo | 6^{5} | 6 | 6^{7}
(Italy) L Sonego | 7^{7} | 2 | 7^{9}
Q | (United States) N Basavareddy | 6 | 6
LL | (Argentina) F Comesaña | 2 | 2

Second round
9 | (Germany) J-L Struff | 1 | 6^{5}
(France) G Monfils | 6 | 7^{7}
LL | (Argentina) F Díaz Acosta | 6 | 7^{7}
3 | (Argentina) S Báez | 4 | 6^{1}
8 | (United States) A Michelsen | 7^{7} | 6
(Italy) L Sonego | 6^{3} | 2
Q | (United States) N Basavareddy | 6 | 5 | 6
2 | (Chile) A Tabilo | 4 | 7 | 4

Quarterfinals
(France) G Monfils | 6 | 6
LL | (Argentina) F Díaz Acosta | 3 | 1
8 | (United States) A Michelsen | 6 | 2 | 4
Q | (United States) N Basavareddy | 2 | 6 | 6

Semifinals
(France) G Monfils | 7^{7} | 6
Q | (United States) N Basavareddy | 6^{5} | 4

== Qualifying ==
=== Seeds ===
1. (France) Adrian Mannarino (qualifying competition, lucky loser)
2. (Belgium) Zizou Bergs (qualified)
3. (Argentina) Facundo Díaz Acosta (qualifying competition, lucky loser)
4. (Netherlands) Botic van de Zandschulp (first round)
5. (Argentina) Francisco Comesaña (qualifying competition, lucky loser)
6. (Germany) Daniel Altmaier (qualifying competition, lucky loser)
7. (Italy) Luca Nardi (qualified)
8. (India) Sumit Nagal (qualified)

=== Qualifiers ===
1. (India) Sumit Nagal
2. (Belgium) Zizou Bergs
3. (Italy) Luca Nardi
4. (United States) Nishesh Basavareddy

=== Lucky losers ===
1. (Argentina) Facundo Díaz Acosta
2. (Argentina) Francisco Comesaña
3. (France) Adrian Mannarino
4. (Germany) Daniel Altmaier
5. (Spain) Pablo Carreño Busta

=== Qualifying draw ===
==== First qualifier ====
First round
1 | (France) Adrian Mannarino | 6 | 6
PR | (Switzerland) Dominic Stricker | 4 | 4
WC | (New Zealand) Alexander Klintcharov | 6 | 3 | 1
8 | (India) Sumit Nagal | 1 | 6 | 6

Qualifying competition
1 | (France) Adrian Mannarino | 6^{5} | 3
8 | (India) Sumit Nagal | 7^{7} | 6

==== Second qualifier ====
First round
2 | (Belgium) Zizou Bergs | 2 | 7^{8} | 6
(Spain) Pablo Carreño Busta | 6 | 6^{6} | 4
Alt | (France) Maxime Janvier | 1 | 7^{7} | 3
5 | (Argentina) Francisco Comesaña | 6 | 6^{5} | 6

Qualifying competition
2 | (Belgium) Zizou Bergs | 3 | 6 | 6
5 | (Argentina) Francisco Comesaña | 6 | 4 | 3

==== Third qualifier ====
First round
3 | (Argentina) Facundo Díaz Acosta | 6 | 6
WC | (New Zealand) Ajeet Rai | 4 | 2
(Germany) Daniel Masur | 7^{7} | 4 | 2
7 | (Italy) Luca Nardi | 6^{3} | 6 | 6

Qualifying competition
3 | (Argentina) Facundo Díaz Acosta | 5 | 7^{7} | 2
7 | (Italy) Luca Nardi | 7 | 6^{2} | 6

==== Fourth qualifier ====
First round
4 | (Netherlands) Botic van de Zandschulp | 7^{7} | 5 | 3
(United States) Nishesh Basavareddy | 6^{3} | 7 | 6
Alt | (United Kingdom) Charles Broom | 5 | 1
6 | (Germany) Daniel Altmaier | 7 | 6

Qualifying competition
(United States) Nishesh Basavareddy | 6 | 6
6 | (Germany) Daniel Altmaier | 2 | 1
