= 2025 ASB Classic – Women's doubles =

Women's doubles
- 2025 ASB Classic

Final
- Champions: (China) Jiang Xinyu (Chinese Taipei) Wu Fang-hsien
- Runners-up: (Serbia) Aleksandra Krunić (United States) Sabrina Santamaria
- Score: 6–3, 6–4

Details
- Draw: 16 (2 WC )
- Seeds: 4

Events
Singles	men	women
Doubles	men	women
← 2024 ·	WTA Auckland Open	· 2026 →

Jiang Xinyu and Wu Fang-hsien defeated Aleksandra Krunić and Sabrina Santamaria in the final, 6–3, 6–4 to win the women's doubles tennis title at the 2025 WTA Auckland Open.

Anna Danilina and Viktória Hrunčáková were the reigning champions, but Hrunčáková did not participate and Danilina chose to compete at Brisbane instead.

== Seeds ==
1. (United States) Sofia Kenin / (Belgium) Elise Mertens (withdrew)
2. (China) Jiang Xinyu / (Chinese Taipei) Wu Fang-hsien (champions)
3. (Japan) Makoto Ninomiya / (Hungary) Fanny Stollár (semifinals)
4. (Poland) Katarzyna Piter / (China) Tang Qianhui (first round)

== Draw ==
=== Key ===
- Q = Qualifier
- WC = Wild card
- LL = Lucky loser
- Alt = Alternate
- ITF = ITF entry
- PR = Protected ranking
- SR = Special ranking
- SE = Special exempt
- JE = Junior exempt
- JR = Junior Accelerator Programme entrant
- CO = College Accelerator Programme entrant
- NG = Next Gen Accelerator Program entrant
- w/o = Walkover
- r = Retired
- d = Defaulted

First round
Alt	(Austria) J Grabher (Brazil) L Pigossi	3	3
(Canada) R Marino (United Kingdom) T Moore	6	6
(United States) S Stephens (Denmark) C Tauson	4	6	[10]
(United States) J Aney (Brazil) I Martins	6	0	[6]
4	(Poland) K Piter (China) Q Tang	6	5	[5]
(Serbia) A Krunić (United States) S Santamaria	3	7	[10]
(United States) Q Gleason (Belgium) K Zimmermann	3	2
(Thailand) P Plipuech (Chinese Taipei) C-y Tsao	6	6
(United States) A Li (United States) K Volynets	6	7
WC	(New Zealand) V Ivanov (New Zealand) V Yang	3	5
(Japan) M Hontama (Japan) E Shibahara	6	5	[8]
3	(Japan) M Ninomiya (Hungary) F Stollár	3	7	[10]
WC	(New Zealand) M Barry (New Zealand) J Otway	6	3	[10]
(Japan) N Hibino (Georgia (country)) O Kalashnikova	3	6	[4]
(United Kingdom) E Appleton (United Kingdom) M Lumsden	4	4
2	(China) X Jiang (Chinese Taipei) F-h Wu	6	6

Quarterfinals
(Canada) R Marino (United Kingdom) T Moore	4	6	[7]
(United States) S Stephens (Denmark) C Tauson	6	3	[10]
(Serbia) A Krunić (United States) S Santamaria	6	6
(Thailand) P Plipuech (Chinese Taipei) C-y Tsao	4	1
(United States) A Li (United States) K Volynets	3	3
3	(Japan) M Ninomiya (Hungary) F Stollár	6	6
WC	(New Zealand) M Barry (New Zealand) J Otway	0	3
2	(China) X Jiang (Chinese Taipei) F-h Wu	6	6

Semifinals
(United States) S Stephens (Denmark) C Tauson	3	0
(Serbia) A Krunić (United States) S Santamaria	6	6
3	(Japan) M Ninomiya (Hungary) F Stollár	6	2	[8]
2	(China) X Jiang (Chinese Taipei) F-h Wu	4	6	[10]

Final
(Serbia) A Krunić (United States) S Santamaria	3	4
2	(China) X Jiang (Chinese Taipei) F-h Wu	6	6
