= 2025 Grand Prix SAR La Princesse Lalla Meryem =

- Date: 19 – 24 May
- Edition: 23rd
- Category: WTA 250
- Draw: 32S / 16D
- Surface: Clay / outdoor
- Location: Rabat, Morocco
- Venue: Club des Cheminots

Champions

Singles
- (Australia) Maya Joint

Doubles
- (Australia) Maya Joint / (Georgia (country)) Oksana Kalashnikova
- Morocco Open

The 2025 Grand Prix SAR La Princesse Lalla Meryem was a professional women's tennis tournament played on clay courts. It was the 23rd edition of the tournament and part of the WTA 250 category of the 2025 WTA Tour. It took place in Rabat, Morocco, between 19 and 24 May 2025.

== Champions ==
=== Singles ===
- (Australia) Maya Joint def. (Romania) Jaqueline Cristian 6–3, 6–2

=== Doubles ===
- (Australia) Maya Joint / (Georgia (country)) Oksana Kalashnikova def. (Italy) Angelica Moratelli / (Italy) Camilla Rosatello, 6–3, 7–5

== Singles main draw entrants ==
=== Seeds ===
Country	Player	Rank^{1}	Seed
~~ARM~~	~~Elina Avanesyan~~	~~38~~	~~1~~
COL	Camila Osorio	55	2
ITA	Lucia Bronzetti	58	3
USA	Ann Li	59	4
BUL	Viktoriya Tomova	61	5
CZE	Kateřina Siniaková	62	6
~~EGY~~	~~Mayar Sherif~~	~~64~~	~~7~~
~~FRA~~	~~Varvara Gracheva~~	~~65~~	~~8~~
USA	Katie Volynets	66	9
ESP	Jéssica Bouzas Maneiro	72	10

- Rankings are as of 5 May 2025.

=== Other entrants ===
The following players received wildcards into the singles main draw:

- (Morocco) Aya El Aouni
- (Morocco) Yasmine Kabbaj
- (Ukraine) Yelyzaveta Kotliar
- (Latvia) Anastasija Sevastova

The following players received entry using a protected ranking into the main draw:

- (Spain) Aliona Bolsova
- (Croatia) Ana Konjuh

The following players received entry from the qualifying draw:

- (United States) Elizabeth Mandlik
- (Burundi) Sada Nahimana
- (Italy) Tatiana Pieri
- (Italy) Camilla Rosatello

The following players received entry as lucky losers:

- (Brazil) Carolina Alves
- (Italy) Nicole Fossa Huergo
- Maria Timofeeva

=== Withdrawals ===
- (Armenia) Elina Avanesyan → replaced by (Brazil) Carolina Alves
- (Australia) Kimberly Birrell → replaced by (Spain) Aliona Bolsova
- (Philippines) Alexandra Eala → replaced by (Austria) Julia Grabher
- (France) Varvara Gracheva → replaced by Maria Timofeeva
- (United States) Alycia Parks → replaced by (Croatia) Ana Konjuh
- (Egypt) Mayar Sherif → replaced by (Italy) Nicole Fossa Huergo
- (United States) Peyton Stearns → replaced by (Spain) Carlota Martínez Círez
- (Romania) Anca Todoni → replaced by (United States) Maria Mateas
- (Japan) Moyuka Uchijima → replaced by (Switzerland) Jil Teichmann

== Doubles main draw entrants ==
=== Seeds ===
Country	Player	Country	Player	Rank^{1}	Seed
KAZ	Anna Danilina		Irina Khromacheva	32	1
NOR	Ulrikke Eikeri	JPN	Eri Hozumi	98	2
~~POL~~	~~Katarzyna Piter~~	~~EGY~~	~~Mayar Sherif~~	~~123~~	~~3~~
GBR	Maia Lumsden	CHN	Tang Qianhui	145	4
CZE	Anastasia Dețiuc	USA	Sabrina Santamaria	155	5

- ^{1} Rankings as of 5 May 2025.

=== Other entrants ===
The following pairs received wildcards into the doubles main draw:

- (Morocco) Aya El Aouni / (Morocco) Diae El Jardi
- (Morocco) Yasmine Kabbaj / (Hungary) Luca Udvardy

The following pair received entry as alternates:

- (United States) Elizabeth Mandlik / (Netherlands) Arantxa Rus

=== Withdrawals ===
- (Poland) Katarzyna Piter / (Egypt) Mayar Sherif → replaced by (United States) Elizabeth Mandlik / (Netherlands) Arantxa Rus
