= 2025 ASB Classic – Men's doubles =

Men's doubles
- 2025 ASB Classic

Final
- Champions: (Croatia) Nikola Mektić (New Zealand) Michael Venus
- Runners-up: (United States) Christian Harrison (United States) Rajeev Ram
- Score: Walkover

Details
- Draw: 16
- Seeds: 4

Events
Singles	men	women
Doubles	men	women
- ATP Auckland Open

Two-time defending champion Nikola Mektić and his partner Michael Venus defeated Christian Harrison and Rajeev Ram by walkover to win the men's doubles tennis title at the 2025 ASB Classic, as Ram was unable to play the final due to injury.

Wesley Koolhof and Mektić were the defending champions, but Koolhof retired from professional tennis in 2024.

== Seeds ==
1. (Croatia) Nikola Mektić / (New Zealand) Michael Venus (champions)
2. (Argentina) Máximo González / (Argentina) Andrés Molteni (semifinals)
3. (United Kingdom) Julian Cash / (United Kingdom) Lloyd Glasspool (quarterfinals)
4. (France) Sadio Doumbia / (France) Fabien Reboul (quarterfinals)

== Draw ==
Key

- Q = Qualifier
- WC = Wild card
- LL = Lucky loser
- Alt = Alternate
- ITF = ITF entry
- PR = Protected ranking
- SR = Special ranking
- SE = Special exempt
- JE = Junior exempt
- JR = Junior Accelerator Programme entrant
- CO = College Accelerator Programme entrant
- NG = Next Gen Accelerator Program entrant
- w/o = Walkover
- r = Retired
- d = Defaulted

=== Draw ===
First round
1	(Croatia) N Mektić (New Zealand) M Venus	6	6
(Mexico) S González (Austria) L Miedler	4	3
WC	(New Zealand) M Daniell (New Zealand) J Watt	6	6^{5}	[2]
Alt	(Spain) P Carreño Busta (Spain) S Martos Gornés	1	7^{7}	[10]
3	(United Kingdom) J Cash (United Kingdom) L Glasspool	6	6
WC	(New Zealand) K Pannu (New Zealand) A Rai	3	1
(India) Y Bhambri (France) A Olivetti	6	6
(Netherlands) S Arends (United Kingdom) L Johnson	4	4
(United States) C Harrison (United States) R Ram	6	7^{8}
(Germany) C Frantzen (Germany) H Jebens	4	6^{6}
(Austria) A Erler (Germany) A Mies	4	3
4	(France) S Doumbia (France) F Reboul	6	6
(Argentina) S Báez (Argentina) F Comesaña	6	6
(China) Y Bu (Spain) P Martínez	3	2
(Uruguay) A Behar (United States) R Galloway	6	5	[6]
2	(Argentina) M González (Argentina) A Molteni	1	7	[10]

Quarterfinals
1	(Croatia) N Mektić (New Zealand) M Venus	6	4	[10]
Alt	(Spain) P Carreño Busta (Spain) S Martos Gornés	4	6	[5]
3	(United Kingdom) J Cash (United Kingdom) L Glasspool	6	4	[10]
(India) Y Bhambri (France) A Olivetti	3	6	[12]
(United States) C Harrison (United States) R Ram	7	6^{4}	[10]
4	(France) S Doumbia (France) F Reboul	5	7^{7}	[5]
(Argentina) S Báez (Argentina) F Comesaña
2	(Argentina) M González (Argentina) A Molteni	w/o

Semifinals
1	(Croatia) N Mektić (New Zealand) M Venus	3	6	[10]
(India) Y Bhambri (France) A Olivetti	6	1	[5]
(United States) C Harrison (United States) R Ram	7^{7}	6^{7}	[10]
2	(Argentina) M González (Argentina) A Molteni	6^{1}	7^{9}	[8]

Final
1	(Croatia) N Mektić (New Zealand) M Venus	w/o
(United States) C Harrison (United States) R Ram
