= 2025 ASB Classic =

- Date: 30 December – 5 January 2025 (women); 6 – 11 January 2025 (men)
- Edition: 38th (women); 47th (men)
- Category: WTA 250; ATP 250
- Draw: 32S / 16D (women); 28S / 16D (men)
- Surface: Hard
- Location: Auckland, New Zealand
- Venue: ASB Tennis Centre

Champions

Men's singles
- (France) Gaël Monfils

Women's singles
- (Denmark) Clara Tauson

Men's doubles
- (Croatia) Nikola Mektić / (New Zealand) Michael Venus

Women's doubles
- (China) Jiang Xinyu / (Chinese Taipei) Wu Fang-hsien
← 2024 ·	Auckland Open	· 2026 →

The 2025 ASB Classic was a joint professional men's and women's tennis tournament played on outdoor hard courts at the ASB Tennis Centre in Auckland. The 38th edition of the women's event (a WTA 250 tournament) was held from 30 December 2024 to 5 January 2025 and the 47th edition of the men's event (an ATP 250 tournament) was held from 6 to 11 January 2025.

== Champions ==
=== Men's singles ===
- (France) Gaël Monfils def. (Belgium) Zizou Bergs, 6–3, 6–4

=== Women's singles ===
- (Denmark) Clara Tauson def. (Japan) Naomi Osaka 4–6 ret.

=== Men's doubles ===
- (Croatia) Nikola Mektić / (New Zealand) Michael Venus def. (United States) Christian Harrison / (United States) Rajeev Ram by walkover

=== Women's doubles ===
- (China) Jiang Xinyu / (Chinese Taipei) Wu Fang-hsien def. (Serbia) Aleksandra Krunić / (United States) Sabrina Santamaria 6–3, 6–4

== Point and prize money distribution ==
=== Points distribution ===
Event	W	F	SF	QF	R16	R32	Q	Q2	Q1
Men's singles	250	165	100	50	25	0	13	7	0
Men's doubles	250	150	90	45	0	—	—	—	—
Women's singles	250	163	98	54	30	1	18	12	1
Women's doubles	250	163	98	54	1	—	—	—	—

=== Prize money ===
The ASB Classic total prize money for the ATP is $680,140, up 2.8%, compared to last year. The total prize money for the WTA event is $275,094, a 3.0% increase compared to last year.

Event	W	F	SF	QF	R16	R32	Q2	Q1
Men's Singles	$103,455	$60,350	$35,480	$20,555	$11,935	$7,295	$3,650	$1,990
Men's Doubles*	$35,980	$19,330	$11,310	$6,270	$3,700	—	—	—
Women's Singles	$36,300	$21,484	$11,970	$6,815	$4,160	$2,975	$2,200	$1,420
Women's Doubles*	$13,200	$7,430	$4,260	$2,540	$1,960	—	—	—

* per team

== ATP singles main draw entrants ==
=== Seeds ===
Country	Player	Rank^{1}	Seed
USA	Ben Shelton	21	1
CHI	Alejandro Tabilo	23	2
ARG	Sebastián Báez	27	3
ARG	Francisco Cerúndolo	30	4
~~FRA~~	~~Giovanni Mpetshi Perricard~~	~~31~~	~~5~~
ITA	Flavio Cobolli	32	6
POR	Nuno Borges	36	7
USA	Alex Michelsen	41	8
GER	Jan-Lennard Struff	42	9

- ^{1} Rankings as of 30 December 2024.

=== Other entrants ===
The following players received wildcards into the singles main draw:

- (New Zealand) Isaac Becroft
- (Canada) Gabriel Diallo
- (France) ~~Lucas Pouille~~

The following players using a special exempt into the main draw:

- ~~(France) Alexandre Müller~~
- ~~(United States) Reilly Opelka~~

The following players received entry from the qualifying draw:

- (United States) Nishesh Basavareddy
- (Belgium) Zizou Bergs
- (India) Sumit Nagal
- (Italy) Luca Nardi

The following players received entry as lucky losers:

- (Germany) Daniel Altmaier
- (Spain) Pablo Carreño Busta
- (Argentina) Francisco Comesaña
- (Argentina) Facundo Díaz Acosta
- (France) Adrian Mannarino

=== Withdrawals ===
- (Hungary) Fábián Marozsán → replaced by (Argentina) Facundo Díaz Acosta
- (France) Giovanni Mpetshi Perricard → replaced by (Argentina) Francisco Comesaña
- (France) Alexandre Müller → replaced by (Spain) Pablo Carreño Busta
- (United States) Reilly Opelka → replaced by (France) Adrian Mannarino
- (France) Lucas Pouille → replaced by (Germany) Daniel Altmaier

== ATP doubles main draw entrants ==
=== Seeds ===
Country	Player	Country	Player	Rank^{1}	Seed
CRO	Nikola Mektić	NZL	Michael Venus	23	1
ARG	Máximo González	ARG	Andrés Molteni	43	2
GBR	Julian Cash	GBR	Lloyd Glasspool	60	3
FRA	Sadio Doumbia	FRA	Fabien Reboul	66	4

- ^{1} Rankings as of 30 December 2024.

=== Other entrants ===
The following pairs received wildcards into the doubles main draw:

- (New Zealand) Marcus Daniell / (New Zealand) James Watt
- (New Zealand) Kiranpal Pannu / (New Zealand) Ajeet Rai

The following pair received entry as alternates:

- (Spain) Pablo Carreño Busta / (Spain) Sergio Martos Gornés

=== Withdrawals ===
- (Spain) Roberto Carballés Baena / (Italy) Luciano Darderi → replaced by (Spain) Pablo Carreño Busta / (Spain) Sergio Martos Gornés

== WTA singles main draw entrants ==
=== Seeds ===
Country	Player	Rank^{1}	Seed
USA	Madison Keys	21	1
~~BEL~~	~~Elise Mertens~~	~~34~~	~~2~~
USA	Amanda Anisimova	36	3
NZL	Lulu Sun	40	4
DEN	Clara Tauson	50	5
~~GBR~~	~~Emma Raducanu~~	~~57~~	~~6~~
JPN	Naomi Osaka	58	7
USA	Katie Volynets	59	8

- ^{1} Rankings as of 23 December 2024.

=== Other entrants ===
The following players received wildcards into the singles main draw:

- (Slovakia) Renáta Jamrichová
- (New Zealand) Vivian Yang

The following player received entry using a protected ranking into the main draw:

- (Austria) Julia Grabher

The following players received entry from the qualifying draw:

- (Germany) Anna-Lena Friedsam
- (Israel) Lina Glushko
- (Japan) Nao Hibino
- (Andorra) Victoria Jiménez Kasintseva
- (Spain) Leyre Romero Gormaz
- (Italy) Lucrezia Stefanini

The following players received entry as lucky losers:

- (United Kingdom) Jodie Burrage
- (Japan) Mai Hontama

=== Withdrawals ===
- (Belgium) Elise Mertens → replaced by (United Kingdom) Jodie Burrage
- (United Kingdom) Emma Raducanu → replaced by (Japan) Mai Hontama

== WTA doubles main draw entrants ==
=== Seeds ===
Country	Player	Country	Player	Rank^{1}	Seed
~~USA~~	~~Sofia Kenin~~	~~BEL~~	~~Elise Mertens~~	~~31~~	~~1~~
CHN	Jiang Xinyu	TPE	Wu Fang-hsien	98	2
JPN	Makoto Ninomiya	HUN	Fanny Stollár	122	3
POL	Katarzyna Piter	CHN	Tang Qianhui	142	4

- ^{1} Rankings as of 23 December 2024.

=== Other entrants ===
The following pairs received a wildcard into the doubles main draw:

- (New Zealand) Monique Barry / (New Zealand) Jade Otway
- (New Zealand) Valentina Ivanov / (New Zealand) Vivian Yang

The following pair received entry into the doubles main draw as alternates:

- (Austria) Julia Grabher / (Brazil) Laura Pigossi

=== Withdrawals ===
- (United States) Sofia Kenin / (Belgium) Elise Mertens → replaced by (Austria) Julia Grabher / (Brazil) Laura Pigossi
