= Jade Otway =

New Zealand tennis player (born 2003)

- Country (sports): New Zealand
- Born: 11 June 2003 (age 23)
- College: Texas Christian University
- Prize money: $8,437

Singles
- Highest ranking: No. 931 (7 December 2023)
- Current ranking: No. 1093 (23 December 2024)

Doubles
- Highest ranking: No. 717 (3 March 2025)
- Current ranking: No. 819 (23 December 2024)
- Last updated on: 29 December 2024.

Jade Otway (born 11 June 2003) is a professional tennis player from New Zealand. She had a career high WTA doubles ranking of no. 727 achieved on 5 February 2024.

== Early life ==
From the Marlborough District of New Zealand, she attended Samuel Marsden Collegiate School in Wellington for whom she won the College Sport Wellington Junior Tennis Championships. She was named tennis player of the year at the 2017 College Sports Wellington (CSW) Awards.

== Career ==
She played for New Zealand in the Junior Federation Cup and was named Tennis New Zealand’s junior female player of the year in 2020.

Competing in American collegiate tennis for the TCU Horned Frogs she was named MVP in the inaugural NIT Universal Tennis Championship in Atlanta, Georgia helping her Texas Christian University team to win the tournament in 2023. In July 2023, she was selected to compete for New Zealand in the Billie Jean King Cup. She was the first women from the Marlborough District to compete in the competition, or the Fed Cup, for New Zealand.

In December 2024, she was awarded a wildcard alongside Monique Barry into the main draw of the women's doubles at the 2025 ASB Classic in Auckland.

== Personal life ==
In 2021, she received a tennis scholarship to attend Texas Christian University, based in Fort Worth, Texas in the United States. She has a twin sister, Kyla, who competes in rowing.
