= 2025 Grand Prix SAR La Princesse Lalla Meryem – Doubles =

Doubles
- 2025 Grand Prix SAR La Princesse Lalla Meryem

Final
- Champions: (Australia) Maya Joint (Georgia (country)) Oksana Kalashnikova
- Runners-up: (Italy) Angelica Moratelli (Italy) Camilla Rosatello
- Score: 6–3, 7–5

Events
Singles	Doubles
- Grand Prix SAR La Princesse Lalla Meryem

Maya Joint and Oksana Kalashnikova defeated Angelica Moratelli and Camilla Rosatello in the final, 6–3, 7–5 to win the doubles tennis title at the 2025 Morocco Open. It was the first WTA Tour doubles title for Joint and seventh for Kalashnikova. Joint became the third player in the tournament's history to win both the singles and doubles titles in the same year, after Patricia Wartusch in 2002 and Émilie Loit in 2004.

Irina Khromacheva and Yana Sizikova were the reigning champions, but Sizikova did not participate this year. Khromacheva partnered Anna Danilina, but they lost in the first round to Aliona Bolsova and Nicole Fossa Huergo.

== Seeds ==
1. (Kazakhstan) Anna Danilina / Irina Khromacheva (first round)
2. (Norway) Ulrikke Eikeri / (Japan) Eri Hozumi (quarterfinals)
3. (Poland) Katarzyna Piter / (Egypt) Mayar Sherif (withdrew)
4. (United Kingdom) Maia Lumsden / (China) Tang Qianhui (semifinals)
5. (Czech Republic) Anastasia Dețiuc / (United States) Sabrina Santamaria (semifinals)

== Draw ==
Key

- Q = Qualifier
- WC = Wild card
- LL = Lucky loser
- Alt = Alternate
- ITF = ITF entry
- PR = Protected ranking
- SR = Special ranking
- SE = Special exempt
- JE = Junior exempt
- JR = Junior Accelerator Programme entrant
- CO = College Accelerator Programme entrant
- NG = Next Gen Accelerator Program entrant
- w/o = Walkover
- r = Retired
- d = Defaulted

=== Draw ===
First round
1	(Kazakhstan) A Danilina; I Khromacheva	4	4
(Spain) A Bolsova (Italy) N Fossa Huergo	6	6
(United States) J Aney (United States) J Failla	6	5	[6]
(Australia) M Joint (Georgia (country)) O Kalashnikova	2	7	[10]
4	(United Kingdom) M Lumsden (China) Q Tang	7^{11}	6
(Spain) Y Cavallé Reimers (Belgium) M Kempen	6^{9}	2
WC	(Morocco) A El Aouni (Morocco) D El Jardi	7^{7}	6
(Netherlands) L Tran; E Yashina	6^{3}	4
(United Kingdom) E Appleton (Netherlands) I Haverlag	6	6
Alt	(United States) E Mandlik (Netherlands) A Rus	0	0
WC	(Morocco) Y Kabbaj (Hungary) L Udvardy	2	3
5	(Czech Republic) A Dețiuc (United States) S Santamaria	6	6
(Italy) A Moratelli (Italy) C Rosatello	6	6
(Belgium) L Salden (Belgium) K Zimmermann	3	4
(United Kingdom) A Barnett (France) E Lechemia	4	6	[8]
2	(Norway) U Eikeri (Japan) E Hozumi	6	4	[10]

Quarterfinals
(Spain) A Bolsova (Italy) N Fossa Huergo	6^{7}	0
(Australia) M Joint (Georgia (country)) O Kalashnikova	7^{9}	6
4	(United Kingdom) M Lumsden (China) Q Tang	6	4	[10]
WC	(Morocco) A El Aouni (Morocco) D El Jardi	3	6	[4]
(United Kingdom) E Appleton (Netherlands) I Haverlag	7^{11}	4	[6]
5	(Czech Republic) A Dețiuc (United States) S Santamaria	6^{9}	6	[10]
(Italy) A Moratelli (Italy) C Rosatello	6	6
2	(Norway) U Eikeri (Japan) E Hozumi	2	4

Semifinals
(Australia) M Joint (Georgia (country)) O Kalashnikova	7	7
4	(United Kingdom) M Lumsden (China) Q Tang	5	5
5	(Czech Republic) A Dețiuc (United States) S Santamaria	6^{3}	3
(Italy) A Moratelli (Italy) C Rosatello	7^{7}	6

Final
(Australia) M Joint (Georgia (country)) O Kalashnikova	6	7
(Italy) A Moratelli (Italy) C Rosatello	3	5
