= 2025 Grand Prix SAR La Princesse Lalla Meryem – Singles =

Singles
- 2025 Grand Prix SAR La Princesse Lalla Meryem

Final
- Champion: (Australia) Maya Joint
- Runner-up: (Romania) Jaqueline Cristian
- Score: 6–3, 6–2

Details
- Draw: 32
- Seeds: 8

Events
Singles	Doubles
- Grand Prix SAR La Princesse Lalla Meryem

Maya Joint defeated Jaqueline Cristian in the final, 6–3, 6–2 to win the singles title at the 2025 Morocco Open. She did not lose a set en route to her first WTA Tour title. Joint was the first Australian woman to win a WTA Tour singles title since Ashleigh Barty at the 2022 Australian Open, and the third player in the tournament's history to win both the singles and doubles titles in the same year, after Patricia Wartusch in 2002 and Émilie Loit in 2004. This also marked the fifth consecutive edition of the tournament being won by a first time titleholder, since 2019.

Peyton Stearns was the reigning champion, but withdrew before the start of the tournament. Sada Nahimana became the first player from Burundi to win a WTA Tour main draw match.

== Seeds ==
1. (Armenia) Elina Avanesyan (withdrew)
2. (Colombia) Camila Osorio (semifinals)
3. (Italy) Lucia Bronzetti (first round)
4. (United States) Ann Li (quarterfinals)
5. (Bulgaria) Viktoriya Tomova (first round)
6. (Czech Republic) Kateřina Siniaková (first round)
7. (Egypt) Mayar Sherif (withdrew)
8. (France) Varvara Gracheva (withdrew)
9. (United States) Katie Volynets (second round)
10. (Spain) Jéssica Bouzas Maneiro (quarterfinals)

== Draw ==
Key

- Q = Qualifier
- WC = Wild card
- LL = Lucky loser
- Alt = Alternate
- ITF = ITF entry
- PR = Protected ranking
- SR = Special ranking
- SE = Special exempt
- JE = Junior exempt
- JR = Junior Accelerator Programme entrant
- CO = College Accelerator Programme entrant
- NG = Next Gen Accelerator Program entrant
- w/o = Walkover
- r = Retired
- d = Defaulted

=== Finals ===
Semifinals
(Australia) Ajla Tomljanović	4	0^{r}
(Australia) Maya Joint	6	0
(Romania) Jaqueline Cristian	6^{6}	6	6
2	(Colombia) Camila Osorio	7^{8}	4	4

Final
(Australia) Maya Joint	6	6
(Romania) Jaqueline Cristian	3	2

=== Top half ===
First round
10	(Spain) J Bouzas Maneiro	6	1	6
(Austria) J Grabher	3	6	4
Q	(Burundi) S Nahimana	6	6
WC	(Morocco) A El Aouni	3	2
Q	(Italy) T Pieri	6	6
(Spain) C Martínez Círez	3	0
(Australia) A Tomljanović	7	4	6
5	(Bulgaria) V Tomova	5	6	3
4	(United States) A Li	7^{8}	6
LL	M Timofeeva	6^{6}	2
(United States) H Baptiste	7^{7}	3	6
Q	(Italy) C Rosatello	6^{5}	6	2
PR	(Croatia) A Konjuh	5	2
(Australia) M Joint	7	6
LL	(Brazil) C Alves	3	0
9	(United States) K Volynets	6	6

Second round
10	(Spain) J Bouzas Maneiro	6	4	6
Q	(Burundi) S Nahimana	4	6	1
Q	(Italy) T Pieri	6	2	4
(Australia) A Tomljanović	4	6	6
4	(United States) A Li	6	6^{5}	7
(United States) H Baptiste	4	7^{7}	5
(Australia) M Joint	6	6
9	(United States) K Volynets	0	3

Quarterfinals
10	(Spain) J Bouzas Maneiro	1	3
(Australia) A Tomljanović	6	6
4	(United States) A Li	2	1
(Australia) M Joint	6	6

Semifinals
(Australia) A Tomljanović	4	0^{r}
(Australia) M Joint	6	0

=== Bottom half ===
First round
6	(Czech Republic) K Siniaková	6	1	2
PR	(Spain) A Bolsova	3	6	6
(Romania) J Cristian	6	6
WC	(Ukraine) Y Kotliar	3	1
WC	(Latvia) A Sevastova	5	6	7
WC	(Morocco) Y Kabbaj	7	4	5
(Turkey) Z Sönmez	6	6
3	(Italy) L Bronzetti	2	1
LL	(Italy) N Fossa Huergo	3	7^{9}	1
(Netherlands) A Rus	6	6^{7}	6
(United States) M Mateas	6	6
Q	(United States) E Mandlik	3	4
K Rakhimova	6	6
(Switzerland) J Teichmann	4	1
(Italy) E Cocciaretto	6	3	2
2	(Colombia) C Osorio	2	6	6

Second round
PR	(Spain) A Bolsova	6^{1}	6^{1}
(Romania) J Cristian	7^{7}	7^{7}
WC	(Latvia) A Sevastova	6	6
(Turkey) Z Sönmez	3	4
(Netherlands) A Rus	4	2
(United States) M Mateas	6	6
K Rakhimova	6	2	3
2	(Colombia) C Osorio	4	6	6

Quarterfinals
(Romania) J Cristian	6	6
WC	(Latvia) A Sevastova	3	4
(United States) M Mateas	3	1
2	(Colombia) C Osorio	6	6

Semifinals
(Romania) J Cristian	6^{6}	6	6
2	(Colombia) C Osorio	7^{8}	4	4

== Qualifying ==
=== Seeds ===
1. (France) Harmony Tan (first round)
2. (Spain) Kaitlin Quevedo (first round)
3. (Canada) Carol Zhao (first round)
4. Maria Timofeeva (qualifying competition, lucky loser)
5. (Burundi) Sada Nahimana (qualified)
6. (Italy) Camilla Rosatello (qualified)
7. (United States) Elizabeth Mandlik (qualified)
8. (Italy) Nicole Fossa Huergo (qualifying competition, lucky loser)

=== Qualifiers ===
1. (Italy) Tatiana Pieri
2. (Italy) Camilla Rosatello
3. (Burundi) Sada Nahimana
4. (United States) Elizabeth Mandlik

=== Lucky losers ===
1. (Brazil) Carolina Alves
2. Maria Timofeeva
3. (Italy) Nicole Fossa Huergo

=== Qualifying draw ===
==== First qualifier ====
First round
1	(France) Harmony Tan	6	4	2
(Italy) Tatiana Pieri	4	6	6
WC	(Morocco) Diae El Jardi	4	2
8	(Italy) Nicole Fossa Huergo	6	6

Qualifying competition
(Italy) Tatiana Pieri	6	6
8	(Italy) Nicole Fossa Huergo	4	1

==== Second qualifier ====
First round
2	(Spain) Kaitlin Quevedo	6	3	1
(Netherlands) Lian Tran	3	6	6
Ekaterina Yashina	1	3
6	(Italy) Camilla Rosatello	6	6

Qualifying competition
(Netherlands) Lian Tran	0	4
6	(Italy) Camilla Rosatello	6	6

==== Third qualifier ====
First round
3	(Canada) Carol Zhao	5	6	3
(Brazil) Carolina Alves	7	3	6
WC	(Hungary) Luca Udvardy	4	1
5	(Burundi) Sada Nahimana	6	6

Qualifying competition
(Brazil) Carolina Alves	6	1	4
5	(Burundi) Sada Nahimana	3	6	6

==== Fourth qualifier ====
First round
4	Maria Timofeeva	7	2	6
(Czech Republic) Tereza Martincová	5	6	4
(United Kingdom) Emily Appleton	4	4
7	(United States) Elizabeth Mandlik	6	6

Qualifying competition
4	Maria Timofeeva	2	4
7	(United States) Elizabeth Mandlik	6	6
