= 2025 National Bank Open – Women's singles =

Tennis tournament in Montreal, Canada

Women's singles
- 2025 National Bank Open

Final
- Champion: (Canada) Victoria Mboko
- Runner-up: (Japan) Naomi Osaka
- Score: 2–6, 6–4, 6–1

Details
- Draw: 96 (16 Q / 8 WC )
- Seeds: 32

Events
Singles	men	women
Doubles	men	women
← 2024 ·	Canadian Open	· 2026 →

Victoria Mboko defeated Naomi Osaka in the final, 2–6, 6–4, 6–1 to win the women's singles tennis title at the 2025 Canadian Open. It was her first WTA Tour title, and she saved a match point en route, in the semifinals against Elena Rybakina. Mboko was the second wildcard in the Open Era to win the tournament, after Monica Seles in 1995, the third Canadian woman to win the tournament (after Faye Urban in 1969 and Bianca Andreescu in 2019), and the third woman to win a WTA 1000 event as their first tour-level title (after Osaka and Andreescu at the 2018 and 2019 Indian Wells Opens). Ranked as the world No. 85, Mboko was the lowest-ranked champion at the Canadian Open and second-lowest ranked woman to win a WTA 1000 title, after No. 133 Kim Clijsters at the 2005 Indian Wells Open.

Jessica Pegula was the two-time defending champion, but lost in the third round to Anastasija Sevastova.

With her wins over Sofia Kenin, Coco Gauff, Rybakina, and Osaka, Mboko was the second-youngest woman in the Open Era to defeat four major champions at the same tournament, after Serena Williams at the 1999 US Open. For the third time overall in the Open Era (after 1977 and 1979), two unseeded women contested the final. This was also the first time since the current WTA 1000 format was established (since 2009) that two players ranked outside the top 40 contested a WTA 1000 final.

This event marked the last professional appearance of former world No. 5 and 2014 Wimbledon finalist Eugenie Bouchard. She lost in the second round to Belinda Bencic.

== Seeds ==
All seeds received a bye into the second round.

1. (United States) Coco Gauff (fourth round)
2. (Poland) Iga Świątek (fourth round)
3. (United States) Jessica Pegula (third round)
4. Mirra Andreeva (third round)
5. (United States) Amanda Anisimova (fourth round)
6. (United States) Madison Keys (quarterfinals)
7. (Italy) Jasmine Paolini (second round)
8. (United States) Emma Navarro (third round)
9. (Kazakhstan) Elena Rybakina (semifinals)
10. (Ukraine) Elina Svitolina (quarterfinals)
11. (Czech Republic) Karolína Muchová (fourth round)
12. Ekaterina Alexandrova (second round)
13. Liudmila Samsonova (second round)
14. Diana Shnaider (second round)
15. (Australia) Daria Kasatkina (third round)
16. (Denmark) Clara Tauson (semifinals)
17. (Switzerland) Belinda Bencic (third round)
18. (Brazil) Beatriz Haddad Maia (second round)
19. (Belgium) Elise Mertens (second round)
20. (Czech Republic) Linda Nosková (second round)
21. (Poland) Magdalena Fręch (second round)
22. (Latvia) Jeļena Ostapenko (third round)
23. (United States) Sofia Kenin (second round)
24. (Ukraine) Marta Kostyuk (quarterfinals, retired)
25. (Poland) Magda Linette (second round)
26. (United States) Ashlyn Krueger (second round)
27. Anastasia Pavlyuchenkova (second round)
28. (United States) McCartney Kessler (fourth round)
29. (Serbia) Olga Danilović (second round)
30. (Ukraine) Dayana Yastremska (fourth round)
31. (Slovakia) Rebecca Šramková (second round)
32. (United States) Peyton Stearns (second round)

Click on the seed number of a player to go to their draw section.

== Draw ==
Key

- Q = Qualifier
- WC = Wild card
- LL = Lucky loser
- Alt = Alternate
- ITF = ITF entry
- PR = Protected ranking
- SR = Special ranking
- SE = Special exempt
- JE = Junior exempt
- JR = Junior Accelerator Programme entrant
- CO = College Accelerator Programme entrant
- NG = Next Gen Accelerator Program entrant
- w/o = Walkover
- r = Retired
- d = Defaulted

=== Finals ===
Quarterfinals
WC	(Canada) Victoria Mboko	6	6
(Spain) Jéssica Bouzas Maneiro	4	2
24	(Ukraine) Marta Kostyuk	1	1^{r}
9	(Kazakhstan) Elena Rybakina	6	2
10	(Ukraine) Elina Svitolina	2	2
(Japan) Naomi Osaka	6	6
6	(United States) Madison Keys	1	4
16	(Denmark) Clara Tauson	6	6

Semifinals
WC	(Canada) Victoria Mboko	1	7	7^{7}
9	(Kazakhstan) Elena Rybakina	6	5	6^{4}
(Japan) Naomi Osaka	6	7^{9}
16	(Denmark) Clara Tauson	2	6^{7}

Final
WC	(Canada) Victoria Mboko	2	6	6
(Japan) Naomi Osaka	6	4	1

=== Top half ===
==== Section 1 ====
First round
(United States) D Collins	6	7
Q	(Bulgaria) V Tomova	3	5
Q	(Spain) C Bucșa	7	2	5
V Kudermetova	5	6	7
(Australia) K Birrell	5	3
WC	(Canada) V Mboko	7	6
(Japan) M Uchijima	2	6^{4}
(Czech Republic) M Bouzková	6	7^{7}

Second round
1	(United States) C Gauff	7	4	7^{7}
(United States) D Collins	5	6	6^{2}
V Kudermetova	6	6
29	(Serbia) O Danilović	4	2
23	(United States) S Kenin	2	3
WC	(Canada) V Mboko	6	6
(Czech Republic) M Bouzková	6	7^{7}
14	D Shnaider	2	6^{5}

Third round
1	(United States) C Gauff	4	7	6
V Kudermetova	6	5	2
WC	(Canada) V Mboko	1	6	6
(Czech Republic) M Bouzková	6	3	0

Fourth round
1	(United States) C Gauff	1	4
WC	(Canada) V Mboko	6	6

==== Section 2 ====
First round
PR	(China) L Zhu	6	7^{7}
Q	(France) V Gracheva	4	6^{3}
(Netherlands) S Lamens	6	4	6
P Kudermetova	3	6	2
Q	(United States) L Chirico	7	5	4
(Spain) J Bouzas Maneiro	5	7	6
Q	(United States) K Volynets	2	6	2
Q	(Japan) A Ito	6	2	6

Second round
12	E Alexandrova	6	2	4
PR	(China) L Zhu	1	6	6
(Netherlands) S Lamens	6	1	6
18	(Brazil) B Haddad Maia	2	6	3
26	(United States) A Krueger	4	4
(Spain) J Bouzas Maneiro	6	6
Q	(Japan) A Ito	2	7	7^{7}
7	(Italy) J Paolini	6	5	6^{5}

Third round
PR	(China) L Zhu	6	6
(Netherlands) S Lamens	2	2
(Spain) J Bouzas Maneiro	4	7	6
Q	(Japan) A Ito	6	5	3

Fourth round
PR	(China) L Zhu	5	6	2
(Spain) J Bouzas Maneiro	7	1	6

==== Section 3 ====
First round
WC	(Canada) B Andreescu	6	6
(Czech Republic) B Krejčíková	3	4
(Australia) M Joint	6	6
(Canada) L Fernandez	4	1
PR	(Czech Republic) M Vondroušová	3	6	6
(Philippines) A Eala	6	1	2
(United States) C Dolehide	4	1
A Blinkova	6	6

Second round
4	M Andreeva	w/o
WC	(Canada) B Andreescu
(Australia) M Joint	6	4	3
28	(United States) M Kessler	4	6	6
24	(Ukraine) M Kostyuk	2	6	6
PR	(Czech Republic) M Vondroušová	6	3	2
A Blinkova	1	4
15	(Australia) D Kasatkina	6	6

Third round
4	M Andreeva	6^{5}	4
28	(United States) M Kessler	7^{7}	6
24	(Ukraine) M Kostyuk	3	6	7^{7}
15	(Australia) D Kasatkina	6	3	6^{4}

Fourth round
28	(United States) M Kessler	7	3	3
24	(Ukraine) M Kostyuk	5	6	6

==== Section 4 ====
First round
Q	(United States) W Osuigwe	5	1
(United States) H Baptiste	7	6
(Romania) J Cristian	2	6	6
WC	(Canada) M Stakusic	6	2	2
Q	(United States) B Pera	3	5
(Colombia) C Osorio	6	7
Q	(France) E Jacquemot	6^{2}	1
WC	(Canada) R Marino	7^{7}	6

Second round
9	(Kazakhstan) E Rybakina	6	6
(United States) H Baptiste	4	3
(Romania) J Cristian	6	6
20	(Czech Republic) L Nosková	3	4
30	(Ukraine) D Yastremska	3	7^{7}	6
(Colombia) C Osorio	6	6^{5}	2
WC	(Canada) R Marino	1	2
8	(United States) E Navarro	6	6

Third round
9	(Kazakhstan) E Rybakina	6	7^{7}
(Romania) J Cristian	0	6^{5}
30	(Ukraine) D Yastremska	7	6
8	(United States) E Navarro	5	4

Fourth round
9	(Kazakhstan) E Rybakina	5	6	7
30	(Ukraine) D Yastremska	7	2	5

=== Bottom half ===
==== Section 5 ====
First round
PR	(Romania) S Cîrstea	3	5
(New Zealand) L Sun	6	7
(Romania) E-G Ruse	2	4
(United Kingdom) E Raducanu	6	6
(United States) A Li	6^{6}	6	3
A Kalinskaya	7^{8}	0	6
Q	K Rakhimova	4	6	6
WC	(Canada) K Cross	6	3	2

Second round
5	(United States) A Anisimova	6	7^{7}
(New Zealand) L Sun	4	6^{5}
(United Kingdom) E Raducanu	6	6
32	(United States) P Stearns	2	4
19	(Belgium) E Mertens	6	6^{4}	2
A Kalinskaya	1	7^{7}	6
Q	K Rakhimova	5	2
10	(Ukraine) E Svitolina	7	6

Third round
5	(United States) A Anisimova	6	6
(United Kingdom) E Raducanu	2	1
A Kalinskaya	1	1
10	(Ukraine) E Svitolina	6	6

Fourth round
5	(United States) A Anisimova	4	1
10	(Ukraine) E Svitolina	6	6

==== Section 6 ====
First round
Q	(Canada) A Arseneault	4	2
(Japan) N Osaka	6	6
(United Kingdom) K Boulter	1	5
(Mexico) R Zarazúa	6	7
(Australia) A Tomljanović	3	6	4
PR	(Latvia) A Sevastova	6	3	6
(Greece) M Sakkari	6	3	7
WC	(Canada) C Branstine	2	6	5

Second round
13	L Samsonova	6	6^{6}	3
(Japan) N Osaka	4	7^{8}	6
(Mexico) R Zarazúa	2	6	2
22	(Latvia) J Ostapenko	6	4	6
25	(Poland) M Linette	3	6	4
PR	(Latvia) A Sevastova	6	4	6
(Greece) M Sakkari	5	4
3	(United States) J Pegula	7	6

Third round
(Japan) N Osaka	6	6
22	(Latvia) J Ostapenko	2	4
PR	(Latvia) A Sevastova	3	6	6
3	(United States) J Pegula	6	4	1

Fourth round
(Japan) N Osaka	6	6
PR	(Latvia) A Sevastova	1	0

==== Section 7 ====
First round
(Germany) T Maria	5	7^{8}	6^{2}
Q	(Germany) L Siegemund	7	6^{6}	7^{7}
(United States) A Parks	4	7	6^{7}
PR	(United States) C McNally	6	5	7^{9}
WC	(Canada) E Bouchard	6	2	6
(Colombia) E Arango	4	6	2
Q	(Croatia) A Ružić	2	7	6
A Potapova	6	5	0

Second round
6	(United States) M Keys	6	6
Q	(Germany) L Siegemund	2	1
PR	(United States) C McNally	6	6
31	(Slovakia) R Šramková	2	2
17	(Switzerland) B Bencic	6	3	6
WC	(Canada) E Bouchard	2	6	4
Q	(Croatia) A Ružić	5	5
11	(Czech Republic) K Muchová	7	7

Third round
6	(United States) M Keys	2	6	6
PR	(United States) C McNally	6	3	3
17	(Switzerland) B Bencic	7^{7}	2	3
11	(Czech Republic) K Muchová	6^{2}	6	6

Fourth round
6	(United States) M Keys	4	6	7
11	(Czech Republic) K Muchová	6	3	5

==== Section 8 ====
First round
WC	(United States) E Mandlik	6	6^{5}	2
(Italy) L Bronzetti	4	7^{7}	6
Q	(China) Y Wang	7^{8}	4	4
(Ukraine) Y Starodubtseva	6^{6}	6	6
(Germany) E Lys	6	6
Q	(France) L Jeanjean	1	4
(Kazakhstan) Y Putintseva	3	3
Q	(China) H Guo	6	6

Second round
16	(Denmark) C Tauson	6	6
(Italy) L Bronzetti	1	2
(Ukraine) Y Starodubtseva	6	6
21	(Poland) M Fręch	1	1
27	A Pavlyuchenkova	3	4
(Germany) E Lys	6	6
Q	(China) H Guo	3	1
2	(Poland) I Świątek	6	6

Third round
16	(Denmark) C Tauson	6	6
(Ukraine) Y Starodubtseva	3	0
(Germany) E Lys	2	2
2	(Poland) I Świątek	6	6

Fourth round
16	(Denmark) C Tauson	7^{7}	6
2	(Poland) I Świątek	6^{1}	3

== Seeded players ==
The following are the seeded players. Seedings are based on WTA rankings as of 21 July 2025. Rankings and points before are as of 28 July 2025.

Because the tournament begins a week earlier this year and has been expanded to take place over twelve days, the points defending column also includes points from the tournament that took place during the week of 29 July 2024 (Washington). Points at the end of the tournament will be postdated to rankings as of 11 August 2025. This method of calculating ranking points for the tournament is different from the ATP's method.

Seed	Rank	Player	Points before	Points defending	Points earned	Points after	Status
1	2	(United States) Coco Gauff	7,669	120	120	7,669	Fourth round lost to (Canada) Victoria Mboko [WC]
2	3	(Poland) Iga Świątek	6,813	0	120	6,933	Fourth round lost to (Denmark) Clara Tauson [16]
3	4	(United States) Jessica Pegula	6,423	1,000	65	5,488	Third round lost to (Latvia) Anastasija Sevastova [PR]
4	5	Mirra Andreeva	4,914	(1)^{†}	35^{§}	4,948	Third round lost to (United States) McCartney Kessler [28]
5	7	(United States) Amanda Anisimova	4,470	650+133	120+27	3,834	Fourth round lost to (Ukraine) Elina Svitolina [10]
6	8	(United States) Madison Keys	4,374	10	215	4,579	Quarterfinals lost to (Denmark) Clara Tauson [16]
7	9	(Italy) Jasmine Paolini	3,576	0	10	3,586	Second round lost to (Japan) Aoi Ito [Q]
8	11	(United States) Emma Navarro	3,420	390	65	3,095	Third round lost to (Ukraine) Dayana Yastremska [30]
9	12	(Kazakhstan) Elena Rybakina	2,893	0	390	3,283	Semifinals lost to (Canada) Victoria Mboko [WC]
10	13	(Ukraine) Elina Svitolina	2,794	65	215	2,944	Quarterfinals lost to (Japan) Naomi Osaka
11	14	(Czech Republic) Karolína Muchová	2,718	0	120	2,838	Fourth round lost to (United States) Madison Keys [6]
12	15	Ekaterina Alexandrova	2,666	0	10	2,676	Second round lost to (China) Zhu Lin [PR]
13	16	Liudmila Samsonova	2,576	215	10	2,371	Second round lost to (Japan) Naomi Osaka
14	17	Diana Shnaider	2,526	390	10	2,146	Second round lost to (Czech Republic) Marie Bouzková
15	18	(Australia) Daria Kasatkina	2,361	10	65	2,416	Third round lost to (Ukraine) Marta Kostyuk [24]
16	19	(Denmark) Clara Tauson	2,346	10	390	2,726	Semifinals lost to (Japan) Naomi Osaka
17	20	(Switzerland) Belinda Bencic	2,190	0	65	2,255	Third round lost to (Czech Republic) Karolína Muchová [11]
18	21	(Brazil) Beatriz Haddad Maia	2,129	65	10	2,074	Second round lost to (Netherlands) Suzan Lamens
19	22	(Belgium) Elise Mertens	2,106	120	10	1,996	Second round lost to Anna Kalinskaya
20	23	(Czech Republic) Linda Nosková	1,932	0	10	1,942	Second round lost to (Romania) Jaqueline Cristian
21	25	(Poland) Magdalena Fręch	1,766	65	10	1,711	Second round lost to (Ukraine) Yuliia Starodubtseva
22	26	(Latvia) Jeļena Ostapenko	1,750	120	65	1,695	Third round lost to (Japan) Naomi Osaka
23	27	(United States) Sofia Kenin	1,708	10	10	1,708	Second round lost to (Canada) Victoria Mboko [WC]
24	28	(Ukraine) Marta Kostyuk	1,616	120	215	1,711	Quarterfinals retired against (Kazakhstan) Elena Rybakina [9]
25	34	(Poland) Magda Linette	1,404	65	10	1,349	Second round lost to (Latvia) Anastasija Sevastova [PR]
26	29	(United States) Ashlyn Krueger	1,544	150	10	1,404	Second round lost to (Spain) Jéssica Bouzas Maneiro
27	30	Anastasia Pavlyuchenkova	1,509	10+60	10+0	1,449	Second round lost to (Germany) Eva Lys
28	32	(United States) McCartney Kessler	1,455	(100)^{‡}	120	1,475	Fourth round lost to (Ukraine) Marta Kostyuk [24]
29	40	(Serbia) Olga Danilović	1,325	(49)^{‡}	10	1,286	Second round lost to Veronika Kudermetova
30	35	(Ukraine) Dayana Yastremska	1,394	10	120	1,504	Fourth round lost to (Kazakhstan) Elena Rybakina [9]
31	36	(Slovakia) Rebecca Šramková	1,387	(30)^{‡}	10	1,367	Second round lost to (United States) Caty McNally [PR]
32	37	(United States) Peyton Stearns	1,386	215+60	10+25	1,146	Second round lost to (United Kingdom) Emma Raducanu

† The player was not required to play in the 2024 tournament due to an age exemption. Points from her 18th best result will be deducted instead.
‡ The player did not qualify for the 2024 tournament. She is defending points from an ITF, a WTA 125 tournament, or her 18th best result instead.
§ The player received second-round points only because she advanced to the third round via a bye and a walkover.

=== Withdrawn seeded players ===
The following players would have been seeded, but withdrew before the tournament began.

Rank	Player	Points before	Points dropping	Points after	Withdrawal reason
1	Aryna Sabalenka	12,420	215+195	12,010	Fatigue
6	(China) Zheng Qinwen	4,553	0	4,553	Elbow injury
10	(Spain) Paula Badosa	3,454	(500)^{†}	2,954	Lower back injury

† The player is only defending her 2024 result from Washington as her result from Toronto was not required to be counted in her ranking as of 28 July 2025.

== Other entry information ==
=== Wildcards ===
- (Canada) Bianca Andreescu
- (Canada) Eugenie Bouchard
- (Canada) Carson Branstine
- (Canada) Kayla Cross
- (United States) Elizabeth Mandlik
- (Canada) Rebecca Marino
- (Canada) Victoria Mboko
- (Canada) Marina Stakusic

=== Protected ranking ===
- (Romania) Sorana Cîrstea
- (United States) Caty McNally
- (Latvia) Anastasija Sevastova
- (Czech Republic) Markéta Vondroušová
- (China) Zhu Lin

=== Withdrawals ===
- ‡ (Spain) Paula Badosa → replaced by (United States) Caty McNally
- ‡ (France) Loïs Boisson → replaced by (Greece) Maria Sakkari
- ‡ (Tunisia) Ons Jabeur → replaced by (Netherlands) Suzan Lamens
- ‡ (United Kingdom) Sonay Kartal → replaced by (Mexico) Renata Zarazúa
- ‡ Aryna Sabalenka → replaced by (Japan) Moyuka Uchijima
- ‡ (Croatia) Donna Vekić → replaced by (Colombia) Emiliana Arango
- ‡ (China) Wang Xinyu → replaced by Anna Blinkova
- ‡ (China) Zheng Qinwen → replaced by (Australia) Kimberly Birrell

‡ – withdrew from entry list
§ – withdrew from main draw

== Qualifying ==
=== Seeds ===
1. (Germany) Laura Siegemund (qualified)
2. Kamilla Rakhimova (qualified)
3. (China) Yuan Yue (withdrew)
4. (Croatia) Antonia Ružić (qualified)
5. (Spain) Cristina Bucșa (qualified)
6. (France) Elsa Jacquemot (qualified)
7. (United States) Taylor Townsend (withdrew, still competing in Washington)
8. (France) Léolia Jeanjean (qualified)
9. (Switzerland) Rebeka Masarova (qualifying competition)
10. (Bulgaria) Viktoriya Tomova (qualified)
11. (Japan) Aoi Ito (qualified)
12. (France) Varvara Gracheva (qualified)
13. (United States) Katie Volynets (qualified)
14. (Australia) Talia Gibson (qualifying competition)
15. (China) Zhang Shuai (withdrew, still competing in Washington)
16. (United States) Bernarda Pera (qualified)

=== Qualifiers ===
1. (Germany) Laura Siegemund
2. Kamilla Rakhimova
3. (United States) Whitney Osuigwe
4. (Croatia) Antonia Ružić
5. (Spain) Cristina Bucșa
6. (France) Elsa Jacquemot
7. (China) Guo Hanyu
8. (France) Léolia Jeanjean
9. (China) Wang Yafan
10. (Bulgaria) Viktoriya Tomova
11. (Japan) Aoi Ito
12. (France) Varvara Gracheva
13. (United States) Katie Volynets
14. (United States) Louisa Chirico
15. (Canada) Ariana Arseneault
16. (United States) Bernarda Pera

=== Qualifying draw ===
==== First qualifier ====
Qualifying competition
1	(Germany) Laura Siegemund	6	1	6
	(Japan) Nao Hibino	1	6	3

==== Second qualifier ====
Qualifying competition
2	Kamilla Rakhimova	7	7
	(Australia) Astra Sharma	5	5

==== Third qualifier ====
Qualifying competition
Alt	(Serbia) Aleksandra Krunić	4	6	1
	(United States) Whitney Osuigwe	6	3	6

==== Fourth qualifier ====
Qualifying competition
4	(Croatia) Antonia Ružić	6	6
WC	(Canada) Dasha Plekhanova	1	2

==== Fifth qualifier ====
Qualifying competition
5	(Spain) Cristina Bucșa	6^{4}	6	6
	(Australia) Priscilla Hon	7^{7}	1	2

==== Sixth qualifier ====
Qualifying competition
6	(France) Elsa Jacquemot	6	3	6
WC	(Canada) Carol Zhao	0	6	4

==== Seventh qualifier ====
Qualifying competition
Alt	(China) Guo Hanyu	6	6
PR	(Romania) Mihaela Buzărnescu	0	0

==== Eighth qualifier ====
Qualifying competition
8	(France) Léolia Jeanjean	6	6
WC	(Canada) Cadence Brace	1	3

==== Ninth qualifier ====
Qualifying competition
9	(Switzerland) Rebeka Masarova	2	6	3
PR	(China) Wang Yafan	6	4	6

==== Tenth qualifier ====
Qualifying competition
10	(Bulgaria) Viktoriya Tomova	6	6
WC	(Canada) Katherine Sebov	1	4

==== Eleventh qualifier ====
Qualifying competition
11	(Japan) Aoi Ito	6	5	6
	Aliaksandra Sasnovich	4	7	0

==== Twelfth qualifier ====
Qualifying competition
12	(France) Varvara Gracheva	6	6
	(Australia) Maddison Inglis	3	2

==== Thirteenth qualifier ====
Qualifying competition
13	(United States) Katie Volynets	6	4	6
	(United Kingdom) Jodie Burrage	0	6	1

==== Fourteenth qualifier ====
Qualifying competition
14	(Australia) Talia Gibson	7^{7}	2	4
	(United States) Louisa Chirico	6^{3}	6	6

==== Fifteenth qualifier ====
Qualifying competition
WC	(Canada) Ariana Arseneault	6	7^{7}
	(Australia) Destanee Aiava	3	6^{5}

==== Sixteenth qualifier ====
Qualifying competition
16	(United States) Bernarda Pera	5	6	6
PR	(United States) Madison Brengle	7	3	4
