= 2025 Mubadala Citi DC Open – Men's doubles =

Men's doubles
- 2025 Mubadala Citi DC Open

Final
- Champions: (Italy) Simone Bolelli (Italy) Andrea Vavassori
- Runners-up: (Monaco) Hugo Nys (France) Édouard Roger-Vasselin
- Score: 6–3, 6–4

Details
- Draw: 16
- Seeds: 4

Events
Singles	men	women
Doubles	men	women
- Washington Open

The first-seeded team of Simone Bolelli and Andrea Vavassori defeated Hugo Nys and Édouard Roger-Vasselin in the final, 6–3, 6–4 to win the men's doubles tennis title at the 2025 Washington Open.

Nathaniel Lammons and Jackson Withrow were the defending champions, but lost in the first round to Alexander Erler and Robert Galloway.

== Seeds ==
1. (Italy) Simone Bolelli / (Italy) Andrea Vavassori (champions)
2. (United States) Christian Harrison / (United States) Evan King (first round)
3. (Monaco) Hugo Nys / (France) Édouard Roger-Vasselin (final)
4. (India) Yuki Bhambri / (New Zealand) Michael Venus (quarterfinals)

== Draw ==
Key

- Q = Qualifier
- WC = Wild card
- LL = Lucky loser
- Alt = Alternate
- ITF = ITF entry
- PR = Protected ranking
- SR = Special ranking
- SE = Special exempt
- JE = Junior exempt
- JR = Junior Accelerator Programme entrant
- CO = College Accelerator Programme entrant
- NG = Next Gen Accelerator Program entrant
- w/o = Walkover
- r = Retired
- d = Defaulted

=== Draw ===
First round
1	(Italy) S Bolelli (Italy) A Vavassori	7	5	[10]
(France) S Doumbia (France) F Reboul	5	7	[7]
(United States) N Lammons (United States) J Withrow	3	6	[7]
Q	(Austria) A Erler (United States) R Galloway	6	3	[10]
4	(India) Y Bhambri (New Zealand) M Venus	6^{1}	7^{7}	[10]
(Sweden) A Göransson (Netherlands) S Verbeek	7^{7}	6^{3}	[6]
(Croatia) N Mektić (United States) R Ram	1	4
(United Kingdom) N Skupski (Australia) J-P Smith	6	6
(United States) B Shelton (United States) F Tiafoe	6^{3}	3
(Australia) M Ebden (Australia) J Peers	7^{7}	6
WC	(Australia) N Kyrgios (France) G Monfils	2	2
3	(Monaco) H Nys (France) É Roger-Vasselin	6	6
WC	(Australia) A de Minaur (Australia) A Popyrin	6	6^{5}	[8]
(Italy) F Cobolli (Spain) A Davidovich Fokina	3	7^{7}	[10]
(Argentina) M González (Argentina) A Molteni	6^{5}	6	[10]
2	(United States) C Harrison (United States) E King	7^{7}	3	[6]

Quarterfinals
1	(Italy) S Bolelli (Italy) A Vavassori	6	6
Q	(Austria) A Erler (United States) R Galloway	4	3
4	(India) Y Bhambri (New Zealand) M Venus	6	4	[7]
(United Kingdom) N Skupski (Australia) J-P Smith	3	6	[10]
(Australia) M Ebden (Australia) J Peers	6	3	[6]
3	(Monaco) H Nys (France) É Roger-Vasselin	4	6	[10]
(Italy) F Cobolli (Spain) A Davidovich Fokina	2	3
(Argentina) M González (Argentina) A Molteni	6	6

Semifinals
1	(Italy) S Bolelli (Italy) A Vavassori	4	6	[10]
(United Kingdom) N Skupski (Australia) J-P Smith	6	3	[4]
3	(Monaco) H Nys (France) É Roger-Vasselin	7^{7}	6
(Argentina) M González (Argentina) A Molteni	6^{5}	4

Final
1	(Italy) S Bolelli (Italy) A Vavassori	6	6
3	(Monaco) H Nys (France) É Roger-Vasselin	3	4

== Qualifying ==
=== Seeds ===
1. (Austria) Alexander Erler / (United States) Robert Galloway (qualified)
2. (France) Benjamin Bonzi / (Brazil) Fernando Romboli (first round)

=== Qualifiers ===
1. (Austria) Alexander Erler / (United States) Robert Galloway

=== Qualifying draw ===
First round
1	(Austria) Alexander Erler (United States) Robert Galloway	3	6	[10]
WC	(United Kingdom) Dan Evans (United Kingdom) Joshua Paris	6	4	[6]
(Spain) Jaume Munar (Italy) Lorenzo Sonego	2	7^{7}	[10]
2	(France) Benjamin Bonzi (Brazil) Fernando Romboli	6	6^{2}	[8]

Qualifying competition
1	(Austria) Alexander Erler (United States) Robert Galloway	6	3	[10]
(Spain) Jaume Munar (Italy) Lorenzo Sonego	1	6	[8]
