= 2025 Mubadala Citi DC Open =

Sports tournament

- Date: July 21–27, 2025
- Edition: 56th (men); 13th (women)
- Category: ATP 500 (men); WTA 500 (women)
- Draw: 48S/16D (men); 28S/16D (women)
- Surface: Hard (outdoor)
- Location: Washington, D.C., U.S.
- Venue: William H.G. FitzGerald Tennis Center

Champions

Men's singles
- (Australia) Alex de Minaur

Women's singles
- (Canada) Leylah Fernandez

Men's doubles
- (Italy) Simone Bolelli / (Italy) Andrea Vavassori

Women's doubles
- (United States) Taylor Townsend / (China) Zhang Shuai
- Washington Open

The 2025 Washington Open (called the Mubadala Citi DC Open for sponsorship reasons) was a tennis tournament played on outdoor hard courts. It was the 56th edition of the Washington Open for the men, and the 13th edition for the women. The event was an ATP 500 tournament on the 2025 ATP Tour and a WTA 500 tournament on the 2025 WTA Tour. The tournament took place at the William H.G. FitzGerald Tennis Center in Washington, D.C. from July 21–27, 2025.

== Champions ==
=== Men's singles ===
- (Australia) Alex de Minaur def. (Spain) Alejandro Davidovich Fokina, 5–7, 6–1, 7–6^{(7–3)}

=== Women's singles ===
- (Canada) Leylah Fernandez def. Anna Kalinskaya, 6–1, 6–2

=== Men's doubles ===
- (Italy) Simone Bolelli / (Italy) Andrea Vavassori def. (Monaco) Hugo Nys / (France) Édouard Roger-Vasselin, 6–3, 6–4

=== Women's doubles ===
- (United States) Taylor Townsend / (China) Zhang Shuai def. (United States) Caroline Dolehide / (United States) Sofia Kenin, 6–1, 6–1

== Point and prize money distribution ==
=== Points distribution ===
Event	W	F	SF	QF	R16	R32	R64	Q	Q2	Q1
Men's singles	500	330	200	100	50	25	0	16	8	0
Men's doubles	500	300	180	90	0	—N/a	—N/a	45	25	0
Women's singles	500	325	195	108	60	32	1	25	13	1
Women's doubles	500	325	195	108	1	—N/a	—N/a	—N/a	—N/a	—N/a

=== Prize money ===
The Mubadala Citi DC Open total prize money for the ATP event is $2,396,115, a 14.09% increase from 2024. The total prize money for the WTA event is significantly smaller at $1,282,951, albeit an increase of 39.06% from 2024.

Event	W	F	SF	QF	R16	R32	R64	Q2	Q1
Men's Singles	$420,525	$224,275	$116,340	$60,740	$32,005	$17,525	$9,345	$4,905	$2,800
Men's Doubles*	$147,190	$78,490	$39,710	$19,860	$10,280	—N/a	—N/a	—N/a	—N/a
Women's Singles	$197,570	$121,880	$71,205	$37,530	$19,085	$13,585	—N/a	$11,220	$6,735
Women's Doubles*	$65,403	$39,780	$23,100	$11,862	$7,210	—N/a	—N/a	—N/a	—N/a

* per team

== ATP singles main draw entrants ==
=== Seeds ===
Country	Player	Rank^{†}	Seed
USA	Taylor Fritz	4	1
ITA	Lorenzo Musetti	7	2
~~DEN~~	~~Holger Rune~~	~~8~~	~~3~~
USA	Ben Shelton	9	4
	Andrey Rublev	10	5
USA	Frances Tiafoe	11	6
AUS	Alex de Minaur	12	7
	Daniil Medvedev	14	8
ITA	Flavio Cobolli	19	9
AUS	Alexei Popyrin	24	10
CZE	Jiří Lehečka	25	11
ESP	Alejandro Davidovich Fokina	26	12
USA	Alex Michelsen	30	13
USA	Brandon Nakashima	31	14
CAN	Gabriel Diallo	38	15
ITA	Lorenzo Sonego	40	16

^{†} Rankings are as of July 14, 2025.

=== Other entrants ===
The following players received wildcards into the singles main draw:

- (United Kingdom) Dan Evans
- (United States) Mackenzie McDonald
- (United States) Emilio Nava
- (United States) Ethan Quinn
- ~~(Denmark) Holger Rune~~

The following player received entry using a protected ranking:

- (United States) Jenson Brooksby

The following players received entry from the qualifying draw:

- (United States) Murphy Cassone
- (United Kingdom) Billy Harris
- (United States) Colton Smith
- (United States) Zachary Svajda
- (China) Wu Yibing
- (Kazakhstan) Beibit Zhukayev

The following player received entry as a lucky loser:

- (France) Corentin Moutet

=== Withdrawals ===
- (United Kingdom) Jacob Fearnley → replaced by (China) Bu Yunchaokete
- (United States) Sebastian Korda → replaced by (Australia) Christopher O'Connell
- (Australia) Nick Kyrgios → replaced by (United States) Aleksandar Kovacevic
- (Czech Republic) Tomáš Macháč → replaced by (United States) Learner Tien
- (Czech Republic) Jakub Menšík → replaced by (France) Benjamin Bonzi
- (United States) Tommy Paul → replaced by (United States) Reilly Opelka
- (Denmark) Holger Rune → replaced by (France) Corentin Moutet
- (Australia) Jordan Thompson → replaced by (Japan) Yoshihito Nishioka

== ATP doubles main draw entrants ==
=== Seeds ===
Country	Player	Country	Player	Rank^{†}	Seed
ITA	Simone Bolelli	ITA	Andrea Vavassori	26	1
USA	Christian Harrison	USA	Evan King	35	2
MON	Hugo Nys	FRA	Édouard Roger-Vasselin	40	3
IND	Yuki Bhambri	NZL	Michael Venus	51	4

^{†} Rankings are as of July 14, 2025.

=== Other entrants ===
The following pairs received wildcard entry into the doubles main draw:

- (Australia) Alex de Minaur / (Australia) Alexei Popyrin
- (Australia) Nick Kyrgios / (France) Gaël Monfils

The following pair received entry from the qualifying draw:

- (Austria) Alexander Erler / (United States) Robert Galloway

=== Withdrawals ===
- (El Salvador) Marcelo Arévalo / (Croatia) Mate Pavić→ replaced by (Sweden) André Göransson / (Netherlands) Sem Verbeek
- (United Kingdom) Julian Cash / (United Kingdom) Lloyd Glasspool → replaced by (Australia) Matthew Ebden / (Australia) John Peers
- (Finland) Harri Heliövaara / (United Kingdom) Henry Patten → replaced by (United States) Nathaniel Lammons / (United States) Jackson Withrow
- (United Kingdom) Joe Salisbury / (United Kingdom) Neal Skupski → replaced by (United Kingdom) Neal Skupski / (Australia) John-Patrick Smith

== WTA singles main draw entrants ==
=== Seeds ===
Country	Player	Rank^{†}	Seed
USA	Jessica Pegula	4	1
USA	Emma Navarro	11	2
KAZ	Elena Rybakina	13	3
DEN	Clara Tauson	19	4
POL	Magdalena Fręch	24	5
USA	Sofia Kenin	26	6
UKR	Marta Kostyuk	27	7
POL	Magda Linette	28	8

^{†} Rankings are as of July 14, 2025.

=== Other entrants ===
The following players received wildcards into the singles main draw:

- (Canada) Victoria Mboko
- (Japan) Naomi Osaka
- (Greece) Maria Sakkari
- (United States) Venus Williams

The following players received entry from the qualifying draw:

- (United States) Caroline Dolehide
- Kamilla Rakhimova
- (Ukraine) Yuliia Starodubtseva
- (United States) Taylor Townsend

=== Withdrawals ===
- Ekaterina Alexandrova → replaced by (United States) Hailey Baptiste
- (United States) Amanda Anisimova → replaced by (Australia) Maya Joint
- (Spain) Paula Badosa → replaced by Anastasia Potapova
- (United States) Ashlyn Krueger → replaced by (Germany) Tatjana Maria
- (China) Zheng Qinwen → replaced by (United States) Danielle Collins

== WTA doubles main draw entrants ==
=== Seeds ===
Country	Player	Country	Player	Rank^{†}	Seed
USA	Asia Muhammad	NZL	Erin Routliffe	15	1
USA	Taylor Townsend	CHN	Zhang Shuai	17	2
TPE	Chan Hao-ching	CHN	Jiang Xinyu	49	3
SVK	Tereza Mihalíková	GBR	Olivia Nicholls	57	4

^{†} Rankings are as of July 14, 2025.

=== Other entrants ===
The following pairs received wildcards into the doubles main draw:

- (United States) Hailey Baptiste / (United States) Venus Williams
- (Canada) Eugenie Bouchard / (United States) Clervie Ngounoue

The following pair received entry using a protected ranking:

- Kamilla Rakhimova / (Kazakhstan) Galina Voskoboeva
