= 2025 Mubadala Citi DC Open – Men's singles =

Men's singles
- 2025 Mubadala Citi DC Open

Final
- Champion: (Australia) Alex de Minaur
- Runner-up: (Spain) Alejandro Davidovich Fokina
- Score: 5–7, 6–1, 7–6^{(7–3)}

Details
- Draw: 48 (6Q / 5WC)
- Seeds: 16

Events
| Singles | men | women |
| Doubles | men | women |
| ← 2024 · | Washington Open | · 2026 → |

Alex de Minaur defeated Alejandro Davidovich Fokina in the final, 5–7, 6–1, 7–6^{(7–3)} to win the men's singles tennis title at the 2025 Washington Open. De Minaur saved three championship points en route to his tenth ATP Tour singles title.

Sebastian Korda was the reigning champion, but withdrew before the tournament.

== Seeds ==
All seeds received a bye into the second round.

1. (United States) Taylor Fritz (quarterfinals)
2. (Italy) Lorenzo Musetti (second round)
3. (Denmark) Holger Rune (withdrew)
4. (United States) Ben Shelton (semifinals)
5. Andrey Rublev (second round)
6. (United States) Frances Tiafoe (quarterfinals)
7. (Australia) Alex de Minaur (champion)
8. Daniil Medvedev (quarterfinals)
9. (Italy) Flavio Cobolli (third round)
10. (Australia) Alexei Popyrin (second round)
11. (Czech Republic) Jiří Lehečka (third round)
12. (Spain) Alejandro Davidovich Fokina (final)
13. (United States) Alex Michelsen (second round)
14. (United States) Brandon Nakashima (quarterfinals)
15. (Canada) Gabriel Diallo (third round)
16. (Italy) Lorenzo Sonego (second round)

Click on the seed number of a player to go to their draw section.

== Draw ==
=== Key ===
- Q = Qualifier
- WC = Wild card
- LL = Lucky loser
- Alt = Alternate
- ITF = ITF entry
- PR = Protected ranking
- SR = Special ranking
- SE = Special exempt
- JE = Junior exempt
- JR = Junior Accelerator Programme entrant
- CO = College Accelerator Programme entrant
- NG = Next Gen Accelerator Program entrant
- w/o = Walkover
- r = Retired
- d = Defaulted

=== Finals ===
Quarterfinals
1 | (United States) Taylor Fritz | 6^{3} | 6 | 5
12 | (Spain) Alejandro Davidovich Fokina | 7^{7} | 3 | 7
4 | (United States) Ben Shelton | 7^{7} | 6
6 | (United States) Frances Tiafoe | 6^{2} | 4
8 | Daniil Medvedev | 6 | 4 | 4
LL | (France) Corentin Moutet | 1 | 6 | 6
7 | (Australia) Alex de Minaur | 6 | 6
14 | (United States) Brandon Nakashima | 4 | 4

Semifinals
12 | (Spain) Alejandro Davidovich Fokina | 6 | 7
4 | (United States) Ben Shelton | 2 | 5
LL | (France) Corentin Moutet | 4 | 3
7 | (Australia) Alex de Minaur | 6 | 6

Final
12 | (Spain) Alejandro Davidovich Fokina | 7 | 1 | 6^{3}
7 | (Australia) Alex de Minaur | 5 | 6 | 7^{7}

=== Top half ===
==== Section 1 ====
First round
(France) G Mpetshi Perricard | 4 | 6 | 3
(Australia) A Vukic | 6 | 3 | 6
(Italy) M Arnaldi | 4 | 6 | 7^{7}
(Germany) D Altmaier | 6 | 2 | 6^{2}
(Spain) J Munar | 7 | 6
(United States) M Giron | 5 | 3
(United States) L Tien | 6 | 6
WC | (United States) E Nava | 1 | 4

Second round
1 | (United States) T Fritz | 6 | 6
(Australia) A Vukic | 3 | 2
(Italy) M Arnaldi | 7 | 7
16 | (Italy) L Sonego | 5 | 5
12 | (Spain) A Davidovich Fokina | 6 | 6
(Spain) J Munar | 4 | 2
(United States) L Tien | 7 | 6
5 | A Rublev | 5 | 2

Third round
1 | (United States) T Fritz | 6 | 6
(Italy) M Arnaldi | 3 | 4
12 | (Spain) A Davidovich Fokina | 6 | 6
(United States) L Tien | 2 | 2

Quarterfinals
1 | (United States) T Fritz | 6^{3} | 6 | 5
12 | (Spain) A Davidovich Fokina | 7^{7} | 3 | 7

==== Section 2 ====
First round
WC | (United States) M McDonald | 6 | 6
Q | (United States) C Smith | 4 | 1
(France) B Bonzi | 5 | 1
(Hungary) F Marozsán | 7 | 6
(Japan) Y Nishioka | 6 | 5 | 6
PR | (United States) J Brooksby | 4 | 7 | 1
(France) Q Halys | 2 | 6 | 3
(United States) A Kovacevic | 6 | 3 | 6

Second round
4 | (United States) B Shelton | 6 | 6
WC | (United States) M McDonald | 3 | 4
(Hungary) F Marozsán | 3 | 4
15 | (Canada) G Diallo | 6 | 6
9 | (Italy) F Cobolli | 6 | 7^{7}
(Japan) Y Nishioka | 2 | 6^{3}
(United States) A Kovacevic | 5 | 6 | 3
6 | (United States) F Tiafoe | 7 | 3 | 6

Third round
4 | (United States) B Shelton | 6 | 6
15 | (Canada) G Diallo | 3 | 2
9 | (Italy) F Cobolli | 1 | 4
6 | (United States) F Tiafoe | 6 | 6

Quarterfinals
4 | (United States) B Shelton | 7^{7} | 6
6 | (United States) F Tiafoe | 6^{2} | 4

=== Bottom half ===
==== Section 3 ====
First round
(United States) R Opelka | 7^{7} | 6^{5} | 6
Q | (United States) M Cassone | 6^{4} | 7^{7} | 3
(France) G Monfils | 3 | 1
Q | (China) Y Wu | 6 | 6
WC | (United Kingdom) D Evans | 3 | 6 | 6
(Belgium) Z Bergs | 6 | 4 | 3
Q | (Kazakhstan) B Zhukayev | 4 | 4
(France) A Müller | 6 | 6

Second round
8 | D Medvedev | 3 | 7 | 6
(United States) R Opelka | 6 | 5 | 1
Q | (China) Y Wu | 7 | 5 | 6
10 | (Australia) A Popyrin | 5 | 7 | 3
13 | (United States) A Michelsen | 4 | 4
WC | (United Kingdom) D Evans | 6 | 6
(France) A Müller | 0 | 1
LL | (France) C Moutet | 6 | 6

Third round
8 | D Medvedev | 6 | 6
Q | (China) Y Wu | 3 | 2
WC | (United Kingdom) D Evans | 2 | 6^{4}
LL | (France) C Moutet | 6 | 7^{7}

Quarterfinals
8 | D Medvedev | 6 | 4 | 4
LL | (France) C Moutet | 1 | 6 | 6

==== Section 4 ====
First round
(Belgium) D Goffin | 4 | 5
(China) Y Bu | 6 | 7
Q | (United States) Z Svajda | 1 | 6 | 6
(Serbia) M Kecmanović | 6 | 2 | 2
WC | (United States) E Quinn | 6 | 6
(Australia) C O'Connell | 3 | 2
(United Kingdom) C Norrie | 6 | 7^{7}
Q | (United Kingdom) B Harris | 3 | 6^{4}

Second round
7 | (Australia) A de Minaur | 7^{7} | 6
(China) Y Bu | 6^{5} | 2
Q | (United States) Z Svajda | 4 | 7^{7} | 3
11 | (Czech Republic) J Lehečka | 6 | 6^{5} | 6
14 | (United States) B Nakashima | 6 | 6
WC | (United States) E Quinn | 3 | 4
(United Kingdom) C Norrie | 3 | 6 | 6
2 | (Italy) L Musetti | 6 | 2 | 3

Third round
7 | (Australia) A de Minaur | 7^{7} | 6^{6} | 6
11 | (Czech Republic) J Lehečka | 6^{4} | 7^{8} | 4
14 | (United States) B Nakashima | 7^{7} | 6
(United Kingdom) C Norrie | 6^{3} | 3

Quarterfinals
7 | (Australia) A de Minaur | 6 | 6
14 | (United States) B Nakashima | 4 | 4

== Qualifying ==
=== Seeds ===
1. (France) Corentin Moutet (qualifying competition, lucky loser)
2. (Australia) Rinky Hijikata (qualifying competition, retired)
3. (Australia) Aleksandar Vukic (moved to main draw)
4. (United States) Colton Smith (qualified)
5. (United Kingdom) Billy Harris (qualified)
6. (United States) Zachary Svajda (qualified)
7. (Japan) Taro Daniel (first round)
8. (United States) Mitchell Krueger (first round)
9. (Japan) Yosuke Watanuki (qualifying competition)
10. (Australia) James McCabe (first round)
11. (United States) Murphy Cassone (qualified)
12. (Japan) James Trotter (withdrew)

=== Qualifiers ===
1. (China) Wu Yibing
2. (United States) Murphy Cassone
3. (Kazakhstan) Beibit Zhukayev
4. (United States) Colton Smith
5. (United Kingdom) Billy Harris
6. (United States) Zachary Svajda

=== Lucky loser ===
1. (France) Corentin Moutet

=== Draw ===
==== First qualifier ====
First round
1 | (France) Corentin Moutet | 6 | 6
(Brazil) Karuê Sell | 4 | 2
(China) Wu Yibing | 4 | 6 | 7^{7}
8 | (United States) Mitchell Krueger | 6 | 3 | 6^{3}

Qualifying competition
1 | (France) Corentin Moutet | 6 | 4 | 4
(China) Wu Yibing | 4 | 6 | 6

==== Second qualifier ====
First round
2 | (Australia) Rinky Hijikata | 6 | 7
WC | (United States) Adhithya Ganesan | 3 | 5
PR | (United States) Thai-Son Kwiatkowski | 2 | 4
11 | (United States) Murphy Cassone | 6 | 6

Qualifying competition
2 | (Australia) Rinky Hijikata | 6^{4} | 2^{r}
11 | (United States) Murphy Cassone | 7^{7} | 1

==== Third qualifier ====
First round
Alt | (United States) Alfredo Perez | 5 | 0^{r}
Alt | (Italy) Andrea Vavassori | 7 | 1
(Kazakhstan) Beibit Zhukayev | 6^{3} | 6 | 6
10 | (Australia) James McCabe | 7^{7} | 2 | 2

Qualifying competition
Alt | (Italy) Andrea Vavassori | 5 | 7^{11} | 4
(Kazakhstan) Beibit Zhukayev | 7 | 6^{9} | 6

==== Fourth qualifier ====
First round
4 | (United States) Colton Smith | 6 | 3 | 6
WC | (United States) Andrew Fenty | 3 | 6 | 4
(United States) Tyler Zink | 7^{7} | 6
7 | (Japan) Taro Daniel | 6^{5} | 4

Qualifying competition
4 | (United States) Colton Smith | 4 | 6 | 6
(United States) Tyler Zink | 6 | 4 | 3

==== Fifth qualifier ====
First round
5 | (United Kingdom) Billy Harris | 6 | 7
(Czech Republic) Marek Gengel | 1 | 5
(Australia) Moerani Bouzige | 7 | 6
Alt | (United States) Govind Nanda | 5 | 4

Qualifying competition
5 | (United Kingdom) Billy Harris | 6 | 7^{8}
(Australia) Moerani Bouzige | 4 | 6^{6}

==== Sixth qualifier ====
First round
6 | (United States) Zachary Svajda | 7 | 6
WC | (Australia) Bernard Tomic | 5 | 1
WC | (Puerto Rico) Jake Fellows | 4 | 4
9 | (Japan) Yosuke Watanuki | 6 | 6

Qualifying competition
6 | (United States) Zachary Svajda | 6 | 1 | 7^{7}
9 | (Japan) Yosuke Watanuki | 3 | 6 | 6^{2}
