= 2025 Mubadala Citi DC Open – Women's singles =

Women's singles
- 2025 Mubadala Citi DC Open

Final
- Champion: (Canada) Leylah Fernandez
- Runner-up: Anna Kalinskaya
- Score: 6–1, 6–2
- Date: 27 July 2025

Details
- Draw: 28 (4Q / 4WC)
- Seeds: 8

Events
Singles	men	women
Doubles	men	women
- Washington Open

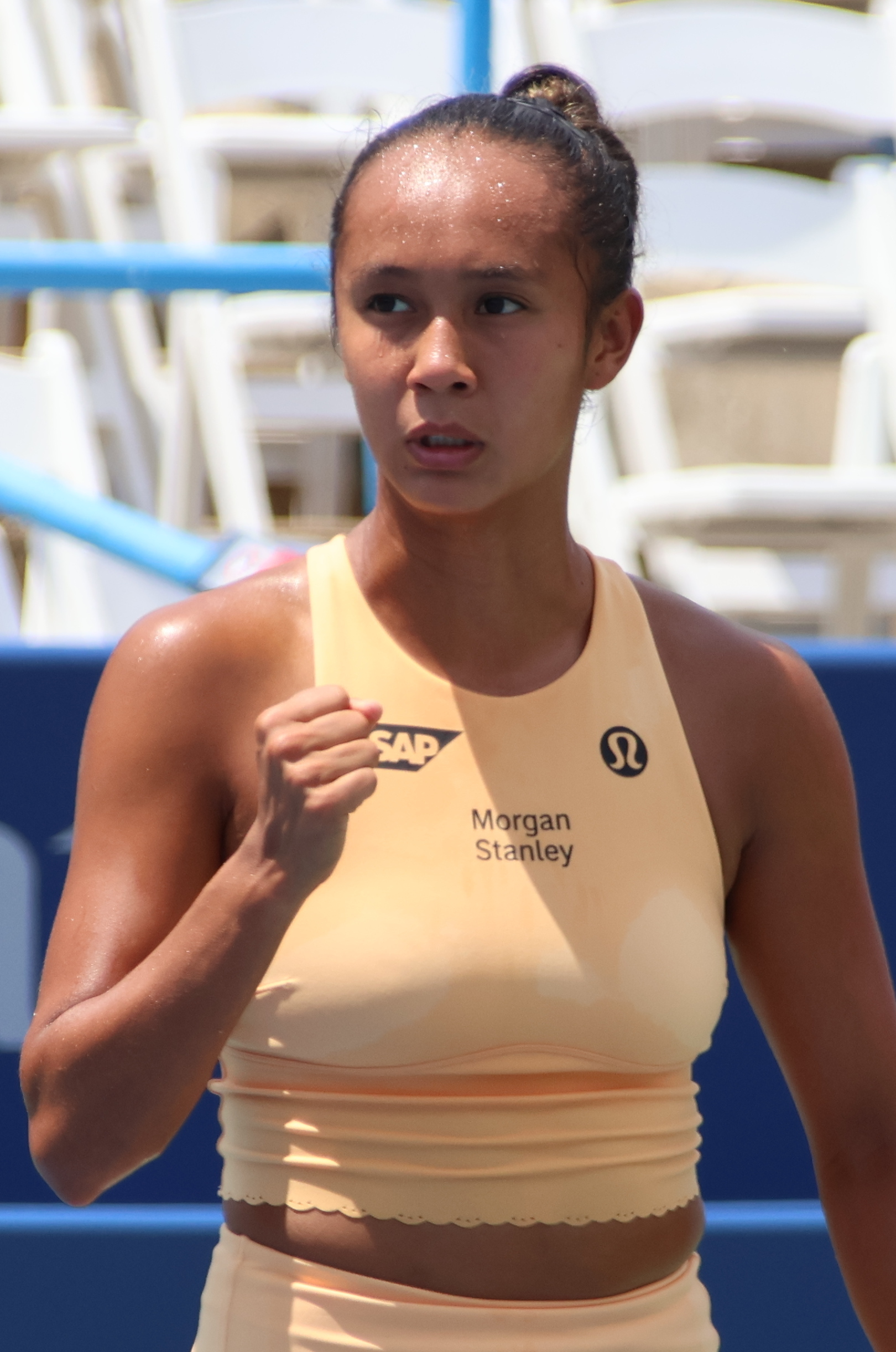
Leylah Fernandez (pictured in the first round) won the title.

Leylah Fernandez defeated Anna Kalinskaya in the final, 6–1, 6–2 to win the women's singles tennis title at the 2025 Washington Open. It was her fourth career WTA Tour title.

Paula Badosa was the reigning champion, but withdrew before the tournament.

With her win over Peyton Stearns in the first round, 45-year-old Venus Williams became the oldest woman to win a WTA Tour-level singles match since Martina Navratilova at the 2004 Wimbledon Championships.

== Seeds ==
The top four seeds received a bye into the second round.

1. (United States) Jessica Pegula (second round)
2. (United States) Emma Navarro (second round)
3. (Kazakhstan) Elena Rybakina (semifinals)
4. (Denmark) Clara Tauson (quarterfinals)
5. (Poland) Magdalena Fręch (quarterfinals)
6. (United States) Sofia Kenin (second round)
7. (Ukraine) Marta Kostyuk (first round)
8. (Poland) Magda Linette (second round)

== Draw ==
Key

- Q = Qualifier
- WC = Wild card
- LL = Lucky loser
- Alt = Alternate
- ITF = ITF entry
- PR = Protected ranking
- SR = Special ranking
- SE = Special exempt
- JE = Junior exempt
- JR = Junior Accelerator Programme entrant
- CO = College Accelerator Programme entrant
- NG = Next Gen Accelerator Program entrant
- w/o = Walkover
- r = Retired
- d = Defaulted

=== Finals ===
Semifinals
(Canada) Leylah Fernandez	6^{2}	7^{7}	7^{7}
3	(Kazakhstan) Elena Rybakina	7^{7}	6^{3}	6^{3}
Anna Kalinskaya	6	6
(United Kingdom) Emma Raducanu	4	3

Final
(Canada) Leylah Fernandez	6	6
Anna Kalinskaya	1	2

=== Top half ===
First round
(Canada) L Fernandez	6	6
(Australia) M Joint	3	3
Q	(United States) T Townsend	6	7
(Germany) T Maria	4	5
(United States) H Baptiste	3	6^{4}
6	(United States) S Kenin	6	7^{7}
A Potapova	2	4
WC	(Canada) V Mboko	6	6
WC	(United States) V Williams	6	6
(United States) P Stearns	3	4
Q	(Ukraine) Y Starodubtseva	2	4
5	(Poland) M Fręch	6	6

Second round
1	(United States) J Pegula	3	6	5
(Canada) L Fernandez	6	1	7
Q	(United States) T Townsend	6	6
6	(United States) S Kenin	3	0
3	(Kazakhstan) E Rybakina	6	7
WC	(Canada) V Mboko	3	5
WC	(United States) V Williams	2	2
5	(Poland) M Fręch	6	6

Quarterfinals
(Canada) L Fernandez	6	7^{7}
Q	(United States) T Townsend	4	6^{4}
3	(Kazakhstan) E Rybakina	6	6
5	(Poland) M Fręch	3	3

Semifinals
(Canada) L Fernandez	6^{2}	7^{7}	7^{7}
3	(Kazakhstan) E Rybakina	7^{7}	6^{3}	6^{3}

=== Bottom half ===
First round
8	(Poland) M Linette	7	6
(United States) D Collins	5	4
A Kalinskaya	6	6
Q	K Rakhimova	2	3
(United States) M Kessler	6^{3}	7	3
Q	(United States) C Dolehide	7^{7}	5	6
7	(Ukraine) M Kostyuk	6^{4}	4
(United Kingdom) E Raducanu	7^{7}	6
WC	(Japan) N Osaka	6	7
(Kazakhstan) Y Putintseva	2	5
WC	(Greece) M Sakkari	6	6
(United Kingdom) K Boulter	3	4

Second round
8	(Poland) M Linette	4	0
A Kalinskaya	6	6
Q	(United States) C Dolehide	6	5	4
4	(Denmark) C Tauson	3	7	6
(United Kingdom) E Raducanu	6	6
WC	(Japan) N Osaka	4	2
WC	(Greece) M Sakkari	7	7^{7}
2	(United States) E Navarro	5	6^{1}

Quarterfinals
A Kalinskaya	6	7
4	(Denmark) C Tauson	3	5
(United Kingdom) E Raducanu	6	7
WC	(Greece) M Sakkari	4	5

Semifinals
A Kalinskaya	6	6
(United Kingdom) E Raducanu	4	3

== Qualifying ==
=== Seeds ===
1. (United States) Caroline Dolehide (qualified)
2. Polina Kudermetova (first round)
3. (Colombia) Camila Osorio (first round)
4. Kamilla Rakhimova (qualified)
5. (Ukraine) Yuliia Starodubtseva (qualified)
6. (Australia) Kimberly Birrell (first round)
7. Anna Blinkova (first round)
8. (Colombia) Emiliana Arango (qualifying competition)

=== Qualifiers ===
1. (United States) Caroline Dolehide
2. (Ukraine) Yuliia Starodubtseva
3. (United States) Taylor Townsend
4. Kamilla Rakhimova

=== Qualifying draw ===
==== First qualifier ====
First round
1	(United States) Caroline Dolehide	6	7^{7}
(Spain) Cristina Bucșa	3	6^{5}
Aliaksandra Sasnovich	6	7
7	Anna Blinkova	3	5

Qualifying competition
1	(United States) Caroline Dolehide	6	4	6
Aliaksandra Sasnovich	2	6	3

==== Second qualifier ====
First round
2	Polina Kudermetova	6	4	3
WC	(United States) Alana Smith	4	6	6
(Canada) Rebecca Marino	4	5
5	(Ukraine) Yuliia Starodubtseva	6	7

Qualifying competition
WC	(United States) Alana Smith	2	0
5	(Ukraine) Yuliia Starodubtseva	6	6

==== Third qualifier ====
First round
3	(Colombia) Camila Osorio	4	6	0
(United States) Taylor Townsend	6	2	6
Anastasia Zakharova	2	2
8	(Colombia) Emiliana Arango	6	6

Qualifying competition
(United States) Taylor Townsend	6	6
8	(Colombia) Emiliana Arango	4	2

==== Fourth qualifier ====
First round
4	Kamilla Rakhimova	6	6
(United States) Varvara Lepchenko	1	4
WC	(United States) Clervie Ngounoue	0	6	6
6	(Australia) Kimberly Birrell	6	4	3

Qualifying competition
4	Kamilla Rakhimova	7^{9}	6
WC	(United States) Clervie Ngounoue	6^{7}	2
