= Maria Sakkari =

Greek tennis player (born 1995)

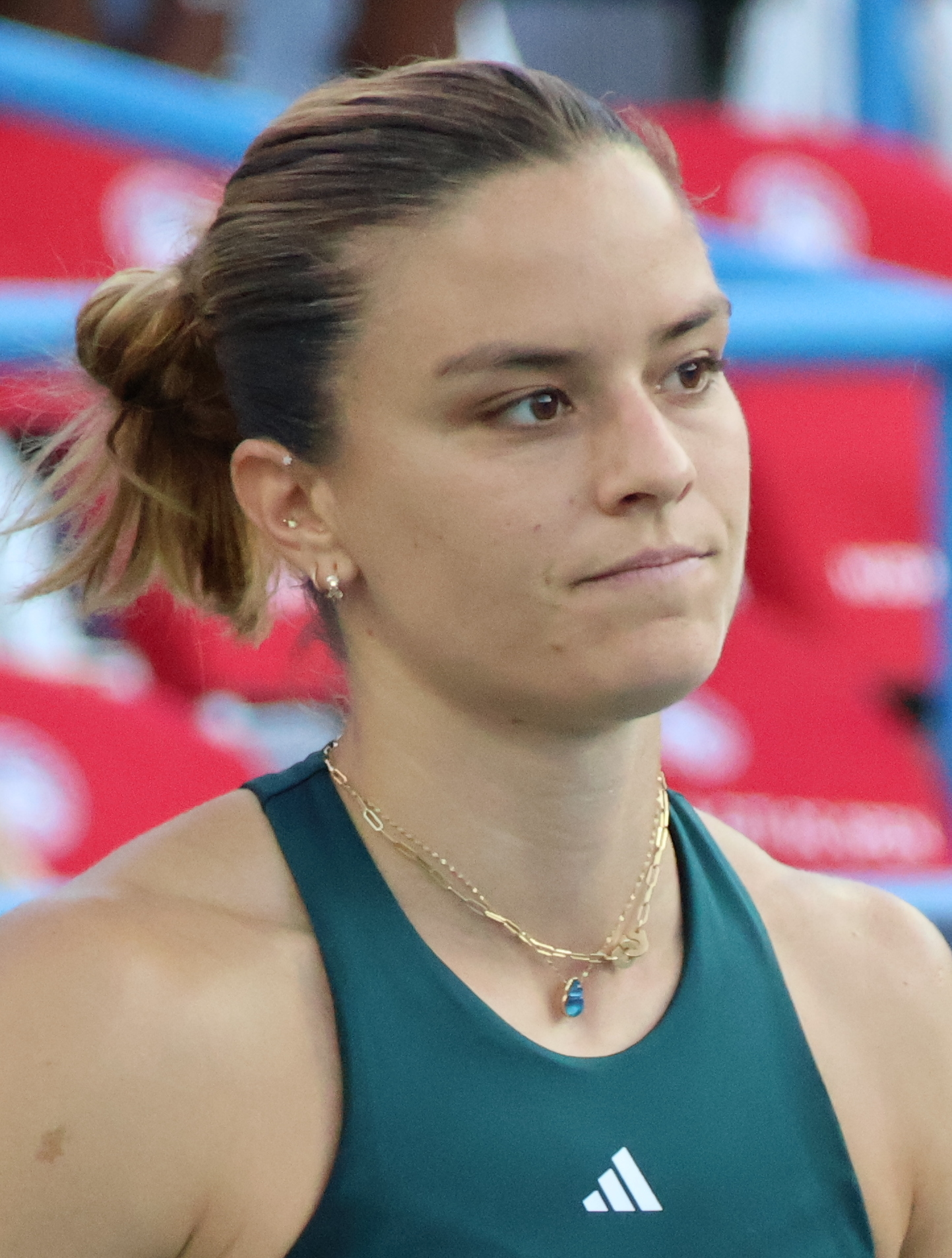
- Sakkari at the 2025 Washington Open
- Native name: Μαρία Σάκκαρη
- Country (sports): Greece
- Born: 25 July 1995 (age 31) Athens, Greece
- Height: 1.72 m (5 ft 8 in)
- Turned pro: 2015
- Plays: Right-handed (two-handed backhand)
- Coach: Thomas Johansson (2017–2018), Tom Hill (2018–2024, 2025–), Mark Philippoussis (2023); David Witt (2024)
- Prize money: US$ 15,384,899

Singles
- Career record: 517–354
- Career titles: 2
- Highest ranking: No. 3 (21 March 2022)
- Current ranking: No. 30 (2 November 2026)

Grand Slam singles results
- Australian Open: 4R (2020, 2022)
- French Open: SF (2021)
- Wimbledon: 3R (2017, 2019, 2022, 2024, 2026)
- US Open: SF (2021)

Other tournaments
- Tour Finals: SF (2021, 2022)
- Olympic Games: 3R (2021, 2024)

Doubles
- Career record: 53–54
- Career titles: 0 WTA, 5 ITF
- Highest ranking: No. 169 (9 September 2019)
- Current ranking: No. 1,558 (2 November 2026)

Grand Slam doubles results
- Australian Open: 1R (2019, 2020)
- French Open: 1R (2019)
- Wimbledon: 2R (2019)
- US Open: 2R (2019)

Other doubles tournaments
- Olympic Games: 1R (2024)

Other mixed doubles tournaments
- Olympic Games: QF (2021)

Team competitions
- Fed Cup: 20–19
- Hopman Cup: RR (2019)
- Last updated on: 2 November 2026.

Maria Sakkari (Greek: Μαρία Σάκκαρη, pronounced [maˈri.a ˈsakari]; born 25 July 1995) is a Greek professional tennis player. She has been ranked as high as No. 3 by the WTA, which she first achieved on 21 March 2022, making her the highest-ranked Greek women's tennis player. Her career-best doubles ranking is world No. 169, achieved on 9 September 2019.

Sakkari has won two singles titles on the WTA Tour, including a WTA 1000 title at the 2023 Guadalajara Open. She is known for her aggressive, all-court style of play, centered around her strong serve and powerful groundstrokes. She served the sixth most aces of any WTA Tour player in 2020, with 144 aces served in 31 matches.

Sakkari reached the semifinals at the 2017 Wuhan Open, where she defeated Caroline Wozniacki for her first top-10 win. In 2019, she reached another Premier 5 semifinal at the Italian Open where she defeated, among other players, Petra Kvitová. In 2020, Sakkari reached the fourth round at both the Australian and US Opens. In 2021, she reached the semifinals at the French and US Opens, making her the first Greek woman to reach a major semifinal.

She was named the Greek Female Athlete of the Year for the years 2020 and 2021.

== Early and personal life ==
Maria Sakkari was born on 25 July 1995 to mother Angelikí Kanellopoúlou, a former top-50 tennis player, and father Konstantinos Sakkaris, in Athens. She has two siblings: brother Yannis and sister Amanda. Her grandfather Dimitris Kanellopoulos was also a professional tennis player. She was introduced to tennis by her parents at age 6 and moved to Barcelona at age 18 in order to train. She has said that her favorite surfaces are hard and clay and that her favorite shot is the serve. Growing up, her favourite players were Serena Williams, Roger Federer and Rafael Nadal. Sakkari currently resides in Monte Carlo. She is engaged to Konstantinos Mitsotakis, the son of the prime minister of Greece Kyriakos Mitsotakis.

Sakkari appears in the Netflix tennis docuseries Break Point.

== Professional ==
=== 2015–16: WTA Tour & major debuts, top 100 ===
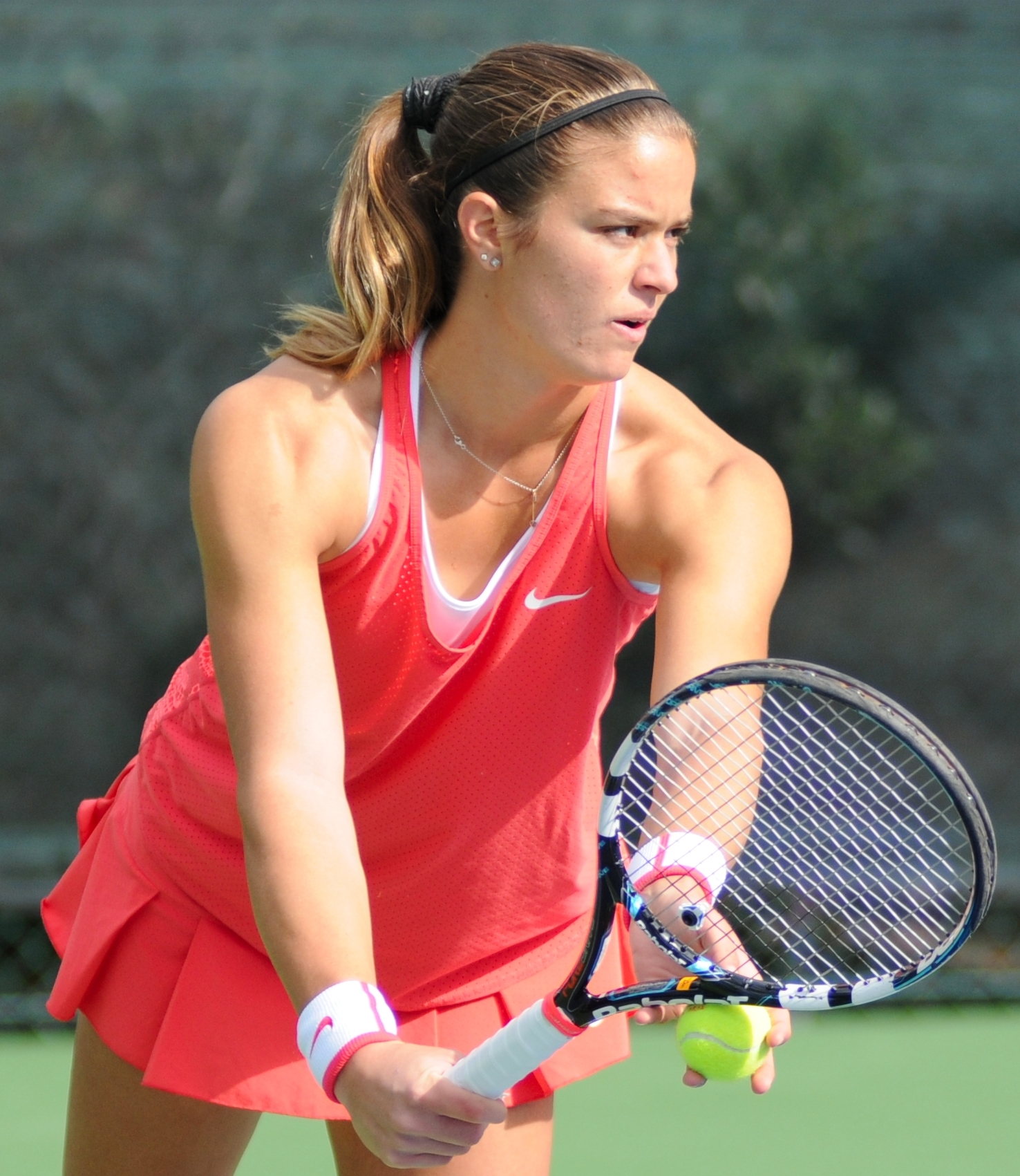
Sakkari in 2015

Her first two attempts to debut on the WTA Tour were unsuccessful. At the Rio Open, she lost in the first round of qualifying to María Irigoyen, (Note: To obtain data from this reference, select the corresponding year on the WTA or ITF website.) and later lost in the final stage of qualifying at Bucharest Open to Daria Kasatkina. However, on her third attempt, she not only made her debut on WTA Tour, but it was at a major, as she qualified for the US Open. In the qualifying, she beat Anastasija Sevastova, An-Sophie Mestach and Petra Martić, but then lost in the first round of the main draw to Wang Qiang. After the US Open, Sakkari entered the top 200 for the first time, reaching a ranking of 185. By the end of the year, she only played on the ITF Circuit and on the WTA Challenger Tour, where she reached semifinals at the Carlsbad Classic. Sakkari ended the year ranked 188.

Sakkari started the 2016 season with no-passing qualification at Brisbane International and Hobart International. At the Australian Open, she first qualified, and then, in the first round of main draw, achieved a win against Wang Yafan. That win was her first at the WTA Tour, as well as her first Grand Slam match win. In the second round, she lost to Carla Suárez Navarro. At the Mexican Open in Acapulco, she was eliminated in the first round by Johanna Larsson. At the Indian Wells Open, she attempted to qualify for her first Premier Mandatory/Premier 5 tournament in the main draw, but failed in the first round of qualification. In Miami, she succeeded to qualify, but lost in the first round of the main draw to Irina-Camelia Begu.

Her second win on the WTA Tour was at the Istanbul Cup, where she defeated top seed Anna Karolína Schmiedlová. After beating Hsieh Su-wei in the second round, she reached her first WTA Tour quarterfinal, where she lost to Danka Kovinić. In Madrid, she failed to reach the main draw, losing to Patricia Maria Țig in the final stage of qualifying. Competing the qualifying at the 2016 French Open, she missed the chance to play in the main draw, losing her first match to Grace Min.

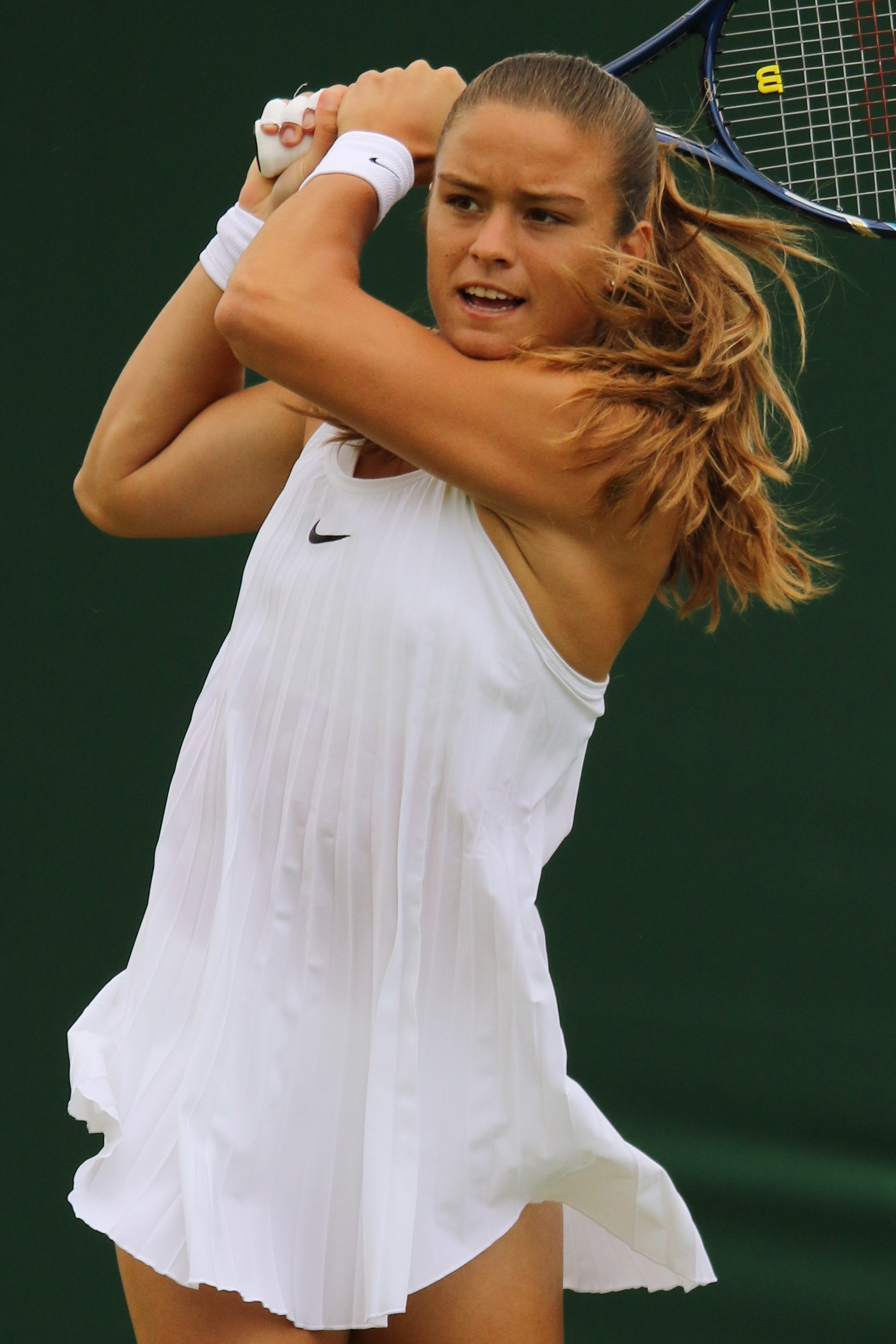
Sakkari at the 2016 Wimbledon Championships

Sakkari got through qualifying for Wimbledon and won her first match at that tournament, defeating Zheng Saisai, but then lost in the second round to five-time former Wimbledon champion, Venus Williams. After this result, on July 11, 2016, she reached 97 in the rankings.

In Cincinnati, she lost in the qualifying to Zheng. At the US Open, she only reached the first round, where Duan Yingying defeated her, but it was her first major appearance in the main draw without need to play in qualifying. At the China Open, she lost in the final stage of qualifying to Wang Yafan.

=== 2017: First Premier 5 semifinal and top 10 win, top 50 debut ===
In 2017, she reached the third round of a Grand Slam tournament for the first time at the Australian Open, where she lost in the third round to Mirjana Lučić-Baroni. In both Indian Wells and Miami, she failed in qualifying. She started the clay-court season at Charleston Open, where she got to the second round, where she lost to Jeļena Ostapenko. In Madrid and Rome, Sakkari lost in the qualifying. At the French Open, she debuted in the main draw, where she lost in the first round to Carla Suárez Navarro.

Grass-court season went better for Sakkari, reaching the quarterfinals at Nottingham Open and her first third round at Wimbledon, where Johanna Konta stopped her from going into round of 16.

At the US Open, she reached the same stage as she did at the Australian Open and Wimbledon, making the third round for the third time. In the first two rounds, she defeated Kiki Bertens and Arina Rodionova, but was eliminated by Venus Williams in the third round. She reached her first WTA Tour semifinal at the Wuhan Open by beating Caroline Wozniacki, Elena Vesnina and Alizé Cornet, but then missed her chance to reach her first WTA final, losing to Caroline Garcia. This success propelled her into the top 50 of the WTA rankings, reaching No. 50, on 2 October 2017. Her last tournament of the season was the Tianjin Open, where Christina McHale eliminated her in the second round.

=== 2018: First WTA Tour final and top 30 ===
Sakkari started 2018 season with four first-round losses, against Danka Kovinić in the Shenzhen Open, Kateřina Siniaková at the Australian Open, Julia Görges in the St. Petersburg, and Sorana Cîrstea in the Doha. In Dubai, she reached the final stage of qualification, but did not make it to the main draw, losing to Samantha Stosur. In Acapulco, she recorded her first win of the 2018 season, defeating Lara Arruabarrena in the first round, but lost against Stefanie Vögele in the second. At Indian Wells, Sakkari managed to beat Donna Vekić, 16th seed Ashleigh Barty and 17th seed CoCo Vandeweghe, respectively. She lost in the fourth round to the eventual champion, Naomi Osaka. At the Miami Open, she defeated Aleksandra Krunić and 28th seed Anett Kontaveit, and reached the third round where she lost to Monica Puig.

Sakkari started her clay-court season by reaching her first semifinal in 2018 in (Istanbul) where she beat Çağla Büyükakçay, Aleksandra Krunić and Arantxa Rus, respectively, before losing to Polona Hercog. She then lost in the first round of the Madrid Open to Kiki Bertens. Her next tournament was the Italian Open, where she avenged her Madrid exit by beating Bertens in the first round, and then had her second win against a top-ten player by beating Karolína Plíšková. She lost in the third round to Angelique Kerber. At the French Open, she reached the third round, after defeating Mandy Minella and Carla Suárez Navarro and then she completed third rounds at all Grand Slam tournaments. In the third round, she lost to 14th seed Daria Kasatkina.

Sakkari lost all of her matches of the grass-court season. She was defeated by Julia Görges at the Birmingham Classic, Svetlana Kuznetsova at the Eastbourne International, and by Sofia Kenin at Wimbledon.

The U.S. hardcourt series started well for Sakkari, reaching her first Tour final at the San Jose Classic, where she beat Christina McHale, Tímea Babos, third seed Venus Williams, and Danielle Collins before she lost to Mihaela Buzărnescu in the final. On 6 August, she reached a new career-high ranking of No. 31. After that result, she was not successful in the rest of the US Series, reaching only first rounds at the Rogers Cup and Connecticut Open where she lost to Daria Kasatkina and Zarina Diyas, respectively, as well as only second rounds at the Cincinnati Open and US Open. At Cincinnati, she beat Naomi Osaka in the first round and avenged her loss in Indian Wells earlier that year. However, in the second round, Anett Kontaveit knocked her out of the tournament. When the US Open started, she debuted in the top 30. At the US Open, she was seeded for the first time at any Grand Slam championship (No. 32), and she had to play against two Americans in the first two rounds, winning against Asia Muhammad, but then lost to Sofia Kenin.

At the Korea Open, Sakkari made another WTA semifinal, defeating Anna Karolína Schmiedlová, Margarita Gasparyan and Irina-Camelia Begu, respectively, in first three rounds, before she was defeated by Kiki Bertens in the semifinal. At both the Wuhan Open and China Open, Sakkari failed in the first rounds, losing to Wang Qiang and Donna Vekić, respectively. In her last two tournaments in 2018, Tianjin Open and Luxembourg Open, Sakkari failed in the first round. She finished the year inside the top 50, reaching No. 41.

=== 2019: Maiden career title, Rome semifinalist, five top 10 wins ===
Sakkari started year with a first-round loss at Hobart, where she was defeated by Magda Linette. Sakkari reached the third round at the Australian Open, defeating Jeļena Ostapenko and Astra Sharma, before she was eliminated by Ashleigh Barty. At next three tournaments, Sakkari was eliminated in the first rounds: at St. Petersburg by Julia Görges, at the Mexican Open by Monica Puig, and at Indian Wells by Christina McHale. At the Miami Open, she defeated Olga Danilović in the first round, but lost to No. 3, Petra Kvitová, in the second.

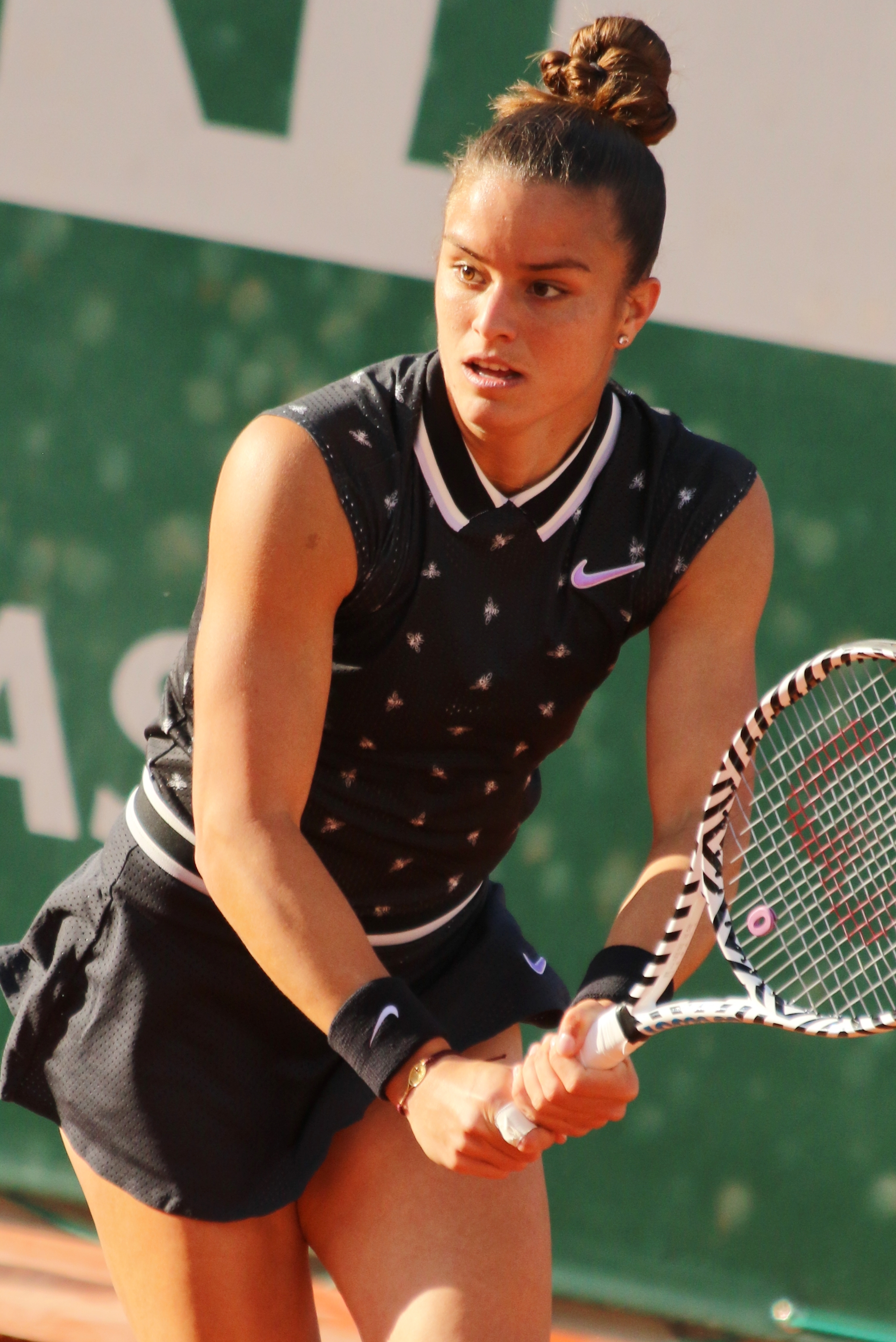
Sakkari at the 2019 French Open

As it regards the clay-court season, she started playing at Charleston Open, where she defeated Conny Perrin, Andrea Petkovic and second seed Kiki Bertens, respectively. Then she reached quarterfinal where she was defeated by fifth seed Caroline Wozniacki. At İstanbul Cup, she failed in first round from Veronika Kudermetova. The Morocco Open was special for Sakkari, because until 23 September 2023 when she won the Guadalajara title, it had been her only tournament where she had succeeded to win a title. On her road to the final, she defeated Olga Danilović, Isabella Shinikova, Elise Mertens, Alison Van Uytvanck, and then, in the final, she defeated Johanna Konta. After winning the title, she climbed from 51 to place 39 in the WTA rankings. While in Madrid she did not have much success, reaching only first round, in Rome she firstly passed qualification and then she reached her second career-Premier-5 semifinal, but there lost to the eventual champion Karolína Plíšková. At the French Open, she was seeded for the first time there at No. 29, and she reached second round, winning against Anna Tatishvili in first round, but lost in second round to Kateřina Siniaková.

On grass court, first she got to the quarterfinal of the Nottingham Open where she lost to Jennifer Brady. Then at the Birmingham Classic, she was eliminated in the first round by Naomi Osaka. In Eastbourne, she beat Jessica Pegula, but Johanna Konta stopped her from going further than round one. At Wimbledon, she reached her second third round there, beating Bernarda Pera and Marie Bouzková, but then lost to Elina Svitolina in the third round.

In San Jose, she played her second semifinal there, winning against top-seeded Elina Svitolina in the quarterfinal, but this time she did not make it to the final, losing in her semifinal match to Zheng Saisai. At Rogers Cup, she lost to Alison Riske in the first round. In Cincinnati, she reached a new Premier-5 quarterfinal, before she lost to world No. 1, Ashleigh Barty, in three sets. At the US Open, she lost in third round, again to Barty.

Back in Europe, she only played one tournament. She played at Kremlin Cup, where in first round, Anastasia Pavlyuchenkova beat her in three sets. For the first time in Sakkari's career, she qualified for some year-end championships. At WTA Elite Trophy, she lost both matches in her group, to Elise Mertens and Aryna Sabalenka.

=== 2020: Solid results, top 20 debut, win over Serena Williams ===
Sakkari was successful at the first Grand Slam tournament of year, the Australian Open, where she reached her first Grand Slam round of 16. Victories over Margarita Gasparyan (first round), Nao Hibino (second) and No. 11 Madison Keys (third) propelled her to the round of 16, where she was defeated by Petra Kvitová in three sets. At her next tournament, she continued this success. She played at the St. Petersburg Trophy, where she reached her new Premier semifinal. She won against Vitalia Diatchenko and Alizé Cornet in first two-rounds, and then in the quarterfinal, she made her new top-10 win, defeating No. 5 Belinda Bencic, before new rising star, Elena Rybakina, stopped her from reaching the final. In Dubai, she did not do well, losing in the first round to seventh seed Aryna Sabalenka. In Doha, she did much better, winning against Julia Görges and Tereza Martincová in first two rounds, but again, Aryna Sabalenka was too strong for her. After the comeback of the WTA Tour, after COVID-19 pandemic outbreak, Sakkari first played at Palermo International, where she was eliminated in first round from Kristýna Plíšková. At the Cincinnati Open, Sakkari made another quarterfinal. In round one, she defeated young American player Coco Gauff, in second round Yulia Putintseva, and then in third round, she had one of her biggest career wins, defeating Serena Williams in three sets. However, in the quarterfinal, she lost to Johanna Konta. At the US Open, she continued her great performance, reaching round of 16 for the first time there. She defeated Stefanie Vögele, Bernarda Pera and Amanda Anisimova, before Serena Williams stopped her from reaching her first Grand Slam quarterfinal. At the French Open, as the No. 20 seed, Sakkari reached her second third round; against qualifier Martina Trevisan, she had match points but missed the chance to reach the round of 16.

=== 2021: First two major semifinals, WTA Finals, top 10 debut ===
Sakkari started off the season strongly making the quarterfinals of the Abu Dhabi Open without dropping a set with wins over Anastasia Potapova, Coco Gauff and Garbiñe Muguruza. She then came from a set down to upset top seed Sofia Kenin before losing to eventual champion Aryna Sabalenka in straight sets. She then backed this up with a semifinal appearance at the Grampians Trophy before losing to Anett Kontaveit in a three set thriller. However, she was unable to match her previous success at the Australian Open falling in three sets to Kristina Mladenovic. She rebounded with a quarterfinal appearance in Doha losing to eventual champion Muguruza, in straight sets. She crashed out of the Dubai Championships to eventual finalist Barbora Krejčíková in the first round. However she bounced back in Miami. She beat her opening opponents Arantxa Rus and Ludmilla Samsonova in the second and third rounds, respectively, for the loss of six games combined. She then saved six match points in a three-set thriller against surging Jessica Pegula to reach her third WTA 1000 quarterfinal. There she faced Naomi Osaka who had not lost a match in over a year and was on a 23 match-winning streak. Sakkari caused one of the upsets of the tournament in defeating the second seed, in straight sets. With the win, she ended Osaka's chances of reclaiming the world No. 1 ranking and reached the biggest semifinal of her career. She then faced Bianca Andreescu for a place in the final but was herself defeated in a third set tiebreaker.

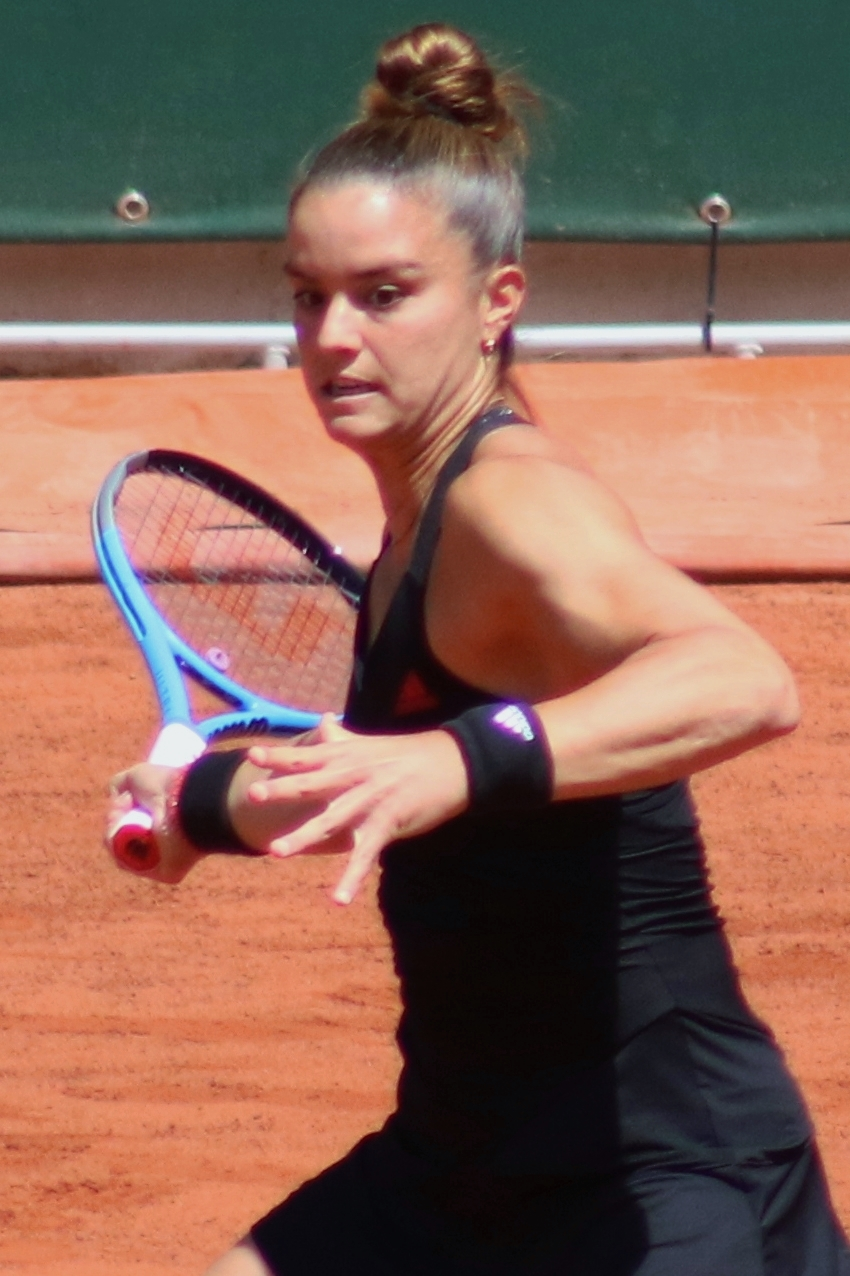
Sakkari at the 2021 French Open

Sakkari made her first ever Grand Slam semifinal at the French Open after beating Katarina Zavatska, Jasmine Paolini, Elise Mertens, Sofia Kenin, and defending champion Iga Świątek, ending the 11-match, 22-set Roland Garros winning streak of the 2020 champion. She became the first woman from Greece to reach a Grand Slam singles quarterfinal and later semifinal. It was also the first time in major history that two Greek players (Sakkari and Tsitsipas) were in the semifinals of a Grand Slam championship. However, Sakkari then lost to Barbora Krejčíková in the semifinals, despite having one match point.

In September 2021, Sakkari beat fourth seed Karolína Plíšková to earn a place in only the second major semifinal of her career at the US Open to play qualifier from Great Britain Emma Raducanu. Sakkari's win against Plíšková was her third straight win over a top 10 seed, after defeating No. 6 seed Bianca Andreescu in a record-setting latest women's match in the round of 16 and tenth seed, Petra Kvitová, in the third round and she is a 4-0 vs top-5 opponents in 2021. She also became the first Greek woman to reach the semifinals of the US Open. She was defeated by Raducanu in straight sets. As a result, she entered the top 15 at world No. 13 on 13 September 2021, displacing Eleni Daniilidou as the highest ranked Greek player.

At the Ostrava Open, she reached the final defeating the top seed, Iga Świątek. She improved to 2–0 against Swiatek after a her win in the French Open quarterfinals at Roland Garros earlier in the year. This was her seventh win against a top-10 player and eleventh against a top-20 player this season. The Greek advanced to her first final since 2019 after losing nine straight WTA semifinals. In the final, she was defeated in threes sets by Anett Kontaveit. As a result of reaching the final, she entered the top 10 in the WTA rankings for the first time in her career on 27 September 2021.

She qualified for the 2021 WTA Finals becoming the first Greek woman to participate in the year-end tournament. She reached the semifinals defeating Aryna Sabalenka in three sets.

=== 2022: Indian Wells final, WTA Finals semifinalist ===
Sakkari reached the fourth round at the Australian Open, where she lost to Jessica Pegula.

Sakkari entered the St. Petersburg Ladies' Trophy as the top seed. She defeated Anastasia Potapova, Ekaterina Alexandrova and Elise Mertens to reach the semifinals. Then she defeated Irina-Camelia Begu to reach her fourth career final, where she lost to Anett Kontaveit in three sets. At the Doha Open, she defeated Ann Li, Jessica Pegula and Cori Gauff, all in straight sets. In the semifinals, Sakkari lost to eventual champion Iga Świątek.

Sakkari entered the Indian Wells Open as the sixth seed. She defeated Kateřina Siniaková, Petra Kvitová, qualifier Daria Saville and Elena Rybakina to reached her first Indian Wells semifinals. Then she beat defending champion Paula Badosa to reach her first WTA 1000 final of her career. But she lost to Iga Świątek in straight sets. With this result, she reached her career-high ranking No. 3. She became the first Greek female player who reached the top 5.

In Miami, Sakkari lost in the second round against Brazilian Beatriz Haddad Maia, in three sets. At the French Open, she lost in the second round to Karolína Muchová in straight sets. At Wimbledon, she lost in the third round to Tatjana Maria in straight sets. Sakkari hit 28 winners, but had 29 unforced errors in the match compared to twelve for Maria. At the Cincinnati Open, Sakkari lost in the second round to Caroline Garcia in a tough three-set match lasting more than two hours.

She reached her sixth career final at the Parma Open where she was defeated by Mayar Sherif, in straight sets. However, this result was followed by opening-round losses in Ostrava and San Diego to Alycia Parks and Donna Vekić, respectively.

Sakkari made it to the finals of the Guadalajara Open defeating Marta Kostyuk, Danielle Collins, Veronika Kudermetova and Marie Bouzková en route. The win against Kudermetova qualified her for the WTA Finals for a second consecutive year. In the final, she was defeated by Jessica Pegula, in straight sets.

Sakkari got revenge for her loss in Guadalajara final by edging out a straight-sets win over Pegula in the opening match of the WTA Finals. She breezed past Aryna Sabalenka and Ons Jabeur in straight sets to finish 3–0 in the round robin stage, as she surged into the semifinals of the WTA Finals for a second straight year. However, Sakkari lost her semifinal match to Caroline Garcia in straight sets.

=== 2023: Guadalajara champion, early round losses, third WTA Finals ===
She started the year with games at the 2023 United Cup where she and the Greece team reached the semifinal, where they were eliminated by the Italian team. Sakkari reached the third round of the Australian Open and was knocked out by world No. 87, Zhu Lin.

In Linz as the top seed, she advanced to the semifinals by beating Nuria Párrizas Díaz, Varvara Gracheva and Donna Vekić but lost to Petra Martić.

Sakkari continued her season in Doha at the Qatar Ladies Open where she was the fifth seed. She defeated Zheng Qinwen in the first round and Ekaterina Alexandrova in the second round to reached the quarterfinals. She reached the semifinals defeating world No. 5 and third seed, Caroline Garcia, in the quarterfinals. She lost to second seed Jessica Pegula in the semifinals. She reached also the semifinals at Indian Wells but lost to second seed Aryna Sabalenka.

At Wimbledon, Sakkari was knocked out by Marta Kostyuk in the first round.

In August, Sakkari reached the final in Washington defeating the top seed Jessica Pegula in the semifinals. In the final, she lost to Coco Gauff in straight sets. At the US Open, she was defeated by No. 71 Rebeka Masarova in the first round. After that unexpected and heavy loss, Sakkari stated that "she may take a break from tennis.

Seeded second at the Guadalajara Open, she reached her third WTA 1000 quarterfinal of the season defeating Camila Giorgi. Next, she defeated WTA 1000 debutante Emiliana Arango to reach the semifinals and again third seed Caroline Garcia to reach consecutive finals at this event. Sakkari defeated Caroline Dolehide in the final to win her second career title, four and a half years after her first, and snap a six-match losing streak in tour-level finals. This marked her first WTA 1000 title, the first ever for a Greek female tennis player.

=== 2024: Indian Wells final, Olympics, shoulder injury, out of top 30 ===
At the beginning of the year, Sakkari participated with Team Greece in the United Cup. There, in her singles matches, she won her three matches: against Angelique Kerber of Team Germany, Leylah Fernandez of Team Canada and Daniela Seguel of Team Chile, all matches in straight sets. Next, at the Australian Open, Sakkari got past Nao Hibino in the first round in straight sets. In the second round, the eighth seed was stunned by Elina Avanesyan, losing the match in straight sets.

Continuing her campaign on hardcourts, now in the Middle East, Sakkari participated in the Abu Dhabi Open, where as the third seed she lost to Sorana Cîrstea in the first round in straight sets. She reached her second final at the WTA 1000 Indian Wells Open, and fourth in her career overall at this level, under the tutelage of her new coach David Witt.

At the Miami Open, she was stopped in the quarterfinals by Elena Rybakina.

At the French Open, Sakkari lost in the first round to Varvara Gracheva. At the Paris Olympics she was eliminated in the round of 16 by Marta Kostyuk. Sakkari retired due to injury after losing the first set of her opening round match against Wang Yafan at the US Open. She then put an end to her season to recover from the shoulder injury.

=== 2025: Linz and Washington quarterfinals, Madrid fourth round ===
Seeded third at the Linz Open, Sakkari received a bye in the first round and then defeated Viktoriya Tomova to reach the quarterfinals, where she lost to fifth seed Dayana Yastremska.

At the Madrid Open, she overcame Wang Xinyu, 29th seed Magda Linette and sixth seed Jasmine Paolini to make it through to the fourth round at which point her run was ended by 17th seed Elina Svitolina. The following week, Sakkari qualified for the Italian Open and progressed through to the second round when her opening opponent, Belinda Bencic, retired injured having lost the first set. Sakkari was defeated by 32nd seed Magda Linette in a second-round match which went to three sets.

Given a wildcard entry into the main-draw at the Washington Open, wins over Katie Boulter and second seed Emma Navarro saw Sakkari make it through to the quarterfinals, at which point her run was ended by Emma Raducanu.

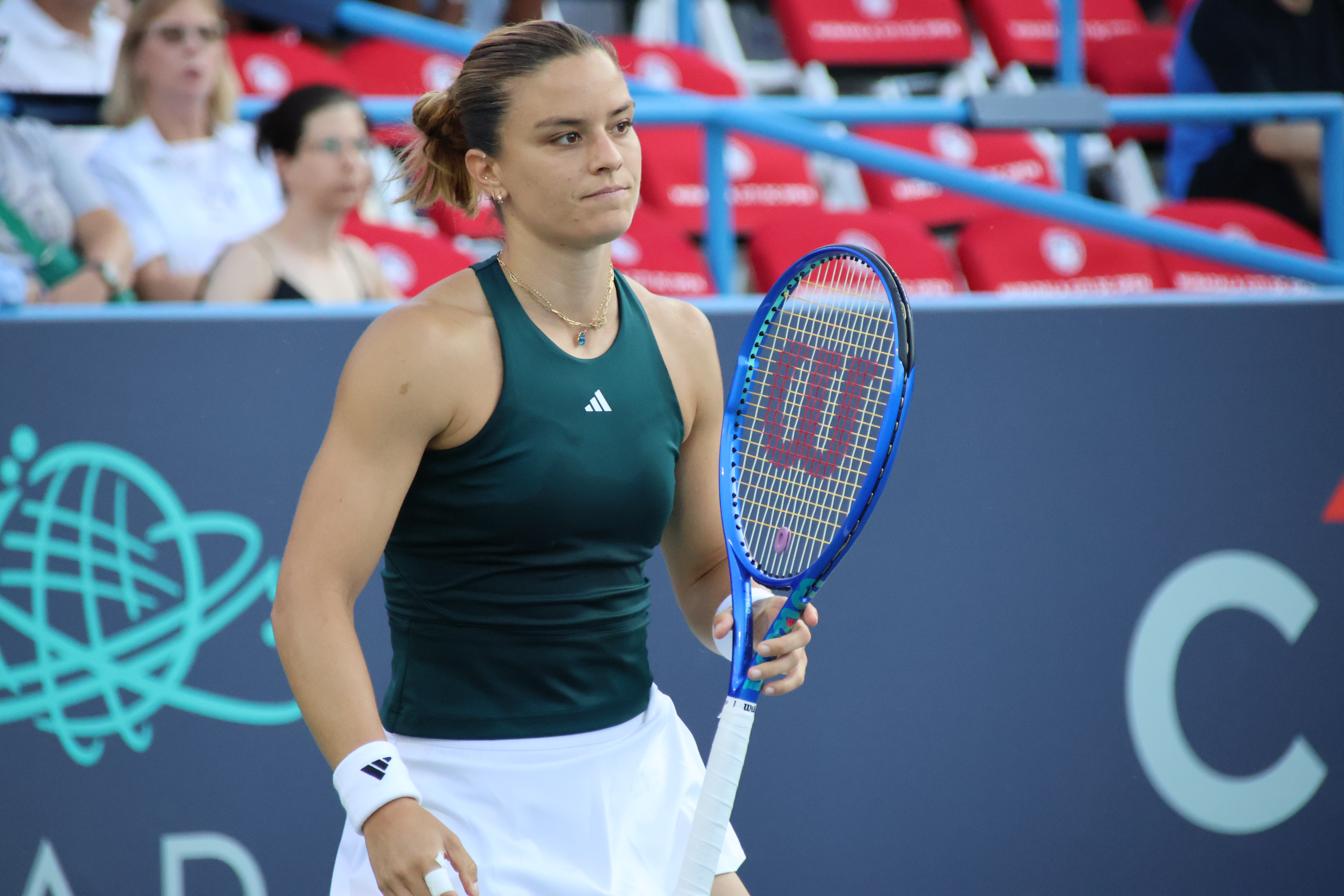
Sakkari at the 2025 DC Open.

=== 2026: Athens final, Qatar semifinal ===
In February at the Qatar Open, Sakkari defeated wildcard entrant Zeynep Sönmez, sixth seed Jasmine Paolini, qualifier Varvara Gracheva and top seed Iga Świątek to reach the semifinals. She lost in the last four to 14th seed Karolína Muchová in three sets.

Seeded fourth at the Athens Open in July, Sakkari recorded wins over Polina Kudermetova, Harriet Dart, Alycia Parks and Alina Korneeva to make it through to her first final since March 2024 and 40 years after her mother, Angeliki Kanellopoulou, achieved the same feat. She lost the championship match to third seed Barbora Krejčíková. In September, Sakkari defeated Linda Fruhvirtová and qualifier Nao Hibino to reach the quarterfinals at the Singapore Open, where she lost to Talia Gibson in three sets.

In October at the Wuhan Open, Sakkari defeated Donna Vekić, eighth seed Marta Kostyuk and wildcard entrant Mia Pohánková to make it into the quarterfinals, at which point her run was ended by 16th seed Maja Chwalińska. Seeded fourth at the Hong Kong Open in November, she recorded wins over lucky loser Carol Young Suh Lee, Maya Joint and qualifier Aliaksandra Sasnovich to reach the semifinals, where she lost to second seed Alexandra Eala in three sets.

== National representation ==
Sakkari made her debut for the Greece Fed Cup team in 2012, and has a Fed Cup win–loss record of 20–19 to date.

== Charity work and philanthropy ==
Sakkari is the first ambassador of the charity association DESMOS, which since 2012 uplifts vulnerable social groups, through many actions and programs, which are shared in collaboration with more than 800 organizations. She has been part of DESMOS since 2019. "I am a big believer in the value of giving and civic engagement, because they have the power to create waves of positive change for all of us. For this reason, with great joy, I accepted the proposal of Desmos to offer in my own way, as the first Ambassador", she stated.

On 10 August 2022, Sakkari has been announced as the part of line up for "Tennis Plays for Peace" exhibition, which took place on August 24 with other numerous current and former tennis stars like Rafael Nadal, Carlos Alcaraz, Coco Gauff, John McEnroe, Stefanos Tsitsipas, Matteo Berrettini, Iga Świątek and many others, 100% of the proceeds going to GlobalGiving, the international non-profit identified by Tennis Plays for Peace.

== Career statistics ==
=== Grand Slam performance timelines ===
Key
W	F	SF	QF	#R	RR	Q#	DNQ	A	NH

(W) winner; (F) finalist; (SF) semifinalist; (QF) quarterfinalist; (#R) rounds 4, 3, 2, 1; (RR) round-robin stage; (Q#) qualification round; (DNQ) did not qualify; (A) absent; (NH) not held; (SR) strike rate (events won / competed); (W–L) win–loss record.
To avoid confusion and double counting, these charts are updated at the conclusion of a tournament or when the player's participation has ended.

==== Singles ====
Tournament	2015	2016	2017	2018	2019	2020	2021	2022	2023	2024	2025	2026	SR	W–L	Win %
Australian Open	A	2R	3R	1R	3R	4R	1R	4R	3R	2R	1R	2R	0 / 11	15–11	58%
French Open	A	Q1	1R	3R	2R	3R	SF	2R	1R	1R	1R	3R	0 / 10	13–10	57%
Wimbledon	A	2R	3R	1R	3R	NH	2R	3R	1R	3R	2R	3R	0 / 10	13–10	57%
US Open	1R	1R	3R	2R	3R	4R	SF	2R	1R	1R	3R	2R	0 / 12	17–12	59%
Win–loss	0–1	2–3	6–4	3–4	7–4	8–3	11–4	7–4	2–4	3–4	3–4	6–4	0 / 43	58–43	57%

==== Doubles ====
Tournament	2018	2019	2020	2021	SR	W–L	Win %
Australian Open	A	1R	1R	A	0 / 2	0–2	0%
French Open	1R	A	A	A	0 / 1	0–1	0%
Wimbledon	1R	2R	NH	A	0 / 2	1–2	33%
US Open	A	2R	A	A	0 / 1	1–1	50%
Win–loss	0–2	2–3	0–1	0–0	0 / 6	2–6	25%
