= 2025 Mubadala Citi DC Open – Women's doubles =

Women's doubles
- 2025 Mubadala Citi DC Open

Final
- Champions: (United States) Taylor Townsend (China) Zhang Shuai
- Runners-up: (United States) Caroline Dolehide (United States) Sofia Kenin
- Score: 6–1, 6–1

Details
- Draw: 16
- Seeds: 4

Events
Singles	men	women
Doubles	men	women
- Washington Open

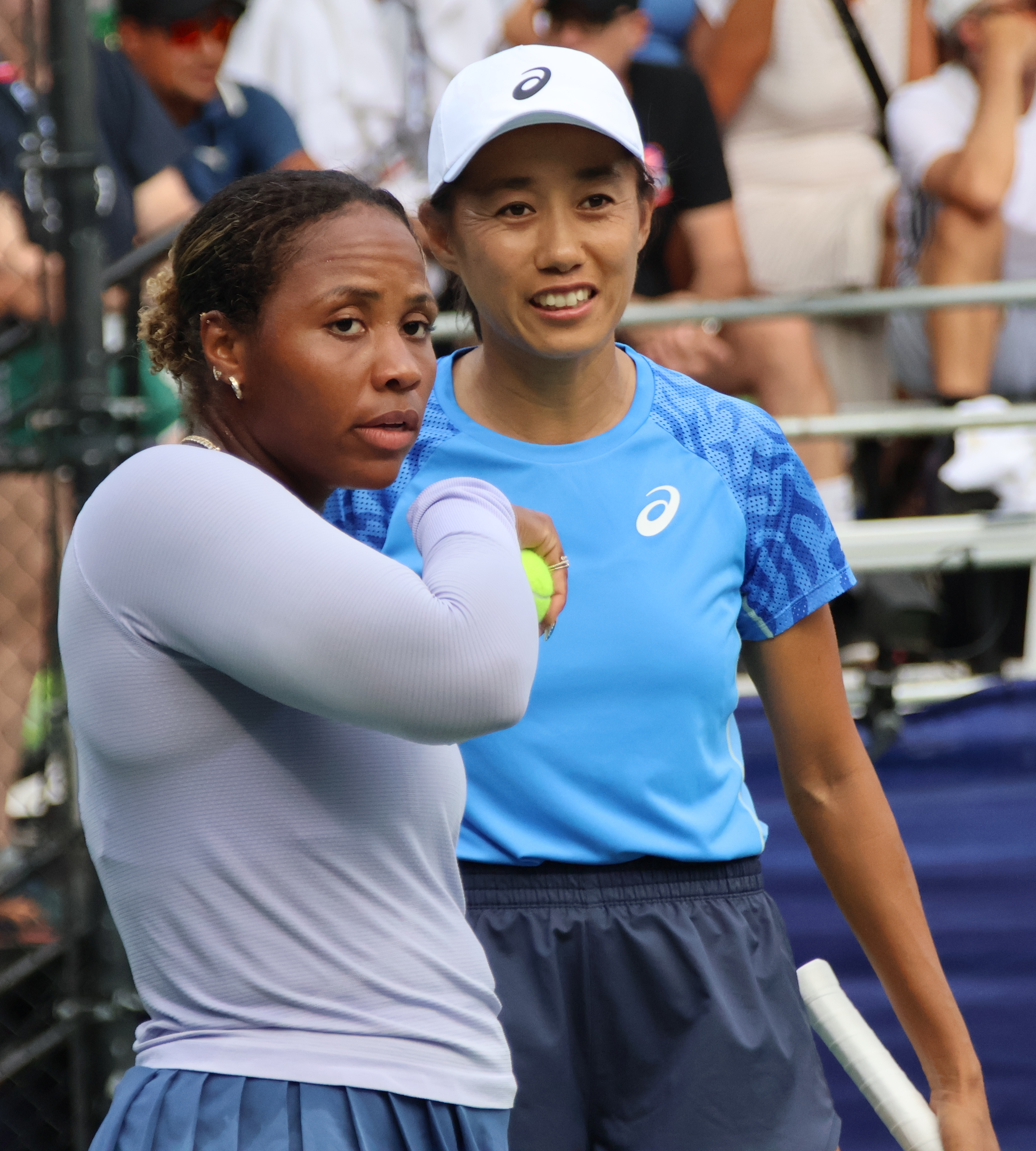
Taylor Townsend and Zhang Shuai (pictured in the first round) won the title.

Taylor Townsend and Zhang Shuai defeated Caroline Dolehide and Sofia Kenin in the final, 6–1, 6–1 to win the women's doubles tennis title at the 2025 Washington Open. Townsend attained the world No. 1 doubles ranking for the first time by reaching the final. She replaced her regular partner Kateřina Siniaková atop the doubles rankings, who did not play that week.

Asia Muhammad and Townsend were the reigning champions. Muhammad partnered Erin Routliffe, but lost in the semifinals to Dolehide and Kenin.

== Seeds ==
1. (United States) Asia Muhammad / (New Zealand) Erin Routliffe (semifinals)
2. (United States) Taylor Townsend / (China) Zhang Shuai (champions)
3. (Chinese Taipei) Chan Hao-ching / (China) Jiang Xinyu (quarterfinals)
4. (Slovakia) Tereza Mihalíková / (United Kingdom) Olivia Nicholls (first round)

== Draw ==
Key

- Q = Qualifier
- WC = Wild card
- LL = Lucky loser
- Alt = Alternate
- ITF = ITF entry
- PR = Protected ranking
- SR = Special ranking
- SE = Special exempt
- JE = Junior exempt
- JR = Junior Accelerator Programme entrant
- CO = College Accelerator Programme entrant
- NG = Next Gen Accelerator Program entrant
- w/o = Walkover
- r = Retired
- d = Defaulted

=== Draw ===
First round
1	(United States) A Muhammad (New Zealand) E Routliffe	6	4	[12]
(Norway) U Eikeri (Japan) E Hozumi	1	6	[10]
(China) Y Xu (China) Z Yang	6	6
(Australia) M Joint (Australia) E Perez	4	4
3	(Chinese Taipei) H-c Chan (China) X Jiang	6	7^{7}
(Poland) K Piter (United States) S Santamaria	1	6^{4}
(United States) C Dolehide (United States) S Kenin	7	6
PR	K Rakhimova (Kazakhstan) G Voskoboeva	5	3
(Mexico) G Olmos (Indonesia) A Sutjiadi	7	2	[12]
(Japan) M Kato (Chinese Taipei) F-h Wu	5	6	[10]
(United Kingdom) E Raducanu (Kazakhstan) E Rybakina	2	7^{7}	[11]
4	(Slovakia) T Mihalíková (United Kingdom) O Nicholls	6	6^{4}	[9]
WC	(United States) H Baptiste (United States) V Williams	6	6
WC	(Canada) E Bouchard (United States) C Ngounoue	3	1
(Spain) C Bucșa (United States) N Melichar-Martinez	3	1
2	(United States) T Townsend (China) S Zhang	6	6

Quarterfinals
1	(United States) A Muhammad (New Zealand) E Routliffe	6	5	[10]
(China) Y Xu (China) Z Yang	2	7	[7]
3	(Chinese Taipei) H-c Chan (China) X Jiang	3	4
(United States) C Dolehide (United States) S Kenin	6	6
(Mexico) G Olmos (Indonesia) A Sutjiadi	6^{6}	4
(United Kingdom) E Raducanu (Kazakhstan) E Rybakina	7^{8}	6
WC	(United States) H Baptiste (United States) V Williams	4	6	[6]
2	(United States) T Townsend (China) S Zhang	6	3	[10]

Semifinals
1	(United States) A Muhammad (New Zealand) E Routliffe	6^{4}	4
(United States) C Dolehide (United States) S Kenin	7^{7}	6
(United Kingdom) E Raducanu (Kazakhstan) E Rybakina	1^{r}
2	(United States) T Townsend (China) S Zhang	4

Final
(United States) C Dolehide (United States) S Kenin	1	1
2	(United States) T Townsend (China) S Zhang	6	6
