= 2026 ATP Masters 1000 tournaments =

Men's professional tennis tour

2026 ATP Masters 1000
Details
- Duration: March 4 – November 8
- Edition: 37th
- Tournaments: 9

Achievements (singles)
- Most titles: (Italy) Jannik Sinner (5)
- Most finals: (Italy) Jannik Sinner (5)

The 2026 ATP Masters 1000 is the thirty-seventh edition of the ATP 1000 Series. The event series is named as such as the champions of each ATP 1000 event are awarded 1,000 rankings points.

== Tournaments ==
Tournament	Location	Surface	Draw	Date	Prize money
Indian Wells Open	Indian Wells, United States	Hard	96	Mar 4–15	$9,415,725
Miami Open	Miami Gardens, United States	Hard	96	Mar 18–29	$9,415,725
Monte-Carlo Masters	Roquebrune-Cap-Martin, France	Clay (red)	56	Apr 5–12	€6,309,095
Madrid Open	Madrid, Spain	Clay (red)	96	Apr 22 – May 3	€8,235,540
Italian Open	Rome, Italy	Clay (red)	96	May 6–17	€8,235,540
Canadian Open	Montreal, Canada	Hard	96	Aug 2–13	$9,415,724
Cincinnati Open	Mason, United States	Hard	96	Aug 13–23	$9,415,725
Shanghai Masters	Shanghai, China	Hard	96	Oct 7–18	$9,415,725
Paris Masters	Nanterre, France	Hard (indoor)	56	Nov 2–8	€6,309,095

== Results ==
* First-time champion
§ Career Golden Masters

ATP Masters 1000	Singles champions	Runners-up	Score	Doubles champions	Runners-up	Score
Indian Wells Open Singles – Doubles	(Italy) Jannik Sinner	Daniil Medvedev	7–6^{(8–6)}, 7–6^{(7–4)}	(Argentina) Guido Andreozzi* (France) Manuel Guinard	(France) Arthur Rinderknech (Monaco) Valentin Vacherot	7–6^{(7–3)}, 6–3
Miami Open Singles – Doubles	(Italy) Jannik Sinner	(Czech Republic) Jiří Lehečka	6–4, 6–4	(Italy) Simone Bolelli* (Italy) Andrea Vavassori*	(Finland) Harri Heliövaara (United Kingdom) Henry Patten	6–4, 6–2
Monte-Carlo Masters Singles – Doubles	(Italy) Jannik Sinner	(Spain) Carlos Alcaraz	7–6^{(7–5)}, 6–3	(Germany) Kevin Krawietz (Germany) Tim Pütz	(El Salvador) Marcelo Arévalo (Croatia) Mate Pavić	4–6, 6–2, [10–8]
Madrid Open Singles – Doubles	(Italy) Jannik Sinner	(Germany) Alexander Zverev	6–1, 6–2	(Finland) Harri Heliövaara (United Kingdom) Henry Patten	(Argentina) Guido Andreozzi (France) Manuel Guinard	6–3, 3–6, [10–7]
Italian Open Singles – Doubles	(Italy) Jannik Sinner^{§}	(Norway) Casper Ruud	6–4, 6–4	(Italy) Simone Bolelli (Italy) Andrea Vavassori	(Spain) Marcel Granollers (Argentina) Horacio Zeballos	7–6^{(10–8)}, 6–7^{(3–7)}, [10–3]
Canadian Open Singles – Doubles	(United States) Ben Shelton	(United States) Brandon Nakashima	6–3, 7–6^{(7–4)}	(Brazil) Orlando Luz* (Brazil) Rafael Matos*	(Croatia) Mate Pavić (El Salvador) Marcelo Arévalo	5–7, 6–4, [10–6]
Cincinnati Open Singles – Doubles	(France) Arthur Fils*	(United States) Frances Tiafoe	6–3, 1–6, 6–0	(Brazil) Orlando Luz (Brazil) Rafael Matos	(Germany) Constantin Frantzen (Netherlands) Robin Haase	6–4, 3–6, [10–7]
Shanghai Masters Singles – Doubles	(Spain) Alejandro Davidovich Fokina*	(Spain) Rafael Jodar	1–6, 7–6^{(7–5)}, 6–4	(Austria) Lucas Miedler* (Austria) Neil Oberleitner*	(Portugal) Francisco Cabral (United States) James Tracy	6–3, 6-4
Paris Masters Singles – Doubles	(Spain) Carlos Alcaraz	(United States) Ben Shelton	7–6^{(7–5)}, 7–5	(France) Quentin Halys (France) Pierre-Hugues Herbert	(United States) Christian Harrison (United Kingdom) Neal Skupski	7–6^{(7–3)}, 6–7^{(4–7)}, [10–8]

== Tournament details ==
Key

- Q = Qualifier
- WC = Wild card
- LL = Lucky loser
- Alt = Alternate
- ITF = ITF entry
- PR = Protected ranking
- SR = Special ranking
- SE = Special exempt
- JE = Junior exempt
- JR = Junior Accelerator Programme entrant
- CO = College Accelerator Programme entrant
- NG = Next Gen Accelerator Program entrant
- w/o = Walkover
- r = Retired
- d = Defaulted

=== Indian Wells Open ===
==== Singles ====
Quarterfinals
1	(Spain) Carlos Alcaraz	6	6
27	(United Kingdom) Cameron Norrie	3	4
14	(United Kingdom) Jack Draper	1	5
11	Daniil Medvedev	6	7
30	(France) Arthur Fils	2	3
4	(Germany) Alexander Zverev	6	6
25	(United States) Learner Tien	1	2
2	(Italy) Jannik Sinner	6	6

Semifinals
1	(Spain) Carlos Alcaraz	3	6^{3}
11	Daniil Medvedev	6	7^{7}
4	(Germany) Alexander Zverev	2	4
2	(Italy) Jannik Sinner	6	6

Final
11	Daniil Medvedev	6^{6}	6^{4}
2	(Italy) Jannik Sinner	7^{8}	7^{7}

==== Doubles ====
Semifinals
1	(Spain) Marcel Granollers (Argentina) Horacio Zeballos	7^{15}	3	[5]
(Argentina) Guido Andreozzi (France) Manuel Guinard	6^{13}	6	[10]
(France) Arthur Rinderknech (Monaco) Valentin Vacherot	7	6^{3}	[10]
(India) Yuki Bhambri (Sweden) André Göransson	5	7^{7}	[5]

Final
(Argentina) Guido Andreozzi (France) Manuel Guinard	7^{7}	6
(France) Arthur Rinderknech (Monaco) Valentin Vacherot	6^{3}	3

=== Miami Open ===
==== Singles ====
Quarterfinals
Q	(Spain) Martín Landaluce	6^{1}	5
21	(Czech Republic) Jiří Lehečka	7^{7}	7
22	(United States) Tommy Paul	7^{7}	6^{4}	6^{6}
28	(France) Arthur Fils	6^{3}	7^{7}	7^{8}
18	(Argentina) Francisco Cerúndolo	1	2
3	(Germany) Alexander Zverev	6	6
19	(United States) Frances Tiafoe	2	2
2	(Italy) Jannik Sinner	6	6

Semifinals
21	(Czech Republic) Jiří Lehečka	6	6
28	(France) Arthur Fils	2	2
3	(Germany) Alexander Zverev	3	6^{4}
2	(Italy) Jannik Sinner	6	7^{7}

Final
21	(Czech Republic) Jiří Lehečka	4	4
2	(Italy) Jannik Sinner	6	6

==== Doubles ====
Semifinals
1	(Spain) Marcel Granollers (Argentina) Horacio Zeballos	2	3
4	(Finland) Harri Heliövaara (United Kingdom) Henry Patten	6	6
7	(Italy) Simone Bolelli (Italy) Andrea Vavassori	6	6
(Netherlands) Sander Arends (Australia) John-Patrick Smith	3	4

Final
4	(Finland) Harri Heliövaara (United Kingdom) Henry Patten	4	2
7	(Italy) Simone Bolelli (Italy) Andrea Vavassori	6	6

=== Monte-Carlo Masters ===
==== Singles ====
Quarterfinals
1	(Spain) Carlos Alcaraz	6	6
8	(Kazakhstan) Alexander Bublik	3	0
(Monaco) Valentin Vacherot	6	3	6
5	(Australia) Alex de Minaur	4	6	3
(Brazil) João Fonseca	5	7^{7}	3
3	(Germany) Alexander Zverev	7	6^{3}	6
6	(Canada) Félix Auger-Aliassime	3	4
2	(Italy) Jannik Sinner	6	6

Semifinals
1	(Spain) Carlos Alcaraz	6	6
(Monaco) Valentin Vacherot	4	4
3	(Germany) Alexander Zverev	1	4
2	(Italy) Jannik Sinner	6	6

Final
1	(Spain) Carlos Alcaraz	6^{5}	3
2	(Italy) Jannik Sinner	7^{7}	6

==== Doubles ====
Semifinals
8	(Argentina) Guido Andreozzi (France) Manuel Guinard	3	5
5	(El Salvador) Marcelo Arévalo (Croatia) Mate Pavić	6	7
(Monaco) Hugo Nys (France) Édouard Roger-Vasselin	6^{3}	6	[8]
6	(Germany) Kevin Krawietz (Germany) Tim Pütz	7^{7}	4	[10]

Final
5	(El Salvador) Marcelo Arévalo (Croatia) Mate Pavić	6	2	[8]
6	(Germany) Kevin Krawietz (Germany) Tim Pütz	4	6	[10]

=== Madrid Open ===
==== Singles ====
Quarterfinals
1	(Italy) Jannik Sinner	6	7^{7}
WC	(Spain) Rafael Jódar	2	6^{0}
21	(France) Arthur Fils	6	6
11	(Czech Republic) Jiří Lehečka	3	4
12	(Norway) Casper Ruud	4	4
(Belgium) Alexander Blockx	6	6
10	(Italy) Flavio Cobolli	1	4
2	(Germany) Alexander Zverev	6	6

Semifinals
1	(Italy) Jannik Sinner	6	6
21	(France) Arthur Fils	2	4
(Belgium) Alexander Blockx	2	5
2	(Germany) Alexander Zverev	6	7

Final
1	(Italy) Jannik Sinner	6	6
2	(Germany) Alexander Zverev	1	2

==== Doubles ====
Semifinals
(Argentina) Guido Andreozzi (France) Manuel Guinard	6	7^{7}
(Argentina) Máximo González (Argentina) Andrés Molteni	4	6^{3}
3	(Finland) Harri Heliövaara (United Kingdom) Henry Patten	6	4
(United Kingdom) Luke Johnson (Poland) Jan Zieliński	3	3^{r}

Final
(Argentina) Guido Andreozzi (France) Manuel Guinard	3	6	[7]
3	(Finland) Harri Heliövaara (United Kingdom) Henry Patten	6	3	[10]

=== Italian Open ===
==== Singles ====
Quarterfinals
1	(Italy) Jannik Sinner	6	6
12	Andrey Rublev	2	4
LL	(Spain) Martín Landaluce	6	4	5
7	Daniil Medvedev	1	6	7
23	(Norway) Casper Ruud	6	1	6
13	Karen Khachanov	1	6	2
32	(Spain) Rafael Jódar	6^{5}	7	0
18	(Italy) Luciano Darderi	7^{7}	5	6

Semifinals
1	(Italy) Jannik Sinner	6	5	6
7	Daniil Medvedev	2	7	4
23	(Norway) Casper Ruud	6	6
18	(Italy) Luciano Darderi	1	1

Final
1	(Italy) Jannik Sinner	6	6
23	(Norway) Casper Ruud	4	4

==== Doubles ====
Semifinals
7	(Italy) Simone Bolelli (Italy) Andrea Vavassori	7^{11}	3	[10]
4	(United States) Christian Harrison (United Kingdom) Neal Skupski	6^{9}	6	[6]
(United States) Austin Krajicek (Croatia) Nikola Mektić	7^{12}	5	[2]
2	(Spain) Marcel Granollers (Argentina) Horacio Zeballos	6^{10}	7	[10]

Final
7	(Italy) Simone Bolelli (Italy) Andrea Vavassori	7^{10}	6^{3}	[10]
2	(Spain) Marcel Granollers (Argentina) Horacio Zeballos	6^{8}	7^{7}	[3]

=== Canadian Open ===
==== Singles ====
Quarterfinals
(Spain) Daniel Mérida	3	2
12	(United States) Learner Tien	6	6
13	(Czech Republic) Jakub Menšík	3	1
5	(United States) Ben Shelton	6	6
20	(Spain) Rafael Jódar	7^{7}	6
18	(France) Arthur Fils	6^{5}	3
19	(Italy) Luciano Darderi	2	3
28	(United States) Brandon Nakashima	6	6

Semifinals
12	(United States) Learner Tien	2	3
5	(United States) Ben Shelton	6	6
20	(Spain) Rafael Jódar	6^{3}	4
28	(United States) Brandon Nakashima	7^{7}	6

Final
5	(United States) Ben Shelton	6	7^{7}
28	(United States) Brandon Nakashima	3	6^{4}

==== Doubles ====
Semifinals
(Argentina) Francisco Cerúndolo (Argentina) Tomás Martín Etcheverry	4	6^{7}
(Brazil) Orlando Luz (Brazil) Rafael Matos	6	7^{9}
3	(El Salvador) Marcelo Arévalo (Croatia) Mate Pavić	6	6
(France) Théo Arribagé (France) Albano Olivetti	4	4

Final
(Brazil) Orlando Luz (Brazil) Rafael Matos	5	6	[10]
3	(El Salvador) Marcelo Arévalo (Croatia) Mate Pavić	7	4	[6]

=== Cincinnati Open ===
==== Singles ====
Quarterfinals
18	(United States) Tommy Paul	6	3	4
7	(Italy) Flavio Cobolli	2	6	6
(Argentina) Thiago Agustín Tirante	3	2
21	(France) Arthur Fils	6	6
6	(United States) Taylor Fritz	6^{9}	6	3
27	(United States) Brandon Nakashima	7^{11}	4	6
10	(Italy) Lorenzo Musetti	6^{2}	5
17	(United States) Frances Tiafoe	7^{7}	7

Semifinals
7	(Italy) Flavio Cobolli	3	4
21	(France) Arthur Fils	6	6
27	(United States) Brandon Nakashima	5	3
17	(United States) Frances Tiafoe	7	6

Final
21	(France) Arthur Fils	6	1	6
17	(United States) Frances Tiafoe	3	6	0

==== Doubles ====
Semifinals
(Monaco) Hugo Nys (France) Édouard Roger-Vasselin	4	6	[2]
(Brazil) Orlando Luz (Brazil) Rafael Matos	6	2	[10]
Alt	(Germany) Constantin Frantzen (Netherlands) Robin Haase	6	3	[10]
2	(Spain) Marcel Granollers (Argentina) Horacio Zeballos	3	6	[5]

Final
(Brazil) Orlando Luz (Brazil) Rafael Matos	6	3	[10]
Alt	(Germany) Constantin Frantzen (Netherlands) Robin Haase	4	6	[7]

=== Shanghai Masters ===
==== Singles ====
Quarterfinals
1	(Germany) Alexander Zverev	6	6
9	(Australia) Alex de Minaur	4	4
(France) Arthur Géa	1^{r}
25	(Spain) Alejandro Davidovich Fokina	4
12	(Spain) Rafael Jódar	4	6	6
20	(Norway) Casper Ruud	6	4	3
5	Daniil Medvedev	6	1	6
15	(United States) Tommy Paul	3	6	3

Semifinals
1	(Germany) Alexander Zverev	7	4	3
25	(Spain) Alejandro Davidovich Fokina	5	6	6
12	(Spain) Rafael Jódar	6	6
5	Daniil Medvedev	3	4

Final
25	(Spain) Alejandro Davidovich Fokina	1	7^{7}	6
12	(Spain) Rafael Jódar	6	6^{5}	4

==== Doubles ====
Semifinals
(Germany) Jakob Schnaitter (Germany) Mark Wallner	5	3
(Austria) Lucas Miedler (Austria) Neil Oberleitner	7	6
8	(France) Théo Arribagé (France) Albano Olivetti	6	4	[8]
(Portugal) Francisco Cabral (United States) JJ Tracy	4	6	[10]

Final
(Austria) Lucas Miedler (Austria) Neil Oberleitner	6	6
(Portugal) Francisco Cabral (United States) JJ Tracy	3	4

=== Paris Masters ===
==== Singles ====
Quarterfinals
(France) Luca Van Assche	6	6^{4}	7
Q	(Australia) Rinky Hijikata	4	7^{7}	5
3	(United States) Ben Shelton	6	4	6
12	(United States) Tommy Paul	4	6	3
(Norway) Casper Ruud	7^{7}	6
LL	(Portugal) Nuno Borges	6^{5}	4
11	(United States) Taylor Fritz	7^{12}	5	3
2	(Spain) Carlos Alcaraz	6^{10}	7	6

Semifinals
(France) Luca Van Assche	7	3	4
3	(United States) Ben Shelton	5	6	6
(Norway) Casper Ruud	4	4
2	(Spain) Carlos Alcaraz	6	6

Final
3	(United States) Ben Shelton	6^{5}	5
2	(Spain) Carlos Alcaraz	7^{7}	7

==== Doubles ====
Semifinals
1	(Finland) Harri Heliövaara (United Kingdom) Henry Patten	4	6^{3}
WC	(France) Quentin Halys (France) Pierre-Hugues Herbert	6	7^{7}
(Austria) Lucas Miedler (Austria) Neil Oberleitner	4	4
2	(United States) Christian Harrison (United Kingdom) Neal Skupski	6	6

Final
WC	(France) Quentin Halys (France) Pierre-Hugues Herbert	7^{7}	6^{4}	[10]
2	(United States) Christian Harrison (United Kingdom) Neal Skupski	6^{3}	7^{7}	[8]

== See also ==
- ATP Tour Masters 1000
- ATP Tour
- 2026 WTA 1000 tournaments
- WTA Tour
