= 2026 WTA 1000 tournaments =

Women's professional tennis tour

2026 WTA 1000
Details
- Duration: February 8 – October 18
- Edition: 37th
- Tournaments: 10

Achievements (singles)
- Most titles: Aryna Sabalenka (2)
- Most finals: (United States) Coco Gauff (3)

The WTA 1000 tournaments, make up the elite tour for professional women's tennis organized by the WTA called the WTA Tour. The tier consists of ten mandatory events.

== Tournaments ==
Tournament	Location	Surface	Date	Prize money
Qatar Open	Doha, Qatar	Hard	Feb 8 – 14	$4,088,211
Dubai Tennis Championships	Dubai, United Arab Emirates	Hard	Feb 15 – 21	$4,088,211
Indian Wells Open	Indian Wells, United States	Hard	Mar 4 – 15	$9,415,725
Miami Open	Miami, United States	Hard	Mar 17 – 29	$9,415,725
Madrid Open	Madrid, Spain	Clay (red)	Apr 21 – May 3	$8,235,540
Italian Open	Rome, Italy	Clay (red)	May 5 – 17	$8,312,293
Canadian Open	Toronto, Canada	Hard	Aug 2 – 13	$7,433,076
Cincinnati Open	Cincinnati, United States	Hard	Aug 13 – 24	$7,433,076
China Open	Beijing, China	Hard	Sep 30 – Oct 11	$9,415,725
Wuhan Open	Wuhan, China	Hard	Oct 12 – 18	$4,088,211

== Results ==
* First-time champion

Tournament	Singles champions	Runners-up	Score	Doubles champions	Runners-up	Score
Qatar Open Singles – Doubles	(Czech Republic) Karolína Muchová*	(Canada) Victoria Mboko	6–4, 7–5	(Kazakhstan) Anna Danilina	(Chinese Taipei) Hsieh Su-wei (Latvia) Jeļena Ostapenko	0–6, 7–6^{(7–3)}, [10–8]
Qatar Open Singles – Doubles	(Czech Republic) Karolína Muchová*	(Canada) Victoria Mboko	6–4, 7–5	(Serbia) Aleksandra Krunić*	(Chinese Taipei) Hsieh Su-wei (Latvia) Jeļena Ostapenko	0–6, 7–6^{(7–3)}, [10–8]
Dubai Championships Singles – Doubles	(United States) Jessica Pegula	(Ukraine) Elina Svitolina	6–2, 6–4	(Canada) Gabriela Dabrowski (Brazil) Luisa Stefani	(Germany) Laura Siegemund; Vera Zvonareva	6–1, 6–3
Indian Wells Open Singles – Doubles	Aryna Sabalenka	(Kazakhstan) Elena Rybakina	3–6, 6–3, 7–6^{(8–6)}	(Czech Republic) Kateřina Siniaková (United States) Taylor Townsend	(Kazakhstan) Anna Danilina (Serbia) Aleksandra Krunić	7–6^{(7–4)}, 6–4
Miami Open Singles – Doubles	Aryna Sabalenka (2)	(United States) Coco Gauff	6–2, 4–6, 6–3	(Czech Republic) Kateřina Siniaková (2) (United States) Taylor Townsend (2)	(Italy) Sara Errani (Italy) Jasmine Paolini	7–6^{(7–0)}, 6–1
Madrid Open Singles – Doubles	(Ukraine) Marta Kostyuk*	Mirra Andreeva	6–3, 7–5	(Czech Republic) Kateřina Siniaková (3) (United States) Taylor Townsend (3)	Mirra Andreeva; Diana Shnaider	7–6^{(7–2)}, 6–2
Italian Open Singles – Doubles	(Ukraine) Elina Svitolina	(United States) Coco Gauff	6–4, 6–7^{(3–7)}, 6–2	Mirra Andreeva; Diana Shnaider	(Spain) Cristina Bucșa (United States) Nicole Melichar-Martinez	6–3, 6–3
Canadian Open Singles – Doubles	(Poland) Iga Świątek	(Kazakhstan) Elena Rybakina	6–2, 6–3	(Czech Republic) Kateřina Siniaková (4) (China) Zhang Shuai	(Italy) Sara Errani (United States) Nicole Melichar-Martinez	6–3, 6–4
Cincinnati Open Singles – Doubles	(United States) Coco Gauff	(United States) Jessica Pegula	6–2, 6–4	(Czech Republic) Marie Bouzková	(Belgium) Magali Kempen; Alexandra Panova	6–1, 6–2
Cincinnati Open Singles – Doubles	(United States) Coco Gauff	(United States) Jessica Pegula	6–2, 6–4	(Czech Republic) Linda Nosková*	(Belgium) Magali Kempen; Alexandra Panova	6–1, 6–2
China Open Singles – Doubles	(China) Zheng Qinwen*	Mirra Andreeva	7–5, 6–4	(Canada) Gabriela Dabrowski (2) (Brazil) Luisa Stefani (2)	(Czech Republic) Kateřina Siniaková (China) Zhang Shuai	6–1, 6–2
Wuhan Open Singles – Doubles	(Poland) Maja Chwalińska*	(United Kingdom) Sonay Kartal	2–6, 6–4, 6–2	(Canada) Gabriela Dabrowski (3) (Brazil) Luisa Stefani (3)	(Czech Republic) Kateřina Siniaková (Australia) Storm Hunter	7–5, 6–4

== Tournament details ==
Key

- Q = Qualifier
- WC = Wild card
- LL = Lucky loser
- Alt = Alternate
- ITF = ITF entry
- PR = Protected ranking
- SR = Special ranking
- SE = Special exempt
- JE = Junior exempt
- JR = Junior Accelerator Programme entrant
- CO = College Accelerator Programme entrant
- NG = Next Gen Accelerator Program entrant
- w/o = Walkover
- r = Retired
- d = Defaulted

=== Qatar Open ===
==== Singles ====
Quarterfinals
1	(Poland) Iga Świątek	6	4	5
(Greece) Maria Sakkari	2	6	7
14	(Czech Republic) Karolína Muchová	6	6
Anna Kalinskaya	3	4
(Latvia) Jeļena Ostapenko	7	6
LL	(Italy) Elisabetta Cocciaretto	5	4
10	(Canada) Victoria Mboko	7	4	6
2	(Kazakhstan) Elena Rybakina	5	6	4

Semifinals
(Greece) Maria Sakkari	6	4	1
14	(Czech Republic) Karolína Muchová	3	6	6
(Latvia) Jeļena Ostapenko	3	2
10	(Canada) Victoria Mboko	6	6

Final
14	(Czech Republic) Karolína Muchová	6	7
10	(Canada) Victoria Mboko	4	5

==== Doubles ====
Semifinals
1	(Italy) Sara Errani (Italy) Jasmine Paolini	5	6	[6]
3	(Chinese Taipei) Hsieh Su-wei (Latvia) Jeļena Ostapenko	7	3	[10]
4	(Kazakhstan) Anna Danilina (Serbia) Aleksandra Krunić	6	6
5	(Canada) Gabriela Dabrowski (Brazil) Luisa Stefani	3	4

Final
3	(Chinese Taipei) Hsieh Su-wei (Latvia) Jeļena Ostapenko	6	6^{3}	[8]
4	(Kazakhstan) Anna Danilina (Serbia) Aleksandra Krunić	0	7^{7}	[10]

=== Dubai Championships ===
==== Singles ====
Quarterfinals
LL	(Croatia) Antonia Ružić	6	2	3
7	(Ukraine) Elina Svitolina	3	6	6
3	(United States) Coco Gauff	6	6
(Philippines) Alexandra Eala	0	2
12	(Denmark) Clara Tauson	3	6	4
4	(United States) Jessica Pegula	6	2	6
5	Mirra Andreeva	6	5	6^{4}
2	(United States) Amanda Anisimova	2	7	7^{7}

Semifinals
7	(Ukraine) Elina Svitolina	6	6^{13}	6
3	(United States) Coco Gauff	4	7^{15}	4
4	(United States) Jessica Pegula	1	6	6
2	(United States) Amanda Anisimova	6	4	3

Final
7	(Ukraine) Elina Svitolina	2	4
4	(United States) Jessica Pegula	6	6

==== Doubles ====
Semifinals
PR	(Germany) Laura Siegemund; Vera Zvonareva	6	7^{8}
(Romania) Jaqueline Cristian (Romania) Elena-Gabriela Ruse	3	6^{6}
4	(Kazakhstan) Anna Danilina (Serbia) Aleksandra Krunić	6	2	[6]
5	(Canada) Gabriela Dabrowski (Brazil) Luisa Stefani	4	6	[10]

Final
PR	(Germany) Laura Siegemund; Vera Zvonareva	1	3
5	(Canada) Gabriela Dabrowski (Brazil) Luisa Stefani	6	6

=== Indian Wells Open ===
==== Singles ====
Quarterfinals
1	Aryna Sabalenka	7^{7}	6
10	(Canada) Victoria Mboko	6^{0}	4
14	(Czech Republic) Linda Nosková	6	4	6
Q	(Australia) Talia Gibson	2	6	2
5	(United States) Jessica Pegula	1	6^{4}
3	(Kazakhstan) Elena Rybakina	6	7^{7}
9	(Ukraine) Elina Svitolina	6	4	6
2	(Poland) Iga Świątek	2	6	4

Semifinals
1	Aryna Sabalenka	6	6
14	(Czech Republic) Linda Nosková	3	4
3	(Kazakhstan) Elena Rybakina	7	6
9	(Ukraine) Elina Svitolina	5	4

Final
1	Aryna Sabalenka	3	6	7^{8}
3	(Kazakhstan) Elena Rybakina	6	3	6^{6}

==== Doubles ====
Semifinals
1	(Italy) Sara Errani (Italy) Jasmine Paolini	2	2
3	(Czech Republic) Kateřina Siniaková (United States) Taylor Townsend	6	6
5	(Kazakhstan) Anna Danilina (Serbia) Aleksandra Krunić	6	6
7	(Spain) Cristina Bucșa (United States) Nicole Melichar-Martinez	3	4

Final
3	(Czech Republic) Kateřina Siniaková (United States) Taylor Townsend	7^{7}	6
5	(Kazakhstan) Anna Danilina (Serbia) Aleksandra Krunić	6^{4}	4

=== Miami Open ===
==== Singles ====
Quarterfinals
1	Aryna Sabalenka	6	6
(United States) Hailey Baptiste	4	4
3	(Kazakhstan) Elena Rybakina	2	6	6
5	(United States) Jessica Pegula	6	3	4
12	(Switzerland) Belinda Bencic	3	6	3
4	(United States) Coco Gauff	6	1	6
10	(Canada) Victoria Mboko	5	6^{5}
13	(Czech Republic) Karolína Muchová	7	7^{7}

Semifinals
1	Aryna Sabalenka	6	6
3	(Kazakhstan) Elena Rybakina	4	3
4	(United States) Coco Gauff	6	6
13	(Czech Republic) Karolína Muchová	1	1

Final
1	Aryna Sabalenka	6	4	6
4	(United States) Coco Gauff	2	6	3

==== Doubles ====
Semifinals
1	(Italy) Sara Errani (Italy) Jasmine Paolini	2
4	(Belgium) Elise Mertens (China) Zhang Shuai	1^{r}
3	(Canada) Gabriela Dabrowski (Brazil) Luisa Stefani	6	4	[3]
2	(Czech Republic) Kateřina Siniaková (United States) Taylor Townsend	4	6	[10]

Final
1	(Italy) Sara Errani (Italy) Jasmine Paolini	6^{0}	1
2	(Czech Republic) Kateřina Siniaková (United States) Taylor Townsend	7^{7}	6

=== Madrid Open ===
==== Singles ====
Quarterfinals
1	Aryna Sabalenka	6	2	6^{6}
30	(United States) Hailey Baptiste	2	6	7^{8}
24	(Canada) Leylah Fernandez	6^{1}	3
9	Mirra Andreeva	7^{7}	6
26	(Ukraine) Marta Kostyuk	7^{7}	6
13	(Czech Republic) Linda Nosková	6^{1}	0
PR	(Czech Republic) Karolína Plíšková	1	7^{7}	3
LL	(Austria) Anastasia Potapova	6	6^{4}	6

Semifinals
30	(United States) Hailey Baptiste	4	6^{8}
9	Mirra Andreeva	6	7^{10}
26	(Ukraine) Marta Kostyuk	6	1	6
LL	(Austria) Anastasia Potapova	2	6	1

Final
9	Mirra Andreeva	3	5
26	(Ukraine) Marta Kostyuk	6	7

==== Doubles ====
Semifinals
(Germany) Laura Siegemund; Vera Zvonareva	3	2
Mirra Andreeva; Diana Shnaider	6	6
(Serbia) Aleksandra Krunić (France) Kristina Mladenovic	4	5
2	(Czech Republic) Kateřina Siniaková (United States) Taylor Townsend	6	7

Final
Mirra Andreeva; Diana Shnaider	6^{2}	2
2	(Czech Republic) Kateřina Siniaková (United States) Taylor Townsend	7^{7}	6

=== Italian Open ===
==== Singles ====
Quarterfinals
26	(Romania) Sorana Cîrstea	6	7^{7}
(Latvia) Jeļena Ostapenko	1	6^{0}
3	(United States) Coco Gauff	4	6	6
8	Mirra Andreeva	6	2	4
5	(United States) Jessica Pegula	1	2
4	(Poland) Iga Świątek	6	6
7	(Ukraine) Elina Svitolina	2	6	6
2	(Kazakhstan) Elena Rybakina	6	4	4

Semifinals
26	(Romania) Sorana Cîrstea	4	3
3	(United States) Coco Gauff	6	6
4	(Poland) Iga Świątek	4	6	2
7	(Ukraine) Elina Svitolina	6	2	6

Final
3	(United States) Coco Gauff	4	7^{7}	2
7	(Ukraine) Elina Svitolina	6	6^{3}	6

==== Doubles ====
Semifinals
(Australia) Storm Hunter (United States) Jessica Pegula	1	2
Mirra Andreeva; Diana Shnaider	6	6
7	(Spain) Cristina Bucșa (United States) Nicole Melichar-Martinez	6	6
2	(Czech Republic) Kateřina Siniaková (United States) Taylor Townsend	4	4

Final
Mirra Andreeva; Diana Shnaider	6	6
7	(Spain) Cristina Bucșa (United States) Nicole Melichar-Martinez	3	3

=== Canadian Open ===
==== Singles ====
Quarterfinals
16	Ekaterina Alexandrova	6	0	3
9	(Ukraine) Elina Svitolina	3	6	6
15	Diana Shnaider	2	1
7	(Poland) Iga Świątek	6	6
12	(Switzerland) Belinda Bencic
4	(United States) Coco Gauff	w/o
11	(Japan) Naomi Osaka	6	6^{5}	4
2	(Kazakhstan) Elena Rybakina	4	7^{7}	6

Semifinals
9	(Ukraine) Elina Svitolina	3	6	3
7	(Poland) Iga Świątek	6	1	6
4	(United States) Coco Gauff	7	2	2
2	(Kazakhstan) Elena Rybakina	5	6	6

Final
7	(Poland) Iga Świątek	6	6
2	(Kazakhstan) Elena Rybakina	2	3

==== Doubles ====
Semifinals
1	(Czech Republic) Kateřina Siniaková (China) Zhang Shuai	6	7
(Slovakia) Tereza Mihalíková (United Kingdom) Olivia Nicholls	1	5
3	(Italy) Sara Errani (United States) Nicole Melichar-Martinez	6	4	[10]
5	(Chinese Taipei) Hsieh Su-wei (Latvia) Jeļena Ostapenko	1	6	[8]

Final
1	(Czech Republic) Kateřina Siniaková (China) Zhang Shuai	6	6
3	(Italy) Sara Errani (United States) Nicole Melichar-Martinez	3	4

=== Cincinnati Open ===
==== Singles ====
Quarterfinals
(Czech Republic) Sára Bejlek	3	6	7^{7}
20	(United States) Madison Keys	6	4	6^{5}
4	(United States) Coco Gauff	6	6
10	(Ukraine) Marta Kostyuk	2	2
9	(United States) Amanda Anisimova	4	6	6^{4}
3	(United States) Jessica Pegula	6	2	7^{7}
7	(Poland) Iga Świątek	4
2	(Kazakhstan) Elena Rybakina	1^{r}

Semifinals
(Czech Republic) Sára Bejlek	4	1
4	(United States) Coco Gauff	6	6
3	(United States) Jessica Pegula	7	4	6
7	(Poland) Iga Świątek	5	6	4

Final
4	(United States) Coco Gauff	6	6
3	(United States) Jessica Pegula	2	4

==== Doubles ====
Semifinals
(United States) Iva Jovic (United States) Caty McNally	3	2
(Czech Republic) Marie Bouzková (Czech Republic) Linda Nosková	6	6
5	(Chinese Taipei) Hsieh Su-wei (Latvia) Jeļena Ostapenko	3	5
(Belgium) Magali Kempen; Alexandra Panova	6	7

Final
(Czech Republic) Marie Bouzková (Czech Republic) Linda Nosková	6	6
(Belgium) Magali Kempen; Alexandra Panova	1	2

=== China Open ===
==== Singles ====
Quarterfinals
WC	(China) Zheng Qinwen	6	7^{8}
6	(Ukraine) Elina Svitolina	3	6^{6}
13	(Belgium) Elise Mertens	7^{7}	6
8	(Poland) Iga Świątek	6^{0}	3
19	Ekaterina Alexandrova	6^{4}	6^{3}
4	Mirra Andreeva	7^{7}	7^{7}
7	(Czech Republic) Karolína Muchová	3	0
26	(Czech Republic) Nikola Bartůňková	6	6

Semifinals
WC	(China) Zheng Qinwen	7	6
13	(Belgium) Elise Mertens	5	2
4	Mirra Andreeva	6	6
26	(Czech Republic) Nikola Bartůňková	2	2

Final
WC	(China) Zheng Qinwen	7	6
4	Mirra Andreeva	5	4

==== Doubles ====
Semifinals
1	(Czech Republic) Kateřina Siniaková (China) Zhang Shuai	6	6
(New Zealand) Erin Routliffe (Indonesia) Aldila Sutjiadi	4	2
6	(Belgium) Elise Mertens; Diana Shnaider	4	6	[7]
2	(Canada) Gabriela Dabrowski (Brazil) Luisa Stefani	6	3	[10]

Final
1	(Czech Republic) Kateřina Siniaková (China) Zhang Shuai	1	2
2	(Canada) Gabriela Dabrowski (Brazil) Luisa Stefani	6	6

=== Wuhan Open ===
==== Singles ====
Quarterfinals
(United States) Ann Li	4	1
7	(Poland) Iga Świątek	6	6
16	(Poland) Maja Chwalińska	6	3	7
(Greece) Maria Sakkari	0	6	5
5	(Ukraine) Elina Svitolina	2	6	4
PR	(United Kingdom) Sonay Kartal	6	2	6
11	Diana Shnaider	6^{6}	1
(Latvia) Jeļena Ostapenko	7^{8}	6

Semifinals
7	(Poland) Iga Świątek	5	1
16	(Poland) Maja Chwalińska	7	6
PR	(United Kingdom) Sonay Kartal	7^{11}	7^{7}
(Latvia) Jeļena Ostapenko	6^{9}	6^{5}

Final
16	(Poland) Maja Chwalińska	2	6	6
PR	(United Kingdom) Sonay Kartal	6	4	2

==== Doubles ====
Semifinals
1	(Canada) Gabriela Dabrowski (Brazil) Luisa Stefani	6	6
5	(Spain) Cristina Bucșa (United States) Nicole Melichar-Martinez	2	1
3	(Australia) Storm Hunter (Czech Republic) Kateřina Siniaková	5	7	[12]
8	(Italy) Sara Errani (Italy) Jasmine Paolini	7	5	[10]

Final
1	(Canada) Gabriela Dabrowski (Brazil) Luisa Stefani	7	6
3	(Australia) Storm Hunter (Czech Republic) Kateřina Siniaková	5	4

== See also ==
- WTA 1000 tournaments
- 2026 WTA Tour
- 2026 ATP Masters 1000 tournaments
- 2026 ATP Tour
