= 2026 National Bank Open – Women's doubles =

Women's doubles
- 2026 National Bank Open

Final
- Champions: (Czech Republic) Kateřina Siniaková (China) Zhang Shuai
- Runners-up: (Italy) Sara Errani (United States) Nicole Melichar-Martinez
- Score: 6–3, 6–4
- Date: 13 August 2026

Details
- Draw: 32
- Seeds: 8

Events
Singles	men	women
Doubles	men	women
- National Bank Open

Kateřina Siniaková and Zhang Shuai defeated Sara Errani and Nicole Melichar-Martinez in the final, 6–3, 6–4 to win the women's doubles tennis title at the 2026 Canadian Open.

Coco Gauff and McCartney Kessler were the defending champions, but chose to compete with different partners. Gauff partnered Caty McNally, but lost in the second round to Siniaková and Zhang. Kessler partnered Jessica Pegula, but lost in the first round to Errani and Melichar-Martinez.

== Seeds ==
1. (Czech Republic) Kateřina Siniaková / (China) Zhang Shuai (champions)
2. (Kazakhstan) Anna Danilina / (Serbia) Aleksandra Krunić (first round)
3. (Italy) Sara Errani / (United States) Nicole Melichar-Martinez (final)
4. (China) Guo Hanyu / (France) Kristina Mladenovic (first round)
5. (Chinese Taipei) Hsieh Su-wei / (Latvia) Jeļena Ostapenko (semifinals)
6. (Belgium) Elise Mertens / Diana Shnaider (quarterfinals)
7. (Australia) Ellen Perez / (Netherlands) Demi Schuurs (quarterfinals)
8. (Japan) Shuko Aoyama / (Chinese Taipei) Liang En-shuo (first round)

== Draw ==
Key

- Q = Qualifier
- WC = Wild card
- LL = Lucky loser
- Alt = Alternate
- ITF = ITF entry
- PR = Protected ranking
- SR = Special ranking
- SE = Special exempt
- JE = Junior exempt
- JR = Junior Accelerator Programme entrant
- CO = College Accelerator Programme entrant
- NG = Next Gen Accelerator Program entrant
- w/o = Walkover
- r = Retired
- d = Defaulted

=== Finals ===
Semifinals
1	(Czech Republic) Kateřina Siniaková (China) Zhang Shuai	6	7
(Slovakia) Tereza Mihalíková (United Kingdom) Olivia Nicholls	1	5
3	(Italy) Sara Errani (United States) Nicole Melichar-Martinez	6	4	[10]
5	(Chinese Taipei) Hsieh Su-wei (Latvia) Jeļena Ostapenko	1	6	[8]

Final
1	(Czech Republic) Kateřina Siniaková (China) Zhang Shuai	6	6
3	(Italy) Sara Errani (United States) Nicole Melichar-Martinez	3	4

=== Top half ===
First round
1	(Czech Republic) K Siniaková (China) S Zhang	6	6
M Andreeva (Romania) S Cîrstea	2	2
E Alexandrova (Canada) G Dabrowski	6	3	[9]
(United States) C Gauff (United States) C McNally	3	6	[11]
(Australia) S Hunter (United States) D Krawczyk	6	6
(Poland) K Piter (Indonesia) J Tjen	4	0
(Chinese Taipei) H-c Chan (Australia) M Joint	6	6
8	(Japan) S Aoyama (Chinese Taipei) E-s Liang	2	3
4	(China) H Guo (France) K Mladenovic	3	7^{7}	[5]
(New Zealand) E Routliffe (Indonesia) A Sutjiadi	6	6^{4}	[10]
(Spain) C Bucșa (Hong Kong) E Chong	6	5	[9]
(Slovakia) T Mihalíková (United Kingdom) O Nicholls	4	7	[11]
(China) X Jiang (Chinese Taipei) F-h Wu	6	0	[10]
(Czech Republic) M Bouzková (Czech Republic) L Nosková	4	6	[6]
WC	(Canada) B Fernandez (Canada) L Fernandez	1	2
6	(Belgium) E Mertens; D Shnaider	6	6

Second round
1	(Czech Republic) K Siniaková (China) S Zhang	6	6
(United States) C Gauff (United States) C McNally	0	4
(Australia) S Hunter (United States) D Krawczyk	6	6
(Chinese Taipei) H-c Chan (Australia) M Joint	2	2
(New Zealand) E Routliffe (Indonesia) A Sutjiadi	3	5
(Slovakia) T Mihalíková (United Kingdom) O Nicholls	6	7
(China) X Jiang (Chinese Taipei) F-h Wu	3	3
6	(Belgium) E Mertens; D Shnaider	6	6

Quarterfinals
1	(Czech Republic) K Siniaková (China) S Zhang	6	6
(Australia) S Hunter (United States) D Krawczyk	4	3
(Slovakia) T Mihalíková (United Kingdom) O Nicholls	7	6
6	(Belgium) E Mertens; D Shnaider	5	4

Semifinals
1	(Czech Republic) K Siniaková (China) S Zhang	6	7
(Slovakia) T Mihalíková (United Kingdom) O Nicholls	1	5

=== Bottom half ===
First round
7	(Australia) E Perez (Netherlands) D Schuurs	7	6
(Ukraine) N Kichenok (United Kingdom) M Lumsden	5	4
(United States) A Muhammad (Hungary) F Stollár	4	6	[10]
(China) Q Tang (China) Y Xu	6	3	[7]
(Japan) M Kato; L Samsonova	6	6
WC	(Philippines) A Eala (United States) V Williams	4	3
(United States) M Kessler (United States) J Pegula	2	6	[8]
3	(Italy) S Errani (United States) N Melichar-Martinez	6	3	[10]
5	(Chinese Taipei) S-w Hsieh (Latvia) J Ostapenko	6	6
(Greece) M Sakkari (Croatia) D Vekić	2	2
WC	(Canada) B Andreescu (Canada) K Cross	4	6^{3}
(Norway) U Eikeri (United States) Q Gleason	6	7^{7}
(United States) A Li (Denmark) C Tauson	6	7
(Belgium) M Kempen; A Panova	2	5
PR	(Estonia) I Neel (Mexico) G Olmos	6	7
2	(Kazakhstan) A Danilina (Serbia) A Krunić	4	5

Second round
7	(Australia) E Perez (Netherlands) D Schuurs	6	6
(United States) A Muhammad (Hungary) F Stollár	4	2
(Japan) M Kato; L Samsonova	2	2
3	(Italy) S Errani (United States) N Melichar-Martinez	6	6
5	(Chinese Taipei) S-w Hsieh (Latvia) J Ostapenko	6	7^{7}
(Norway) U Eikeri (United States) Q Gleason	4	6^{1}
(United States) A Li (Denmark) C Tauson	4	7^{7}	[11]
PR	(Estonia) I Neel (Mexico) G Olmos	6	6^{3}	[9]

Quarterfinals
7	(Australia) E Perez (Netherlands) D Schuurs	2	2
3	(Italy) S Errani (United States) N Melichar-Martinez	6	6
5	(Chinese Taipei) S-w Hsieh (Latvia) J Ostapenko	7^{7}	6
(United States) A Li (Denmark) C Tauson	6^{4}	4

Semifinals
3	(Italy) S Errani (United States) N Melichar-Martinez	6	4	[10]
5	(Chinese Taipei) S-w Hsieh (Latvia) J Ostapenko	1	6	[8]

== Seeded teams ==
The following are the seeded teams. Seedings are based on WTA rankings as of 27 July 2026.

Country	Player	Country	Player	Rank	Seed
CZE	Kateřina Siniaková	CHN	Zhang Shuai	9	1
KAZ	Anna Danilina	SRB	Aleksandra Krunić	11	2
ITA	Sara Errani	USA	Nicole Melichar-Martinez	21	3
CHN	Guo Hanyu	FRA	Kristina Mladenovic	22	4
TPE	Hsieh Su-wei	LAT	Jeļena Ostapenko	32	5
BEL	Elise Mertens		Diana Shnaider	40	6
AUS	Ellen Perez	NED	Demi Schuurs	42	7
JPN	Shuko Aoyama	TPE	Liang En-shuo	46	8

== Other entry information ==
=== Wildcards ===
- (Canada) Bianca Andreescu / (Canada) Kayla Cross
- (Philippines) Alexandra Eala / (United States) Venus Williams
- (Canada) Bianca Fernandez / (Canada) Leylah Fernandez

=== Protected ranking ===
- (Estonia) Ingrid Neel / (Mexico) Giuliana Olmos
