= 2026 National Bank Open – Men's singles =

Tennis tournament in Montreal, Canada

Men's singles
- 2026 National Bank Open

Final
- Champion: (United States) Ben Shelton
- Runner-up: (United States) Brandon Nakashima
- Score: 6–3, 7–6^{(7–4)}
- Date: 13 August 2026

Details
- Draw: 96 (16 Q / 6 WC )
- Seeds: 32

Events
| Singles | men | women |
| Doubles | men | women |
- Canadian Open

Defending champion Ben Shelton defeated Brandon Nakashima in the final, 6–3, 7–6^{(7–4)} to win the men's singles tennis title at the 2026 Canadian Open. It was his 2nd ATP Masters 1000 title, 4th ATP Tour title of the year and 7th ATP Tour title overall. Shelton did not lose a set en route to his second ATP Masters 1000 title, and he was the first player to successfully defend the men's singles title since Rafael Nadal in 2019.

The fourth-round loss of Cameron Norrie guaranteed a first-time ATP Masters 1000 finalist from the bottom half of the draw. Nakashima emerged to become that player.

This marked the first ATP Tour tournament in which all eight quarterfinalists were born in the 2000s, and the first Masters event since the 2007 Paris Masters in which all eight quarterfinalists were aged 25 or under. It also marked the first all-American ATP 1000 final since the 2003 Cincinnati Open.

== Seeds ==
All seeds received a bye into the second round.

1. (Germany) Alexander Zverev (second round)
2. (Canada) Félix Auger-Aliassime (withdrew)
3. (Australia) Alex de Minaur (third round)
4. Daniil Medvedev (second round)
5. (United States) Ben Shelton (champion)
6. (Italy) Flavio Cobolli (second round)
7. (United States) Taylor Fritz (second round)
8. (Czech Republic) Jiří Lehečka (fourth round)
9. (Norway) Casper Ruud (third round)
10. Andrey Rublev (second round)
11. (Italy) Lorenzo Musetti (third round)
12. (United States) Learner Tien (semifinals)
13. (Czech Republic) Jakub Menšík (quarterfinals)
14. (Monaco) Valentin Vacherot (second round)
15. (United States) Frances Tiafoe (third round, retired)
16. (Argentina) Francisco Cerúndolo (second round)
17. (United States) Tommy Paul (third round)
18. (France) Arthur Fils (quarterfinals)
19. (Italy) Luciano Darderi (quarterfinals)
20. (Spain) Rafael Jódar (semifinals)
21. Karen Khachanov (second round)
22. (Brazil) João Fonseca (fourth round)
23. (France) Arthur Rinderknech (fourth round)
24. (France) Ugo Humbert (second round)
25. (Chile) Alejandro Tabilo (second round)
26. (Argentina) Tomás Martín Etcheverry (second round)
27. (Belgium) Alexander Blockx (third round)
28. (United States) Brandon Nakashima (final)
29. (Peru) Ignacio Buse (second round)
30. (Italy) Matteo Arnaldi (third round)
31. (Belgium) Zizou Bergs (third round)
32. (Belgium) Raphaël Collignon (second round)

Click on the seed number of a player to go to their draw section.

== Draw ==
Key

- Q = Qualifier
- WC = Wild card
- LL = Lucky loser
- Alt = Alternate
- ITF = ITF entry
- PR = Protected ranking
- SR = Special ranking
- SE = Special exempt
- JE = Junior exempt
- JR = Junior Accelerator Programme entrant
- CO = College Accelerator Programme entrant
- NG = Next Gen Accelerator Program entrant
- w/o = Walkover
- r = Retired
- d = Defaulted

=== Finals ===
Quarterfinals
(Spain) Daniel Mérida | 3 | 2
12 | (United States) Learner Tien | 6 | 6
13 | (Czech Republic) Jakub Menšík | 3 | 1
5 | (United States) Ben Shelton | 6 | 6
20 | (Spain) Rafael Jódar | 7^{7} | 6
18 | (France) Arthur Fils | 6^{5} | 3
19 | (Italy) Luciano Darderi | 2 | 3
28 | (United States) Brandon Nakashima | 6 | 6

Semifinals
12 | (United States) Learner Tien | 2 | 3
5 | (United States) Ben Shelton | 6 | 6
20 | (Spain) Rafael Jódar | 6^{3} | 4
28 | (United States) Brandon Nakashima | 7^{7} | 6

Final
5 | (United States) Ben Shelton | 6 | 7^{7}
28 | (United States) Brandon Nakashima | 3 | 6^{4}

=== Top half ===
==== Section 1 ====
First round
(Italy) L Sonego | 6^{5} | 5
(Netherlands) T Griekspoor | 7^{7} | 7
Q | (Japan) S Mochizuki | 4 | 3
(Hungary) F Marozsán | 6 | 6
(Spain) D Mérida | 3 | 6 | 6
WC | (Canada) L Draxl | 6 | 4 | 4
(United States) A Michelsen | 6 | 3 | 6
(Germany) J-L Struff | 1 | 6 | 1

Second round
1 | (Germany) A Zverev | 7^{7} | 2 | 4
(Netherlands) T Griekspoor | 6^{3} | 6 | 6
(Hungary) F Marozsán | 5 | 6 | 4
30 | (Italy) M Arnaldi | 7 | 2 | 6
24 | (France) U Humbert | 3 | 3
(Spain) D Mérida | 6 | 6
(United States) A Michelsen | 6 | 6
16 | (Argentina) F Cerúndolo | 3 | 4

Third round
(Netherlands) T Griekspoor | 3 | 6 | 6
30 | (Italy) M Arnaldi | 6 | 4 | 3
(Spain) D Mérida | 6 | 6^{4} | 6
(United States) A Michelsen | 4 | 7^{7} | 1

Fourth round
(Netherlands) T Griekspoor | 3 | 1
(Spain) D Mérida | 6 | 6

==== Section 2 ====
First round
(Poland) K Majchrzak | 4 | 4
WC | (France) G Monfils | 6 | 6
(Spain) P Carreño Busta | 6 | 5 | 2
(France) V Royer | 1 | 7 | 6
Q | (Australia) A Popyrin | 4 | 7 | 6
(Argentina) RA Burruchaga | 6 | 5 | 3
Q | (Canada) D Chan | 3 | 6 | 6^{3}
(Argentina) TA Tirante | 6 | 1 | 7^{7}

Second round
12 | (United States) L Tien | 6 | 0 | 6
WC | (France) G Monfils | 3 | 6 | 3
(France) V Royer | 4 | 6^{5}
17 | (United States) T Paul | 6 | 7^{7}
32 | (Belgium) R Collignon | 4 | 3
Q | (Australia) A Popyrin | 6 | 6
(Argentina) TA Tirante | 7 | 6
7 | (United States) T Fritz | 5 | 3

Third round
12 | (United States) L Tien | 6 | 6
17 | (United States) T Paul | 3 | 2
Q | (Australia) A Popyrin | 3 | 4
(Argentina) TA Tirante | 6 | 6

Fourth round
12 | (United States) L Tien | 6 | 6
(Argentina) TA Tirante | 4 | 4

==== Section 3 ====
First round
(France) G Mpetshi Perricard | 2 | 6 | 3
(Netherlands) B van de Zandschulp | 6 | 3 | 6
PR | (Poland) H Hurkacz | 7 | 4 | 6
Q | (United States) M Giron | 5 | 6 | 2
(France) T Atmane | 6 | 2 | 6
WC | (United Kingdom) J Draper | 3 | 6 | 2
Q | (United Kingdom) J Fearnley | 7^{7} | 6
(France) A Mannarino | 6^{3} | 4

Second round
4 | D Medvedev | 3 | 6^{5}
(Netherlands) B van de Zandschulp | 6 | 7^{7}
PR | (Poland) H Hurkacz | 6 | 7^{7}
25 | (Chile) A Tabilo | 4 | 6^{4}
21 | K Khachanov | 4 | 6^{3}
(France) T Atmane | 6 | 7^{7}
Q | (United Kingdom) J Fearnley | 3 | 6 | 3
13 | (Czech Republic) J Menšík | 6 | 3 | 6

Third round
(Netherlands) B van de Zandschulp | 3 | 7^{7} | 7
PR | (Poland) H Hurkacz | 6 | 6^{4} | 5
(France) T Atmane | 5 | 4
13 | (Czech Republic) J Menšík | 7 | 6

Fourth round
(Netherlands) B van de Zandschulp | 4 | 5
13 | (Czech Republic) J Menšík | 6 | 7

==== Section 4 ====
First round
(Argentina) JM Cerúndolo | 6 | 6
(Serbia) H Medjedovic | 4 | 2
Q | (United States) M Damm | 4 | 4
Q | (Greece) S Tsitsipas | 6 | 6
(Argentina) S Báez | 7 | 6
(Italy) M Bellucci | 5 | 3
Q | (Australia) A Walton | 3 | 4
(United States) J Brooksby | 6 | 6

Second round
9 | (Norway) C Ruud | 6 | 6
(Argentina) JM Cerúndolo | 1 | 2
Q | (Greece) S Tsitsipas | 6^{3} | 5
22 | (Brazil) J Fonseca | 7^{7} | 7
31 | (Belgium) Z Bergs | 3 | 6 | 6
(Argentina) S Báez | 6 | 3 | 2
(United States) J Brooksby | 3 | 5
5 | (United States) B Shelton | 6 | 7

Third round
9 | (Norway) C Ruud | 6^{6} | 3
22 | (Brazil) J Fonseca | 7^{8} | 6
31 | (Belgium) Z Bergs | 3 | 2
5 | (United States) B Shelton | 6 | 6

Fourth round
22 | (Brazil) J Fonseca | 3 | 6^{3}
5 | (United States) B Shelton | 6 | 7^{7}

=== Bottom half ===
==== Section 5 ====
First round
WC | (Canada) A Galarneau | 4 | 4
(Czech Republic) V Kopřiva | 6 | 6
(Spain) J Munar | 7^{7} | 6
(Australia) R Hijikata | 6^{3} | 3
(Hungary) M Fucsovics | 1 | 2
(France) C Moutet | 6 | 6
Q | (Colombia) N Mejía | 4 | 6 | 6
(Spain) M Landaluce | 6 | 4 | 3

Second round
8 | (Czech Republic) J Lehečka | 6 | 6
(Czech Republic) V Kopřiva | 4 | 2
(Spain) J Munar
27 | (Belgium) A Blockx | w/o
20 | (Spain) R Jódar | 4 | 6 | 6
(France) C Moutet | 6 | 1 | 3
Q | (Colombia) N Mejía | 6^{8} | 2
11 | (Italy) L Musetti | 7^{10} | 6

Third round
8 | (Czech Republic) J Lehečka | 6 | 6
27 | (Belgium) A Blockx | 3 | 4
20 | (Spain) R Jódar | 6 | 6
11 | (Italy) L Musetti | 4 | 3

Fourth round
8 | (Czech Republic) J Lehečka | 3 | 3
20 | (Spain) R Jódar | 6 | 6

==== Section 6 ====
First round
(Italy) M Berrettini | 3 | 7^{7} | 3
(Argentina) M Navone | 6 | 6^{5} | 6
(United States) Z Svajda | 4 | 6 | 3
(Canada) D Shapovalov | 6 | 4 | 0^{r}
(Argentina) C Ugo Carabelli | 6^{5} | 4
(United Kingdom) C Norrie | 7^{7} | 6
(Australia) J Duckworth | 6 | 6
Q | (Australia) C O'Connell | 3 | 1

Second round
14 | (Monaco) V Vacherot | 6 | 3 | 3
(Argentina) M Navone | 1 | 6 | 6
(United States) Z Svajda | 4 | 6 | 1
18 | (France) A Fils | 6 | 3 | 6
29 | (Peru) I Buse | 3 | 3
(United Kingdom) C Norrie | 6 | 6
(Australia) J Duckworth | 2 | 6^{6}
3 | (Australia) A de Minaur | 6 | 7^{8}

Third round
(Argentina) M Navone | 3 | 2
18 | (France) A Fils | 6 | 6
(United Kingdom) C Norrie | 5 | 7^{7} | 6
3 | (Australia) A de Minaur | 7 | 6^{5} | 1

Fourth round
18 | (France) A Fils | 6 | 7^{10}
(United Kingdom) C Norrie | 2 | 6^{8}

==== Section 7 ====
First round
Q | (France) B Bonzi | 1 | 6 | 2
(Germany) Y Hanfmann | 6 | 4 | 6
(United States) A Kovacevic | 7^{9} | 2 | 4
(Portugal) N Borges | 6^{7} | 6 | 6
WC | (Canada) G Diallo | 6^{1} | 6 | 6
Q | (France) K Jacquet | 7^{7} | 3 | 2
(Paraguay) AD Vallejo | 3 | 3
PR | (China) J Shang | 6 | 6

Second round
6 | (Italy) F Cobolli | 6^{5} | 6^{2}
(Germany) Y Hanfmann | 7^{7} | 7^{7}
(Portugal) N Borges | 6 | 6
26 | (Argentina) TM Etcheverry | 4 | 2
19 | (Italy) L Darderi | 6 | 2
WC | (Canada) G Diallo | 4 | 3^{r}
PR | (China) J Shang | 7 | 4 | 7^{7}
10 | A Rublev | 5 | 6 | 6^{5}

Third round
(Germany) Y Hanfmann | 4 | 2
(Portugal) N Borges | 6 | 6
19 | (Italy) L Darderi | 4 | 6 | 6
PR | (China) J Shang | 6 | 1 | 4

Fourth round
(Portugal) N Borges | 6 | 3 | 5
19 | (Italy) L Darderi | 4 | 6 | 7

==== Section 8 ====
First round
Q | (Japan) S Shimabukuro | 6^{2} | 1
(Croatia) M Čilić | 7^{7} | 6
Q | (United States) M Zheng | 4 | 6 | 6^{5}
(Serbia) M Kecmanović | 6 | 4 | 7^{7}
Q | (Australia) A Vukic | 7^{7} | 6^{5} | 4
(Germany) D Altmaier | 6^{2} | 7^{7} | 6
(France) L Van Assche | 4 | 6 | 6^{7}
Q | (France) T Droguet | 6 | 2 | 7^{9}

Second round
15 | (United States) F Tiafoe | 5 | 6 | 6
(Croatia) M Čilić | 7 | 2 | 2
(Serbia) M Kecmanović | 7^{7} | 4 | 4
23 | (France) A Rinderknech | 6^{5} | 6 | 6
28 | (United States) B Nakashima | 6 | 6
(Germany) D Altmaier | 2 | 1
Q | (France) T Droguet | 7^{7} | 6
LL | (Portugal) J Faria | 6^{2} | 2

Third round
15 | (United States) F Tiafoe | 2 | 0^{r}
23 | (France) A Rinderknech | 6 | 2
28 | (United States) B Nakashima | 4 | 6 | 7
Q | (France) T Droguet | 6 | 2 | 5

Fourth round
23 | (France) A Rinderknech | 6^{4} | 7 | 5
28 | (United States) B Nakashima | 7^{7} | 5 | 7

== Seeded players ==
The following are the seeded players. Seedings are based on ATP rankings as of 27 July 2026. Rankings and points before are as of 3 August 2026.

Because the tournament takes place one week later this year, points from the 2025 tournament held in Toronto were already dropped from rankings on 3 August 2026. Accordingly, the points defending column reflects the player's 18th best result as of 3 August 2026 (in parentheses) instead. This method of calculating ranking points for the tournament is different from the WTA's method.

| ^{‡} | Champion |
| ^{†} | Runner-up |

| Seed | Rank | Player | Points before | Points defending (18th best) | Points earned | Points after | Status |
|---|---|---|---|---|---|---|---|
| 1 | 3 | (Germany) Alexander Zverev | 8,120 | (40) | 10 | 8,090 | Second round lost to (Netherlands) Tallon Griekspoor |
| 2 | 4 | ~~(Canada) Félix Auger-Aliassime~~ | 4,740 | (50) | 0 | 4,690 | Withdrew due to back injury |
| 3 | 7 | (Australia) Alex de Minaur | 3,560 | (50) | 50 | 3,560 | Third round lost to (United Kingdom) Cameron Norrie |
| 4 | 6 | Daniil Medvedev | 3,620 | (50) | 10 | 3,580 | Second round lost to (Netherlands) Botic van de Zandschulp |
| 5 | 10 | (United States) Ben Shelton^{‡} | 2,680 | (10) | 1,000 | 3,670 | Champion, defeated (United States) Brandon Nakashima [28] |
| 6 | 9 | (Italy) Flavio Cobolli | 3,330 | (10) | 10 | 3,330 | Second round lost to (Germany) Yannick Hanfmann |
| 7 | 8 | (United States) Taylor Fritz | 3,400 | (35) | 10 | 3,375 | Second round lost to (Argentina) Thiago Agustín Tirante |
| 8 | 12 | (Czech Republic) Jiří Lehečka | 2,380 | (10) | 100 | 2,470 | Fourth round lost to (Spain) Rafael Jódar [20] |
| 9 | 14 | (Norway) Casper Ruud | 2,345 | (10) | 50 | 2,385 | Third round lost to (Brazil) João Fonseca [22] |
| 10 | 16 | Andrey Rublev | 2,230 | (10) | 10 | 2,230 | Second round lost to (China) Shang Juncheng [PR] |
| 11 | 13 | (Italy) Lorenzo Musetti | 2,375 | (10) | 50 | 2,415 | Third round lost to (Spain) Rafael Jódar [20] |
| 12 | 19 | (United States) Learner Tien | 2,155 | (10) | 400 | 2,545 | Semifinals lost to (United States) Ben Shelton [5] |
| 13 | 17 | (Czech Republic) Jakub Menšík | 2,205 | (10) | 200 | 2,395 | Quarterfinals lost to (United States) Ben Shelton [5] |
| 14 | 18 | (Monaco) Valentin Vacherot | 2,176 | (0) | 10 | 2,186 | Second round lost to (Argentina) Mariano Navone |
| 15 | 20 | (United States) Frances Tiafoe | 2,105 | (25) | 50 | 2,130 | Third round retired against (France) Arthur Rinderknech [23] |
| 16 | 23 | (Argentina) Francisco Cerúndolo | 2,010 | (50) | 10 | 1,970 | Second round lost to (United States) Alex Michelsen |
| 17 | 21 | (United States) Tommy Paul | 2,075 | (50) | 50 | 2,075 | Third round vs. (United States) Learner Tien [12] |
| 18 | 24 | (France) Arthur Fils | 1,940 | (0) | 200 | 2,140 | Quarterfinals lost to (Spain) Rafael Jódar [20] |
| 19 | 22 | (Italy) Luciano Darderi | 2,025 | (50) | 200 | 2,175 | Quarterfinals lost to (United States) Brandon Nakashima [28] |
| 20 | 15 | (Spain) Rafael Jódar | 2,243 | (22) | 400 | 2,621 | Semifinals lost to (United States) Brandon Nakashima [28] |
| 21 | 39 | Karen Khachanov | 1,130 | (0) | 10 | 1,140 | Second round lost to (France) Térence Atmane |
| 22 | 27 | (Brazil) João Fonseca | 1,700 | (0) | 100 | 1,800 | Fourth round lost to (United States) Ben Shelton [5] |
| 23 | 28 | (France) Arthur Rinderknech | 1,623 | (0) | 100 | 1,723 | Fourth round lost to (United States) Brandon Nakashima [28] |
| 24 | 29 | (France) Ugo Humbert | 1,625 | (50) | 10 | 1,585 | Second round lost to (Spain) Daniel Mérida |
| 25 | 26 | (Chile) Alejandro Tabilo | 1,728 | (50) | 10 | 1,688 | Second round lost to (Poland) Hubert Hurkacz [PR] |
| 26 | 30 | (Argentina) Tomás Martín Etcheverry | 1,510 | (50) | 10 | 1,470 | Second round lost to (Portugal) Nuno Borges |
| 27 | 32 | (Belgium) Alexander Blockx | 1,353 | (7) | 50 | 1,396 | Third round lost to (Czech Republic) Jiří Lehečka [8] |
| 28 | 31 | (United States) Brandon Nakashima^{†} | 1,510 | (25) | 650 | 2,135 | Runner-up, lost to (United States) Ben Shelton [5] |
| 29 | 33 | (Peru) Ignacio Buse | 1,350 | (25) | 10 | 1,335 | Second round lost to (United Kingdom) Cameron Norrie |
| 30 | 35 | (Italy) Matteo Arnaldi | 1,299 | (0) | 50 | 1,349 | Third round lost to (Netherlands) Tallon Griekspoor |
| 31 | 34 | (Belgium) Zizou Bergs | 1,340 | (25) | 50 | 1,365 | Third round lost to (United States) Ben Shelton [5] |
| 32 | 38 | (Belgium) Raphaël Collignon | 1,234 | (22) | 10 | 1,222 | Second round lost to (Australia) Alexei Popyrin [Q] |

=== Withdrawn seeded players ===
The following players would have been seeded, but withdrew before the tournament began.

| Rank | Player | Points before | Points dropping (18th best) | Points after | Withdrawal reason |
|---|---|---|---|---|---|
| 1 | (Italy) Jannik Sinner | 13,450 | (0) | 13,450 | Schedule change |
| 2 | (Spain) Carlos Alcaraz | 8,160 | (0) | 8,160 | Right wrist injury |
| 5 | (Serbia) Novak Djokovic | 3,760 | (0) | 3,760 | Schedule change |
| 11 | (Kazakhstan) Alexander Bublik | 2,535 | (10) | 2,525 | Schedule change |
| 25 | (Spain) Alejandro Davidovich Fokina | 1,830 | (50) | 1,780 | Fatigue |

== Other entry information ==
=== Wildcards ===
- (Canada) Gabriel Diallo
- (United Kingdom) Jack Draper
- (Canada) Liam Draxl
- (Canada) Alexis Galarneau
- (France) Gaël Monfils

=== Protected ranking ===
- (Poland) Hubert Hurkacz
- (China) Shang Juncheng

=== Withdrawals ===
- § (Spain) Carlos Alcaraz → replaced by (Germany) Jan-Lennard Struff
- † (Canada) Félix Auger-Aliassime → replaced by (Portugal) Jaime Faria
- ‡ (Kazakhstan) Alexander Bublik → replaced by (Australia) Rinky Hijikata
- ‡ (Spain) Alejandro Davidovich Fokina → replaced by (United States) Jenson Brooksby
- ‡ (Serbia) Novak Djokovic → replaced by (Hungary) Márton Fucsovics
- ‡ (United States) Sebastian Korda → replaced by (France) Luca Van Assche
- ‡ (Czech Republic) Tomáš Macháč → replaced by (Australia) James Duckworth
- ‡ (United States) Ethan Quinn → replaced by (Spain) Daniel Mérida
- ‡ (Italy) Jannik Sinner → replaced by (France) Valentin Royer

§ – not included on entry list
‡ – withdrew from entry list
† – withdrew from main draw

== Qualifying ==
=== Seeds ===
1. (Greece) Stefanos Tsitsipas (qualified)
2. (Portugal) Jaime Faria (qualifying competition, lucky loser)
3. (United States) Marcos Giron (qualified)
4. (Kazakhstan) Alexander Shevchenko (qualifying competition)
5. (France) Hugo Gaston (qualifying competition)
6. (Argentina) Marco Trungelliti (qualifying competition)
7. (Japan) Sho Shimabukuro (qualified)
8. (Australia) Adam Walton (qualified)
9. (France) Benjamin Bonzi (qualified)
10. (Australia) Alexei Popyrin (qualified)
11. (United States) Martin Damm (qualified)
12. (Australia) Aleksandar Vukic (qualified)
13. (United Kingdom) Jacob Fearnley (qualified)
14. (Japan) Shintaro Mochizuki (qualified)
15. (Czech Republic) Dalibor Svrčina (qualifying competition)
16. (United States) Michael Zheng (qualified)
17. (France) Titouan Droguet (qualified)
18. (France) Kyrian Jacquet (qualified)
19. (Australia) Dane Sweeny (qualifying competition)
20. (Portugal) Henrique Rocha (qualifying competition)
21. (Austria) Sebastian Ofner (qualifying competition)
22. (Australia) Christopher O'Connell (qualified)
23. (Spain) Pablo Llamas Ruiz (qualifying competition)
24. (Colombia) Nicolás Mejía (qualified)
25. (Chile) Tomás Barrios Vera (qualifying competition)
26. (Bolivia) Hugo Dellien (qualifying competition)
27. (Norway) Nicolai Budkov Kjær (qualifying competition)
28. (Canada) Justin Boulais (qualifying competition)
29. (Australia) Thanasi Kokkinakis (qualifying competition, retired)
30. (Canada) Duncan Chan (qualified)
31. (Japan) Kei Nishikori (qualifying competition)
32. (Canada) Keegan Rice (qualifying competition)

=== Qualifiers ===
1. (Greece) Stefanos Tsitsipas
2. (Australia) Christopher O'Connell
3. (United States) Marcos Giron
4. (France) Kyrian Jacquet
5. (Canada) Duncan Chan
6. (Colombia) Nicolás Mejía
7. (Japan) Sho Shimabukuro
8. (Australia) Adam Walton
9. (France) Benjamin Bonzi
10. (Australia) Alexei Popyrin
11. (United States) Martin Damm
12. (Australia) Aleksandar Vukic
13. (United Kingdom) Jacob Fearnley
14. (Japan) Shintaro Mochizuki
15. (France) Titouan Droguet
16. (United States) Michael Zheng

=== Lucky loser ===
1. (Portugal) Jaime Faria

=== Qualifying draw ===
==== First qualifier ====
| Qualifying competition |
| 1/Alt | (Greece) Stefanos Tsitsipas | 6 | 6 |
| 32/WC | (Canada) Keegan Rice | 3 | 4 |

==== Second qualifier ====
| Qualifying competition |
| 2 | (Portugal) Jaime Faria | 7^{10} | 2 | 4 |
| 22 | (Australia) Christopher O'Connell | 6^{8} | 6 | 6 |

==== Third qualifier ====
| Qualifying competition |
| 3 | (United States) Marcos Giron | 2 | 6 | 6 |
| 23 | (Spain) Pablo Llamas Ruiz | 6 | 3 | 1 |

==== Fourth qualifier ====
| Qualifying competition |
| 4 | (Kazakhstan) Alexander Shevchenko | 6 | 4 | 3 |
| 18 | (France) Kyrian Jacquet | 4 | 6 | 6 |

==== Fifth qualifier ====
| Qualifying competition |
| 5 | (France) Hugo Gaston | 6 | 5 | 3 |
| 30/WC | (Canada) Duncan Chan | 2 | 7 | 6 |

==== Sixth qualifier ====
| Qualifying competition |
| 6 | (Argentina) Marco Trungelliti | 6^{5} | 6 | 1 |
| 24 | (Colombia) Nicolás Mejía | 7^{7} | 3 | 6 |

==== Seventh qualifier ====
| Qualifying competition |
| 7 | (Japan) Sho Shimabukuro | 6 | 6 |
| 27 | (Norway) Nicolai Budkov Kjær | 3 | 4 |

==== Eighth qualifier ====
| Qualifying competition |
| 8 | (Australia) Adam Walton | 7 | 7^{7} |
| 28/WC | (Canada) Justin Boulais | 5 | 6^{4} |

==== Ninth qualifier ====
| Qualifying competition |
| 9 | (France) Benjamin Bonzi | 7 | 6 |
| 26/Alt | (Bolivia) Hugo Dellien | 5 | 2 |

==== Tenth qualifier ====
| Qualifying competition |
| 10 | (Australia) Alexei Popyrin | 6 | 2 |
| 29/PR | (Australia) Thanasi Kokkinakis | 4 | 3^{r} |

==== Eleventh qualifier ====
| Qualifying competition |
| 11 | (United States) Martin Damm | 6 | 7^{7} |
| 20 | (Portugal) Henrique Rocha | 3 | 6^{3} |

==== Twelfth qualifier ====
| Qualifying competition |
| 12 | (Australia) Aleksandar Vukic | 7^{7} | 6 |
| 25 | (Chile) Tomás Barrios Vera | 6^{4} | 2 |

==== Thirteenth qualifier ====
| Qualifying competition |
| 13 | (United Kingdom) Jacob Fearnley | 7^{7} | 6 |
| 21 | (Austria) Sebastian Ofner | 6^{3} | 2 |

==== Fourteenth qualifier ====
| Qualifying competition |
| 14 | (Japan) Shintaro Mochizuki | 1 | 7^{7} | 6 |
| 19 | (Australia) Dane Sweeny | 6 | 6^{5} | 3 |

==== Fifteenth qualifier ====
| Qualifying competition |
| 15 | (Czech Republic) Dalibor Svrčina | 6 | 3 | 4 |
| 17 | (France) Titouan Droguet | 4 | 6 | 6 |

==== Sixteenth qualifier ====
| Qualifying competition |
| 16 | (United States) Michael Zheng | 6 | 6 |
| 31/WC | (Japan) Kei Nishikori | 3 | 1 |
