= 2026 National Bank Open – Men's doubles =

Men's doubles
- 2026 National Bank Open

Final
- Champions: (Brazil) Orlando Luz (Brazil) Rafael Matos
- Runners-up: (El Salvador) Marcelo Arévalo (Croatia) Mate Pavić
- Score: 5−7, 6−4, [10−6]
- Date: 13 August 2026

Details
- Draw: 32
- Seeds: 8

Events
Singles	men	women
Doubles	men	women
- National Bank Open

Orlando Luz and Rafael Matos defeated Marcelo Arévalo and Mate Pavić in the final, 5−7, 6−4, [10−6] to win the men's doubles tennis title at the 2026 Canadian Open. It was the first Masters 1000 title for both players.

Julian Cash and Lloyd Glasspool were the defending champions, but lost in the first round to Francisco Cerúndolo and Tomás Martín Etcheverry.

Nikola Mektić was vying to complete the career Golden Masters in doubles, but he and his partner Austin Krajicek lost in the first round to Guido Andreozzi and Manuel Guinard.

== Seeds ==
1. (Finland) Harri Heliövaara / (United Kingdom) Henry Patten (quarterfinals)
2. (Spain) Marcel Granollers / (Argentina) Horacio Zeballos (first round)
3. (El Salvador) Marcelo Arévalo / (Croatia) Mate Pavić (final)
4. (Italy) Simone Bolelli / (Italy) Andrea Vavassori (first round)
5. (United States) Christian Harrison / (United Kingdom) Neal Skupski (first round)
6. (United Kingdom) Julian Cash / (United Kingdom) Lloyd Glasspool (first round)
7. (Argentina) Guido Andreozzi / (France) Manuel Guinard (quarterfinals)
8. (France) Pierre-Hugues Herbert / (Germany) Kevin Krawietz (second round)

== Draw ==
Key

- Q = Qualifier
- WC = Wild card
- LL = Lucky loser
- Alt = Alternate
- ITF = ITF entry
- PR = Protected ranking
- SR = Special ranking
- SE = Special exempt
- JE = Junior exempt
- JR = Junior Accelerator Programme entrant
- CO = College Accelerator Programme entrant
- NG = Next Gen Accelerator Program entrant
- w/o = Walkover
- r = Retired
- d = Defaulted

=== Finals ===
Semifinals
(Argentina) Francisco Cerúndolo (Argentina) Tomás Martín Etcheverry	4	6^{7}
(Brazil) Orlando Luz (Brazil) Rafael Matos	6	7^{9}
3	(El Salvador) Marcelo Arévalo (Croatia) Mate Pavić	6	6
(France) Théo Arribagé (France) Albano Olivetti	4	4

Final
(Brazil) Orlando Luz (Brazil) Rafael Matos	5	6	[10]
3	(El Salvador) Marcelo Arévalo (Croatia) Mate Pavić	7	4	[6]

=== Top half ===
First round
1	(Finland) H Heliövaara (United Kingdom) H Patten	6	6
(Peru) I Buse (Italy) F Cobolli	3	2
(Austria) L Miedler (Australia) M Polmans	7^{7}	3	[2]
(Sweden) A Göransson (Norway) C Ruud	6^{5}	6	[10]
(Italy) L Darderi (Chile) A Tabilo	6	7
(France) A Rinderknech (Monaco) V Vacherot	4	5
(Argentina) F Cerúndolo (Argentina) TM Etcheverry	6	3	[10]
6	(United Kingdom) J Cash (United Kingdom) L Glasspool	4	6	[7]
4	(Italy) S Bolelli (Italy) A Vavassori	4	4
(Brazil) O Luz (Brazil) R Matos	6	6
(Portugal) F Cabral (United States) JJ Tracy	6	6
(United States) R Ram (United Kingdom) J Salisbury	4	3
K Khachanov; A Rublev	1	6	[6]
(Italy) M Arnaldi (Italy) L Musetti	6	3	[10]
(United States) A Krajicek (Croatia) N Mektić	4	2
7	(Argentina) G Andreozzi (France) M Guinard	6	6

Second round
1	(Finland) H Heliövaara (United Kingdom) H Patten	6	7^{8}
(Sweden) A Göransson (Norway) C Ruud	4	6^{6}
(Italy) L Darderi (Chile) A Tabilo
(Argentina) F Cerúndolo (Argentina) TM Etcheverry	w/o
(Brazil) O Luz (Brazil) R Matos	6^{8}	6	[13]
(Portugal) F Cabral (United States) JJ Tracy	7^{10}	3	[11]
(Italy) M Arnaldi (Italy) L Musetti	3	4
7	(Argentina) G Andreozzi (France) M Guinard	6	6

Quarterfinals
1	(Finland) H Heliövaara (United Kingdom) H Patten	3	4
(Argentina) F Cerúndolo (Argentina) TM Etcheverry	6	6
(Brazil) O Luz (Brazil) R Matos	6	4	[10]
7	(Argentina) G Andreozzi (France) M Guinard	4	6	[7]

Semifinals
(Argentina) F Cerúndolo (Argentina) TM Etcheverry	4	6^{7}
(Brazil) O Luz (Brazil) R Matos	6	7^{9}

=== Bottom half ===
First round
8	(France) P-H Herbert (Germany) K Krawietz	6	6
Alt	(Belgium) Z Bergs (Belgium) A Blockx	3	1
(Brazil) M Melo (Germany) A Zverev	3	6^{5}
WC	(Canada) D Chan (Canada) A Galarneau	6	7^{7}
(Czech Republic) A Pavlásek (Czech Republic) P Rikl	6	6
Alt	(Germany) Y Hanfmann (Germany) J-L Struff	1	4
Alt	(United States) R Galloway (United States) E King	3	4
3	(El Salvador) M Arévalo (Croatia) M Pavić	6	6
5	(United States) C Harrison (United Kingdom) N Skupski	7^{11}	4	[8]
PR	(India) Y Bhambri (New Zealand) M Venus	6^{9}	6	[10]
(France) T Arribagé (France) A Olivetti	6	6^{5}	[10]
(Germany) J Schnaitter (Germany) M Wallner	3	7^{7}	[7]
WC	(Canada) L Draxl (Canada) C Harper	6	4	[6]
(Hungary) F Marozsán; D Medvedev	4	6	[10]
(Monaco) H Nys (France) É Roger-Vasselin	6	3	[10]
2	(Spain) M Granollers (Argentina) H Zeballos	4	6	[7]

Second round
8	(France) P-H Herbert (Germany) K Krawietz	6^{5}	6^{3}
WC	(Canada) D Chan (Canada) A Galarneau	7^{7}	7^{7}
(Czech Republic) A Pavlásek (Czech Republic) P Rikl	6^{6}	2
3	(El Salvador) M Arévalo (Croatia) M Pavić	7^{8}	6
PR	(India) Y Bhambri (New Zealand) M Venus	6^{5}	7	[9]
(France) T Arribagé (France) A Olivetti	7^{7}	5	[11]
(Hungary) F Marozsán; D Medvedev	7^{7}	6
(Monaco) H Nys (France) É Roger-Vasselin	6^{5}	4

Quarterfinals
WC	(Canada) D Chan (Canada) A Galarneau	2	4
3	(El Salvador) M Arévalo (Croatia) M Pavić	6	6
(France) T Arribagé (France) A Olivetti	7^{7}	6^{4}	[10]
(Hungary) F Marozsán; D Medvedev	6^{4}	7^{7}	[8]

Semifinals
3	(El Salvador) M Arévalo (Croatia) M Pavić	6	6
(France) T Arribagé (France) A Olivetti	4	4

== Seeded teams ==
The following are the seeded teams. Seedings are based on ATP rankings as of 27 July 2026.

Country	Player	Country	Player	Rank	Seed
FIN	Harri Heliövaara	GBR	Henry Patten	2	1
ESP	Marcel Granollers	ARG	Horacio Zeballos	7	2
ESA	Marcelo Arévalo	CRO	Mate Pavić	15	3
ITA	Simone Bolelli	ITA	Andrea Vavassori	19	4
USA	Christian Harrison	GBR	Neal Skupski	19	5
GBR	Julian Cash	GBR	Lloyd Glasspool	22	6
ARG	Guido Andreozzi	FRA	Manuel Guinard	31	7
FRA	Pierre-Hugues Herbert	GER	Kevin Krawietz	37	8

== Other entry information ==
=== Wildcards ===
- ~~(Canada) Félix Auger-Aliassime / (Canada) Gabriel Diallo~~
- (Canada) Duncan Chan / (Canada) Alexis Galarneau
- (Canada) Liam Draxl / (Canada) Cleeve Harper

=== Protected ranking ===
- (India) Yuki Bhambri / (New Zealand) Michael Venus

=== Alternates ===
- (Belgium) Zizou Bergs / (Belgium) Alexander Blockx
- (Germany) Yannick Hanfmann / (Germany) Jan-Lennard Struff
- (United States) Evan King / (United States) Robert Galloway

=== Withdrawals ===
- (Canada) Félix Auger-Aliassime / (Canada) Gabriel Diallo → replaced by (Belgium) Zizou Bergs / (Belgium) Alexander Blockx
- (France) Sadio Doumbia / (France) Fabien Reboul → replaced by (Germany) Yannick Hanfmann / (Germany) Jan-Lennard Struff
- (United States) Alex Michelsen / (United States) Learner Tien → replaced by (United States) Evan King / (United States) Robert Galloway
