= 2026 National Bank Open – Women's singles =

Tennis tournament in Toronto, Canada

Women's singles
- 2026 National Bank Open

Final
- Champion: (Poland) Iga Świątek
- Runner-up: (Kazakhstan) Elena Rybakina
- Score: 6–2, 6–3
- Date: 13 August 2026

Details
- Draw: 96 (16 Q / 8 WC )
- Seeds: 32

Events
Singles	men	women
Doubles	men	women
- Canadian Open

Iga Świątek defeated Elena Rybakina in the final, 6–2, 6–3 to win the women's singles tennis title at the 2026 Canadian Open. It was her twelfth WTA 1000 title and her 26th WTA Tour title overall.

Victoria Mboko was the reigning champion, but did not participate due to a knee injury.

Aryna Sabalenka retained the WTA No. 1 singles ranking by reaching the fourth round. Rybakina was also in contention at the beginning of the tournament.

== Seeds ==
All seeds received a bye into the second round.

1. Aryna Sabalenka (fourth round)
2. (Kazakhstan) Elena Rybakina (final)
3. (United States) Jessica Pegula (fourth round)
4. (United States) Coco Gauff (semifinals)
5. Mirra Andreeva (third round)
6. (Czech Republic) Linda Nosková (second round)
7. (Poland) Iga Świątek (champion)
8. (United States) Amanda Anisimova (fourth round)
9. (Ukraine) Elina Svitolina (semifinals)
10. (Ukraine) Marta Kostyuk (fourth round)
11. (Japan) Naomi Osaka (quarterfinals)
12. (Switzerland) Belinda Bencic (quarterfinals, withdrew)
13. (United States) Iva Jovic (third round)
14. (Romania) Sorana Cîrstea (second round)
15. Diana Shnaider (quarterfinals)
16. Ekaterina Alexandrova (quarterfinals)
17. Anna Kalinskaya (third round)
18. (Poland) Maja Chwalińska (second round)
19. (United States) Madison Keys (third round)
20. (Belgium) Elise Mertens (third round)
21. (Czech Republic) Marie Bouzková (second round)
22. (Czech Republic) Barbora Krejčiková (second round)
23. (United States) Emma Navarro (second round)
24. (Austria) Anastasia Potapova (third round)
25. (Philippines) Alexandra Eala (fourth round)
26. (Latvia) Jeļena Ostapenko (second round, retired)
27. (Denmark) Clara Tauson (second round)
28. (United States) Ann Li (third round)
29. (Greece) Maria Sakkari (third round)
30. (Canada) Leylah Fernandez (fourth round)
31. (Croatia) Donna Vekić (second round)
32. (Czech Republic) Kateřina Siniaková (second round, retired)

Click on the seed number of a player to go to their draw section.

== Draw ==
Key

- Q = Qualifier
- WC = Wild card
- LL = Lucky loser
- Alt = Alternate
- ITF = ITF entry
- PR = Protected ranking
- SR = Special ranking
- SE = Special exempt
- JE = Junior exempt
- JR = Junior Accelerator Programme entrant
- CO = College Accelerator Programme entrant
- NG = Next Gen Accelerator Program entrant
- w/o = Walkover
- r = Retired
- d = Defaulted

=== Finals ===
Quarterfinals
16	Ekaterina Alexandrova	6	0	3
9	(Ukraine) Elina Svitolina	3	6	6
15	Diana Shnaider	2	1
7	(Poland) Iga Świątek	6	6
12	(Switzerland) Belinda Bencic
4	(United States) Coco Gauff	w/o
11	(Japan) Naomi Osaka	6	6^{5}	4
2	(Kazakhstan) Elena Rybakina	4	7^{7}	6

Semifinals
9	(Ukraine) Elina Svitolina	3	6	3
7	(Poland) Iga Świątek	6	1	6
4	(United States) Coco Gauff	7	2	2
2	(Kazakhstan) Elena Rybakina	5	6	6

Final
7	(Poland) Iga Świątek	6	6
2	(Kazakhstan) Elena Rybakina	2	3

=== Top half ===
==== Section 1 ====
First round
Q	(Japan) M Uchijima	6	6
(Spain) C Bucșa	3	4
(Kazakhstan) Y Putintseva	4	1
(China) S Zhang	6	6
(Australia) T Gibson	6	3
(Italy) E Cocciaretto	2	2^{r}
Q	(Italy) L Stefanini	6^{4}	3
(Colombia) C Osorio	7^{7}	6

Second round
1	A Sabalenka	6	6
Q	(Japan) M Uchijima	3	3
(China) S Zhang	6	4
26	(Latvia) J Ostapenko	0	0^{r}
18	(Poland) M Chwalińska	5	1
(Australia) T Gibson	7	6
(Colombia) C Osorio	3	6^{4}
16	E Alexandrova	6	7^{7}

Third round
1	A Sabalenka	6	6
(China) S Zhang	3	4
(Australia) T Gibson	7	1	3
16	E Alexandrova	5	6	6

Fourth round
1	A Sabalenka	6^{3}	6	4
16	E Alexandrova	7^{7}	4	6

==== Section 2 ====
First round
(Spain) J Bouzas Maneiro	6	6
WC	(Canada) A Arseneault	2	4
(Romania) E-G Ruse	6	7
(United States) P Stearns	0	5
(Czech Republic) N Bartůňková	7	6
WC	(Canada) B Andreescu	5	4
Q	(Australia) E Jones	6^{2}	2
Q	(Thailand) L Tararudee	7^{7}	6

Second round
9	(Ukraine) E Svitolina	6^{5}	7^{7}	6
(Spain) J Bouzas Maneiro	7^{7}	6^{4}	4
(Romania) E-G Ruse	4	2
24	(Austria) A Potapova	6	6
27	(Denmark) C Tauson	3	4
(Czech Republic) N Bartůňková	6	6
Q	(Thailand) L Tararudee
8	(United States) A Anisimova	w/o

Third round
9	(Ukraine) E Svitolina	6	6
24	(Austria) A Potapova	1	1
(Czech Republic) N Bartůňková	6	0	4
8	(United States) A Anisimova	3	6	6

Fourth round
9	(Ukraine) E Svitolina	6	6
8	(United States) A Anisimova	2	4

==== Section 3 ====
First round
(Poland) M Fręch	7	6
Q	(France) L Jeanjean	5	3
(Uzbekistan) K Rakhimova	6	6
WC	(United States) V Williams	4	1
(United States) M Kessler	6	6
WC	(Canada) C Brace	3	3
Q	(Slovakia) R Šramková	6	6
Q	A Blinkova	3	3

Second round
3	(United States) J Pegula	3	6	6
(Poland) M Fręch	6	3	2
(Uzbekistan) K Rakhimova	6^{1}	6	5
32	(Czech Republic) K Siniaková	7^{7}	0	2^{r}
17	A Kalinskaya	6	6^{3}	6
(United States) M Kessler	2	7^{7}	4
Q	(Slovakia) R Šramková	2	6	1
15	D Shnaider	6	4	6

Third round
3	(United States) J Pegula	6	6
(Uzbekistan) K Rakhimova	4	0
17	A Kalinskaya	3	3
15	D Shnaider	6	6

Fourth round
3	(United States) J Pegula	3	3
15	D Shnaider	6	6

==== Section 4 ====
First round
Q	(Japan) A Ito	3	4
WC	(Canada) K Sebov	6	6
Q	(France) L Boisson	6	1	3
(Croatia) A Ružić	4	6	6
(Australia) K Birrell	6^{7}	4
(Switzerland) V Golubic	7^{9}	6
(China) Xiy Wang	3	6	5
(Czech Republic) S Bejlek	6	4	7

Second round
10	(Ukraine) M Kostyuk	7^{7}	6
WC	(Canada) K Sebov	6^{4}	0
(Croatia) A Ružić	1	2
19	(United States) M Keys	6	6
31	(Croatia) D Vekić	7	2	3
(Switzerland) V Golubic	5	6	6
(Czech Republic) S Bejlek	0	3
7	(Poland) I Świątek	6	6

Third round
10	(Ukraine) M Kostyuk	6	6
19	(United States) M Keys	3	1
(Switzerland) V Golubic	2	1
7	(Poland) I Świątek	6	6

Fourth round
10	(Ukraine) M Kostyuk	6	1	2
7	(Poland) I Świątek	3	6	6

=== Bottom half ===
==== Section 5 ====
First round
Q	(Germany) T Maria	6	6^{4}	1
(United States) C McNally	4	7^{7}	6
Q	(Andorra) V Jiménez Kasintseva	4	4
(United States) A Parks	6	6
(Czech Republic) T Valentová	4	5
(United States) T Townsend	6	7
(Argentina) S Sierra	3	4
Q	(United States) S Stephens	6	6

Second round
6	(Czech Republic) L Nosková	6^{5}	1
(United States) C McNally	7^{7}	6
(United States) A Parks	1	6	2
25	(Philippines) A Eala	6	4	6
21	(Czech Republic) M Bouzková	6^{4}	5
(United States) T Townsend	7^{7}	7
Q	(United States) S Stephens	3	1
12	(Switzerland) B Bencic	6	6

Third round
(United States) C McNally	3	7	4
25	(Philippines) A Eala	6	5	6
(United States) T Townsend	7^{7}	6^{4}	4
12	(Switzerland) B Bencic	6^{5}	7^{7}	6

Fourth round
25	(Philippines) A Eala	4	0
12	(Switzerland) B Bencic	6	6

==== Section 6 ====
First round
WC	(Canada) C Zhao	6	1	4
(Poland) M Linette	4	6	6
Q	A Korneeva	6	3
Q	(Uzbekistan) P Kudermetova	0	0^{r}
WC	(Canada) R Marino	5	4
(Turkey) Z Sönmez	7	6
(France) D Parry	6	3	5
Q	(United States) K Day	3	6	7

Second round
13	(United States) I Jovic	6	7
(Poland) M Linette	3	5
Q	A Korneeva	6	6
23	(United States) E Navarro	2	2
29	(Greece) M Sakkari	6	6
(Turkey) Z Sönmez	3	2
Q	(United States) K Day	2	5
4	(United States) C Gauff	6	7

Third round
13	(United States) I Jovic	3	4
Q	A Korneeva	6	6
29	(Greece) M Sakkari	1	4
4	(United States) C Gauff	6	6

Fourth round
Q	A Korneeva	3	1
4	(United States) C Gauff	6	6

==== Section 7 ====
First round
(Ukraine) O Oliynykova	4	4
(Czech Republic) Ka Plíšková	6	6
(Mexico) R Zarazúa	6	0	6
(Germany) T Korpatsch	4	6	1
(Ukraine) A Kalinina	4	5
(Hungary) A Bondár	6	7
(Hungary) P Udvardy	2	7^{7}	2
(Germany) E Lys	6	6^{3}	0^{r}

Second round
5	M Andreeva	6	6
(Czech Republic) Ka Plíšková	0	2
(Mexico) R Zarazúa	2	2
30	(Canada) L Fernandez	6	6
20	(Belgium) E Mertens	3	6	6
(Hungary) A Bondár	6	4	4
(Hungary) P Udvardy	2	4
11	(Japan) N Osaka	6	6

Third round
5	M Andreeva	1	4
30	(Canada) L Fernandez	6	6
20	(Belgium) E Mertens	1	2
11	(Japan) N Osaka	6	6

Fourth round
30	(Canada) L Fernandez	4	4
11	(Japan) N Osaka	6	6

==== Section 8 ====
First round
(Ukraine) Y Starodubtseva	6	1	3
Q	(Australia) M Joint	4	6	6
(Indonesia) J Tjen	6^{9}	5
L Samsonova	7^{11}	7
(United Kingdom) K Boulter	6^{3}	5
WC	(Canada) K Cross	7^{7}	7
(China) Xin Wang	6	6^{5}	5
(Australia) D Kasatkina	1	7^{7}	7

Second round
14	(Romania) S Cîrstea	4	4
Q	(Australia) M Joint	6	6
L Samsonova	6	7
22	(Czech Republic) B Krejčíková	1	5
28	(United States) A Li	7^{7}	6
WC	(Canada) K Cross	6^{2}	3
(Australia) D Kasatkina	3	7	4
2	(Kazakhstan) E Rybakina	6	5	6

Third round
Q	(Australia) M Joint	5	7^{7}	2
L Samsonova	7	6^{3}	6
28	(United States) A Li	2	5
2	(Kazakhstan) E Rybakina	6	7

Fourth round
L Samsonova	4	6	4
2	(Kazakhstan) E Rybakina	6	4	6

== Seeded players ==
The following are the seeded players. Seedings are based on WTA rankings as of 27 July 2026. Rankings and points before are as of 3 August 2026.

Even though the tournament takes place one week later this year, players will still defend their points from the 2025 tournament held in Montreal during this year's tournament, as the 2025 results were postdated and will drop on 10 August 2026. This method of calculating ranking points for the tournament is different from the ATP's method.

^{‡}	Champion
^{†}	Runner-up

Seed	Rank	Player	Points before	Points defending	Points earned	Points after	Status
1	1	Aryna Sabalenka	8,550	0	120	8,670	Fourth round lost to Ekaterina Alexandrova [16]
2	2	(Kazakhstan) Elena Rybakina^{†}	8,056	390	650	8,316	Runner-up, lost to (Poland) Iga Świątek [7]
3	3	(United States) Jessica Pegula	6,625	65	120	6,680	Fourth round lost to Diana Shnaider [15]
4	4	(United States) Coco Gauff	5,649	120	390	5,919	Semifinals lost to (Kazakhstan) Elena Rybakina [2]
5	5	Mirra Andreeva	5,293	35	65	5,323	Third round lost to (Canada) Leylah Fernandez [30]
6	7	(Czech Republic) Linda Nosková	5,016	10	10	5,016	Second round lost to (United States) Caty McNally
7	8	(Poland) Iga Świątek^{‡}	4,539	120	1,000	5,419	Champion, defeated (Kazakhstan) Elena Rybakina [2]
8	10	(United States) Amanda Anisimova	4,353	120	120	4,353	Fourth round lost to (Ukraine) Elina Svitolina [9]
9	9	(Ukraine) Elina Svitolina	4,459	215	390	4,634	Semifinals lost to (Poland) Iga Świątek [7]
10	11	(Ukraine) Marta Kostyuk	3,925	215	120	3,830	Fourth round lost to (Poland) Iga Świątek [7]
11	13	(Japan) Naomi Osaka	3,281	650	215	2,846	Quarterfinals lost to (Kazakhstan) Elena Rybakina [2]
12	14	(Switzerland) Belinda Bencic	2,845	65	215	2,995	Quarterfinals withdrew due to hip injury
13	16	(United States) Iva Jovic	2,636	(10)^{∆}	65	2,691	Third round lost to Alina Korneeva [Q]
14	18	(Romania) Sorana Cîrstea	2,502	(35)^{∆}	(35)^{Ω}	2,502	Second round lost to (Australia) Maya Joint [Q]
15	17	Diana Shnaider	2,593	10	215	2,798	Quarterfinals lost to (Poland) Iga Świątek [7]
16	19	Ekaterina Alexandrova	2,301	10	215	2,506	Quarterfinals lost to (Ukraine) Elina Svitolina [9]
17	21	Anna Kalinskaya	2,083	65	65	2,083	Third round lost to Diana Shnaider [15]
18	22	(Poland) Maja Chwalińska	1,975	(1)^{∆}	10	1,984	Second round lost to (Australia) Talia Gibson
19	23	(United States) Madison Keys	1,964	215	65	1,814	Third round lost to (Ukraine) Marta Kostyuk [10]
20	24	(Belgium) Elise Mertens	1,948	10	65	2,003	Third round lost to (Japan) Naomi Osaka [11]
21	25	(Czech Republic) Marie Bouzková	1,829	65	10	1,774	Second round lost to (United States) Taylor Townsend
22	26	(Czech Republic) Barbora Krejčiková	1,776	10	10	1,776	Second round lost to Liudmila Samsonova
23	28	(United States) Emma Navarro	1,724	65	10	1,669	Second round lost to Alina Korneeva [Q]
24	27	(Austria) Anastasia Potapova	1,726	10	65	1,781	Third round lost to (Ukraine) Elina Svitolina [9]
25	20	(Philippines) Alexandra Eala	2,106	10	120	2,216	Fourth round lost to (Switzerland) Belinda Bencic [12]
26	29	(Latvia) Jeļena Ostapenko	1,592	65	10	1,537	Second round retired against (China) Zhang Shuai
27	30	(Denmark) Clara Tauson	1,564	390	10	1,184	Second round lost to (Czech Republic) Nikola Bartůňková
28	31	(United States) Ann Li	1,541	10	65	1,596	Third round lost to (Kazakhstan) Elena Rybakina [2]
29	33	(Greece) Maria Sakkari	1,355	35	65	1,385	Third round lost to (United States) Coco Gauff [4]
30	34	(Canada) Leylah Fernandez	1,344	10	120	1,454	Fourth round lost to (Japan) Naomi Osaka [11]
31	35	(Croatia) Donna Vekić	1,326	0	10	1,336	Second round lost to (Switzerland) Viktorija Golubic
32	37	(Czech Republic) Kateřina Siniaková	1,285	(125)^{§}	10	1,170	Second round retired against (Uzbekistan) Kamilla Rakhimova

∆ The player is defending points from her 18th best result or her sixth best combined WTA 1000 tournament result.
Ω The player is keeping her sixth best combined WTA 1000 tournament result as it is higher than the Toronto result, which does not need to be counted in her ranking points.
§ The player is defending points from a WTA 125 tournament (Warsaw).

=== Withdrawn seeded players ===
The following players would have been seeded, but withdrew before the tournament began.

Rank	Player	Points before	Points dropping	Points after	Withdrawal reason
6	(Czech Republic) Karolína Muchová	5,168	120	5,048	Minor surgery
12	(Canada) Victoria Mboko	3,520	1,000	2,520	Left knee injury
15	(Italy) Jasmine Paolini	2,783	10	2,773	Foot injury
32	(United States) Hailey Baptiste	1,372	35	1,337	Left knee injury

== Other entry information ==
=== Wildcards ===
- (Canada) Bianca Andreescu
- (Canada) Ariana Arseneault
- (Canada) Cadence Brace
- (Canada) Kayla Cross
- (Canada) Rebecca Marino
- (Canada) Katherine Sebov
- (United States) Venus Williams
- (Canada) Carol Zhao

=== Withdrawals ===
- § (United States) Hailey Baptiste → replaced by (Hungary) Anna Bondár
- ‡ (Croatia) Petra Marčinko → replaced by (United States) Alycia Parks
- § (Canada) Victoria Mboko → replaced by (Czech Republic) Karolína Plíšková
- ‡ (Czech Republic) Karolína Muchová → replaced by (United States) Taylor Townsend
- ‡ (Italy) Jasmine Paolini → replaced by (Germany) Tamara Korpatsch
- ‡ (United Kingdom) Emma Raducanu → replaced by (Germany) Eva Lys
- ‡ (Germany) Laura Siegemund → replaced by (China) Wang Xiyu
- § (Ukraine) Dayana Yastremska → replaced by (Mexico) Renata Zarazúa

§ – not included on entry list
‡ – withdrew from entry list
† – withdrew from main draw

== Qualifying ==
=== Seeds ===
1. (Australia) Maya Joint (qualified)
2. (Thailand) Lanlana Tararudee (qualified)
3. (Germany) Tatjana Maria (qualified)
4. Alina Korneeva (qualified)
5. (United States) Katie Volynets (withdrew)
6. (Colombia) Emiliana Arango (qualifying competition)
7. (Spain) Oksana Selekhmeteva (qualifying competition)
8. Anna Blinkova (qualified)
9. (Japan) Moyuka Uchijima (qualified)
10. (Uzbekistan) Polina Kudermetova (qualified)
11. (Thailand) Mananchaya Sawangkaew (qualifying competition)
12. (Czech Republic) Darja Vidmanova (withdrew, still competing in Memphis)
13. (United States) Sofia Kenin (qualifying competition)
14. (France) Léolia Jeanjean (qualified)
15. (Australia) Taylah Preston (withdrew, still competing in Vancouver)
16. (Andorra) Victoria Jiménez Kasintseva (qualified)

=== Qualifiers ===
1. (Australia) Maya Joint
2. (Thailand) Lanlana Tararudee
3. (Germany) Tatjana Maria
4. Alina Korneeva
5. (United States) Sloane Stephens
6. (France) Loïs Boisson
7. (Japan) Aoi Ito
8. Anna Blinkova
9. (Japan) Moyuka Uchijima
10. (Uzbekistan) Polina Kudermetova
11. (Slovakia) Rebecca Šramková
12. (United States) Kayla Day
13. (Italy) Lucrezia Stefanini
14. (France) Léolia Jeanjean
15. (Australia) Emerson Jones
16. (Andorra) Victoria Jiménez Kasintseva

=== Qualifying draw ===
==== First qualifier ====
Qualifying competition
1	(Australia) Maya Joint	3	7	7^{9}
WC	(Canada) Ana Grubor	6	5	6^{7}

==== Second qualifier ====
Qualifying competition
2	(Thailand) Lanlana Tararudee	6	6
	(China) Zheng Qinwen	3	4

==== Third qualifier ====
Qualifying competition
3	(Germany) Tatjana Maria	6	6
WC	(Canada) Isabella Marton	1	4

==== Fourth qualifier ====
Qualifying competition
4	Alina Korneeva	2	6	6
	(United States) Mary Stoiana	6	4	3

==== Fifth qualifier ====
Qualifying competition
Alt	(United Kingdom) Harriet Dart	6	0	2
PR	(United States) Sloane Stephens	3	6	6

==== Sixth qualifier ====
Qualifying competition
6	(Colombia) Emiliana Arango	1	6^{4}
WC	(France) Loïs Boisson	6	7^{7}

==== Seventh qualifier ====
Qualifying competition
7	(Spain) Oksana Selekhmeteva	0	7^{10}	4
PR	(Japan) Aoi Ito	6	6^{8}	6

==== Eighth qualifier ====
Qualifying competition
8	Anna Blinkova	6	7
Alt/PR	(United Kingdom) Heather Watson	2	5

==== Ninth qualifier ====
Qualifying competition
9	(Japan) Moyuka Uchijima	6	6
	(Japan) Himeno Sakatsume	2	4

==== Tenth qualifier ====
Qualifying competition
10	(Uzbekistan) Polina Kudermetova	6	6
WC	(Canada) Avery Alexander	4	4

==== Eleventh qualifier ====
Qualifying competition
11	(Thailand) Mananchaya Sawangkaew	1	4
	(Slovakia) Rebecca Šramková	6	6

==== Twelfth qualifier ====
Qualifying competition
Alt	(China) Guo Hanyu	5	2
	(United States) Kayla Day	7	6

==== Thirteenth qualifier ====
Qualifying competition
13	(United States) Sofia Kenin	5	6	2
	(Italy) Lucrezia Stefanini	7	1	6

==== Fourteenth qualifier ====
Qualifying competition
14	(France) Léolia Jeanjean	2	6	6
	(China) Zhu Lin	6	2	3

==== Fifteenth qualifier ====
Qualifying competition
Alt	(United States) Varvara Lepchenko	7^{7}	0	4
	(Australia) Emerson Jones	6^{3}	6	6

==== Sixteenth qualifier ====
Qualifying competition
16	(Andorra) Victoria Jiménez Kasintseva	6	2	6
	(Spain) Marina Bassols Ribera	0	6	3
