= 2026 National Bank Open =

- Date: August 2–13, 2026
- Edition: 136th (men) / 124th (women)
- Category: ATP Tour Masters 1000 (men); WTA 1000 (women)
- Draw: 96S / 32D
- Surface: Hard / outdoor
- Location: Montreal, Canada (men); Toronto, Canada (women)

Champions

Men's singles
- (United States) Ben Shelton

Women's singles
- (Poland) Iga Świątek

Men's doubles
- (Brazil) Orlando Luz / (Brazil) Rafael Matos

Women's doubles
- (Czech Republic) Kateřina Siniaková / (China) Zhang Shuai
- Canadian Open (tennis)

The 2026 Canadian Open championships (branded as the National Bank Open presented by Rogers for sponsorship reasons) was a pair of outdoor hardcourt tennis tournaments that took place from August 2 to 13, 2026. The women's tournament took place at the Sobeys Stadium in Toronto and the men's event took place at the IGA Stadium in Montreal. It was the 136th edition of the men's tournament—a mandatory Masters 1000 event on the 2026 ATP Tour, and the 124th edition of the women's tournament—a mandatory WTA 1000 event on the 2026 WTA Tour.

== Champions ==
=== Men's singles ===
- (United States) Ben Shelton def. (United States) Brandon Nakashima, 6–3, 7–6^{(7–4)}

=== Women's singles ===
- (Poland) Iga Świątek def. (Kazakhstan) Elena Rybakina, 6–2, 6–3

=== Men's doubles ===
- (Brazil) Orlando Luz / (Brazil) Rafael Matos def. (El Salvador) Marcelo Arévalo / (Croatia) Mate Pavić, 5−7, 6−4, [10−6]

=== Women's doubles ===
- (Czech Republic) Kateřina Siniaková / (China) Zhang Shuai def. (Italy) Sara Errani / (United States) Nicole Melichar-Martinez, 6–3, 6–4

== Points and prize money ==
Event	W	F	SF	QF	R16	R32	R64	R128	Q	Q1
Men's singles	1000	650	400	200	100	50	30*	10	20	0
Men's doubles	1000	600	360	180	90	0	—N/a	—N/a	—N/a	—N/a
Women's singles	1000	650	390	215	120	65	35*	10	20	2
Women's doubles	1000	650	390	215	120	10	—N/a	—N/a	—N/a	—N/a

* Players with byes receive first-round points.

=== Prize money ===
Event	W	F	SF	QF	Round of 16	Round of 32	Round of 64	Round of 128	Q	Q1
Men's singles	$1,151,420	$612,340	$340,190	$193,645	$105,720	$61,865	$36,110	$24,335	—N/a	$21,590
Women's singles	$1,085,220	$564,920	$297,315	$154,354	$81,800	$47,605	$28,425	$18,420	—N/a	$10,100
Men's doubles*	$468,200	$247,870	$133,110	$66,570	$35,700	$19,510	—N/a	—N/a	—N/a	—N/a
Women's doubles*	$379,080	$200,690	$107,760	$53,900	$28,810	$15,800	—N/a	—N/a	—N/a	—N/a

_{*per team}
